= List of British artists =

This is a partial list of artists active in Britain, arranged chronologically (artists born in the same year should be arranged alphabetically within that year).

== Born before 1700 ==
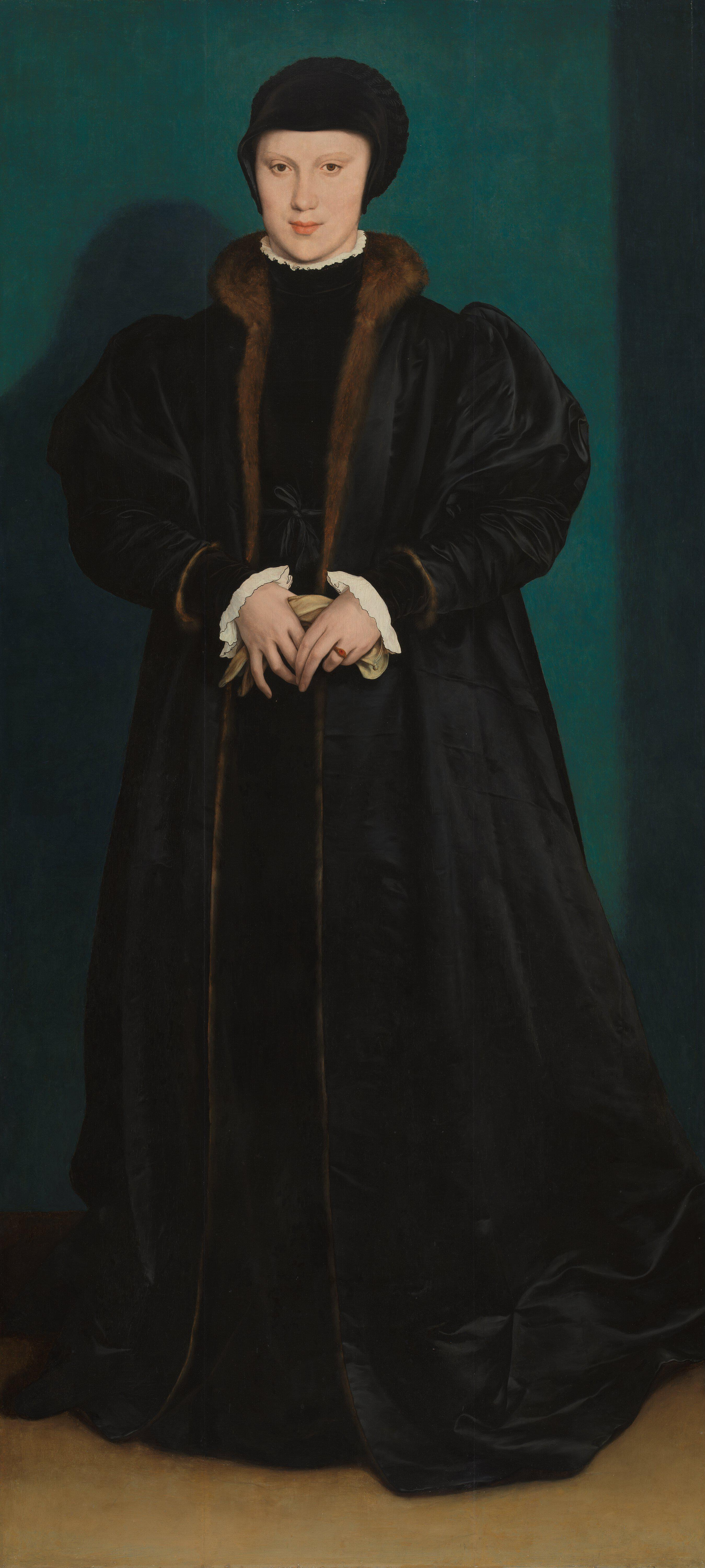
Hans Holbein the Younger, Portrait of Christina of Denmark, c. 1538. Oil and tempera on oak, National Gallery, London

- Hans Holbein the Younger (1497/8–1543) – German artist and printmaker who became court painter in England
- Elizabeth Lucar (1510-1537)- English Calligrapher
- Levina Teerlinc (1510s- 1576) - Flemish-born artist, painter to Henry VIII, Edward VI, Mary I, and Elizabeth I.
- Marcus Gheeraerts the Elder (c.1520–c.1590) – Flemish printmaker and painter for the English court of the mid-16th century
- George Gower (1540–1596) – English portrait painter
- Nicholas Hilliard (1547–1619) – English goldsmith, limner, portrait miniature painter
- Rowland Lockey (c.1565–1616) – English goldsmith, portrait miniaturist, painter
- Isaac Oliver (c.1565–1617) – French-born English portrait miniature painter
- Anthony van Dyck (1599–1641) – Flemish Baroque painter, watercolourist and etcher who became court painter in England
- Wenceslaus Hollar (1607–1677) – Czech etcher
- Samuel Cooper (c.1608–1672) – English miniature painter
- John Michael Wright (1617–1694) – British baroque portrait painter
- Peter Lely (1618–1680) – Dutch painter and portrait artist in England
- Francis Barlow (c.1626–1704) – English painter, etcher, and illustrator
- David Loggan (1635–1692) – English baroque painter, born in Danzig
- Godfrey Kneller (1646/9–1723) – portrait painter in England
- Edward Pierce (1630–1695)
- Francis Place (1647–1728) – English potter and engraver
- James Thornhill (1675–1734) – English painter of historical subjects
- Jonathan Richardson (1665–1745) – English portrait painter
- Peter Monamy (1681–1749) – English marine painter
- John Wootton (1682–1764) – English painter of sporting subjects, battle scenes and landscapes
- Pieter Andreas Rysbrack (1685 or 1690–1748) – Flemish painter working in London
- John Michael Rysbrack (1694–1770) – Flemish sculptor working in London
- John Vanderbank (1694–1739) – English portrait painter and book illustrator
- William Hogarth (1697–1764) – English painter, printmaker, pictorial satirist, social critic and editorial cartoonist

== Born 1700–1799 ==
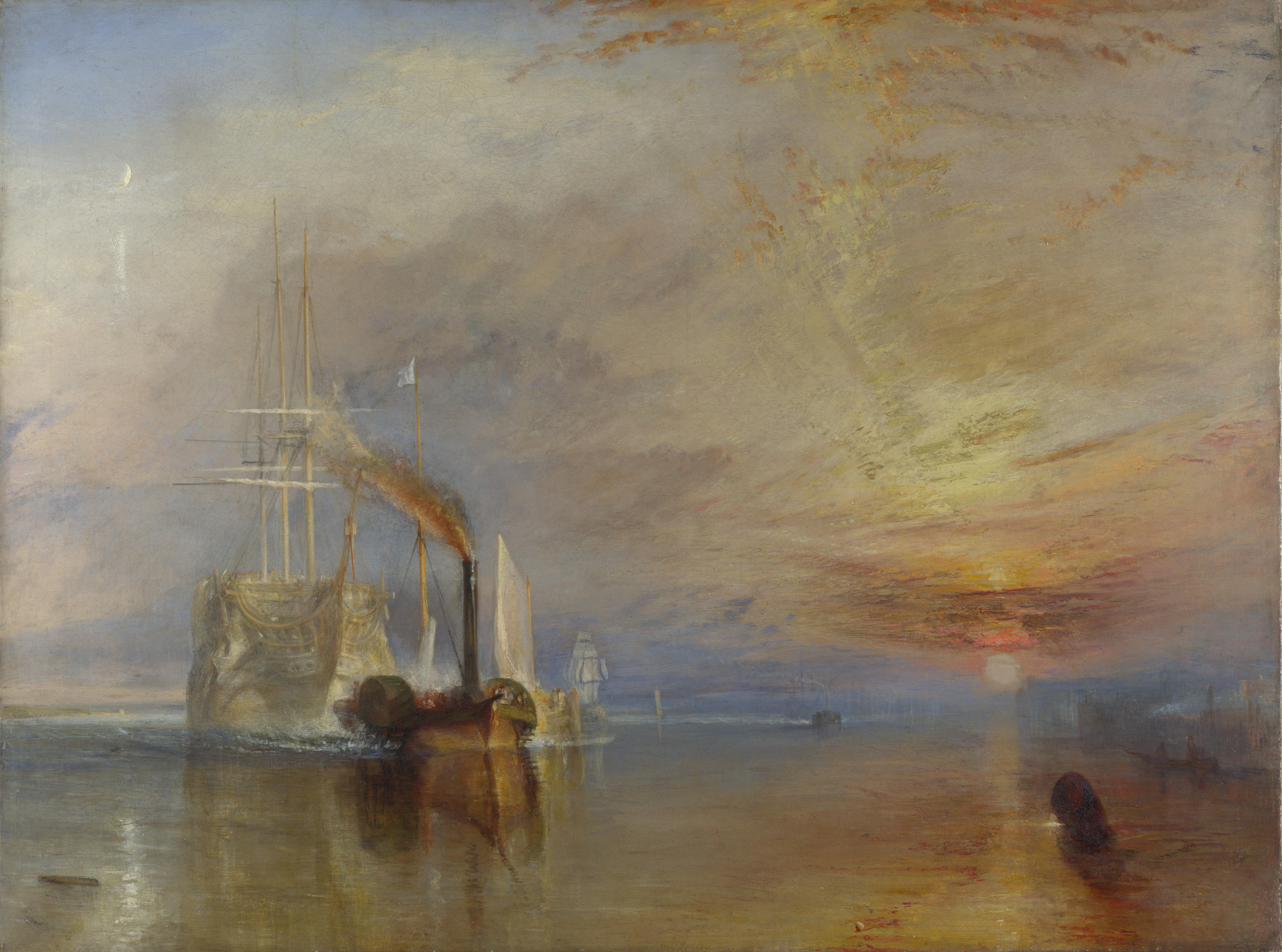
J. M. W. Turner, The Fighting Temeraire, National Gallery

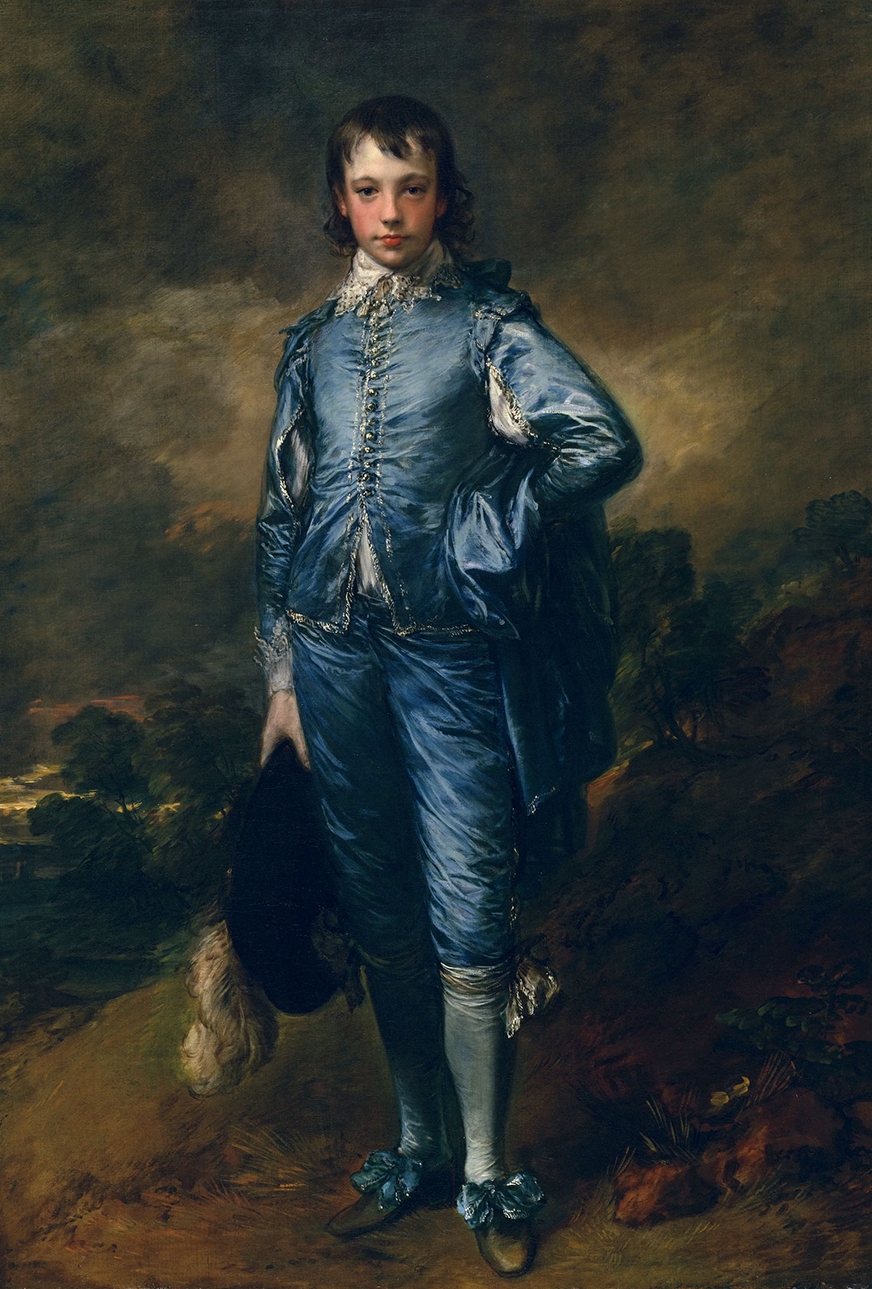
Thomas Gainsborough, The Blue Boy, 1770

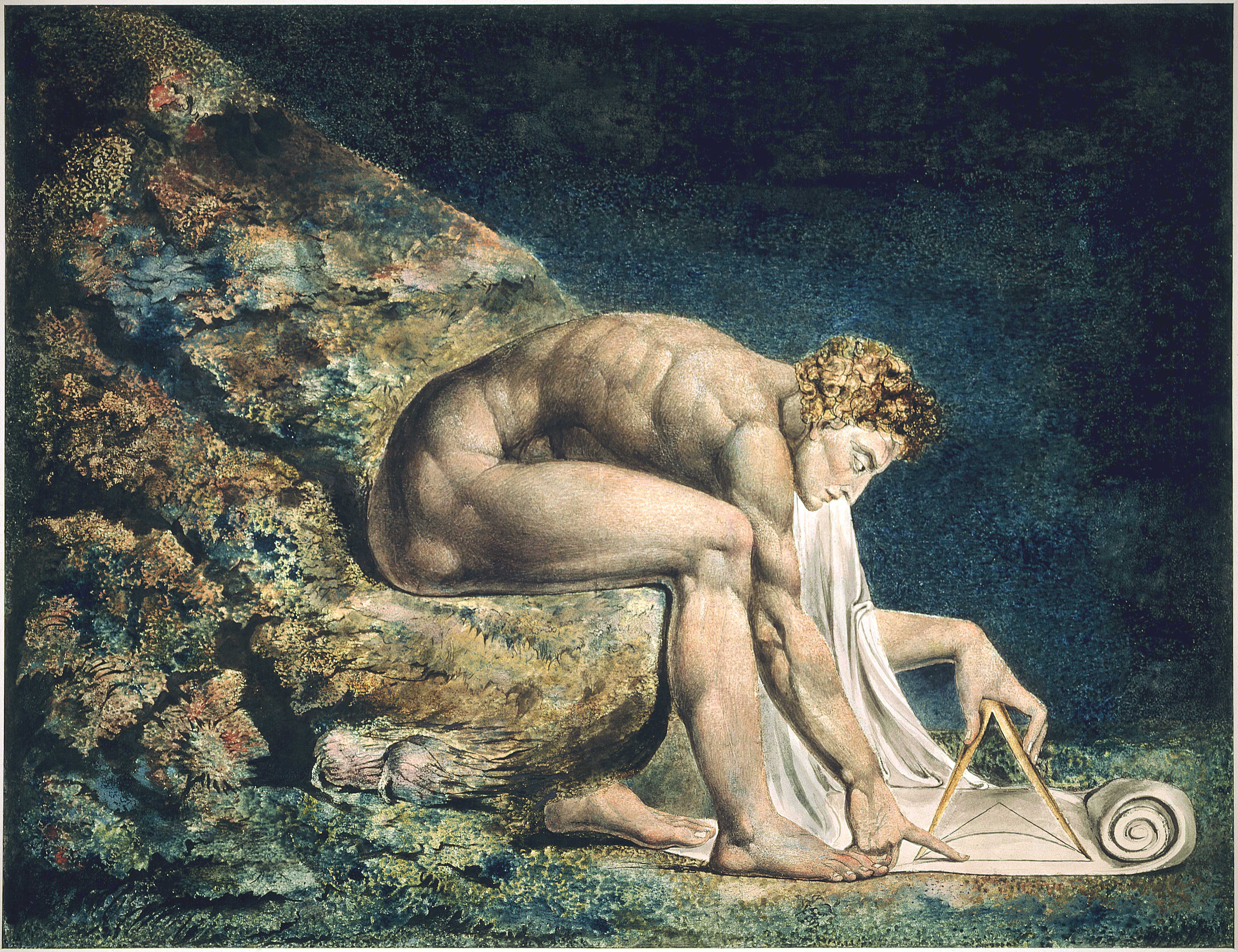
William Blake, Newton (1795)

- Henri Jean-Baptiste Victoire Fradelle (1778–1865) – Franco-English painter specializing in literary, historical and religious subjects
- Louis-François Roubiliac (1702/5–1762) – French sculptor whose works reside in Westminster Abbey
- Samuel Scott (1702–1770) – British landscape painter
- James Seymour (c.1702–1752) – English painter especially of equestrian art
- William Hoare (c.1707–1792) – English painter especially of pastels
- Francis Hayman (1708–1776) – English painter, illustrator, and one of the founding members of the Royal Academy
- Arthur Devis (c.1712–1787) – English portrait painter, especially of conversation pieces and other small portraits
- Allan Ramsay (1713–1784) – Scottish portrait painter
- Richard Wilson (1713–1782) – Welsh landscape painter and one of the founder members of the Royal Academy
- Alexander Cozens (c.1717–1786) – British landscape painter in watercolours and a published teacher of painting
- Charles Brooking (1723–1759) – English painter
- Joshua Reynolds (1723–1792) – English painter specialising in portraits
- George Stubbs (1724–1806) – British painter especially of horses
- James Lambert (1725–1788) – English landscape painter
- Francis Cotes (1726–1770) – English painter
- Thomas Gainsborough (1727–1788) – English portrait and landscape painter
- Paul Sandby (1731–1809) – English map-maker turned landscape painter in watercolours
- Sawrey Gilpin (1733–1807) – English animal painter
- Johann Zoffany (1733–1810) – German neoclassical painter, active mainly in England
- George Romney (1734–1802) – English portrait painter
- Joseph Wright (1734–1797) – English landscape and portrait painter
- Alexander Runciman (1736–1785) – Scottish painter of historical and mythological subjects
- Mary Black (c.1737–1814) – English portrait painter
- Joseph Nollekens (1737–1823) – sculptor from London
- Francis Towne (1739/40–1816) – English watercolour painter
- Angelica Kauffman (1741–1807) – Swiss-Austrian painter
- Philip James de Loutherbourg (1740–1812) – English artist of French origin
- William Marlow (1740–1813) – English landscape and marine artist
- John Hamilton Mortimer (1740–1779) – British Neoclassical painter especially of romantic paintings
- Matthew William Peters (1742–1814) English portrait painter
- James Barry (1741–1806) – Irish painter
- Henry Fuseli (1741–1825) – British painter, draughtsman, and writer on art, of German-Swiss origin
- Richard Cosway (1742–1821) – English portrait painter, miniaturist
- Ozias Humphry (1742–1810) – English painter of portrait miniatures
- John Robert Cozens (1752–1797) – English draftsman and painter of romantic watercolor landscapes
- Thomas Bewick (1753–1828) – English wood engraver and ornithologist
- Thomas Stothard (1755–1834 – English painter and engraver
- Prince Hoare (1755–1834) – painter and dramatist
- Henry Raeburn (1756–1823) – Scottish portrait painter
- Thomas Rowlandson (1757–1827) – English artist and caricaturist
- William Blake (1757–1827) – English poet, painter, and printmaker
- Franz Bauer (1758–1840) – Austrian-born painter of botany. Long time residence at Kew Gardens as Botanic Painter to George III
- Alexander Nasmyth (1758–1840) – Scottish portrait and landscape painter
- Lemuel Francis Abbott (1760–1803) – English portrait painter
- Thomas Lawrence (1760–1830) – English painter, mostly of portraits
- Charles Fairfield (1761?–1805) – English painter, mostly known as a copyist
- John Opie (1761–1807) – English painter, known as the "Cornish Wonder"
- John Charles Felix Rossi (1762–1839) – sculptor
- Arthur William Devis (1762–1822) – English painter of history paintings and portraits
- George Morland (1763–1804) – English painter of animals and rustic scenes
- Joshua Cristall (1767–1847) – Cornish watercolour painter
- John Crome (1768–1821) – English artist, founder of the Norwich school of painters
- Martin Archer Shee (1769–1850) – Irish painter and President of the Royal Academy
- Thomas Lawrence (1769–1830) – English portrait painter and President of the Royal Academy
- James Ward (1769–1859) – English painter, particularly of animals, and an engraver
- Thomas Phillips (1770–1845) – English portrait and subject painter
- Henry James Richter (1772–1857) – engraver and painter
- François Hüet Villiers (1772–1813) – French-born portrait painter, resident in London
- Anne Frances Byrne (1775–1837) – painter of flowers and still lifes
- Thomas Girtin (1775–1802) – English painter, watercolourist, and etcher
- Sir John Dean Paul, 1st Baronet (1775–1852) – painter of landscapes and horses
- J. M. W. Turner (1775–1851) – English Romantic landscape painter, watercolourist and printmaker
- John Constable (1776–1837) – English Romantic painter
- John Higton (1776–1827) – English painter, particularly of animals, and an engraver
- Maria Spilsbury (1776–1820) – painter of religious subjects
- John Masey Wright (1777–1866) – watercolour painter
- John Varley (1778–1842) – English watercolour painter and astrologer
- Augustus Wall Callcott (1779–1844) – English landscape painter
- Samuel Colman (1780–1845) – English painter
- Samuel Lane (1780–1859) – English portrait painter
- James Holworthy (1781–1841) – watercolour painter
- John Sell Cotman (1782–1842) – artist of the Norwich school, mainly in watercolour
- Frederick Nash (painter) (1782–1856) – architectural and landscape painter
- David Cox (1783–1859) – English landscape painter
- Samuel Prout (1783–1852) – English watercolour painter
- Peter De Wint (1784–1849) – English landscape painter
- John Romney (1785–1863) – mainly printmaking and watercolour
- David Wilkie (1785–1841) – Scottish painter
- William Mulready (1786–1863) – Irish genre painter living in London
- Benjamin Haydon (1786–1846) – English historical painter and writer
- Anthony Vandyke Copley Fielding (1787-1855) - English watercolor painter of landscapes
- Patrick Nasmyth (1787–1831) – Scottish landscape painter
- John Martin (1789–1854) – English painter
- William Henry Hunt (1790–1864) – English watercolor painter
- George Hayter (1792–1871) English painter, specialising in portraits
- John Linnell (1792–1882) – English landscape painter
- Francis Danby (1793–1861) – Irish painter
- Clarkson Stanfield (1793–1867) – English painter of romantic seascapes
- David Roberts (1796–1864) – Scottish painter known particularly for his cityscapes
- Edward Calvert (1799–1883) – English printmaker and painter
- James Holland (1799–1870) – landscape painter and illustrator
- Charles Landseer (1799–1879) – English history painter, brother of Edwin Landseer
- David Ogborne (died 1800/1) – English painter of events and curiosities in Essex
- Eglington Margaret Pearson (died 1823) – stained glass painter
- Cosmo Armstrong (died 1847) – English line-engraver

== Born 1800–1899 ==
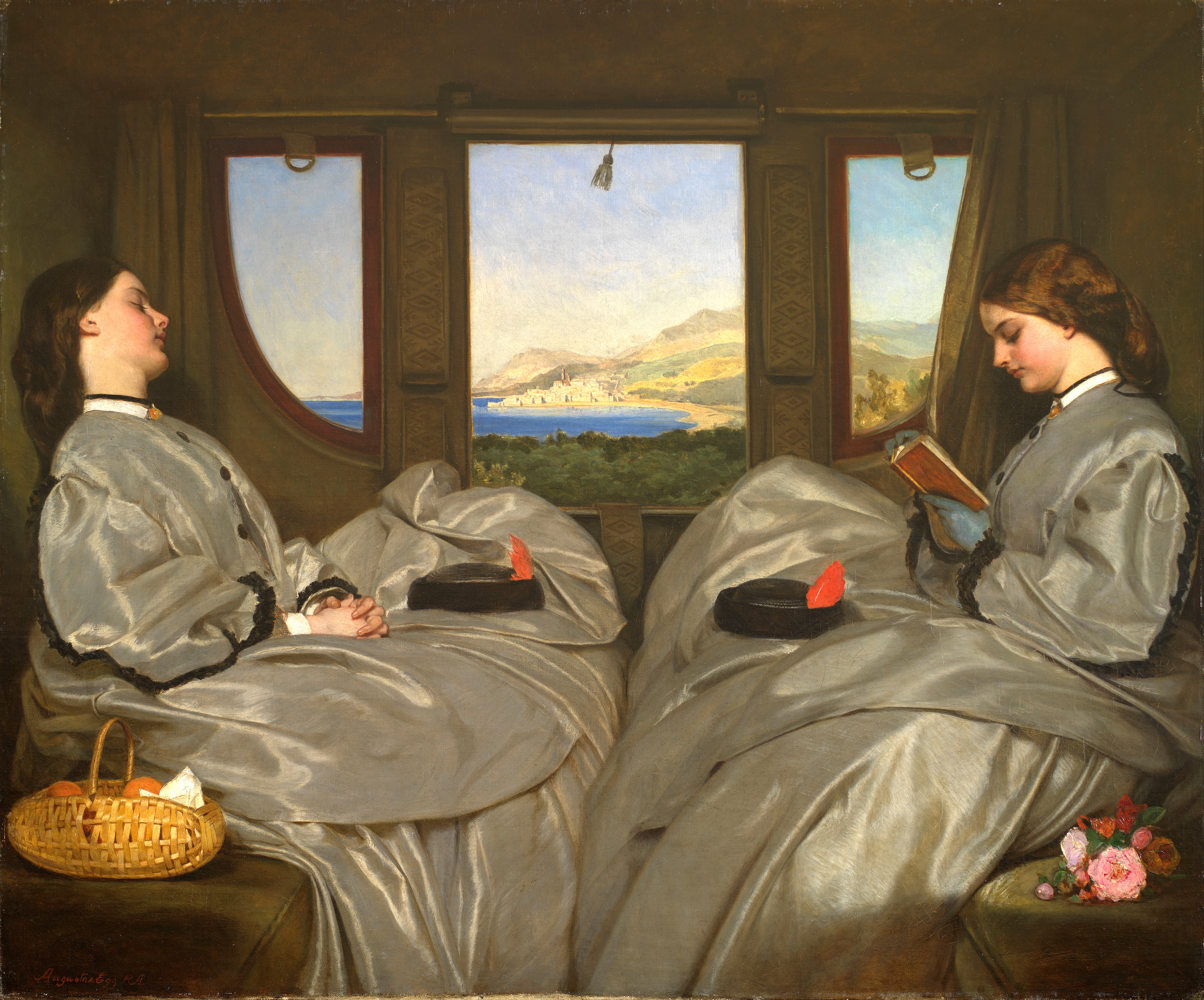
Augustus Leopold Egg, The Travelling Companions, 1862

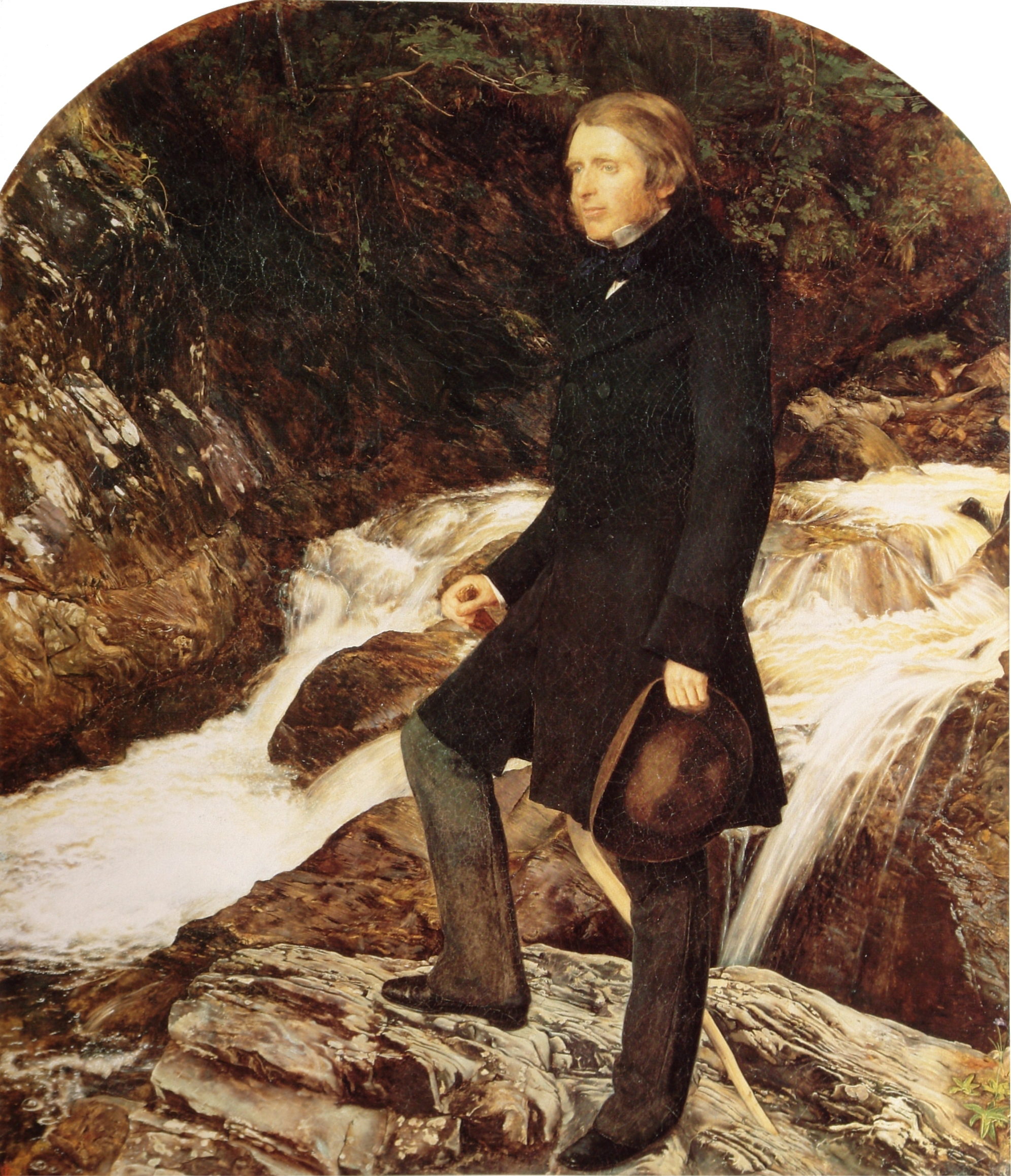
John Ruskin by the Pre-Raphaelite artist John Everett Millais, 1853–1854, Ashmolean Museum, Oxford

- Richard Parkes Bonington (1802–1828) – English Romantic landscape painter
- Edwin Henry Landseer (1802–1873) – English painter and sculptor especially of animals, particularly horses, dogs, and stags
- Thomas Shotter Boys (1803–1874) – English watercolourist
- Thomas Sidney Cooper (1803–1902) – English painter especially of cattle and farm animals
- John Steell (1804–1891) – Scottish sculptor
- John Frederick Lewis (1804–1876) – Orientalist English painter
- Samuel Palmer (1805–1881) – English landscape painter, etcher, and printmaker
- William Dyce (1806–1864) – Scottish artist
- John Greville Fennell (1807–1885) – landscape painter
- Arthur Elliot (1809–1892) – British watercolourist
- Thomas Mogford (1809–1868) – English portrait painter and landscape painter
- James John Hill (1811–1882) – English painter
- Edmund John Niemann (1813–1876) – English painter
- Alfred Elmore (1815–1881) – Irish-born painter of genre scenes. Member of The Clique
- Lucette Barker (1816–1905) – English painter
- William James Blacklock (1816–1858) – English landscape artist, painting scenery in Cumbria, the Lake District and the Scottish Borders
- Augustus Leopold Egg (1816–1863) – English painter of genre and historical scenes. Member of The Clique
- Edward Matthew Ward (1816–1879) – English painters of historical scenes. Member of The Clique
- Edward Armitage (1817–1896) – English Victorian era painter especially of historical, classical and biblical subjects
- Branwell Brontë (1817–1848) – English portrait painter; one of the Brontë children, brother of Anne, Emily and Charlotte; occasional poet and writer
- Richard Dadd (1817–1886) – English painter especially of fairies and other supernatural subjects, Orientalist scenes, and enigmatic genre scenes. Member of The Clique
- Walter Hood Fitch (1817–1892) – Scottish botanist and botanical artist
- Henry Nelson O'Neil (1817–1880) – Russian-born English painter of history and genre scenes. Member of The Clique
- John Phillip (1817–1867) – Scottish painter known for his depictions of Spain. Member of The Clique
- Alfred Tippinge (1817–1898) – British Grenadier Guard who sent home paintings of the Crimean War
- George Frederic Watts (1817–1904) – English Victorian painter and sculptor of the Symbolist movement
- William Hemsley (1819–1906) – English genre painter; vice president of the Society of British Artists
- William Powell Frith (1819–1909) – English painter specialising in portraits and Victorian era narratives. Member of The Clique
- James Sant (1820–1916) – English court and society painter
- George Gammon Adams (1821–1898)- English sculptor and medallist
- Ford Madox Brown (1821–1893) – English painter of moral and historical subjects
- Lefevre James Cranstone (1822–1893) – English painter, known for paintings of antebellum America
- Frances Emilia Crofton (1822–1910) – Anglo-Irish artist
- Frederick Goodall (snr) (1822–1904) – English artist specialising in oriental scenes
- Frederick William Keyl (1823–1871) – German-born British painter of animals
- Charles Davidson (1824–1902) – English watercolour painter
- Henry Alexander Bowler (1824–1903) – English painter and academic
- Abraham Solomon (1824–1862) – English painter
- Thomas Woolner (1825–1892) – English sculptor and poet
- Barbara Bodichon (1827–1891) – English educationalist and landscape artist
- William Holman Hunt (1827–1910) – British painter, founder of the Pre-Raphaelite Brotherhood
- Robert Taylor Pritchett (1828–1907) – English watercolourist and illustrator
- Dante Gabriel Rossetti (1828–1882) – English poet, illustrator, painter and translator
- Anna Blunden (1829–1915) – English painter
- James Docharty (1829–1878) – Scottish landscape painter
- Edwin Long (1829–1890) – English orientalist painter, depicting Biblical and Middle Eastern subjects
- John Everett Millais (1829–1896) – English painter and illustrator and one of the founders of the Pre-Raphaelite Brotherhood
- John Henry Dell (1830–1888) – English painter and illustrator
- Alfred William Hunt (1830–1896) – English painter
- Frederic Leighton (1830–1896) – English painter and sculptor especially of historical, biblical and classical subject matter
- Charles James Lewis (1830–1892) – English painter in oils and watercolours
- Marianne North (1830–1890) – English naturalist and flower painter
- Walter Severn (1830–1904) – English watercolourist
- John William Bailey (1831–1914) – British miniature painter
- Benjamin Williams Leader (1831–1923) – English painter
- Louise Rayner (1832–1924) – English watercolourist
- Arthur Hughes (1832–1915) – English painter and illustrator associated with the Pre-Raphaelite Brotherhood
- William Quiller Orchardson (1832–1910) – Scottish portraitist and painter of domestic and historical subjects
- Daniel Charles Grose (1832–1900) – English painter
- Edward Burne-Jones (1833–1898) – English artist and designer
- Joseph Clark (1834–1926) – English oil painter of domestic scenes
- William Morris (1834–1896) – English artist, writer, and socialist
- James McNeill Whistler (1834–1903) – American-born, British-based painter and etcher
- Wyke Bayliss (1835–1906) – English painter of churches and cathedrals
- William McTaggart (1835–1910) – Scottish landscape painter
- Peter Graham (1836–1921) – Scottish painter of Highland landscapes
- Arthur Boyd Houghton (1836–1875) – British painter (oil and watercolours) and illustrator
- John Atkinson Grimshaw (1836–1893) – English painter especially of landscapes
- Lawrence Alma-Tadema (1836–1912) – Dutch-born British classical-subject painter
- James Tissot (1836–1902) – French-born painter of portraits as well as genre subjects
- John Sowden (1838–1926) – English watercolourist
- Horatio Joseph Lucas (1839–1873) – English artist
- Simeon Solomon (1840–1905) – English Pre-Raphaelite painter
- Frederick Walker (1840–1875) – English Social Realist painter and illustrator in watercolours and oils
- Albert Moore (1841–1893) – English painter especially of languorous female figures set against the luxury and decadence of the classical world
- Alexander Rossi (1841–1916) – British artist specializing in genre works
- Thomas Bush Hardy (1842–1897) – British marine painter and watercolourist
- William John Seward Webber (1842–1919) – English sculptor
- Lucy Madox Brown (1843–1894) – English painter and watercolourist
- Alyce Thornycroft (1844 – 1906) – English sculptor and painter
- Walter Crane (1845–1915) – English artist and book illustrator
- Frank Holl (1845–1888) – English painter
- Walter Greaves (1846–1930) – English painter
- James Campbell Noble (1846–1913) – Scottish landscape, seascape and portrait painter
- John Eyre (1847–1927) – English genre painter, illustrator, painted and designed pottery
- Ralph Hedley (1848–1913) – English realist painter, woodcarver and illustrator
- John William Waterhouse (1849–1917) – English Pre-Raphaelite painter especially of female characters from mythology and literature
- Henry Richard Hope-Pinker (1850–1927) – English sculptor
- John Collier (1850–1934) – British writer and painter in the Pre-Raphaelite style
- Robert Weir Allan (1851–1942) – Glasgow-born painter of landscape and marine subjects
- John Charles Dollman (1851–1934) – English narrative, landscape and animal painter
- Edward Robert Hughes (1851–1914) – English painter in a Pre-Raphaelitism and Aestheticism style
- Edmund Leighton (1853–1922) – English painter in Pre-Raphaelite and Romantic styles
- Frank Dicksee (1853–1928) – English Victorian painter and illustrator especially of dramatic historical and legendary scenes
- Maude Goodman (1853–1938) (a.k.a. Matilda Scanes) – English Victorian fine art painter and children's book illustrator, Romantic genre paintings
- Caroline Gotch (1854–1945) – English painter associated with the Newlyn School of artists
- Walter Dendy Sadler (1854–1923) – English painter
- Alfred Wallis (1855–1942) – Cornish fisherman and artist
- David Winder (1855–1933) – Bolton, Lancashire-born British artist; oil and watercolour
- James Pittendreigh MacGillivray (1856–1938) – Scottish sculptor
- Alfred William Rich (1856–1921) – English landscape artist
- John Singer Sargent (1856–1925) – Expatriate American living in England; leading portrait painter of his era, landscape painter and watercolourist
- Richard Caton Woodville (1856–1927) – English artist, and illustrator especially of battle scenes
- Joseph Benwell Clark (1857–1938) – English landscape painter and book illustrator
- Stanhope Forbes (1857–1947) – British artist, founder of the Newlyn School
- Arthur Hacker (1858–1919) – English classicist painter
- Henry Scott Tuke (1858–1929) – English painter who lived in Cornwall, best known for his maritime paintings and male nudes
- Walter Sickert (1860–1942) – English Impressionist painter
- Solomon Joseph Solomon (1860–1927) – English painter of mythological scenes and portraits
- Philip Wilson Steer (1860–1942) – English artist
- Harriet Isabel Adams (1863–1952) – British artist and illustrator
- Lily Delissa Joseph (1863–1940) – English painter
- Charles Edgar Buckeridge (1864–1898) – church decorative artist
- Archibald Standish Hartrick (1864–1950) – Scottish painter
- Arthur Wardle (1864–1949) – English painter
- William Edwin Pimm (1864–1952) – British artist, oil and watercolours
- Thomas Edwin Mostyn (1864–1930) – English painter
- Arthur Lowe (painter) (1865–1940) – English landscape artist from Kinoulton, Nottingham
- Robert Bevan (1865–1925) – British painter
- H. Gustave Hiller (1865–1946) – mainly of stained glass
- Roger Fry (1866–1934) – English artist and art critic
- Henry Charles Fehr (1867–1940) – English sculptor
- Norah Fulcher (1867–1945) – English watercolour portrait artist
- Mabel Lee Hankey (1867–1943) – English artist, mainly of miniature portraits painted in watercolour on ivory
- Frank Brangwyn (1867–1956) – Welsh artist, painter, watercolourist, virtuoso engraver and illustrator, and progressive designer
- J M Balliol Salmon (1868–1953) – British painter
- Charles Murray Padday (1868–1954) – English painter
- Ursula Wood (1868–1925) – English painter
- Lamorna Birch (1869–1955) – English painter
- Lucy Kemp-Welch (1869–1958) – English equine artist
- Henry Crocket (1870–1926) – landscape painter
- William Ratcliffe (1870–1955) – English artist
- Phelan Gibb (1870–1948) – British artist and early modernist, painting in Paris 1910–1914
- Sholto Johnstone Douglas (1871–1958) – Scottish artist
- Florence Engelbach (1872–1951) – English painter born in Spain
- Alfred Garth Jones (1872–1955) – English artist and illustrator
- Edith Maryon (1872-1924) - English sculptor
- William Nicholson (1872–1949) – English painter, illustrator and author of children's books
- Aubrey Beardsley (1872–1898) – English illustrator and author especially of erotic illustrations
- Eleanor Fortescue-Brickdale (1872–1945) – English artist and illustrator
- Louie Burrell (1873–1971) – English painter
- Francis William Doyle Jones (1873–1938) – English sculptor
- Isabel Codrington (1874–1943) – English painter
- John Duncan Fergusson (1874–1961) – Scottish artist, one of the Scottish Colourists school of painting
- Hilda May Gordon (1874–1972) – British watercolourist
- Frank O. Salisbury (1874–1962) – English painter known for his portraits and historical and mythological works
- Dorothea Sharp (1874–1955) – British landscape painter
- Eleanor Best (1875–1957) – portrait and figure painter
- Evelyn Cheston (1875–1929) – English landscape painter
- Alice Kirkby Goyder (1875–1964) – English painter and etcher
- Arthur Henry Knighton-Hammond (1875–1970) – English painter best known for landscapes, society portraits, and industrial paintings
- Henry Bates Joel (1875–1922) – English landscape painter
- Margaret Fisher Prout (1875–1963) – English painter
- Walter Dexter (1876–1958) – English oil and watercolour artist, particularly of Norfolk
- Harold Gilman (1876–1919) – English artist and founder-member of the Camden Town Group
- Gwen John (1876–1939) – Welsh artist
- Horace Tuck (1876–1951) – Norfolk artist of oil and watercolour landscapes
- Florence Mabel Hollams (1877–1963) – painter of dogs and horses
- Laura Knight (1877–1970) – British artist
- Frank Cadogan Cowper (1877–1958) – English artist
- Donald Maxwell (1877–1936) – English illustrator and painter in oils and watercolours
- Hilda Annetta Walker (1877–1960) – English sculptor and painter
- Denis Eden (1878–1949) – painter and illustrator
- Charles Ginner (1878–1952) – French-born painter, member of Camden Town Group
- Spencer Gore (1878–1914) – British painter who was the first president of the Camden Town Group
- Augustus John (1878–1961) – Welsh painter, draughtsman, and etcher
- Louis Frederick Roslyn (1878–1940) – English sculptor
- Sir Alfred James Munnings KCVO, PRA (1878–1959) – English artist, particularly renowned for equine subject matter
- Ada Hill Walker (1879–1955) – scientific illustrator and artist
- William Reid Dick (1879–1961) – Scottish sculptor
- Vanessa Bell (1879–1961) – English painter and interior designer
- Gertrude Harvey (1879–1966) – English landscape painter
- Matthew Smith (1879–1959) – English painter
- Malcolm Drummond (1880–1945) – English artist, noted for his paintings of urban scenes and interiors
- Jacob Epstein (1880–1959) – American-born sculptor who worked chiefly in the UK, where he pioneered modern sculpture
- Elsie Henderson (1880–1967) – English painter and sculptor
- Harry Morley (1881–1943) – English painter
- Eric Gill (1882–1940) – British sculptor, typeface designer, stonecutter and printmaker
- Percy Wyndham Lewis (1882–1957) – English painter and author
- Henry Lamb (1883–1960) – Australian-born British painter
- Victoria Monkhouse (1883–1970) – English painter
- Arthur Watts (1883–1935) – illustrator
- Montague Birrell Black (1884–1964) – English illustrator and painter
- Elinor Proby Adams (1885–1945) – English painter
- Duncan Grant (1885–1978) – Scottish painter and member of the Bloomsbury Group
- Gwen Raverat (1885–1957) – English wood engraving artist who co-founded the Society of Wood Engravers
- Randolph Schwabe (1885–1948) – English artist
- Edmund Blampied (1886–1966) – British Channel Islander artist known especially for etchings and drypoints
- Joseph Hermon Cawthra (1886–1971) – English sculptor
- Maxwell Gordon Lightfoot (1886–1911) – English painter
- Austin Osman Spare (1886–1956) – English artist and occultist
- L. S. Lowry (1887–1976) – English artist
- Elizabeth Polunin (1887–1950) – English artist and theatre designer
- Arthur James F. Bond (1888–1958) – English painter of maritime subjects
- Sydney Carline (1888–1929) – English artist
- David Dougal Williams (June 1888–28 September 1944) – British artist and art teacher
- Margaret Lindsay Williams (1888–1960) – Welsh portrait painter
- Edith Grace Wheatley (1888–1970) – English painter
- Robert Gibbings (1889–1958) – Irish artist and author known especially as a wood engraver and for books on travel and natural history
- Paul Nash (1889–1946) – English war artist
- Christopher Nevinson (1889–1946) – English painter and vorticist
- Ruth Simpson (1889–1964) – English portrait painter
- Edward Wadsworth (1889–1949) – English artist
- David Bomberg (1890–1957) – English painter and one of the Whitechapel Boys
- Charles Cundall (1890–1971) – English painter
- Joseph Gray (1890–1963) – English painter
- Nina Hamnett (1890–1956) – Welsh artist and writer
- Francis Helps (1890–1972) – English artist
- Edmond Xavier Kapp (1890–1978) – English artist
- Iain Macnab (1890–1967) – Scottish painter
- Olive Mudie-Cooke (1890–1925) – English painter
- Leon Underwood (1890–1975) – British sculptor, painter, and engraver
- Henri Gaudier-Brzeska (1891–1915) – French sculptor and vorticist
- Mark Gertler (1891–1939) – British portrait and landscape painter
- Stanley Spencer (1891–1959) – English painter
- Arthur Ralph Middleton Todd (1891–1966) – English portrait painter
- Daisy Smith (1891–1983) – English painter and watercolourist
- Elsa Fraenkel (1892–1975) – German-born British sculptor
- Colin Gill (1892–1940) – English painter
- Gilbert Spencer (1892–1978) – British painter
- Harold Sandys Williamson (1892–1978) – British painter
- John Armstrong (1893–1973) – British artist
- John Nash (1893–1977) – English painter, illustrator, and engraver
- Winifred Nicholson (1893–1981) – English painter
- Orovida Camille Pissarro (1893–1968) – English painter and etcher
- Leonard Squirrell (1893–1979) – English watercolourist and etcher
- Henry Matthew Talintyre (1893–1962) – British artist
- Flora Twort (1893–1985) – English painter who specialised in watercolours and pastels
- Henry Carr (1894–1970) – British painter
- Meredith Frampton (1894–1984) – British artist
- Alethea Garstin (1894–1978) – Cornish painter
- Ben Nicholson (1894–1982) – English abstract painter
- Dora Clarke (1895–1989) – English sculptor
- David Jones (1895–1974) – Welsh artist and British modernist poet
- William Roberts (1895–1980) – English painter and war artist
- Raymond Coxon (1896–1997) – British artist
- Leila Faithfull (1896–1994) – British artist
- Harry Barr (1896–1987) – English painter
- John Buckland Wright (1897–1954) – New Zealand-born illustrator
- Harold Williamson (1898–1972) – British painter, designer, etcher and teacher
- Henry Moore (1898–1986) – English artist and sculptor
- Rodney Joseph Burn (1899–1984) – English artist
- Winifred Knights (1899–1947) – English painter

== Born 1900–1949 ==
- Joseph Mellor Hanson (1900–1963)
- Ursula Edgcumbe (1900–1985)
- Barbara Greg (1900–1983)
- George Lambourn (1900–1977)
- Roland Penrose (1900–1984)
- Harold Tamblyn-Watts (1900–1999)
- Gertrude Hermes (1901–1983)
- Elsie Dalton Hewland (1901–1979)
- Ancell Stronach (1901–1981) – Professor of Mural Painting at the Glasgow School of Art
- Christopher Wood (1901–1930)
- Marjorie Frances Bruford (1902–1958)
- Jean Clark (1902–1999)
- Frank Barrington Craig (1902–1951)
- Aileen Eagleton (1902–1984)
- Simon Elwes (1902–1975)
- Robin Guthrie (1902–1971)
- Barbara Hepworth (1903–1975)
- Ray Howard-Jones (1903–1996)
- Charles Mahoney (1903–1968)
- John Piper (1903–1992)
- Eric Ravilious (1903–1942)
- Richard Eurich (1903–1992)
- Ceri Richards (1903–1971)
- Albert Houthuesen (1903–1979)
- Graham Sutherland (1903–1980)
- Mary Adshead (1904–1995)
- Peggy Angus (1904–1993)
- Celia Frances Bedford (1904–1959)
- Helen Binyon (1904–1979)
- Stephen Bone (1904–1958)
- Evan Charlton (1904–1984)
- Griselda Allan (1905–1987)
- Reg Bunn (1905–1971)
- Edward Burra (1905–1976)
- Kathleen Guthrie (1905–1981)
- Eliot Hodgkin (1905–1987)
- Morris Kestelman (1905–1998)
- Kenneth Martin (1905–1984)
- Robert Medley (1905–1994)
- Vernon Ward (1905–1985)
- Rex Whistler (1905–1944)
- Kathleen Allen (1906–1983)
- Evelyn Dunbar (1906–1960)
- Patrick Hall (1906–1992)
- Joan Hassall (1906–1988)
- Edgar Hubert (1906–1985)
- Ronald Lampitt (1906–1988)
- Kenneth Steel (1906–1970)
- Reginald Ben Davis (1907–1998)
- Phyllis Ginger (1907–2005)
- James McIntosh Patrick (1907–1998) – Scottish landscape painter
- Brenda Landon, later Brenda Pye (1907–2005)
- Claude Rogers (1907–1979)
- William Coldstream (1908–1987)
- Isobel Heath (1908–1989)
- Norman Hepple (1908–1994)
- Victor Pasmore (1908–1998)
- Stella Schmolle (1908–1975)
- Carel Weight (1908–1997)
- Francis Bacon (1909–1992) – born in Ireland
- Dorothea Braby (1909–1987)
- Thomas Carr (1909–1999)
- Leonard Daniels (1909–1998)
- Paul Lucien Dessau (1909–1999)
- Harold Frank Hoar (1909–1976)
- Gwynneth Holt (1909–1995) – ivory sculptor
- Leslie Hurry (1909–1978)
- Eric Taylor (1909–1999)
- Geoffrey Tibble (1909–1952)
- Isabel Alexander (1910–1996)
- Pamela Drew (1910–1989)
- Bernard Hailstone (1910–1987)
- Rodrigo Moynihan (1910–1990)
- Rosemary Allan (1911–2008)
- Phyllis Bray (1911–1991)
- John Kingsley Cook (1911–1994)
- Anthony Devas (1911–1958)
- Roger Hilton (1911–1975)
- Nicolette Macnamara (1911–1987)
- Gwen Barnard (1912–1988)
- Andrew Freeth (1912–1986)
- Erlund Hudson (1912–2011)
- Georgina Hunt (1912–2012)
- Keith Vaughan (1912–1977)
- Reg Butler (1913–1981)
- Raymond Teague Cowern (1913–1986)
- Joan Hutt (1913–1985)
- Leonard Rosoman (1913–2012)
- Lynn Chadwick (1914–2003)
- Harold Hitchcock (1914–2009)
- Frances Macdonald (1914–2002)
- Charles Mozley (1914–1991)
- Frank Roper (1914–2000) – sculptor
- Doris Blair (born 1915)
- Mary Fedden (1915–2012)
- Dennis Flanders (1915–1994)
- Wendy F. Walsh (1915–2014) – illustrator and botanical artist
- Norman Whitehead (1915–1983)
- Eileen Aldridge (1916–1990)
- John Bridgeman (1916–2004)
- Margaret Thomas (1916–2016) – painter
- James Lawrence Isherwood (1917–1989)
- John Kashdan (1917–2001)
- Anthony Robert Klitz (1917–2000)
- John Minton (1917–1957)
- Mona Moore (1917–2000)
- Estella Campavias (1918–1990)
- John Kyffin Williams (1918–2006)
- Peter Lanyon (1918–1964)
- Richard Vicary (1918–2006) – printmaker
- Eden Box (1918–1988)
- Mary Audsley (1919–2008)
- Norman Cornish (1919–2014)
- Colin Hayes (1919–2003)
- Cliff Holden (1919–2020)
- Peter Wright (1919–2003)
- Michael Ford (1920–2005)
- Adrian Heath (1920-1992)
- Patrick Heron (1920–1999)
- Robert Tavener (1920–2004)
- Françoise Taylor (1920–2007) – born in Belgium, British by marriage
- Derek Chittock (1922–1986)
- Lucian Freud (1922–2011)
- Richard Hamilton (1922–2011)
- Eduardo Paolozzi (1924–2005)
- Miles Richmond (1922–2008)
- Pamela Ascherson (1923–2010)
- William McLaren (1923–1987)
- Anthony Caro (1924–2013)
- Anthony Earnshaw (1924–2001)
- Keith Sutton (1924–1991)
- Beryl Cook (1926–2008)
- Ian Hamilton Finlay (1925–2006)
- Michael Edmonds (1926–2014)
- Leon Kossoff (1926–2019)
- Edna Mann (1926–1985)
- Tom McGuinness (1926–2006)
- Eric Rimmington (1926–2024)
- Patrick Swift (1927–1983) – born in Ireland
- Greta Tomlinson (1927–2021)
- Michael Andrews (1928–1995)
- John Copnall (1928–2007)
- Dora Holzhandler (1928–2015) – born in Paris to Polish parents but lived in London
- Elizabeth Jane Lloyd (1928–1995)
- Dorothy Mead (1928–1975)
- John Riley (1928–2010)
- John Scanes (1928–2004)
- Joe Tilson (born 1928)
- Victor Willing (1928–1988)
- Barbara Balmer (1929–2017)
- Zelda Nolte (1929–2003)
- Fred Cuming (1930–2022)
- Mardi Barrie (1930–2004)
- Robyn Denny (1930–2014)
- David Gentleman (born 1930)
- Donald Pass (1930–2010)
- Erich von Götha de la Rosière (born 1930)
- Frank Auerbach (born 1931)
- Dennis Creffield (1931–2018)
- Ken Messer (1931–2018)
- Malcolm Morley (1931–2018) – first winner of the Turner Prize in 1984
- Bridget Riley (born 1931)
- Valerie Thornton (1931–1991)
- Audrey Barker (1932–2002)
- Peter Blake (born 1932)
- Nina Carroll (1932–1990)
- Howard Hodgkin (1932–2017)
- Norman Douglas Hutchinson (1932–2010) – royal painter
- Ken Howard (1932–2022)
- R. B. Kitaj (1932–2007) – born in the United States
- Euan Uglow (1932–2000)
- Marc Vaux (born 1932)
- Ian Weatherhead (born 1932)
- Richard Allen (1933–1999)
- John Furnival (1933–2020) – artist of visual and concrete poetry
- Charles Lutyens (1933–2021) – painter, sculptor, and mosaicist
- Norman Perryman (born 1933)
- Vincent Haddelsey (1934–2010)
- John Hoyland (1934–2011)
- Colin Jones (born 1934) – systems artist
- Jeremy Moon (1934–1973)
- Garth Evans (born 1934) – sculptor
- Rose Wylie (born 1934) – painter
- Paula Rego (1935–2022) – born in Portugal
- Frank Bowling (born 1936)
- Tony Foster (born 1936) – painter
- Patrick Caulfield (1936–2005)
- David Hall (1937–2014)
- David Hockney (1937–2026)
- Allen Jones (born 1937)
- Tom Phillips (1937–2022)
- Pamela Scott Wilkie (born 1937)
- Margot Perryman (born 1938)
- Carole Steyn (born 1938)
- William Tillyer (born 1938)
- Terry Atkinson (born 1939)
- Rose Frain (born 1939)
- Anthony Green (1939–2023)
- Patrick Hughes (born 1939)
- Ian Hunter (1939–2017) – Dean of Saint Martin's School of Art
- John Walker (born 1939) – painter and printmaker
- John Byrne (born 1940)
- Peter Liddle (born 1940)
- Barry Flanagan (1941–2009)
- Yvonne Hutton (1941–1991)
- Geoffrey Key (born 1941)
- Robert Lenkiewicz (1941–2002)
- Peter Olley (born 1942)
- Ruth Rix (born 1942)
- Alan Aldridge (1938–2017)
- Grange Calveley (1943–2021)
- Errol Lloyd (born 1943)
- Osi Rhys Osmond (1943–2015)
- Graham Ovenden (1943–2022)
- Valerie Wiffen (born 1943)
- Zacron (1943–2012) – multimedia artist, writer, broadcaster
- Lindsay Bartholomew (born 1944)
- Sue Gollifer (born 1944) – printmaker and digital artist
- Bruce McLean (born 1944)
- David Paskett (born 1944)
- Ali Omar Ermes (born 1945)
- Maggi Hambling (born 1945)
- Ed Herring (1945–2003)
- Pete Hoida (1944-2023)
- Geoffrey Humphries (born 1945)
- David Imms (born 1945)
- Richard Long (born 1945)
- Val Archer (born 1946)
- Terance James Bond (1946–2023)
- Paul Dash (born 1946)
- Rose Garrard (born 1946)
- Winston Branch (born 1947)
- Paul Brown (born 1947) – digital artist
- Shelagh Cluett (1947–2007) – sculptor
- Richard Cook (born 1947)
- Tam Joseph (born 1947)
- Vikki Slowe (born 1947) – printmaker and painter
- Linda Sutton (born 1947)
- Godfrey Blow (born 1948)
- Pete Gilbert (born 1948) – graphic designer and painter
- Richard P. Cook (born 1949)
- Richard Deacon (born 1949) – 1987 Turner Prize Winner
- Paul Wager (born 1949) – painter and sculptor

== Born 1950–1999 ==
- Sam Ainsley (born 1950)
- Pauline Burbidge (born 1950), British textile artist, designer, and quiltmaker
- Alison Dunhill (born 1950)
- Antony Gormley (born 1950)
- Edward Allington (1951–2017)
- Humphrey Ocean (born 1951)
- Richard Spare (born 1951)
- Jeremy Henderson (1952–2009) – artist and painter
- Colin Nichols (born 1952)
- Tim Woolcock (born 1952) – modern British painter in the 1950s tradition
- Stephen Pusey (born 1952)
- Alan Rankle (born 1952) – landscape painter
- Jane Boyd (born 1953)
- Pogus Caesar (born 1953) – born in St Kitts
- Chris Gollon (1953–2017)
- Monica Petzal (born 1953) – painter and printmaker
- Ingrid Pollard (born 1953)
- Melinda Camber Porter (1953–2008) – painter, writer, filmmaker, and journalist
- Charles Thomson (born 1953)
- Martin Yeoman (born 1953)
- Michael Clark (artist) (born 1954)
- Lubaina Himid (born 1954)
- Aidan Hughes (born 1954)
- Anish Kapoor (born 1954)
- Vivien Blackett (born 1955)
- David Tress (born 1955)
- Denzil Forrester (born 1956)
- Errol Francis (born 1956)
- Malcolm McGookin (born 1956)
- Terry Smith (born 1956)
- James Dodds (born 1957)
- Jeremy Gardiner (born 1957)
- Fiona Graham-Mackay (born 1957) – portraits of the royal family
- Thomas Hodges (born 1957) – photographic and mixed media artist
- Panayiotis Kalorkoti (born 1957)
- Steve Pyke (born 1957)
- Willard Wigan (born 1957)
- Simon Beck (artist) (born 1958) – snow artist
- Sokari Douglas Camp (born 1958)
- Keith Coventry (born 1958)
- Lennie Lee (born 1958) – born in South Africa
- Jake Tilson (born 1958)
- Andy Dog Johnson (1959–2016)
- Claudette Johnson (born 1959)
- Hew Locke (born 1959) – born in Scotland
- Bruce Munro (born 1959)
- Keith Salmon (born 1959) – Scottish landscape painter born in England
- Suzzan Blac (born 1960)
- Eddie Chambers (born 1960)
- John Foulger (1960–2006)
- Isaac Julien (born 1960)
- Grayson Perry (born 1960)
- Nick Fudge (born 1960)
- Keith Piper (born 1960)
- Yinka Shonibare (born 1960)
- Julie Brook (born 1961)
- Jo Budd (born 1961)
- Sonia Boyce (born 1962)
- Jonathan S Hooper (born 1962)
- Marion Kalmus (born 1962)
- Sarah Lucas (born 1962)
- Paul Mellia (born 1962)
- Nick Miller (born 1962) – Irish painter born in England
- Janette Parris (born 1962)
- Nasser Azam (born 1963)
- Nicola Bealing (born 1963)
- Tracey Emin (born 1963)
- Robert Fogell (born 1963)
- Janette Parris (born 1963)
- Dean Stalham (born c.1963)
- Barbara Walker (born 1963)
- Gillian Wearing (born 1963) – 1997 Turner Prize winner
- Rachel Whiteread (born 1963) – 1993 Turner Prize winner
- Frances Aviva Blane (born 1964)
- Jonathan Ellery (born 1964)
- Simon Gales (born 1964)
- Hipkiss (born 1964)
- Rachel Ara (born 1965)
- Tom Cartmill (born 1965)
- Adam Chodzko (born 1965)
- Marion Coutts (born 1965)
- Guy Denning (born 1965)
- Damien Hirst (born 1965)
- Jonathan Huxley (born 1965)
- Robert Priseman (born 1965)
- Rupert Shrive (born 1965)
- Fiona Banner (born 1966)
- Fiona Crisp (born 1966) – photographer
- Ian Davenport (born 1966)
- Christian Furr (born 1966)
- Igor Kufayev (born 1966)
- Maria Marshall (born 1966)
- Elizabeth Price (born 1966) – 2012 Turner Prize winner
- Peter Brown (born 1967)
- Serena de la Hey (born 1967) – sculptor
- Andy Lomas (born 1967)
- Virginia Nimarkoh (born 1967)
- Paul Rooney (born 1967)
- Chris Ofili (born 1968)
- Suling Wang (born 1968)
- Brita Granström (born 1969)
- Chantal Joffe (born 1969)
- Jonathan Myles-Lea (1969–2021) – painter of country houses, historic buildings, and landscapes
- Michael Gustavius Payne (born 1969)
- Alexander Talbot Rice (born 1969) – society portrait painter
- Justin Mortimer (born 1970)
- Nina Murdoch (born 1970) – tempera painter
- Mandy Wilkinson (born 1970)
- Jonathan Kearney (born 1971)
- David Emmanuel Noel (born 1972)
- Anna Barriball (born 1972) – mixed media artist
- Dee Ferris (born 1973)
- Peter Liversidge (born 1973)
- Banksy (reportedly born 1974)
- Michael Takeo Magruder (born 1974) – new media and digital artist
- Tom Palin (born 1974)
- Stephen Wiltshire (born 1974) – savant artist
- Graham Nicholls (born 1975)
- Lucy Skaer (born 1975)
- Amanda Ansell (born 1976)
- Reuben Colley (born 1976)
- Adelaide Damoah (born c.1977)
- Maryam Hashemi (born 1977)
- Conrad Shawcross (born 1977)
- Lynette Yiadom-Boakye (born 1977)
- Claire Hooper (born 1978)
- David Spriggs (born 1978) – sculptor, installation artist
- Angela Wakefield (born 1978)
- Hannah Rickards (born 1979)
- Roopa Basu (born 1979)
- Fuller (born 1980)
- Nick Gentry (born 1980)
- Conor Harrington (born 1980)
- Edward Kluz (born 1980)
- Polly Morgan (born 1980)
- Stuart Semple (born 1980)
- Chris (Simpsons artist) (born 1983)
- Anna King (born 1984)
- Anthony Smith (born 1984) – bronze sculptor
- Vector Meldrew (born 1984)
- Sarah Maple (born 1985) – feminist artist, first New Sensations winner
- Emma Cousin (born 1986)
- Johan Andersson (born 1986)
- Nicola Frimpong (born 1987)
- Seb Toussaint (born 1988) – street artist and painter
- Nathan Wyburn (born 1989) – food artist
- The Connor Brothers (born 1980s)
- Emily Powell (born 1990)
- Sophie Green (born 1992)
- Bianca Raffaella (born 1992)
- Vanessa Lubach (fl 1990) – printmaker

== Born 2000 and later ==
- Kieron Williamson (born 2002) – English painter

== See also ==
- List of Manx artists
- List of artists from Northern Ireland
- List of Scottish artists
- List of Welsh artists
