= Peter Gilbert =

Peter Gilbert may refer to:

- Peter Gilbert (Welsh footballer) (born 1983), Welsh footballer and coach
- Pete Gilbert (artist) (born 1948), British artist
- Pete Gilbert (baseball) (1867–1912), baseball player
- Peter Gilbert (Australian footballer) (born 1948), former Australian rules footballer
- Peter Gilbert (composer) (born 1975), American composer and teacher of music composition
- Peter Gilbert (filmmaker), American documentary filmmaker
- Peter Gilbert (boxer) (1950-1976), New Zealand boxer
- Peter F. C. Gilbert (born 1944), English neuroscientist and biophysicist
