= A Bigger Interior with Blue Terrace and Garden 2017 =

2017 painting by David Hockney

- Artist: David Hockney
- Year: 2017
- Medium: Acrylic on canvas
- Dimensions: 120 cm × 240 cm (48 in × 96 in)
- Location: Private collection

A Bigger Interior with Blue Terrace and Garden 2017 is a painting by British artist David Hockney. Hockney completed the painting in 2017 and it is seen as one of his more famous contemporary works. It is an irregular shape, hexagonal with maximum dimensions of 48 by 96 inches (120 cm × 240 cm) and was made using acrylic paint.
