= Cartmill =

Cartmill is a surname. Notable people with the surname include:

- Cleve Cartmill (1908–1964), American science-fiction and fantasy writer; father of Matt Cartmill
- Matt Cartmill (born 1943), American evolutionary anthropologist and editor; son of Cleve Cartmill
- Tom Cartmill (born 1965), English painter
