= Crocket (disambiguation) =

A crocket is a hook-shaped decorative element common in Gothic architecture.

Crocket may also refer to:

- Chibodee Crocket, a fictional character in the television series Mobile Fighter G Gundam
- James Crocket Wilson (1841–1899), Canadian businessman and politician

== People with the surname Crocket ==
- Henry Crocket (1870–1926), English painter
- Oswald Smith Crocket (1868–1945), Canadian lawyer

== See also ==
- Crockett (disambiguation)
- Croquet
