= François Hüet Villiers =

François Hüet Villiers (14 January 1772 – 28 July 1813), born in Paris, was an artist resident in London for most of his career.

== Life ==
Villiers was born in Paris in 1772, the second son of Jean-Baptiste-Marie Hüet, a French artist, and his wife Marie-Geneviève née Chevalier. He studied under his father. He exhibited portraits at the Paris Salon in 1799, 1800, and 1801, and then settled in London. He adopted the name Villiers, from Villiers-sur-Orge where his father owned land.

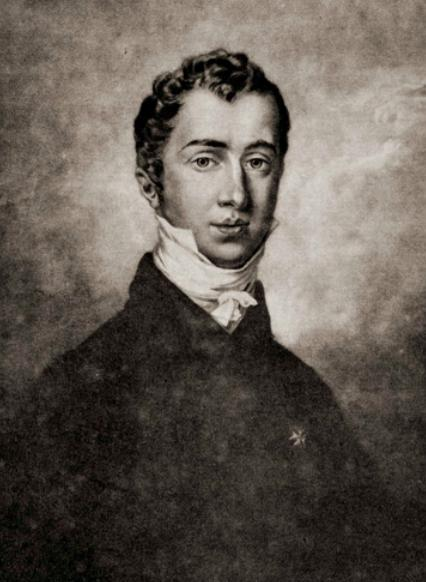
Gustav IV Adolf of Sweden, by Villiers (1811)

He was a versatile artist, drawing landscapes, animals, and architecture, but excelled in his portraits in miniature and oils. He was appointed miniature-painter to the Duke and Duchess of York, his portraits of whom were engraved, as were also those of Louis XVIII, the Duke and Duchess of Angoulême, the Duc d'Enghien, and Mrs Quentin (wife of George Augustus Quentin).

Villiers painted many actresses and other ladies in mythological characters, and his "Hebe" was very popular and frequently engraved. He exhibited largely at the Royal Academy of Art and other exhibitions from 1803 until his death, and was a member of the Associated Artists in Watercolours from 1807 to 1812. He published two sets of etchings: Rudiments of Cattle (1805) and Rudiments and Characters of Trees (1806–7), and made the drawings for some of the plates in R. Ackermann's History of the Abbey Church of St Peter's Westminster, its Antiquities and Monuments (1812). Villiers died in Great Marlborough Street, London, on 28 July 1813, and was buried in St Pancras churchyard.
