= Vernon Ward =

English painter

Vernon Beauvoir Ward (1905–1985) was a 20th-century English painter and commercial artist noted for his works of flowers, birds and Edwardian subjects and who lived for most of his life in Hampstead in London.

== Early life and education ==
He was born in Hampstead, the son of an art dealer, educated at St Joseph's Roman Catholic school in Highgate and trained at the Slade School of Art in London under Henry Tonks, Wilson Steer and Sir Walter Russell. He was the cousin of John Stanton Ward.

== Career ==
A member of the New Society of Artists, he was elected an associate of the Royal Society of British Artists in 1926 and exhibited at the Royal Society and the Royal Institute of Oil Painters. Ward was also a member of the New Society of Artists. During the war he worked on ambulance maintenance with the Civil Defence Service in Richmond. His work found particular favour in the commercial sector with publishers such as Solomon and Whitehead, Frost and Reed and W.N Sharpe of Bradford and reproductions of his work were often found on jigsaw puzzles, greetings cards and commercial prints. He painted a symbolic figure composition for the Free French during World War II and the Borough of Twickenham commissioned him to design a naval war memorial. He occasionally produced original works under the pseudonym Bertram Linder.
