= Paul Mellia =

British artist

Paul Mellia (born 1962) is an established UK artist and is the only artist officially licensed to reproduce Marvel images.

Born in Edinburgh, Scotland, in 1962, Paul began drawing comic book characters at the age of four. He is dyslexic. He has said, "I couldn't read the stories because the words were jumping around, so it didn't tell me the story. I wanted to draw it to make it look more real to me."

Mellia returned to the UK to establish his studio in London after working in Los Angeles with Disney and Marvel. An exhibition at the Sunset Boulevard Gallery in LA sold out, and Mellia's artwork has sold for prices as high as £59,000.
