= Margaret Fisher Prout =

British painter

Millicent Margaret Fisher Prout ARA (31 March 1875– 9 December 1963) was a British artist who helped improve perceptions of modern art in the UK.

== Biography ==
Prout was born in Church Street, Chelsea, on 31 March 1875, the only daughter of the painter Mark Fisher R.A. She studied under her father and at the Slade School of Art between 1894 and 1897. By 1914 she was teaching life drawing at the Hammersmith School of Arts and Crafts and had her first solo exhibition at the Beaux Arts Gallery in 1922.

Prout was a painter of flowers, landscape and figures in an Impressionist style. She produced various subjects including animals, landscapes, figures, flowers, and other still life. In 1908 she married a farmer, John Prout, and was based in various locations throughout her career including Harlow, Essex, London, Sawbridgeworth in Hertfordshire, East Grinstead and was most latterly associated with Sussex and remained there until her death in 1963. Prout often employed unconventional techniques in her artworks, for example by making studies in oil paint before completing a watercolour, she would use certain colours and pigments in unusual ways and sometimes poured water over a work to achieve her desired result. Portraits of women painting were a recurrent theme in such paintings as Breakfast in a Country Studio (1939) and An Artist at her Easel (1948).

Prout had an extensive career over a period of at least 58 years. She exhibited at the New English Art Club from 1897 (which was an alternative institution for showcasing artists as opposed to the Royal Academy of Arts, which was mostly unwelcoming to the work of female artists), the Royal Scottish Academy (1935), the Royal Hibernian Academy (1924–39), the Royal Glasgow Institute (1928–58) and the Royal Academy itself in 1921–64. She also exhibited with the Society of Women Artists (1927–63) and the Women's International Art Club, both institutions for the promotion of the work of women.

Prout was elected an associate member of the Royal Academy in 1948. She was a member of the Society of Women Artists from 1935 to 1937 and from 1952 to 1958 and was also a member of the New English Art Club.

Notable works included: Mare and Foal, Dusting the Mantlepiece, Study of a Girl Painting, The Looking Glass and Salthouse, Norfolk. A retrospective exhibition of Prout's work was held at the Worthing Art Gallery in 1961, the Royal Watercolour Society held a memorial exhibition in 1966 and Blond Fine Art also held a retrospective in 1979.
