= Norman Perryman =

British artist (born 1933)

Norman Perryman was born in Birmingham, England in 1933, was educated at the Worcester Royal Grammar School, and studied painting and art education at the Birmingham College of Art and Crafts, graduating with Honours in 1954. He emigrated to the Netherlands in 1957, then moved to Switzerland (Leysin 1966, Villars 1973 and Geneva 1975-77). He was Head of Art at Aiglon College (1967–73) and from 1976–1990 was Chief Examiner for the Visual Arts programme of the International Baccalaureate, designing and developing the Visual Art curriculum and traveling worldwide to give workshops on the role of the arts in education and the relationships of the visual arts and music. He returned to Holland in 1978 and now lives in Amsterdam.

Perryman has exhibited widely (in The Netherlands, U.K., Switzerland, Germany and the U.S.). His principal themes are portraits, landscapes, dance and in particular, music. He uses the fluid transparency of watercolour to convey the illusion of movement and the transient nature of music and dance. His work is both figurative and abstract expressionist. Perryman’s earliest paintings on musical themes stem from the early sixties. One of his first subjects was conductor Bernard Haitink in 1965, conducting the Royal Concertgebouw Orchestra in Amsterdam. This led to many 'action portraits' of other great musicians, such as the violinist Lord Yehudi Menuhin.

In 1990, Perryman was commissioned to paint a series of large watercolours of musical celebrities for Symphony Hall, Birmingham (UK). These include conductors Riccardo Chailly, Valery Gergiev, Andris Nelsons, Carlo Maria Giulini, Bernard Haitink, Kurt Masur and Sir Simon Rattle, violinists Sarah Chang, Kyung Wha Chung, Yehudi Menuhin and Itzhak Perlman, pianists Vladimir Ashkenazy and Alfred Brendel, singers Bryn Terfel, José Carreras, Dame Kiri Te Kanawa, Jessye Norman, Luciano Pavarotti, cellists Yo-Yo Ma and Mstislav Rostropovich. This collection is arguably one of the world's largest collections of musical subjects by the same artist. Included in this collection are the large works The Mahler Experience and Elgar’s Dream.

== Live Kinetic Painting as performance art ==
In 1973 Perryman began to work as a performing artist on glass plates placed on a series of overhead projectors, interpreting music visually in real time. In contrast to the trend of creating digitally generated video-projections, Perryman has developed a low-tech analogue alternative to produce huge projections of kinetic colours without pixels. As they listen to the music, the audience watches the evolution and dissolution of the semi-abstract visuals as Perryman paints them. The images from five or more projectors are mixed by hand with an analogue dimmer. Perryman calls this art-form kinetic painting, because the continuously changing sequence of colours and forms only exists in real time, then disappears forever. His paintbrushes also move to the rhythms of the music and make the liquid watercolour splash, pulsate, flow or spread continuously.

Perryman memorises the musical score, then paints his kinetic visual sequences to a carefully rehearsed graphic choreography - although an element of improvisation is always present. The musicians or dancers often stand or perform in these projections, thus becoming totally integrated in the visuals and reacting to them. Perryman’s techniques also provide an experience in synaesthesia, (the sensory cross-over where, for example, one sees colours on hearing music or hears music in visuals).

Since 1973 Perryman has performed frequently in this way for television and with modern-dance groups in Switzerland, France, England, Germany, Finland, the Netherlands and the USA. Perryman made the film “Esquisses” for Télévision Suisse Romande in 1976. In 1979 he performed his abstract impressions of Vivaldi's 'Four Seasons' for French Television with Yehudi Menuhin. An example of his kinetic painting with dance was the modern ballet Invention (co-created with Philip Taylor) for the Netherlands Dance Theater, to open the 1989 Holland Dance Festival.

In 1993, BBC Television made the documentary 'Concerto for Paintbrush and Orchestra', about Perryman's life and work with music. This included a performance of Mussorgsky’s 'Pictures at an Exhibition', with Sir Simon Rattle conducting the City of Birmingham Symphony Orchestra in Symphony Hall, where Perryman could be seen painting his own semi-abstract pictures, inspired by and synchronous to the music.

Perryman has also performed with José Carreras and the Hallé Orchestra (1994), with percussionist Evelyn Glennie (1998), Holland Symfonia (Ravel) (2004), the Rotterdam Philharmonic (2004), the Netherlands Chamber Orchestra (Stravinsky: The Soldier’s Tale) (2004), the Arnhem Philharmonic (2004) and with the Circle Percussion ensemble (frequently between 1978 and 2009). In 2005 he appeared with the Flemish Radio Orchestra in a performance of John Adams’ 'El Dorado' and toured Belgium with the Flemish Radio Choir in a programme entitled 'The Occupied City'. In 2006 he performed in Amsterdam in a Dutch version of Gertrude Stein’s chamber opera 'Dr. Faustus Lights the Lights', with music by Guus Janssen. At the 2007 Connecticut Greenwich Music Festival Perryman performed John Adams’ 'Hallelujah Junction' (with pianists Steven Beck and Andrew Armstrong). He has also performed several times in Abu Dhabi, Dubai and Qatar.

Asian painting and music have always influenced Perryman’s work, first in his early watercolours, then in performances. In 2004 he chose Toru Takemitsu’s 'From me flows what you call Time' for a performance with the Rotterdam Philharmonic. In 2005, with the Dutch ASKO Ensemble, he performed 'Confluences: Concerto No. 4', by the Chinese-American composer Huang Ruo at the Amsterdam International Contemporary Music Week. 2007 saw three concerts with the International Sejong Soloists (Augusta Read Thomas and Takemitsu) in the Great Mountains Music Festival, South Korea. He worked with Huang Ruo in 2008 to create 'Written on the Wind': a work for pipa, vocals and kinetic images. In 2009 he performed in the Amsterdam Muziekgebouw the first of a series with the Chinese trio Min/Wu/Xu. 2009 also saw performances in England with Charles Hazlewood in his "Play the Field" festival, in the Amsterdam Concertgebouw with the Netherlands Philharmonic. 2010 saw Perryman’s debut with the Royal Concertgebouw Orchestra (Scriabin: 'Poem of Ecstasy') and in 2013 the first performance of Scriabin’s 'Prometheus: Poem of Fire' with live kinetic paintings and the National Orchestra of Belgium in Brussels. Perryman toured "Piano Colours" with pianist Pierre Laurent-Aimard in 2012, and with violinist Daniel Hope and pianist Sebastian Knauer for the 2016 Menuhin Centenary in Konzerthaus Berlin and the Lübeck Schleswig-Holstein Festival. Then again with the Daniel Hope ensemble in l'Histoire du Soldat in Essen in 2018.

Perryman's final performance of lyrical kinetic painting live in concert was in Symphony Hall in 2019, with conductor Mirga Gražinytė-Tyla and the City of Birmingham Symphony Orchestra with "The Sea" by the artist/composer M.K.Čiurlionis.

== Solo exhibitions ==
Year	Location
1964	Wassenaar (Netherlands), Heuff Gallery
1965	Zürich, Bürdeke Gallery
1966	The Hague, Liernur Gallery
	Berne, Anlikerkeller Gallery
1967	Rotterdam, Kunstzaal Zuid Gallery
1968	Montreux (Switzerland), Picpus Gallery
1970	The Hague, Liernur Gallery
	Nijmegen (Netherlands), De Waag Gallery
	Apeldoorn (Netherlands), Municipal van Reekum Gallery
1971	Gstaad (Switzerland), Yehudi Menuhin Festival
1972	Fribourg (Switzerland), Galerie de la Cathédrale
1973	Les Diablerets (Switzerland), Festival Musique et Neige
	Lausanne, UNIP Gallery
1974	Delft, De Volle Maan Gallery
	Geneva, Le Petit Palais Museum
1975	Bournemouth (England), Minn’s Music Gallery
1976	Neuchâtel, Galerie Contact
	Carouge (Geneva), Galerie Delafontaine
1977	Laren (Netherlands), Singer Museum
	San Francisco, Bank of America Gallery
1978	Basel, Galerie Münsterberg
	Amsterdam, The Concertgebouw
1979	Amstelveen (Netherlands), Cultural Center
	Utrecht, Het Vredenburg Music Centre
1980	Frankfurt, Frankfurter Sparkasse Gallery
1981	Utrecht, Zwolsche Algemeene Gallery
1987	The Hague, Pullman Gallery
1988	Toledo (Ohio), Barrett Galleries
	Amsterdam, Dirks Gallery
1989	The Hague, Art Propos Gallery
1991	Amsterdam, Dirks Gallery
	Maastricht, Count & Brookman Gallery
1992	Amstelveen (Netherlands), Cultural Center
1999	Cropston (England), Severn Trent Gallery
2001	New York, The Gallery at Lincoln Center, Metropolitan Opera
	On permanent display: The Symphony Hall Collection, Birmingham (England)

== Performances of live visual music ==
Year	Event
1973	Video-Art Dance Group: London (The Roundhouse), Oxford, Southampton
1975	Created Groupe MIM (Musique, Images, Mouvement): multiple performances in Geneva
1976	Film Esquisses for Télévision Suisse Romande, with Groupe MIM
1977	Tour USA, Canada (Columbus, Tacoma, Montreal) with Vivian King (cello) and René Bazinet (mime)
1978	Tour with Circle Percussion, Utrecht, The Hague, Amsterdam
1979	Vivaldi’s Four Seasons with Yehudi Menuhin for France TV 2
1989	Modern Ballet Invention for Netherlands Dance Theatre, to music by Kabelač
1991	Education Project. Tour of schools in North Holland with Monique Copper (piano)
1993	Concerto for Paintbrush and Orchestra (50min. documentary and performance for BBC Television) with Sir Simon Rattle and the City of Birmingham Symphony Orchestra (Mussorgsky)
1994	An evening with José Carreras, Amanda Roocroft and the Hallé Orchestra
1998	An evening with Evelyn Glennie, City of London Festival
2002	Dutch tour with Circle Percussion (all Japanese programme)
2003	Amsterdam: with Harry Sparnaay (bass clarinet) and Evelyn Stoop (harp)
2004	Rotterdam Philharmonic (Takemitsu)
2004	Holland Symfonia and MTV (for Entrée, Concertgebouw) Shéhérazade
2004	Netherlands Chamber Orchestra, L’Histoire du Soldat, Concertgebouw
2004	Arnhem Philharmonic, Arnhem, Nijmegen, Apeldoorn (Mussorgsky)
2005	Flemish Radio Orchestra, Ghent and Mechelen (John Adams: Eldorado)
2005	Flemish Radio Choir, Belgian Tour (The Occupied City)
2005	ASKO Ensemble, Muziekgebouw (Confluences, by Huang Ruo)
2005	Opening of the DIFC, Dubai, Czech National Orchestra
2006	Amsterdam Bethanienklooster, Dr Faustus (Gertrude Stein, chamber opera)
2006	The Royal Awards, Abu Dhabi
2006	New York, Time Warner Center: Composer Portrait evening, with Huang Ruo
2007	Aiglon College, Switzerland with Julien Quentin (piano), Mussorgsky
2007	Greenwich Music Festival (Adams and Saint-Saens)
2007	Great Mountains Music Festival (South Korea) Sejong Soloists (Augusta Read Thomas and Takemitsu). Also a children’s concert, all for KBS Korean Television.
2007	ADNEC Corporate event in Abu Dhabi
2008	New York, Symphony Space and Purchase College NY (Huang Ruo)
2009	Qatar, Corporate event for Vodafone
2009	An Evening with Trio Min/Wu/Xu, Muziekgebouw, Amsterdam
2009	Play the Field Festival, with Charles Hazlewood (Vivaldi)
2009	Amsterdam Concertgebouw, Netherlands Philharmonic: Shostakovich, Liszt, Borodin
2009	Bozar, Brussels, National Orchestra of Belgium, with Dirk Brosse
2010	Royal Concertgebouw Orchestra (Scriabin: Poem of Ecstasy)
2011	Recordings for HQ Creative, Dubai
2012	Groningen, Lars Wouters van den Oudenweijer (clarinet) & Hans Eijsackers (piano). Berg, Berio, Brahms
2012	Bergen Philharmonic, Rotterdam Philharmonic (Elgar: Enigma Variations)
2012	Piano Colours recital tour with Pierre-Laurent Aimard: Aldeburgh Festival, Helsinki Festival, Yellow Lounge Amsterdam, Salzburg Dialoge Festival
2013	Recording for HQ Creative, Dubai
2013	National Orchestra of Belgium, Brussels (Scriabin: Prometheus, Poem of Fire)
2014	Festival O/MODERNT, Stockholm (Stravinsky: L'Histoire du Soldat)
2015	Nightfall with the Ebonit Saxophone Quartet, NJO Muziekzomer
2016	Musik und Malerei with Daniel Hope and Sebastian Knauer: Konzerthaus Berlin, Schleswig-Holstein Music Festival
2016	UN-WIPO Conference, Geneva (Stravinsky: L'Histoire du Soldat)
2016	Seoul, Sejong Soloists (Augusta Read Thomas: Murmurs in the Mist of Memory)
2016	Nightfall with the Ebonit Saxophone Quartet, Amsterdam
