= Hipkiss =

Hipkiss is a surname. Notable people with the surname include:

- Hipkiss (artist) (born 1964), British artist duo, formerly known as 'Chris Hipkiss'
- Dan Hipkiss (born 1982), English rugby union player
- Ted Hipkiss (1947–2025), New Zealand cricketer
