= Ada Hill Walker =

British artist (1879–1955)

- Born: 1879
- Died: 10 November 1955 (aged 75–76); St Andrews, Fife, Scotland
- Known for: Scientific illustrator

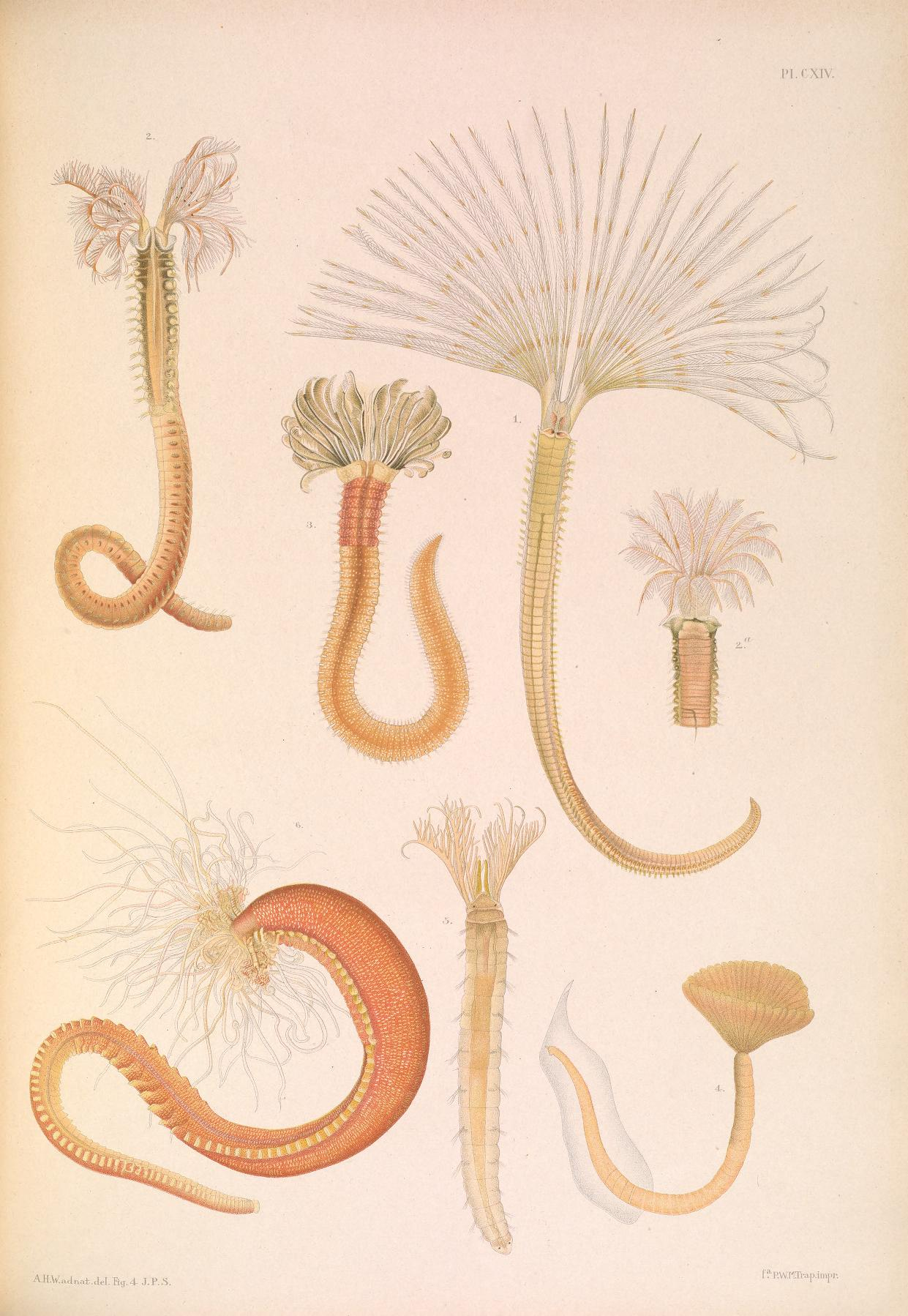
Illustration of Polychaetes (marine worms) illustrated by Ada Hill Walker in A Monograph of the British Marine Annelids by William M'Intosh

Ada Hill Walker (1879 – 10 November 1955) was a British scientific illustrator, artist and flower painter based in St Andrews in Scotland who provided illustrations for the scientific publications of William M'Intosh (1838–1931). She often signed her work as A.H.W., A.H. Walker and Ada H. Walker.

== Early life and education ==
Ada Hill Walker was born in 1879, the daughter of Jessie (née Hill) and James Walker. Her older brother was the architect William Hill Walker (1875–c.1955). Walker trained at Glasgow School of Art, but returned to work in her home town after graduating.

== Career ==
Walker became an art teacher in St Andrews. She co-authored A System of Brush Drawing and Design for Public Elementary Schools with R. Smeaton Douglas. The book on brush-drawing was published in 1902 and Walker provided 15 illustrative plates. Walker's preferred media was watercolours, but she worked with other materials as well. The areas in and around St Andrews were her main source of inspiration.

Walker provided the illustrations for A Monograph of the British Marine Annelids by William M'Intosh.

In the 1930s she was commissioned to paint murals in the New Picture House in her native St Andrews.

Ada Hill Walker lived in St Andrews in Scotland all her life and died there in 1955.

== Collections ==
- The New Picture House Cinema in St Andrews houses a selection of murals by Walker commissioned for the space in the 1930s.
- St Andrews Heritage Museum and Garden.
- University of St Andrews.

== Gallery ==
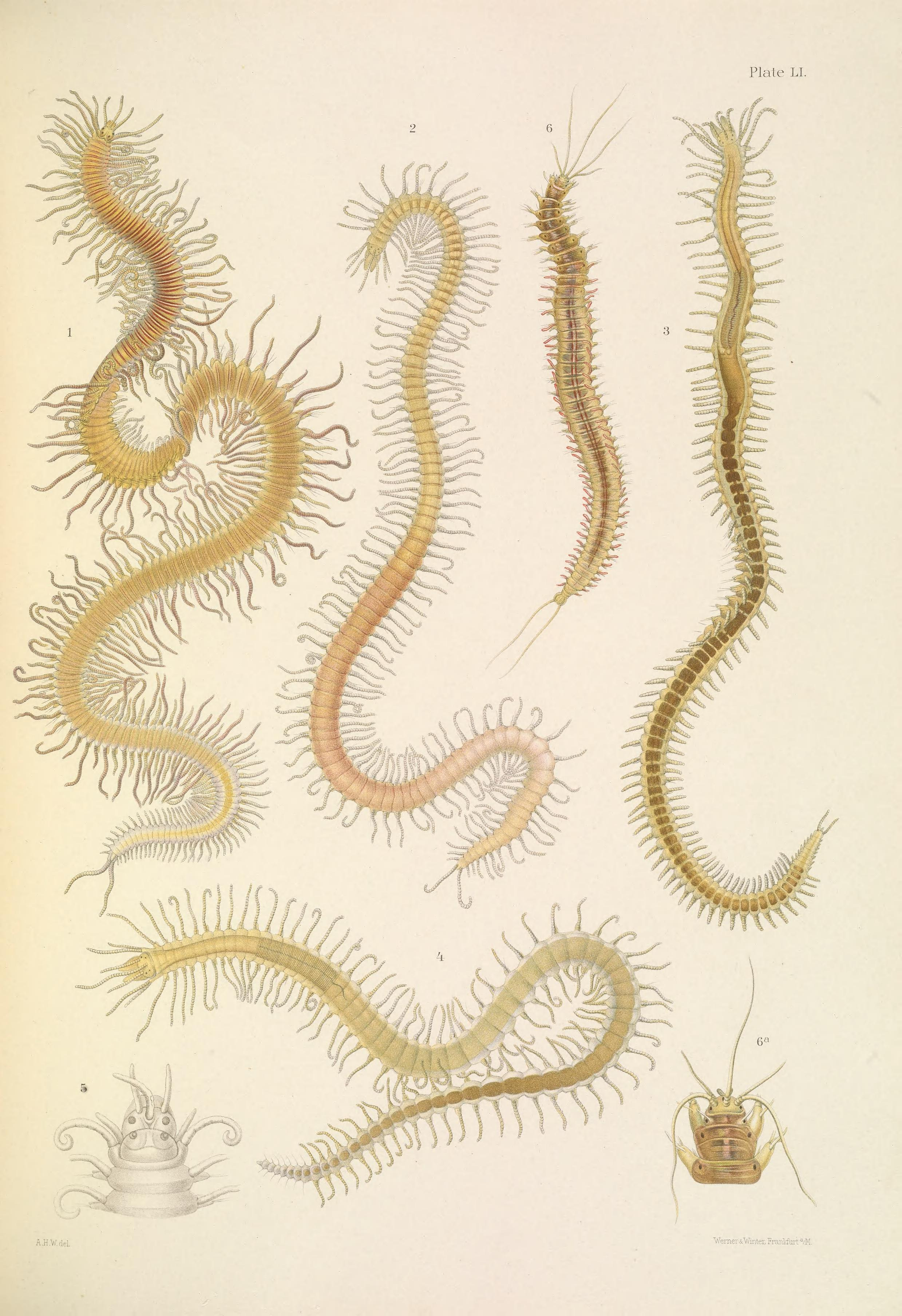
A monograph of the British marine annelids 1910

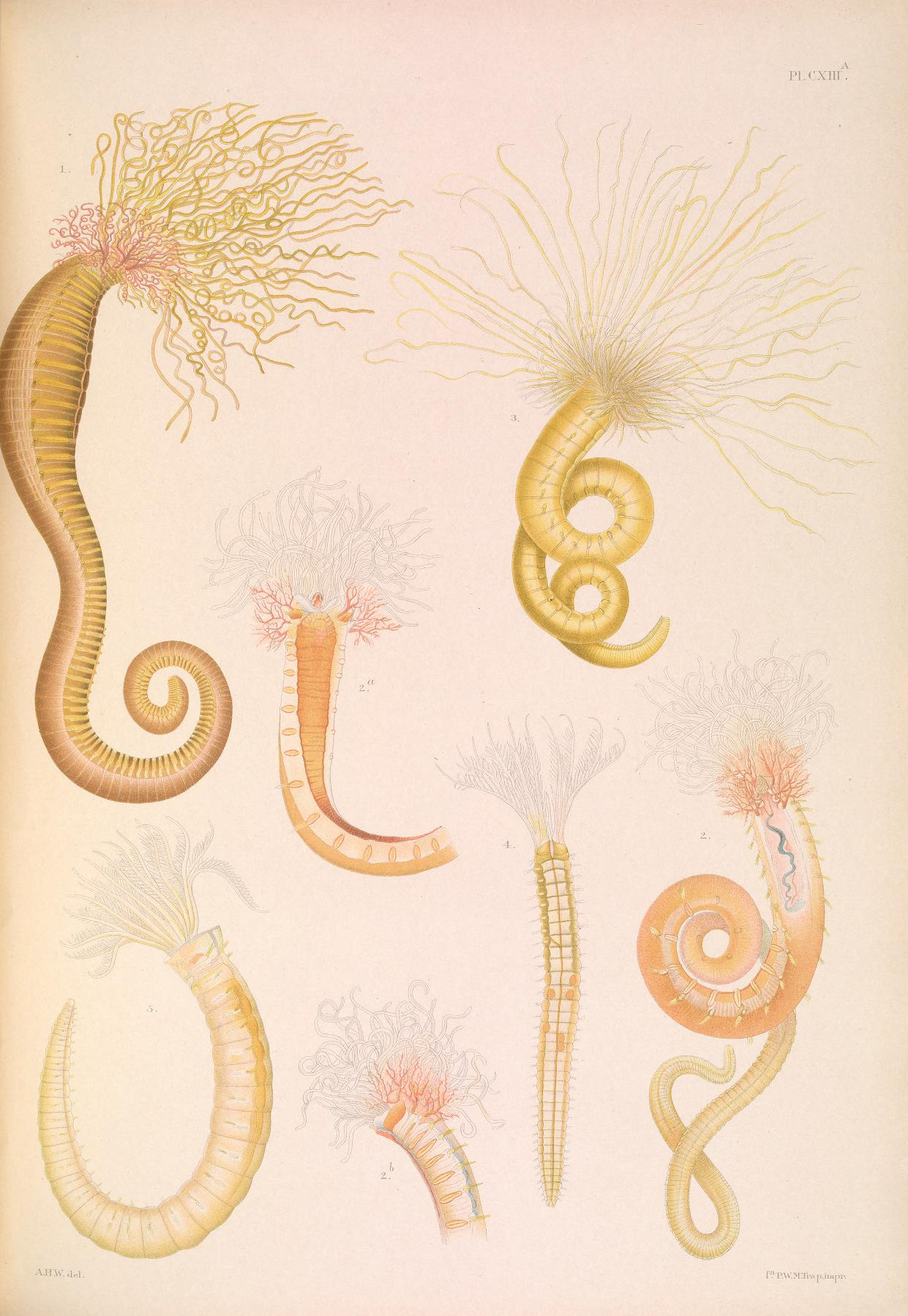
A monograph of the British marine annelids 1922 CXIIIA

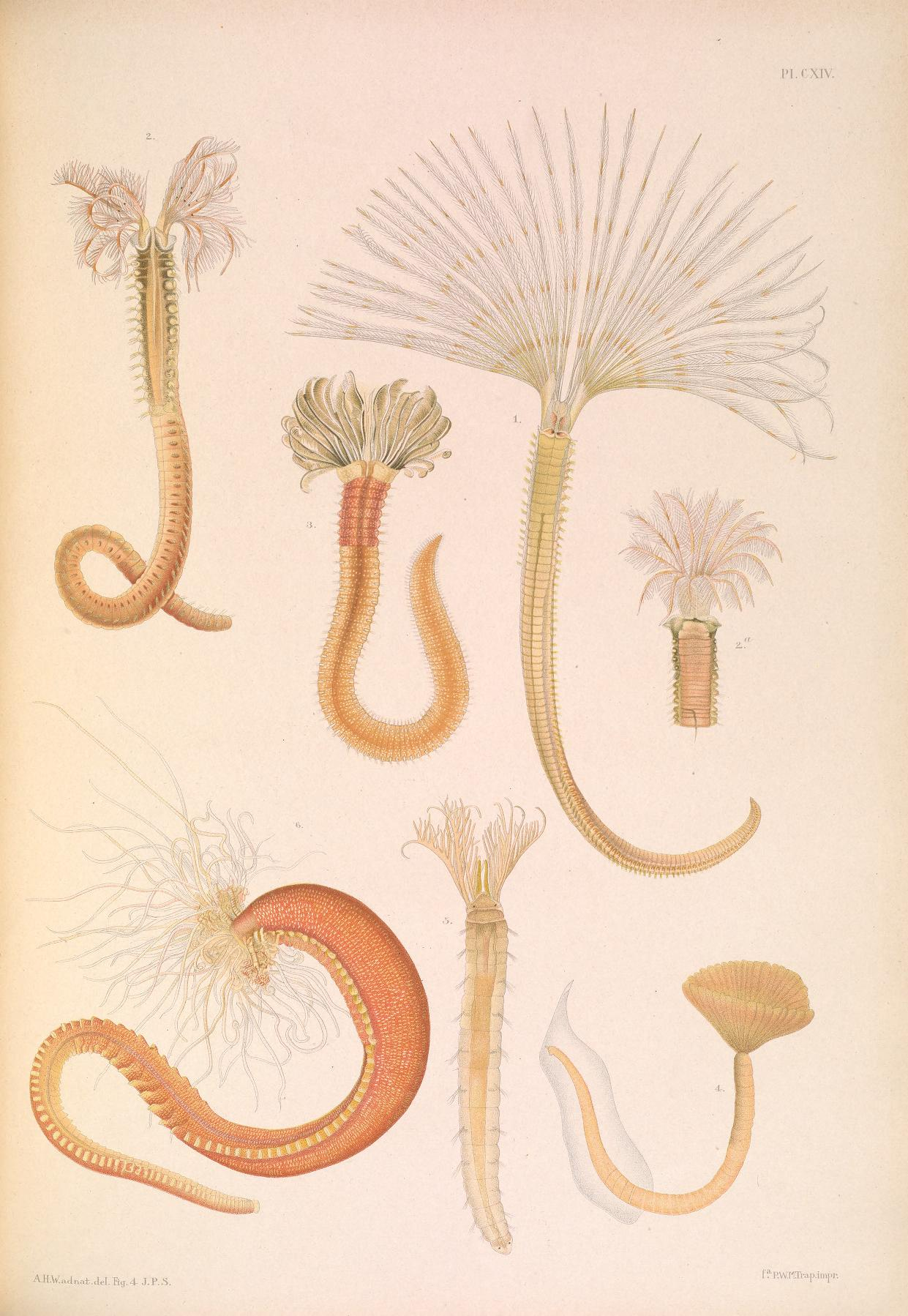
A monograph of the British marine annelids 1922 Plate CXIV

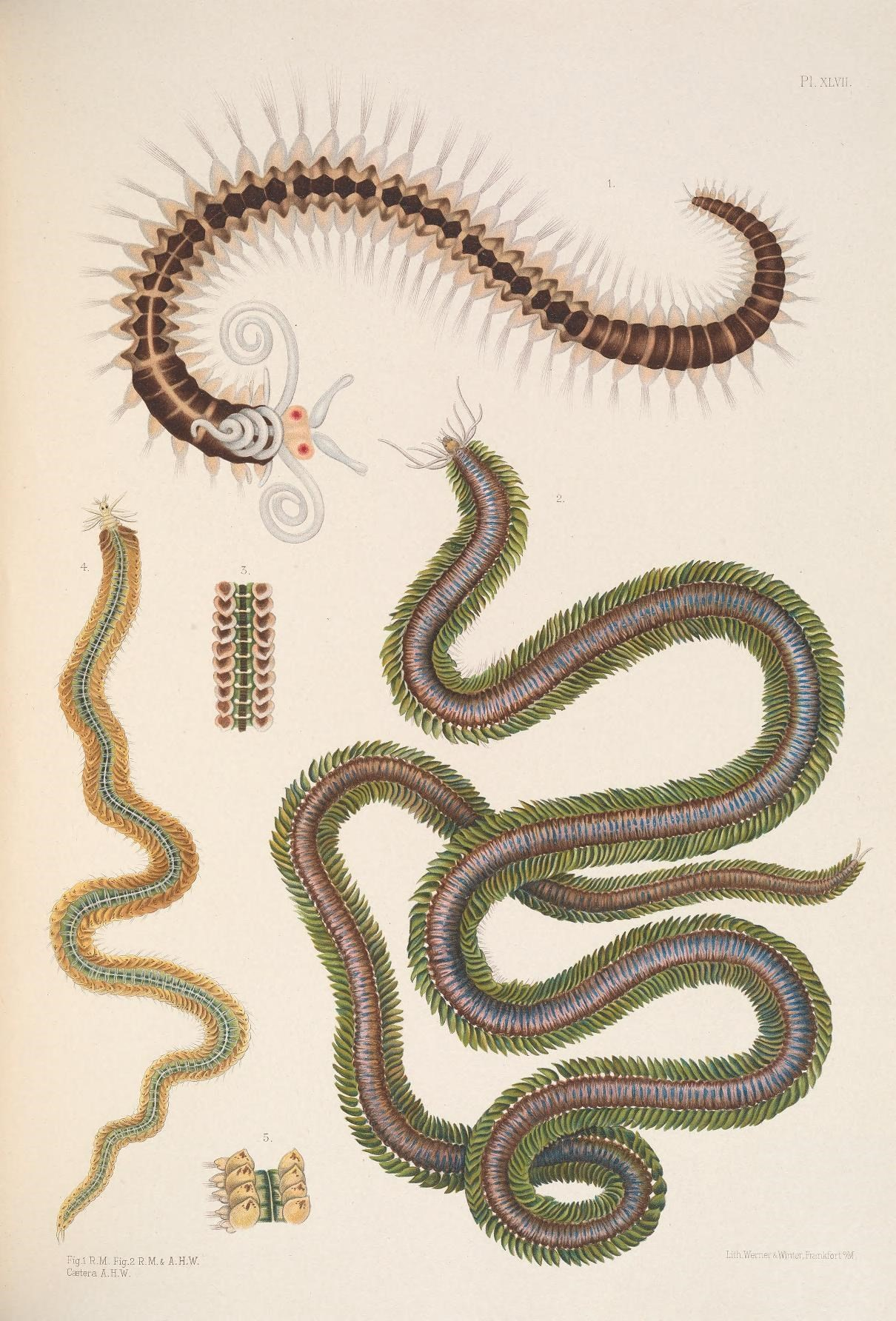
