= Nicola Bealing =

British artist

Nicola Bealing (born 1963) is a Cornwall-based British painter.

== Education ==
Bealing was born in Hertford and educated in England. She completed the foundation course in art at Herts College of Art and Design in St Albans in 1983 and began the diploma course in Fine Art at the Byam Shaw School of Art in London in 1984. In 1988 she relocated to Cornwall. Cornwall Artists Index describes Bealing’s “wit and skill … [as employing] the unexpected and unusual in her figurative and abstract work."

== Career ==
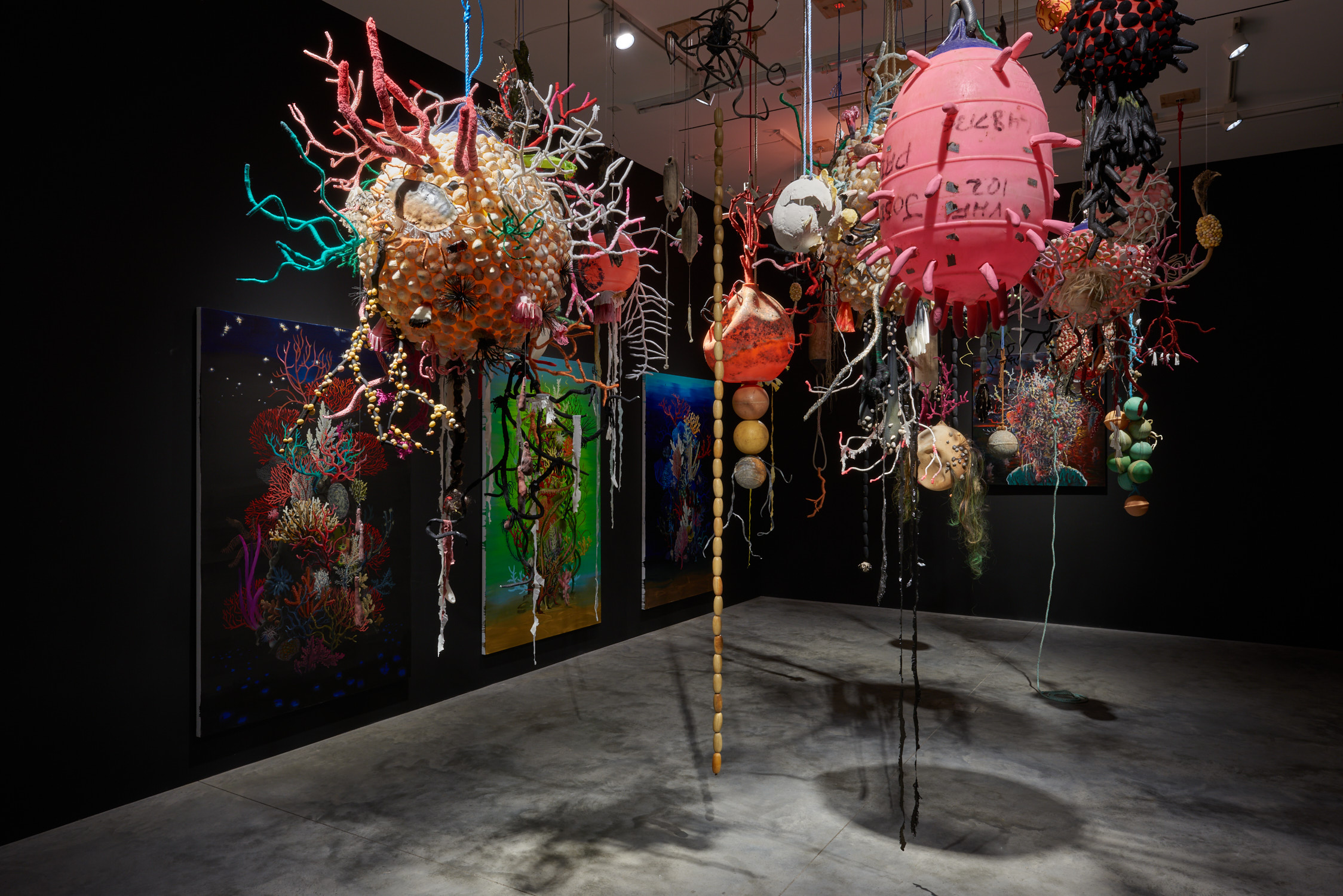
Nicola Bealing's Chapter 1: Dead-man’s Fingers at Matt's Gallery, 2023. Photograph: Jonathan Bassett

Bealing has participated in a large number of group shows. At the 1992 South-West Open Exhibition, held at the Plymouth Arts Centre and at Plymouth City Museum & Art Gallery, Bealing won first prize. In 1995 she was awarded First Prize at the Millfield School Open Exhibition. Bealing's work was among the artworks exhibited for the John Moores Painting Prize at the Walker Art Gallery, Liverpool in 2021 and as part of the Royal Academy Summer Exhibition in 2022.

Bealing solo exhibited at Christie's Education, London in 1991 and Plymouth Arts Centre in 1993. Bealing has also exhibited at Wagner and Schortgen Fine Art, Luxembourg in 1998 and at Danneskiold-Samsøe Gallery, Copenhagen in 2013. She has works in the permanent collections of the British Museum, the Foundling Museum and the Jerwood Contemporary Collection.

Bealing is represented by Matt’s Gallery where she has exhibited on several occasions, including her two-part exhibition Dead-man’s Fingers and The Borough, which ran from February to April 2023.

In 2021 Bealing was awarded the Bryan Robertson Trust Award, selected by a panel that included Phyllida Barlow and Alison Wilding. In April 2023 Bealing was awarded a Royal Cornwall Polytechnic Society Medal Award for ‘an extraordinary body of work produced in response to the pandemic’.
