= Victoria Monkhouse =

British artist (1883-1970)

- Born: 1883
- Died: 1970 (aged 86–87)
- Education: Cambridge University
- Known for: Painting, caricatures

Victoria Monkhouse (1883–1970) was a British artist and illustrator, notable for her depictions of women working on the British Home Front during the First World War.

== Biography ==
Monkhouse attended Cambridge University and, alongside her studies, she created a series of caricatures of university academics which the Cambridge University Magazine published during 1907.

Following the establishment of the Imperial War Museum, IWM, during the First World War, a decision was made to record the contribution women were making to the war effort. Agnes Conway, the daughter of the honorary director-general of the IWM, was appointed to chair the Museum's new Women's Work Sub-Committee. Conway appears to have known of Monkhouse's academic caricatures from her own time at Cambridge University. Through a mutual acquaintance, Conway contacted Monkhouse and commissioned her, in May 1918, to produce a series of sketches and watercolours showing women working in jobs left vacant by men who were serving in the forces. Monkhouse produced a series showing women working as bus conductors, drivers, window cleaners and in other previously exclusively male roles.

After the War, Monkhouse exhibited in some group shows in the early 1920s but does not appear to have pursued a professional artistic career beyond that. The IWM regularly features Monkhouse's work in their exhibitions to favourable reviews.
