= Emily Powell =

British painter (born 1990)

Emily Powell (born 1990) is a British painter from Liverpool, noted for her "vibrant and colourful canvases". Her works include a series of paintings in which she depicts various politicians as floral arrangements, with colours inspired by her synaesthesia, and floor-to-ceiling paintings recreating her experience of an expedition in the Norwegian Arctic. In 2025, Powell gained attention for transforming her family home into a hand-painted artwork titled The Art of Living.

== Life and career ==
Emily Powell was born in Liverpool in 1990. She trained at Norwich School of Art and now lives in Brixham.

Powell has explained that she finds winters difficult due to post-traumatic stress disorder caused by the loss of her father in October 1997, when she was aged seven. In what the BBC described as a bid to fend off the "winter darkness", Powell undertook a project to recreate her experience of an expedition in the Norwegian Arctic in the form of floor-to-ceiling paintings in her studio, an 18th-century barn on Dartmoor. They were exhibited in a 2024 show called Arktisk.

Powell has synaesthesia, which she used in her series of paintings The Greenhouse of Commons. In the series she depicts various politicians as floral arrangements, with colours based on the emotions they inspire in her. It includes depictions of Margaret Thatcher and Angela Rayner, and Prime Minister Keir Starmer as a plant in a "sensible pot". The series was featured as part of Powell's show Paintings on Prescription at Portland Gallery in 2025.

Later in 2025, Powell held a series of open-house tours of her family's home which she had hand-painted throughout, turning it into an artwork called The Art of Living. It was put up for sale at a price of £2 million. The interior painting includes fishing boats along hallway skirting boards, a circus-themed playroom with animals wearing party hats, and a cupboard depicted as a swimming pool. Included in the sale were also 65 works Powell has produced over the past ten years, along with 20 items of painted furniture.

Powell has lectured at the Royal Academy of Arts and Sotheby's Institute of Art. The BBC has described her as being known for her "vibrant and colourful canvases".
