= Geoffrey Humphries =

English painter

Geoffrey Humphries (born Amersham, 1945) is an English artist.

Humphries attended the High Wycombe School of Art, the London College of Printing, and the Chelsea College of Art and Design.

In 1963 he visited Italy for the first time, and took his degree from the Accademia di Belle Arti in Venice, where he received his highest honours in 1974. After then studying in Rome and Florence, he moved to Venice in 1966, where he still lives and works. His studio overlooking the Giudecca Canal is a well-known centre for music and the arts, where he runs courses on painting and life drawing. He is also an accomplished blues guitarist, and spends part of every year painting and exhibiting in the Deep South of the United States - New Orleans, Charleston, and Savannah.

== Work ==
He works principally from the figure, painting and drawing the model from life, and in recent years has turned his attention to portraying some of the lesser-known corners of his adopted city, Venice. He does extensive portrait commissions, and recent works have been shown at the National Portrait Gallery and the Royal Portrait Society in London. He is a Guest Lecturer at the Royal College of Art, and his works are found in public and private collections throughout Europe and North America.

His sense of colour and composition shares common ground with the work of:

- John Singer Sargent and
- James McNeill Whistler

His drawings reveal the influence of:

- Egon Schiele,
- Gustav Klimt, and
- Félicien Rops.

His larger, more complex expressionist work on the themes of cabaret and Venetian myth display a debt to the German decadent tradition of Lyonel Feininger, George Grosz, and Otto Dix.
