= Eden Box =

English painter (1919–1988)

- Born: 1919; London, England
- Died: 1988 (aged 68–69)
- Education: Regent Street Polytechnic
- Known for: Painting
- Spouse: Marston Fleming

Eden Box (1919 – 1988) or E.Box or Edna Box, was a British artist who painted religious scenes often in a highly stylised, naive manner.

== Biography ==
Box was born in London and studied at the Regent Street Polytechnic in central London between 1936 and 1939. She had a close friendship with the British writer and traveller, Lesley Blanch. After graduation she married professor Marston Fleming, a senior research fellow at Imperial College, London, and accompanied him on his overseas research trips. These trips to North America, Asia, Africa and Russia provided Box with subjects for her paintings. She painted richly coloured animals and figures in a highly stylised manner and often with a Christian theme. The Expulsion (1951), now in the Tate, shows animals in the Garden of Eden with two small human figures under a flaming sword flanked by angels. Box also used literature as a source and referenced works by Alexander Pushkin, William Morris, Andrew Marvell and William Blake in her paintings. Box's style was described as "strange" and her artwork as "unique" in The China Mail (1958).

In 1964, Box took part in the exhibition The World of the Innocents held at the Musée National d'Art Moderne in Paris. A 1981 retrospective exhibition of her work at the David Carritt gallery had a catalogue featuring an introduction written by Howard Hodgkin, who was a great admirer of her work. Other retrospectives were held in 1956 and 1979 at galleries in King's Lynn. Roy Strong also championed her work in a 1978 article for Vogue. Box's first solo exhibition was held in 1949 at the Hanover Gallery in London and in all she had fifteen solo exhibitions, including one in Rome and two in New York at the Betty Parsons Gallery in 1953 and 1958, during her career.
