= Emma Cousin =

British artist

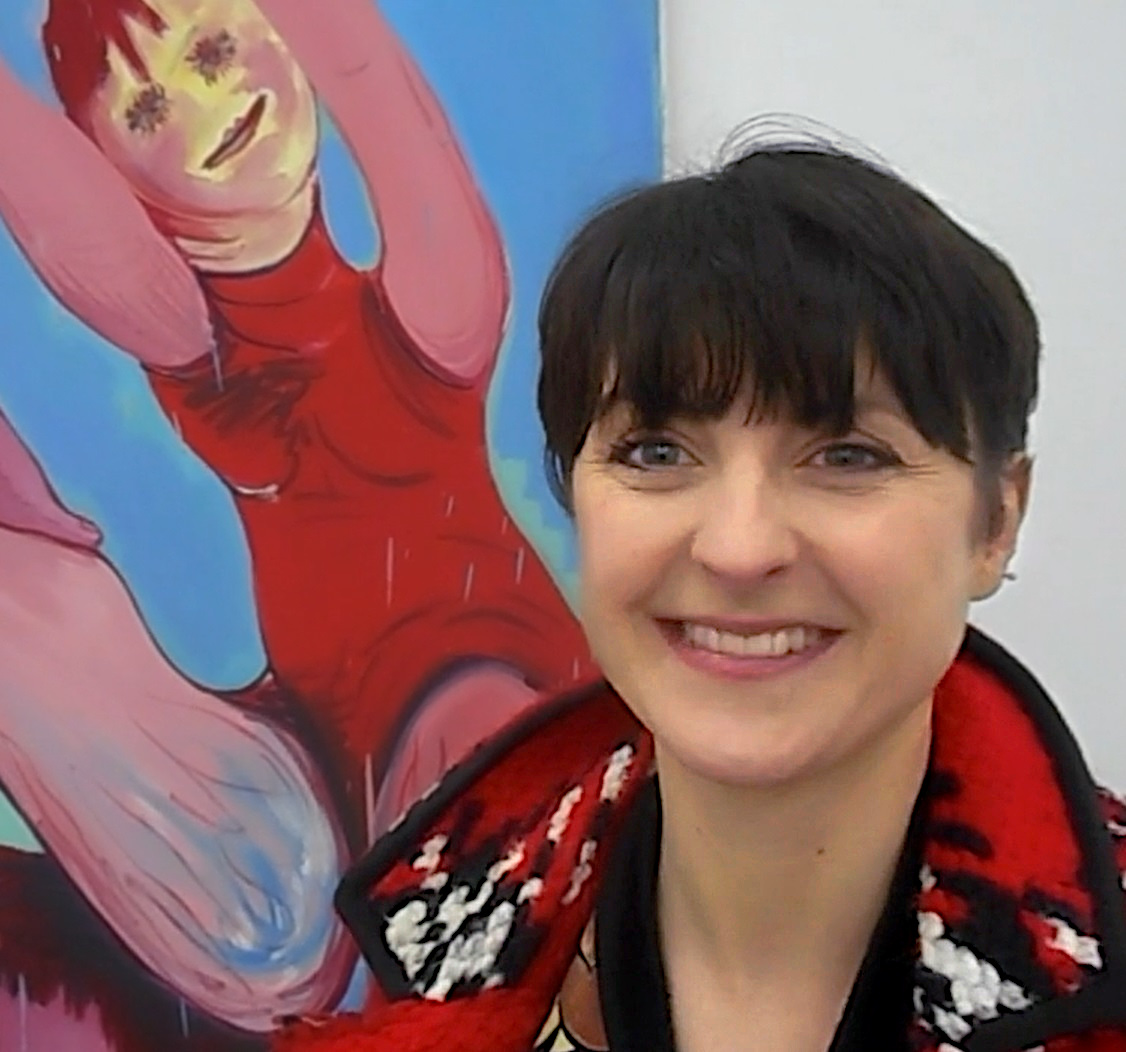
- Emma Cousin at the Art House in 2018
- Born: 1986 (age 39–40); Yorkshire, England
- Education: Ruskin School of Art
- Known for: Painting

Emma Cousin (born 8 March 1986 in Yorkshire) is a British artist.

== Life ==
Cousin grew up in Yorkshire. In 2007, she graduated from the Ruskin School of Fine Art at the University of Oxford. Cousin currently resides in Peckham, and works in London.

A mixture of geometric and figurative elements in a bold colour palette is typical of Cousin's style, her paintings often feature depictions of limbs. Her works are regularly on display in different galleries, such as in Transition Gallery, and in the House of St Barnabas in London. Her paintings have been shown in various group exhibitions but also in solo shows, the most recent one being Leg Up at Lewisham Arthouse in London. In addition to making art, Cousin teaches at various institutions, including Milton Keynes Arts Centre and Sotheby's Institute of Art, London.

The highest price paid at auction for one of her paintings was $25,897 USD for PythonIcing, sold at Phillips London in 2023.

== Exhibitions (selection) ==
- 2018: Leg Up at Lewisham Art House.
- 2015: Lucy in the Sky, group show, Transition Gallery, London.
- 2015: Seven Painters, group show, Arcade Gallery, Cardiff and London.
- 2016: The ING Discerning Eye Exhibition, group show, Mall Galleries, London.
- 2017: Make a Mark, group show, Arthouse1 Gallery, London.
- 2017: I Really Miss You Until You’re Here, group show, White Conduit Projects, London.
- 2017: Silk Room, group show, The House of St Barnabas, London.
- 2017: Mudhook, Tintype Gallery, London.
- 2017: Aids to Living, solo show, DOLPH Projects, London.
- 2017: Painting Vol.1, group show, CGK Gallery, Copenhagen.
- 2018: Survey, touring show, Jerwood Visual Arts, London, Cardiff, Liverpool and Newcastle.
- 2018: Mardy, group show, Edel Assanti, London.
- 2018: Leg Up, solo show, Lewisham Arthouse, London.
- 2018: Wasp, group show, Hannah Barry Gallery, London.

== Exhibitions as curator ==
- 2014: The British Line, group show, Robin Katz Gallery, London
- 2016: Its Offal, ArtHouse1, London.
- 2015—2017: Bread and Jam, a series of 7 exhibitions, London.

== Awards (selection) ==
- 2016: Marmite Painting Prize
- 2018: Jerwood Visual Arts Survey award
