= Cosmo Armstrong =

English line-engraver

Cosmo Armstrong (fl. 1771–1847), was an English line-engraver.

He was the son of John Armstrong and apprenticed to John Gyde, citizen and loriner 6 June 1787. Armstrong was a pupil of Thomas Milton, the landscape-engraver. He was a governor of the Society of Engravers, and he exhibited with the Associated Engravers in 1821. He engraved some plates for Cooke's edition of the British Poets, Sharpe's edition of the British Classics, Kearsley's edition of Shakespeare, Suttaby's edition of the British Classics, Allason's Picturesque Views of the Antiquities of Pola, 1819, and the Ancient Marbles in the British Museum.

Among his other works may be noticed Camaralzaman and Badoura and The Sleeper awakened, after Robert Smirke, for Miller's edition of the Arabian Nights, published in 1802; Don Quixote's Combat with the Giant Malumbruno, also after Smirke, for Cadell's edition of Don Quixote, issued in 1818; and small portraits of Michelangelo, Shakespeare, Charles I., after Van Dyck, Lord Byron, after Thomas Phillips, and George IV, after Sir Thomas Lawrence. He was buried at St Pancras 16 November 1847 aged 76.
