= Monica Petzal =

British artist

Monica Nicole Sophie Petzal
- Born: 22 June 1953 (age 73); London, England
- Known for: Painting and printmaking
- Website: https://monicapetzal.com/

Monica Petzal (born 22 June 1953) is a British artist, known primarily as a painter and printmaker.

Petzal was born in London, the daughter of German Jewish refugees.

Petzal's recent work concerns her family's displacement from Germany under the Nazi regime and the broader themes of dissent, displacement and destruction in the twentieth century and beyond.

== Career ==
In the 1980s, Petzal worked as a journalist and arts critic for Time Out and Art Monthly.

In 1994, she and Belinda Harding developed a plan to establish a Museum of Women's Art (MWA) in London. The plan was not implemented, though an inaugural exhibition, Reclaiming the Madonna, was held at the Economist Building that year.

From 2000 to 2007, she was an interviewer for the British Library and Tate Gallery Archive's Artists' Lives oral history project and was considered a catalyst for the 'Art Professionals' portion, recording life story interviews with curators, critics, dealers and gallery owners.

== Selected solo exhibitions ==
Her one-person exhibitions include:

- 2015 The Dresden Project - Indelible Marks, Kreuzkirche, Dresden and Herbert Art Gallery and Museum
- 2015 75/70 The Coventry Dresden Towers, Coventry Cathedral
- 2020 Dissent and Displacement: A Modern Story, Leicester Museum & Art Gallery

== Selected group exhibitions ==
- 2010 Originals 10, at the Mall Galleries
- 2012 Process and Innovation, British Printmaking Japan, at the Kyoto Municipal Museum of Art (co-curator with Rebecca Salter)
- 2015 Printmakers Council, at the Bankside Gallery
- 2016 To a death in sweating wakefulness, Pie Factory Margate
- 2018 Reconciliations, The Exchange, Bush House, King's College London and The Knapp Gallery, Regent's University London
- 2020 9th International Printmaking Biennial, Douro, Portugal

== Selected public collections ==
- Diocese, Dresden
- Herbert Art Gallery and Museum
- Royal College of Art, London
- Victoria & Albert Museum, London
- The Women's Art Collection, Murray Edwards College, Cambridge
