= Margot Perryman =

Margot Perryman (born 1938) is a British educator and abstract artist. Her works are held in the collections of the Tate Gallery and the UK Government. She taught at institutions including Goldsmith College and Ravensbourne College in London, and at Winchester College of Art.

== Biography ==
Perryman was born in 1938 in Plymouth, Devon. She studied at the Harrow School of Art (1953–1956), which is now part of the University of Westminster. She then specialised in painting at the Slade School of Fine Art in London (1956–1959).

After graduating, Perryman exhibited at John Moore's Liverpool Exhibition in 1965. She taught at the United States School in London then lived and worked in New York from 1965–1966. After returning to England she taught at Goldsmith College (now Goldsmiths University) and Ravensbourne College in London, and at Winchester College of Art.

Perryman's earliest works were earlier works were of ragged flat-colour shapes and she also had an interest in mathematical drawings. In 1970, Perryman's acrylic paintings were exhibited at in a group exhibition at the Richard Demarco Gallery in Edinburgh, Scotland. Her 1969 painting Arcade was purchased directly from the exhibition and is held in the permanent collection of the Tate Gallery.

Perryman's work Untitled No.76 is held in the UK Government's art collection. Other works by Perryman are held by the Leicestershire Education Committee, The Fitzwilliam Museum and the Arts Council Collection at the Southbank Centre.
