= Terry Smith (artist) =

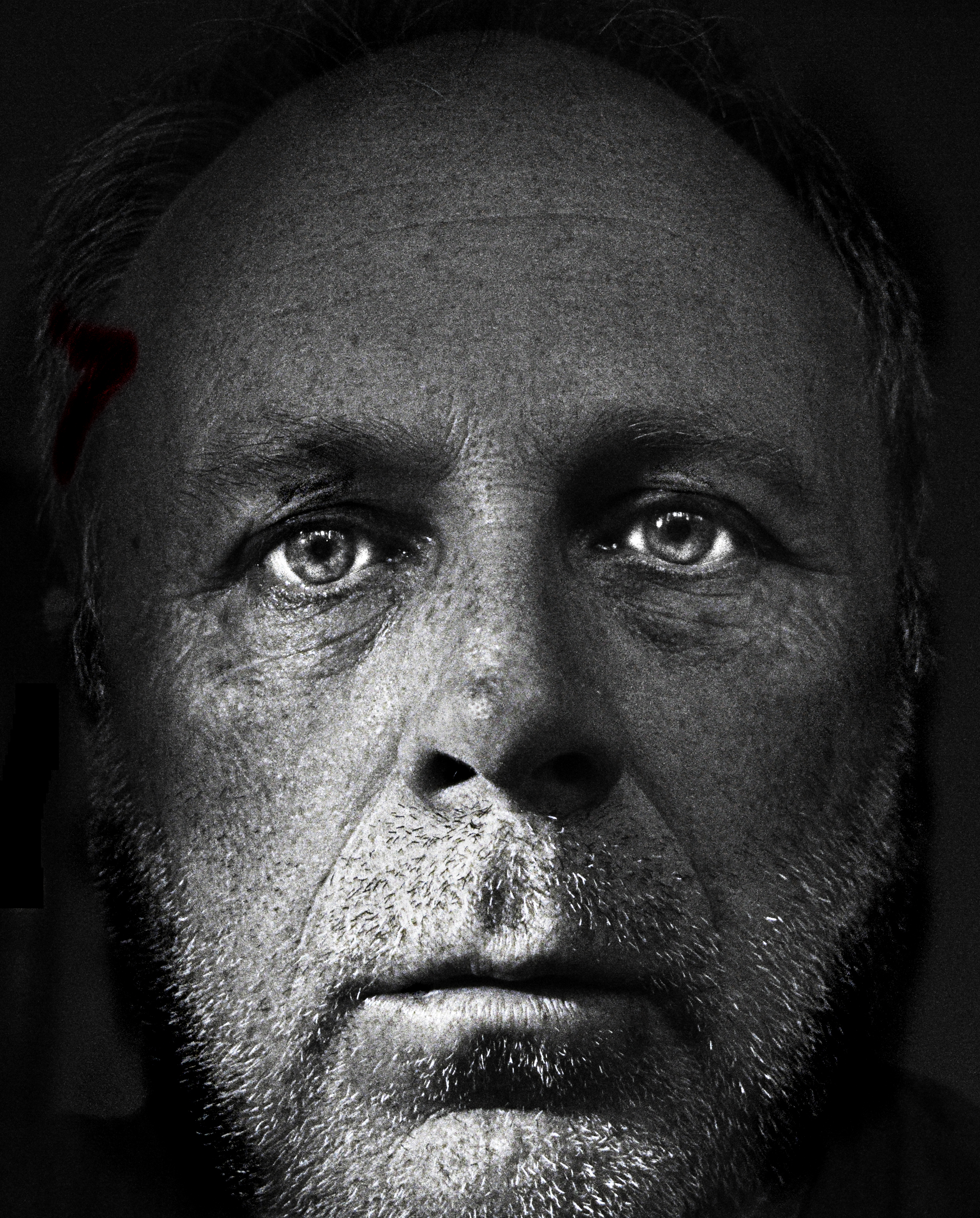

Terry Smith (born 1956) is a British-born artist living in London, England. In 2008, Smith was a recipient of the Paul Hamlyn Foundation Award for Artists. He is known for his carvings into the plaster of walls, mainly in derelict buildings and spaces.

== Works ==
Smith notably held the keys to Tate Turbine Hall during the building of the hall in 1995–6, having been given permission to create his sculptures in the walls and spaces of the hall. Only the staff at the Tate and a few invitees were permitted access to the works areas inside the Turbine Hall and other areas of the building site to see Smith's work. Images of these works at Tate Modern were later shown at the South London Gallery in July–August 1996 for a group show called "Inside Bankside". Smith was permitted to create the same plaster/wall-based sculptures at the British Museum and also, prior to the British Museum piece, in the building that later became the South London Gallery. Smith had his first major retrospective Parallax. at the John Hansard Gallery, Southampton from December 2011–January 2012.

Other works of note were The Foundling, a video-audio installation commissioned by Gill Hedley as part of the Foundling Museum's contemporary art programme.

Smith has exhibited extensively in the UK and South America (e.g. Instituto de Artes, Porte Alegre, Brazil, Museo de Bellas Artes de Caracas, Caracas, Venezuela and Museo X-Tersea, Mexico City.).

Solo Exhibitions include Fault Line, Museo de Arte Contemporaneo, Mexico City (1999), Marking Time, Lux Gallery, London (2000) and One thing leads to another, Studio 1.1, London (2004).

Publications include: 2000 Marking time. Nuova Icona, Venice. ISBN 8887632006 2008 The Art of Learning. Art Monthly October 8 issue

One of Terry Smith's audio pieces Untitled features on the album Root by Thurston Moore, released on Lo Recordings in 1998.

== Awards ==
1997, Pollock-Krasner Foundation 1997 London Arts Board 1997 Arts Council of England
