= The Connor Brothers =

Fictional art duo

The Connor Brothers are the pseudonym of artists and former London art gallery owners, Mike Snelle and James Golding. The name was initially created to represent a fictional American artist duo, Franklin and Brendan Connor.

== Background ==
The Connor Brothers were launched onto the art world in early 2013. A series of limited edition prints, based on refashioned book covers, appeared at a London art fair and sold out. The Connor Brothers were given a back story, that they were American brothers who had grown up in isolation, escaped from a cult in their teens, now in their 20s living in Brooklyn where they had been creating art as a form of therapy for their trauma.

Later in 2014 two British former gallery owners confessed they were behind The Connor Brothers. Mike Snelle and James Golding had begun to explore the idea of using fake biographies at an exhibition in 2012 and Snelle had subsequently created the back story of The Connor Brothers, to mirror his and Golding's experience of mental health problems and drug addiction.

Golding and Snelle employed an artist to create The Connor Brothers' paintings.

=== Biographies ===
Snelle was born in Liverpool though his family had moved 13 times by the time he was 15. He graduated from Cambridge University in 2002 with a philosophy degree. He met Golding in Cambridge. Snelle initially worked sourcing artworks for art dealers. He moved to London and began selling limited edition prints by urban artists. In 2007 he opened a gallery in Shoreditch, Black Rat Projects. Black Rat closed in 2012 because of problems Snelle was experiencing with his mental health.

Golding went to a fee-paying school, before working in London as a city trader. He fell into a heroin addiction and into trouble with the police. After recovering from the habit in 2002, he began selling art from a premises in Shoreditch. In 2011 he opened a new gallery in Soho. In 2012, Golding contacted Snelle, encouraging him to seek help for his health issues. They subsequently decided to live together.

== Art ==
The artworks (and the creation of The Connor Brothers) set out to explore the boundaries between truth and fiction and make sense of the world. This often manifests itself in the recreation and reimagining of 1950s posters and vintage paperback book covers, but also more generally in the form of silkscreen prints and paintings.

A Mills & Boon themed artwork sold at Christie's auction house in September 2013 for £5,250. An acrylic painting, "Thrilling News", on a similar theme sold at Bonhams in March 2014 above estimate for £9,375.

In November 2015 The Connor Brothers collaborated with activist and Pussy Riot musician, Nadya Tolokonnikova, to recreate part of a Calais refugee camp in the Hang-Up Gallery in Stoke Newington. The Connor Brothers, having sold a limited edition print to raise money to provide tents for refugees, had visited the Calais Jungle with Pussy Riot.

In September 2021 the duo collaborated with The Big Issue to create a special art edition of the magazine. They auctioned a limited edition print to raise money for the cause.

== Other interests ==
In 2020 The Connor Brothers bought a dinosaur skeleton for $300,000 at an art and gem fair in Quartzsite, Arizona from an old hippie in a converted bus painted with many bright colors. The skeleton disappeared before it could reach them. They spent months travelling internationally to try and track it down. They subsequently built up a trade in fossils and meteorites.

== Exhibitions ==
- All This happened, More or Less, Level 1, 66 King Street, Sydney, May 2015
- So It Goes..., Hang-Up Gallery, London, November–December 2015
- Saints + Sinners, Cat Street Gallery, Hong Kong, November–December 2016
- All My Life I've Been A Liar And That's The Truth, Nanda\Hobbs Contemporary, Sydney, June 2017
- A Load Of Fuss About Fuck All, Maddox Gallery, London, October-November 2021
- Some Of My Best Friends Are Dinosaurs, Extraordinary Objects Gallery, Cambridge, August–October 2022
- Truth or Dare?, Clarendon Fine Art, Mayfair, June 2023
- Once Were Kings, Maddox Gallery, London, October–November 2023
- Ride or Die, Maddox Gallery, London, March–May 2025
