= Estella Campavias =

British sculptor and ceramicist

- Campavias as photographed by Ida Kar, 1958
- Born: 1918; Istanbul
- Died: 1990 (aged 71–72)
- Known for: Ceramics

Estella Campavias (1918–1990) was a British sculptor and ceramicist. She is known for glazed stoneware, as on display in the Victoria and Albert Museum.

== Early life ==
Born in Istanbul, Campavias was of Scottish and Spanish extraction. She was brought up in Turkey, and travelled as the daughter of a diplomat. Self-taught, Campavias first gained fame as a ceramicist, beginning her career in 1955, before developing as a sculptor in the 1970s.

== Works ==
Her abstract sculptures take the form of smooth flowing figures, seemingly in movement. Her sculptures were exhibited in Italy, France and the United Kingdom. Some of her pieces: Head (c.1980), Reclining Figure (c.1980) and La Joie de Vivre (1988) were featured, for sale, in the Wolseley Fine Arts Catalogue of Modern and Contemporary Sculpture. In 2013, some of her previously unseen works were exhibited at the Glyndebourne Festival alongside the work of Sean Henry and Michael Craig-Martin. She was described by Roy Oppenheim as "one of the most exciting sculptors of our time". An image of Campavias, taken by Ida Kar is held in the collection of the National Portrait Gallery.
