= Mandy Wilkinson =

British painter (born 1970)

Mandy Wilkinson (born 1970, Manchester) is a British painter.

She graduated from Cumbria College of Art and Design with a first class degree in 1994. Predominantly an abstract painter whose individual paintings cross the boundaries between the two-dimensional and the three-dimensional, gestural painterliness and flat monochrome blocks of colour.

In August 2009 her dealer, David Godfrey, claimed she was the most copied living artist. Both Wilkinson and Godfrey, the curator of Central London's Gallery 94, said mass production art studios in China had made her a favourite and reproduced countless numbers of her works which had returned to the market as 'originals'. Wilkinson sells her paintings for £2,000 to £6,000 while the Chinese copies were selling for £45.

Wilkinson lives in near Llangollen, North Wales.
