= Thomas Hodges (artist) =

British artist

- Born: 3 April 1957 (age 69); London, England, United Kingdom
- Occupation: Artist

Thomas Hodges (born 3 April 1957) is a modern-day British artist, working primarily with photography, and is best known for his nude-art work.

== Life ==
Hodges was born in the South London suburb of Woolwich. His father was an amateur photographer and he developed an early interest in photography. Hodges has travelled throughout Europe, spending many years living in France and moving to Italy in 2007, where he currently resides. He has also lived throughout East and Southeast Asia, residing in Malaysia, Hong Kong and China.

== Legal Action ==
In 2014, the popular Taiwanese online news outlet, Apple Daily (now NextApple), reported on a court case involving Hodges and his wife, who faced allegations of selling nude photos of a woman without her consent. They assert that the Taiwan Shilin District Court ruled in favour of the woman, mandating Hodges and his wife to pay NT$200,000 in damages and remove all the photos of the woman from public access and cease sales of said photographs.

Subsequent to the court's verdict, Hodges was quoted by Apple Daily as stating, "I'm not a Taiwanese citizen, and I don't care about Taiwan's **** law." It remains unclear whether they complied with the court's directive, as Apple Daily reported that Hodges continued exhibiting and expressing willingness to sell the photos to them even after the court's ruling. Numerous other news outlets also reported on the case at the time.

== Career ==
Hodges is a photographer. Hodges is a member of the UK based Association of Erotic Artists. Hodges has seen his art work displayed in public spaces in Berlin on a pillar in conjunction with the arts company Art Below.

== Inspirations ==
Hodges specialises in photographing the sexuality of woman. He is inspired by female beauty and lists Gustav Klimt, Egon Schiele, Edgar Degas, Auguste Rodin, Gustave Courbet, Man Ray and Helmut Newton as significant inspirations to his work.

== Style and technique ==
Hodges terms much of his work as "Imaginistic", which he defines as "leaving the onlooker to deduct the ultimate conclusion of what his images portray". Although he has experience working in studios, he prefers available light. He believes that he excels in the manipulation and control of light, frequently working at the extremes of both high-key and low-key photography.

== Awards ==
In 2006, Hodges was awarded the title of "Spider Fellow", having won a Nominee Award in the "Black and White Spider Awards". The Spider Awards are for excellence in black and white photography". Hodges was further honored in 2007, when he won a further five Nominee Awards in the 3rd competition. Hodges has also won "Nominee Awards" in the 2006, 2008 and 2009 International Color Awards’ "Photography Masters Cup". Hodges also received an "Honorable Mention" award in the 2008 and 2009 IPA-Lucie Awards in the Fine Art Nude category, for his series "Romantica" and "Nude Shadows". In 2009, Hodges was also a winner in the London International Creative Competition (LICC), for his art nude series "Wrapped".

== Publication ==
Hodges’ work has been published in print and online, including Playboy, GQ, Erotic Review, Met Art, The Photo Paper, The Photography Masters Cup 2008 Yearbook, The World's Greatest Black & White Photography, Volume 1, The Artists Diary, Lux Gallery Magazine, What's Up magazine and the British Museum of Erotic Art.

In 2009, Hodges was also spotlighted as a "Featured Member" by The Lucie Foundation.

Hodges has several book publications, including his monograph Imaginism and an erotic novel, with M. Christian.

== Exhibitions ==
Hodges exhibits his work internationally, including The Italian Cultural Institute, London, the London Underground, The streets of Berlin, the 2008 Venice Biennale, the 2008 Poster Show in New York City and the 2009 International Art Show in Cannes.

== Public collections ==
Hodges’ works can be found in both private and public collections worldwide, including Shanghai University and Chi Mei Museum.
