= Peter Olley =

British artist (born 1942)

- Born: Peter J. Olley; 1942 (age 82–83)
- Education: Royal College of Art (1965) Peter Blake
- Known for: Printmaking

Peter J. Olley (born 1942) is a British artist known for printmaking.

== Selected exhibitions ==
- (1967) Norman Ackroyd, Peter Olley, Shane Weare - Recent Etchings, The Renaissance Society, University of Chicago
  - With foreword by Julian Trevelyan.

== Selected public collections ==
- British Council
- Grinnell College Museum of Art, Grinnell College
- Victoria and Albert Museum
