= List of artists from the Isle of Man =

A list of notable visual artists who were either born on the Isle of Man, or are known for their work on the Isle of Man.

== The list ==
- Rayner Hoff (1894–1937), Manx-born sculptor moved to Australia aged 28
- William Hoggatt (1879–1961), artist who moved to the Isle of Man in 1907
- Bryan Kneale RA (born 1930, Douglas), prize-winning sculptor, now lives in London
- Archibald Knox (1864–1933), a designer with an interest in Celtic art
- Paul Lewthwaite (born 1969, Douglas), a sculptor
- Baillie Scott (1865–1945), artist and architect who studied on the IOM and lived there for 12 years
- Michael Sandle (born 1936), artist and sculptor of anti-war works and commemorative commissions
- Joseph William Swynnerton (1848–1910), was a Manx-born monumental sculptor.

== See also ==
- List of residents of the Isle of Man
