= Vikki Slowe =

English printmaker and painter (1947–2013)

Vikki Slowe RE
- Born: 24 May 1947; London, England
- Died: 3 June 2013 (aged 66)
- Known for: Printmaking, painting
- Elected: Royal Society of Painter-Printmakers
- Website: Vikki Slowe – Art UK

Vikki Slowe RE (1947–2013) was an English printmaker and painter.

Slowe produced etchings. She illustrated the book Purple & Green: Poems by Thirty-Three Women Poets. Slowe's works are held in the collections of the Ben Uri Gallery & Museum. and the Imperial Health Charity Art Collection. Her artworks have received coverage in the Summer Exhibition of the Royal Academy in London (where she exhibited in 1973, 1975, and 1988), from the Smithsonian Institution in the United States, and the Fitzwilliam Museum in Cambridge. She has received mention in the magazines Ambit, The Artist, and Country Life. She was an Honorary Curator for the Royal Society of Painter-Printmakers and a member of the Royal Free Charity Works of Art Committee associated with the Royal Free Hospital in London.
