= David Paskett =

English painter

David Paskett (born 1944) is a contemporary British watercolour artist, and president of the Royal Watercolour Society (R.W.S.) in the United Kingdom.

== Bibliography ==
- A Vision of China - The Paintings of David Paskett. Hong Kong: Hutchison, 2005.
