= Janette Parris =

English artist (born 1962)

Janette Parris (born 1962 in West Ham, East London) is an English contemporary artist who lives and works in London.

== Early life and education ==
Janette Parris was awarded her master's degree in Fine Art at Goldsmiths College in 1994.

== Career ==
Parris typically uses drawing to create strongly narrative work, often in the form of comic strips with a droll satirical humour, or figures that seem like comic-book characters. Her work has been exhibited across the UK.

Her 1998 installation Copyright, using a number of videos and items of Habitat furniture, portrayed everyday tragedies, described by The Independent as "absurd, sad, funny - and too close to home for comfort."

In 2003, she was commissioned to produce a series of works for the "Art on the Underground" programme by London Underground. In 2010, Parris's animated video Talent was shown at Tate Britain's Rude Britannia exhibition.

In 2016, Parris showed her work at Peckham Platform. The work for this exhibition was developed throughout 2015 and depicted the stories she encountered whilst conversing with local residents, traders and students within Peckham's town centre.

In 2021, she had a solo exhibition, "A View without the Bridge: Janette Parris" at the Focal Point Gallery in Southend-on-Sea, Essex.

In 2023, Parris work was included in the "Poor Things" exhibition in the Fruitmarket Gallery in Edinburgh.
