= Pamela Scott Wilkie =

British painter and printmaker

- Born: 1937
- Alma mater: University of Reading; Royal Academy of Arts
- Occupation: Painter, art educator
- Website: www.scottwilkie.co.uk

Pamela Scott Wilkie (born 1937) is a British painter and printmaker.

== Biography ==
Scott Wilkie was born in London, England, in 1937. She was educated at Reading University and then won a Royal Academy David Murray Landscape Scholarship and an award for postgraduate study. Living and working in the USA from 1961 to 1963, Scott Wilkie had her first major solo show in New York and discovered screen printing. In 1970 she drove overland from the UK to Asia as part of an expedition travelling through Turkey, Iran and northern Afghanistan. She set up an improvised print-making studio in Rawalpindi, Pakistan, where she produced Journey, a series of 20 screen prints in an edition of 45, which was based on the experience. This is now in private collections and the permanent collections of the Ikon Gallery and the Victoria & Albert Museum, London.

After returning to the United Kingdom Scott Wilkie has continued to paint, print, produce artist's books and exhibit. She has contributed to many arts programmes which offer creative learning opportunities. During its early days as an artists' co-operative she worked with the Ikon Gallery and she has also curated Arts Council England exhibitions. Lecturing posts have included with the Open College of the Arts for which she was also a National Assessor.

Her work is shown widely in the UK and internationally and has been recognised by awards. Examples of her paintings, prints and artist's books are in private collections in the USA, South America, UK, Continental Europe, Asia and Australia

Public collections include: the Victoria & Albert Museum, London, UK, Australian National Library, Canberra, the University of California, Santa Barbara, USA, Wolfson College, Oxford, UK, the Graves Art Gallery, Sheffield, UK, the City Art Gallery, Worcester, UK, the Ikon Gallery, Birmingham, UK, University of Birmingham, UK, the Oxford Education Committee, UK, Tenby Museum and Art Gallery, Wales, UK, the Harkness Foundation, New York, USA, Birmingham City Library, UK, Southampton City Art Gallery, UK, Rijksmuseum, The Hague, The Netherlands.
