= Peter Wright (ceramicist) =

Peter Wright (30 December 1919 – 20 June 2003) was a British potter and sculptor.

== Biography ==
Wright was born in Hitchin, Hertfordshire in 1919 and was brought up in Enfield Town, north London. After army service in World War Two, he attended Hornsey College of Art from 1946 to 1950, learning graphics but developing his interest in clay. After Hornsey, he was appointed as a teacher of art at Sutton Coldfield College of Further Education. In 1954 he opened his own studio in Monkton Combe, just outside Bath, before relocating to Gloucester Street in the city. His pottery marks dating from 1953 include his initials, his name and the outline of a fish. As an avant-garde ceramic artist and clay sculptor he began teaching at Bath Academy of Art in 1957, the same year in which his work was shown at the Victoria and Albert Museum.

Wright's work has been acquired by several museums around the world.

He died on 20 June 2003 in Bath, Somerset, aged 83.

== Personal life ==
He was married to Sheila and they had one son. The marriage ended in separation in the 1960s.

== Legacy ==
A retrospective exhibition of his work was held at the Bristol Guild of Applied Art Gallery in 2003.
