= Tom Cartmill =

English painter (born 1965)

Tom Cartmill (born 1965, in Ashton-under-Lyne) is an English painter, currently living in Reading, UK. His abstract mixed media paintings focus on the themes of the passage of time and visual perception.
