= Henry Crocket =

English painter

On the Heath (1907)

Henry Edgar Crocket (1870–1926) was a landscape, figure and portrait painter.

He was a member of the Royal Watercolour Society where he exhibited 49 pictures. He also exhibited 14 paintings at the Royal Academy as well as a few others at various art institutions. He shared a studio with Fred Appleyard.

== Further Information ==
Recent Henry Crocket Paintings at Auction: http://www.artnet.com/artist/580847/henry-crocket.html
