= Pete Gilbert (artist) =

British painter and graphic designer (born 1948)

Pete Gilbert (born 1 March 1948) is a British painter and graphic designer. Gilbert has become well known for his moving non-representational, contemporary abstract art.

== Painting ==
Gilbert works mainly in oils on both landscapes and abstract compositions, sometimes using gold or silver leaf. Gilbert's view is that the disparate styles of his paintings reflect who and where he is. The New Forest, Gilbert's home, is a major inspiration: 'I would be a fool not to use the ever-changing colours that the seasons bring. Sunlight through the trees, early morning mists across the river, a bluebell wood right on my doorstep, how could I NOT paint this?'.

Gilbert was one of 50 artists over the age of 50 selected for the "50over50" exhibition at University of Brighton in 2006 and was the winner of the 2006 ArtCare Open exhibition.

== Permanent exhibitions ==
Gilbert's paintings and drawings can be found in numerous private collections, including:

- The de Sigley collection
- The Burtwell-Clark collection
- The Jervis Reed collection
