= List of British painters =

The following is a list of notable English and British painters (in chronological order).

== English painters ==
=== Born 16th century ===
- George Gower (c. 1540–1596)
- Nicolas Hilliard (1547–1619)
- Sir Nathaniel Bacon (1585–1627)
- Cornelis Janssens van Ceulen (1593–1661)
- Sir Anthony van Dyck (1599–1641) – born in Antwerp; Principal Painter in Ordinary to the King
- William Larkin (1580–1619)

=== Born 17th century ===
- Emmanuel de Critz (1608–1665)
- William Dobson (1610–1646)
- John Michael Wright (1617–1694)
- Peter Lely (1618–1680) – Principal Painter in Ordinary to Charles II (1661)
- Oliver de Critz (1626–1651)
- Henry Gibbs (1630/1–1713)
- Edward Bower (fl. 1635–1667)
- Henry Cooke (1642–1700)
- Sir Godfrey Kneller (1646–1723)
- John Riley, or Ryley (1646–1691)
- Marmaduke Cradock (1660–1716)
- Sir James Thornhill (1675–1734)
- Edward Byng (c. 1676–1753)
- Peter Monamy (1681–1749)
- John Wootton (1682–1764)
- Isaac Whood (1689–1752)
- Joseph Highmore (1692–1780)
- John Vanderbank (1694–1739)
- William Hogarth (1697–1764)

== British painters ==
=== Born 18th century ===
- Thomas Hudson (1701–1779)
- Samuel Scott (1702–1772)
- Mary Hoare (1744–1820)
- William Hoare (c. 1707–1792)
- Francis Hayman (1708–1776)
- Sir William Beechey (1753–1839)
- John Shackleton (1714–1767) – Principal Painter in Ordinary to George II and George III
- Richard Wilson (1714–1782)
- William Keable (1714–1774)
- Charles Brooking (1723–1759)
- Sir Joshua Reynolds (1723–1792) – Principal Painter in Ordinary to the King
- George Stubbs (1724–1806)
- Thomas Gainsborough (1727–1788)
- Sawrey Gilpin (1733–1807)
- Johann Zoffany (1733–1810) – born in Frankfurt
- Peter Perez Burdett (c. 1734–1793)
- George Romney (1734–1802)
- Joseph Wright of Derby (1734–1797)
- Jeremiah Meyer (1735–1789) – born in Tübingen
- Richard Wright (1735–c.1775)
- Amos Green (1735–1807)
- Mary Benwell (1739–after 1800)
- John Hamilton Mortimer (1740–1779)
- Henry Fuseli (1741–1825) – born in Zürich
- Matthew William Peters (1742–1814)
- Mary Moser (1744–1819)
- William Hodges (1744–1797)
- Henry Walton (1746–1813)
- William Tate (1747–1806)
- Richard Morton Paye (1751–1820)
- Joseph Barney (1753–1832)
- Charles Lewis (1753–1795) – still life painter
- Maria Bell (1755–1825)
- Prince Hoare the Younger (1755–1834) – painter and dramatist
- Philip (or Philippe) Jean (1755–1802) – of Jersey
- Thomas Stothard (1755–1834)
- Henry Bone (1755–1834)
- William Blake (1757–1827)
- Theophila Gwatkin (1757–1848)
- Thomas Hardy (1757-1804)
- John Hoppner (1758–1810)
- George William Sartorius (1759–1828)
- Lemuel Francis Abbott (1760–1803)
- Sir Thomas Lawrence (1769–1830) – Principal Painter in Ordinary to the King
- George Augustus Wallis (1761–1847)
- George Morland (1763–1804)
- Samuel Drummond (1766–1844)
- John Crome (1768–1821)
- Thomas Barker (1769–1847)
- Martin Archer Shee (1767–1850)
- James Ward (1769–1859)
- Thomas Phillips (1770–1845)
- William Armfield Hobday (1771–1831)
- Edward Bird (1772–1819)
- Charles Henry Schwanfelder (1774–1837)
- Thomas Girtin (1775–1802)
- Joseph Mallord William Turner (1775–1851)
- John Constable (1776–1837)
- John Jackson (1778–1831)
- John Varley (1778–1842)
- William John Huggins (1781–1845), marine painter
- Richard Barrett Davis (1782–1854)
- John Sell Cotman (1782–1842)
- David Cox (1783–1859)
- Sir David Wilkie (1785–1841) – Principal Painter in Ordinary to the King
- Caroline Maria Applebee (c. 1785–1854)
- Benjamin Haydon (1786–1846)
- William Mulready (1786–1863)
- William Etty (1787–1849)
- John Martin (1789–1854)
- William Linton (1791–1876)
- Sir George Hayter (1792–1871) – Principal Painter in Ordinary to the Queen
- Margaret Sarah Carpenter (1793–1872)
- Clarkson Frederick Stanfield (1793–1867)
- Francis Danby (1793–1861)
- Charles Robert Leslie (1794–1859)
- Sir William Charles Ross (1794–1860)
- David Roberts (1796–1864)
- Henry Collen (1797–1879)
- Paul Delaroche (1797–1856)
- Joseph Stannard (1797–1830)
- Frederick Richard Lee (1798–1879)
- Thomas Witlam Atkinson (1799–1861)
- Samuel Atkins, marine painter

=== Born 19th century ===
==== Born 1800–1824 ====
- John Hayter (1800–1895)
- Thomas Webster (1800–1886)
- James Digman Wingfield (1800-1872)
- Sir Edwin Henry Landseer (1802–1873)
- Thomas Sidney Cooper (1803–1902)
- John Scarlett Davis (1804–1845)
- Edwin Wilkins Field (1804–1871)
- William Knight Keeling (1807–1886)
- George Armfield (1808–1893)
- Thomas Baker (1809–1864)
- William Edward Frost (1810–1877)
- James Peel (1811-1906)
- Henry Dawson (1811–1878)
- Ebenezer Colls (1812–1887)
- Richard Barnett Spencer (1812–1897)
- Thomas Musgrave Joy (1812–1866)
- Edmund John Niemann (1813–1876)
- Harry Hall (c. 1814–1882)
- John Absolon (1815–1895)
- James Francis Danby (1816–1875)
- Augustus Egg (1816–1863)
- Edward Matthew Ward (1816–1879)
- Henry Mark Anthony (1817–1886)
- Branwell Brontë (1817–1848)
- Richard Dadd (1817–1886)
- Thomas Danby (1817–1886)
- John Callcott Horsley (1817–1903)
- John Phillip (1817–1867)
- George Frederic Watts (1817–1904)
- Margaret Backhouse (1818–1888)
- Louisa Beresford (1818–1891)
- John Anster Fitzgerald (c. 1819–1906)
- William Powell Frith (1819–1909)
- James Sant (1820–1916)
- Ford Madox Brown (1821–1893)
- Charles Elder (1821–1851)
- Sir Joseph Noel Paton (1821–1901)
- James Smetham (1821–1889)
- Thomas Holroyd (1821–1904)
- Lefevre James Cranstone (1822–1893)
- Frederick Goodall (1822–1904)
- George Hardy (1822–1909)
- William Simpson (1823–1899)
- William Shakespeare Burton (1824–1916)
- Martha Darley Mutrie (1824–1885)
- Frances Emilia Crofton (1822–1910)

==== Born 1825–1849 ====
- Eleanor Vere Boyle (1825–1916)
- Annie Feray Mutrie (1826–1893)
- David Cooke Gibson (1827–1856)
- Frederick Daniel Hardy (1827–1911)
- William Holman Hunt (1827–1910)
- John Wharlton Bunney (1828–1882)
- George Bernard O'Neill (1828–1917)
- Dante Gabriel Rossetti (1828–1882)
- Anna Blunden (1829–1915)
- John Bagnold Burgess (1829–1897)
- John Finnie (1829–1907)
- Edwin Long (1829–1890)
- John Everett Millais (1829–1896)
- John Samuel Raven (1829–1877)
- Lord Frederick Leighton (1830–1896)
- Helen Mabel Trevor (1831–1900)
- Arthur Hughes (1832–1915)
- Louise Rayner (1832–1924)
- Henrietta Ward (1832–1924)
- George Henry Boughton (1833–1905)
- Edward Burne-Jones (1833–1898)
- Benjamin Williams Leader (1833–1921)
- Frederic Shields (1833–1911)
- William Morris (1834–1896)
- Emily Mary Osborn (1834–1913)
- Sir Lawrence Alma-Tadema (1836–1912) – born in Dronrijp
- John Atkinson Grimshaw (1836–1893)
- Walter Field (1837–1901)
- Charles Stuart (1838–1907)
- Walter Goodman (1838–1912)
- Horatio Joseph Lucas (1839-1873)
- Charles Edward Perugini (1839–1918)
- Kate Perugini (1839–1929)
- John Clayton Adams (1840–1906)
- Philip Augustus Barnard (1840–1884)
- Albert Joseph Moore (1841–1893)
- Edith Martineau (1842–1909)
- Edwin Ellis (1842–1895)
- Sydney Prior Hall (1842–1922)
- Thomas Bush Hardy (1842–1897) – marine painter
- Clara Montalba (1842–1929)
- Herbert William Weekes (1841–1914)
- Louise Jopling (1843–1933)
- Bernard Walter Evans (1843–1922)
- Isabel Dacre (1844–1933)
- Tristram Ellis (1844–1922)
- Augustus Edwin Mulready (1844–1904)
- Frances C. Fairman (1839–1923)
- Marie Spartali Stillman (1844–1927)
- Annie Swynnerton (1844–1933)
- Edith Gittins (1845–1910)
- Louisa Starr (1845–1909)
- Edith Corbet (1846–1920)
- Walter Greaves (1846–1930)
- Kate Greenaway (1846–1901)
- William Biscombe Gardner (1847–1919)
- Ellis Rowan (1847–1922)
- Helen Allingham (1848–1926)
- Helen Thornycroft (1848–1937)
- John William Waterhouse (1849–1917)
- John Reinhard Weguelin (1849–1927)
- William Thornley (fl. 1858–1898)

==== Born 1850–1874 ====
- Walter Daniel Batley (1850–1936)
- John Collier (1850–1934)
- Edward Robert Hughes (1851–1914)
- Laura Alma-Tadema (1852–1909)
- George Clausen (1852–1944)
- Alfred Richard Gurrey, Sr. (1852–1944)
- Charles Napier Kennedy (1852–1898)
- Walter Langley (1852–1922)
- Frank Bernard Dicksee (1853–1928)
- Edmund Blair Leighton (1853–1922)
- Alfred Robert Quinton (1853–1934)
- Mary Henrietta Dering Curtois (1854–1929)
- Caroline Gotch (1854–1945)
- Frank Markham Skipworth (1854–1929)
- George Paice (1854–1925)
- Edward Wilkins Waite (1854–1924)
- Sara Page (1855–1943)
- Marianne Stokes (1855–1927)
- Jessie Case Vesel (1855–1937)
- Alfred Wallis (1855–1942)
- Evelyn De Morgan (1855–1919)
- Robert C. Barnfield (1856–1893)
- Jane Mary Dealy, Lady Lewis (1856–1939)
- Alice Hirschberg (1856–1913)
- Joseph Vickers de Ville (1856–1925)
- William Wells Quatremain (1857–1930)
- William Stott-of-Oldham (1857–1900)
- Arthur Melville (1858–1904)
- Henry Scott Tuke (1858–1929)
- George Henry (1858–1943)
- Elizabeth Armstrong Forbes (1859–1912)
- Henrietta Rae (1859–1928)
- Charles W. Bartlett (1860–1940)
- Lewis Charles Powles (1860–1942)
- Wright Barker (1863–1941)
- Christabel Cockerell (1863–1951)
- Margaret Bernadine Hall (1863–1910)
- George Phoenix (1863–1935)
- Arthur Wardle (1864–1949)
- Arthur Lowe (1865–1940)
- John Guille Millais (1865–1931)
- Louise Pickard (1865–1928)
- Charles Spencelayh (1865–1958)
- Milly Childers (1866–1922)
- Mary Davis, Lady Davis (1866–1941)
- Helen Thomas Dranga (1866–1940)
- Roger Fry (1866–1934)
- Helen Beatrix Potter (1866–1943)
- Anna Alma-Tadema (1867–1943) – born in Brussels
- Frank Brangwyn (1867–1956) – born in Bruges
- Percy Robertson (1868–1934)
- Ursula Wood (1868–1925)
- Mary Baylis Barnard (1870–1946)
- Mary McEvoy (1870–1941)
- Aubrey Vincent Beardsley (1872–1898)
- Eleanor Fortescue-Brickdale (1872–1945)
- William Heath Robinson (1872–1944)
- Henry Keyworth Raine (1872–1932)
- Alexander Scott (1872–1932)
- William Nicholson (1872–1949)
- Louie Burrell (1873–1971)
- Amy Drucker (1873–1951)
- Arthur Miles Moss (1873-1948)
- Edmund Hodgson Smart (1873–1942)
- Isabel Codrington (1874–1943)

==== Born 1875–1899 ====
- Arthur Henry Knighton-Hammond (1875–1970)
- Madge Oliver (1875–1924)
- Sophie Atkinson (1876–1972)
- Winifred Austen (1876–1964)
- Isobelle Ann Dods-Withers (1876–1939)
- Gwen John (1876–1939)
- Frank Cadogan Cowper (1877–1958)
- Ethel Fanny Everett (1877-1951)
- Laura Knight (1877–1970)
- Frank Montague Moore (1877–1967)
- Walter Ernest Webster (1877–1959)
- Hilda Annetta Walker (1877–1960)
- Eliza Mary Burgess (1878–1961)
- May Louise Greville Cooksey (1878–1943)
- Augustus John (1878–1961)
- Vanessa Bell (1879–1961)
- Gertrude Harvey (1879–1966)
- John Hodgson Lobley (1879–1954)
- Anna Airy (1882–1964)
- Gladys Kathleen Bell (1882–1965)
- Teresa Copnall (1882–1972)
- Helen Edwards (1882–1963)
- Richard Howard Penton (1882–1960)
- Eleanor Hughes (1882–1952)
- Averil Burleigh (1883–1949)
- Montague Birrell Black 1884-1964)
- John Currie (1884–1914)
- Wyndham Lewis (1884–1957)
- Louisa Puller (1884–1963)
- Hilary Dulcie Cobbett (1885–1976)
- Duncan Grant (1885–1978)
- Esther Blaikie MacKinnon (1885–1934)
- Evelyn Abelson (1886–1967)
- Mary Jewels (1886–1977)
- James Ardern Grant (1887–1973)
- Laurence Stephen Lowry (1887–1976)
- Archibald Eliot Haswell Miller (1887–1979)
- Elizabeth Polunin (1887–1950)
- Stanley Royle (1888–1961)
- Paul Cranfield Smyth (1888–1963)
- Margaret Lindsay Williams (1888–1960)
- Nora Cundell (1889–1948)
- Paul Nash (1889–1946)
- Cedric Morris (1889–1982)
- Marlow Moss (1889-1958)
- Sir Henry Rushbury (1889–1968)
- Ruth Simpson (1889–1964)
- David Bomberg (1890-1957)
- Olive Mudie-Cooke (1890–1925)
- Leon Underwood (1890–1975)
- Grace English (1891–1956)
- Stanley Spencer (1891–1959)
- Dora Carrington (1893–1932)
- Orovida Camille Pissarro (1893–1968)
- Cowan Dobson (1894–1980)
- Kaff Gerrard (1894–1970)
- Meredith Frampton (1894–1984)
- Ben Nicholson (1894–1982)
- Cicely Mary Barker (1895–1973)
- Henry George Hoyland (1895-1947)
- Harry Bateman (1896–1976)
- George Bissill (1896–1973)
- Leila Faithfull (1896–1994)
- Billie Waters (1896–1979)
- Dorothy Coke (1897–1979)
- Hans Feibusch (1898–1998) – born in Frankfurt, resided in England 1934–1998
- Winifred Knights (1899–1947)
- Rose Henriques (1889–1972)
- Francis Helps (1890–1972)

=== Unknown year, born 19th century ===
- Edward Pritchett (fl. 1828–1864)
- Florence Claxton (fl. 1840–1879)
- Sara Macgregor (d. 1919)

=== Born 20th century ===
==== Born 1900–1949 ====
- George Lambourn (1900–1977)
- Elsie Dalton Hewland (1901–1979)
- John Mansbridge (1901–1981)
- Marjorie May Bacon (1902–1988)
- Marjorie Frances Bruford (1902–1958)
- Frank Barrington Craig (1902–1951)
- John Melville (1902–1986)
- Thomas Symington Halliday (1902–1998)
- John Piper (1903–1992)
- Eric Ravilious (1903–1942)
- Ceri Richards (1903–1971)
- Graham Sutherland (1903–1980)
- Mary Adshead (1904–1995)
- Celia Frances Bedford (1904–1959)
- Helen Binyon (1904–1979)
- George Fisher Gilmour (1904–1984)
- J. Edward Smith (1905–1986)
- Griselda Allan (1905–1987)
- Eliot Hodgkin (1905–1987)
- Cecil Kennedy (1905–1997)
- Emmy Bridgwater (1906–1999)
- Patrick Hall (1906–1992)
- Edgar Hubert (1906–1985)
- Clifford Ellis (1907–1985)
- Frank Egginton (1908–1990)
- Isobel Heath (1908–1989)
- Thomas Carr (1909–1999)
- Mildred Eldridge (1909–1991)
- Geoffrey Tibble (1909–1952)
- Francis Bacon (1909–1992)
- Peter Rose Pulham (1910–1956)
- Isabel Alexander (1910–1996)
- John Bensusan-Butt (1911–1997)
- John Kingsley Cook (1911–1994)
- Anthony Devas (1911–1958)
- Gwen Barnard (1912–1988)
- Fay Pomerance (1912–2001)
- Raymond Teague Cowern (1913–1986)
- Leonard Appelbee (1914–2000)
- John Bridgeman (1914–2004)
- Sylvia Molloy (1914–2008)
- Doris Blair (born 1915)
- Terry Frost (1915–2003)
- William Gear (1915–1997)
- Eileen Aldridge (1916–1990)
- Leonora Carrington (1917–2011)
- Michael Kidner (1917–2009)
- Mary Audsley (1919–2008)
- Eden Box (1919–1988)
- Francis Davison (1919–1984)
- Colin Hayes (1919–2003)
- Heinz Koppel (1919–1980) – born in Berlin; lived in Liverpool
- Patrick Heron (1920–1999)
- John Christoforou (1921–2014)
- John Craxton (1922–2009)
- Richard Hamilton (1922–2011)
- Lucian Freud (1922–2011)
- Pamela Ascherson (1923–2010)
- Paul Bird (1923–1993)
- Peter Folkes (1923–2019)
- Martin Froy (1926–2017)
- Eric Rimmington (1926–2024)
- Ann Thetis Blacker (1927–2006)
- Peter Brook (1927–2009)
- John Plumb (1927–2008)
- Patrick Swift (1927–1983) – born in Ireland
- John Copnall (1928–2007)
- Elizabeth Jane Lloyd (1928–1995)
- Adrian Morris (1929–2004)
- Gillian Ayres (1930–2018)
- Mardi Barrie (1930–2004)
- Robyn Denny (1930–2014)
- Eva Frankfurther (1930–1959) – born in Germany
- Frank Auerbach (1931–2024) – born in Germany
- Martin Bradley (1931–2023)
- Ken Messer (1931–2018)
- Bridget Riley (born 1931)
- Peter Blake (born 1932)
- Howard Hodgkin (1932–2017)
- Moira Huntly (born 1932)
- Norman Douglas Hutchinson (1932–2010)
- Marc Vaux (born 1932)
- Alexander Goudie (1933–2004)
- Dennis Roy Hodds (1933–1987)
- John Hoyland (1934–2011)
- Jeremy Moon (1934–1973)
- Ivor Davies (born 1935)
- Ken Kiff (1935–2001)
- Patrick Caulfield (1936–2005)
- Timothy Behrens (1937–2017)
- David Hockney (1937–2026)
- Tess Jaray (born 1937)
- Bryan Organ (born 1935)
- Margot Perryman (born 1938)
- William Tillyer (born 1938)
- Mario Dubsky (1939–1985)
- John Wonnacott (born 1940)
- Robert Lenkiewicz (1941–2002)
- Sheila Mullen (born 1942)
- Osi Rhys Osmond (1943–2015)
- Lindsay Bartholomew (born 1944)
- Claire Dalby (born 1944)
- Bruce McLean (born 1944)
- Jonathon Coudrille (born 1945)
- P. J. Crook (born 1945)
- Ali Omar Ermes (born 1945)
- David Imms (born 1945)
- Sean Scully (born 1945) – born in Dublin; studied in London and Newcastle; lives and works abroad.
- Timothy Hyman (born 1946)
- Tony Foster (born 1946)
- Edward Kelly (born 1946)
- John Virtue (born 1947)
- Howard J. Morgan (1949–2020)
- Terance James Bond (1946–2023)

==== Born 1950–1999 ====
- Cherryl Fountain (born 1950)
- Braaq (1951–1997)
- Roy Petley (born 1951)
- Chinwe Chukwuogo-Roy MBE (1952–2012)
- Jeremy Henderson (1952–2009)
- Brian Clarke (1953–2025)
- Shani Rhys James (born 1953)
- Deirdre Hyde (born 1953)
- Charlotte Verity (born 1954)
- Vivien Blackett (born 1955)
- Peter Edwards (born 1955)
- Nicholas Hely Hutchinson (born 1955)
- Jo Self (born 1956)
- Panayiotis Kalorkoti (born 1957)
- John O'Carroll (born 1958)
- Peter Doig (born 1959)
- Claudette Johnson (born 1959)
- David Leapman (born 1959)
- Ian Davenport (born 1960)
- Nick Fudge (born 1960)
- Keith Piper (born 1960)
- Sonia Boyce (born 1962)
- Gary Hume (born 1962)
- Tod Hanson (born 1963)
- Guy Denning (born 1965)
- Damien Hirst (born 1965)
- Mark Alexander (born 1966)
- George Shaw (born 1966)
- Chris Ofili (born 1968)
- Chantal Joffe (born 1969)
- Justin Mortimer (born 1970)
- Banksy (born c. 1974)
- Tom Palin (born 1974)
- Stuart Pearson Wright (born 1975)
- Idris Khan (born 1978)
- Kate Groobey (born 1979)
- David Wightman (born 1980)
- Seb Toussaint (born 1988)
- Emily Powell (born 1990)
- Bianca Raffaella (born 1992)
- Rachel G. Patrick (born 1993)

=== Unknown year, born 20th century ===
- Freya Douglas-Morris
- Charles Harris

== See also ==
- British art
- English school of painting
- List of British artists
