= Sylvia Molloy =

Sylvia Molloy may refer to:

- Sylvia Clark Molloy (1914–2008), British Realist and Impressionist artist and teacher
- Sylvia Molloy (writer) (1938–2022), Argentine professor, author, editor and essayist
