= William Ball Spencer =

British painter (1854–1923)

- Born: 22 June 1854; Stepney
- Died: 23 September 1923 (aged 69); Thorpe-le-Soken
- Occupation: Painter
- Parent(s): Richard Ball Spencer

William Ball Spencer (sometimes known incorrectly as William Barnett Spencer) (1854-1923) was a British marine painter. He was the son of Richard Ball Spencer.
