= Todd Hanson (disambiguation) =

Todd Hanson (born 1968) is an American writer and voice actor.

Todd Hanson may also refer to:

- Todd Hanson (born 1984), a ring name used by Ivar (wrestler)
- Tod Hanson (born 1963), a painter and graphic artist
