= Sheila Mullen =

Sheila Mullen may refer to:

- Sheila Mullen (model) (born 1957), American model
- Sheila Mullen (artist) (born 1942), Scottish painter
