= Richard Ball Spencer =

English painter

- Born: 11 November 1812; St Pancras
- Died: 1897 (aged 84–85); West Ham
- Occupation: Painter
- Children: William Ball Spencer

Richard Ball Spencer (also, incorrectly, Richard Barnett Spencer) was a British marine painter, active from 1840 to 1874.

A son William Ball Spencer (1854-1923) (sometimes, incorrectly known as, Richard Barnett Spencer) also became active as a ship portraitist.

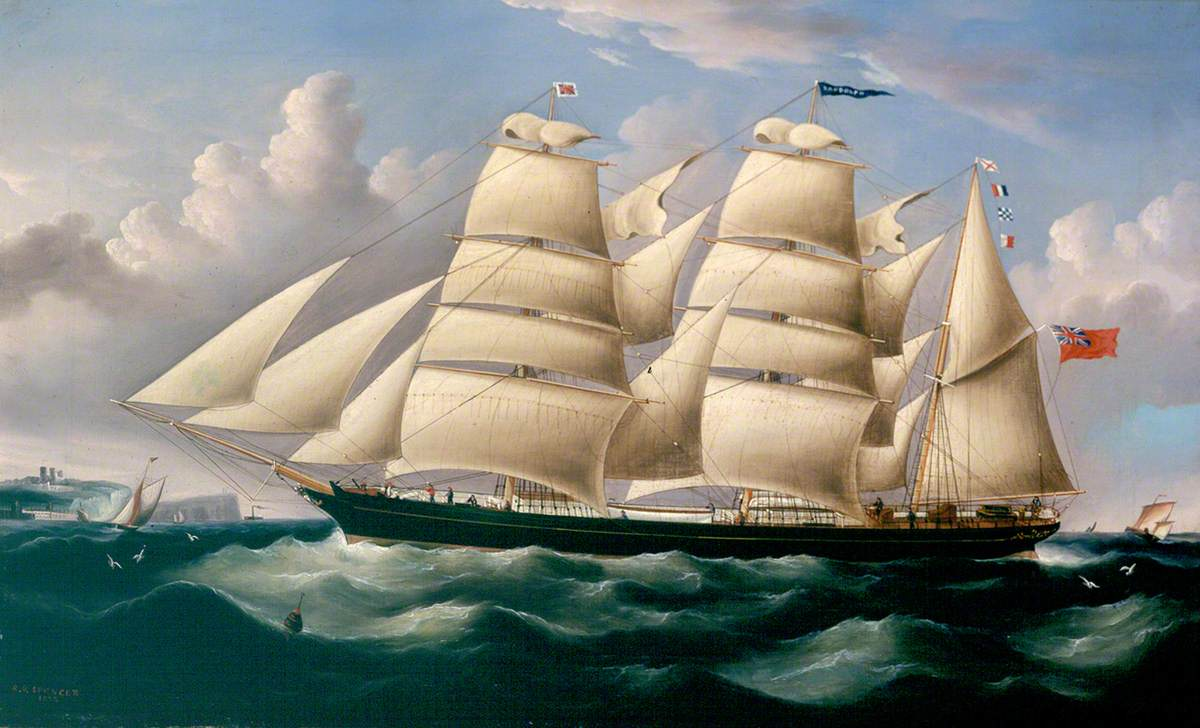
Barque 'Randolph'

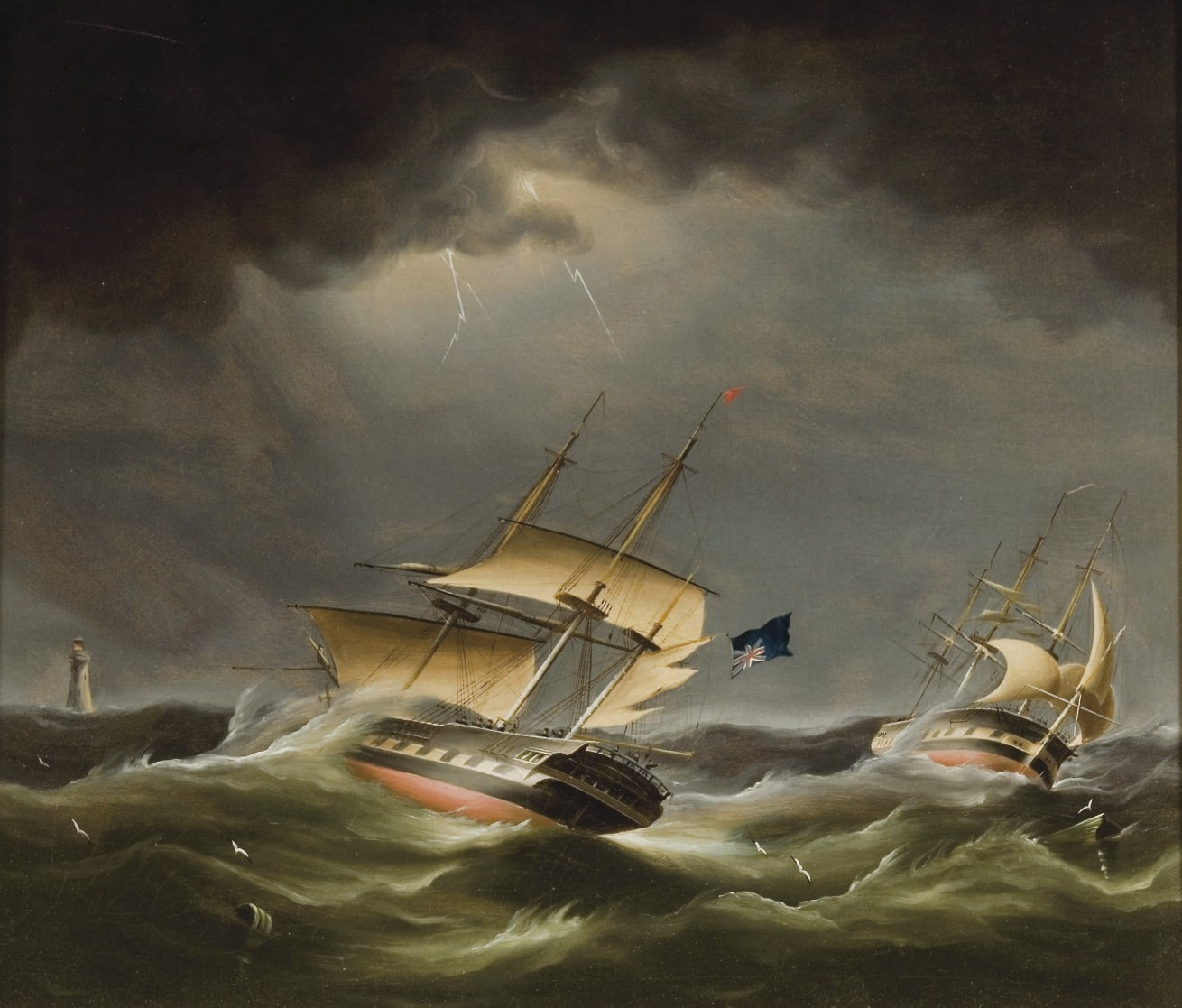
Rescue off Eddystone Light

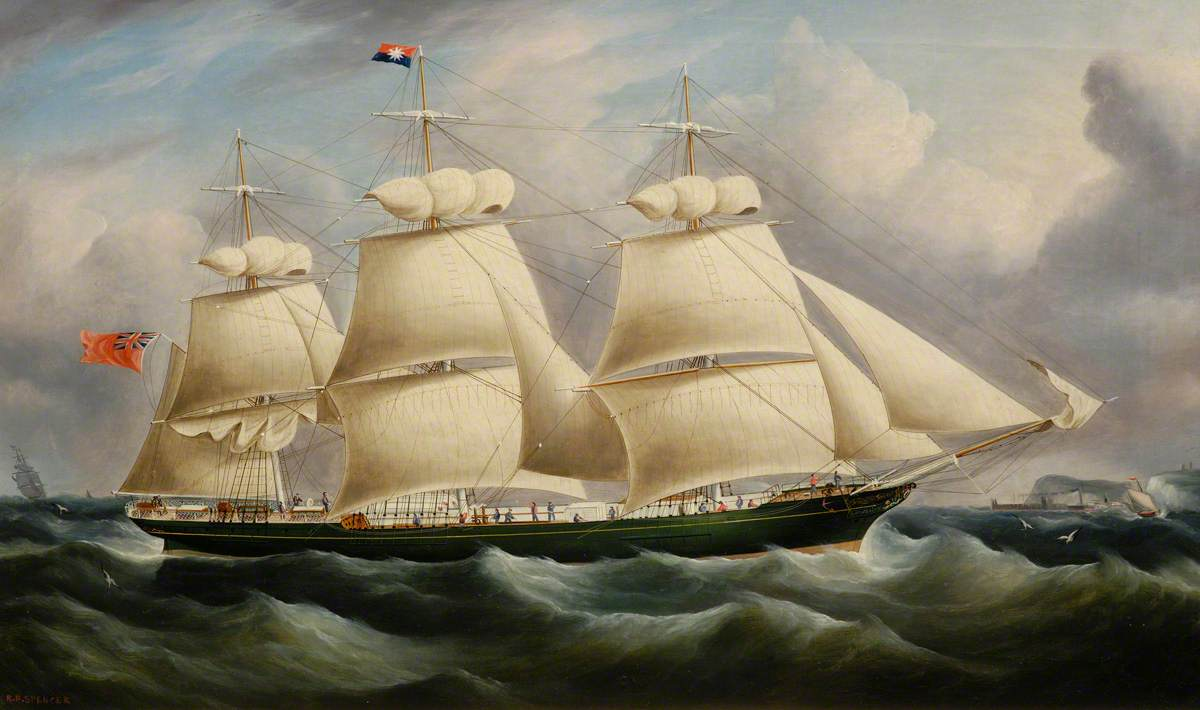
Queen of Nations
