= Worshipful Company of Chartered Surveyors =

Livery company of the City of London

The Worshipful Company of Chartered Surveyors is one of the Livery Companies of the City of London. The organisation was granted Letters Patent in May 1977 and a Royal Charter 13 June 2013. The Company promotes surveying by awarding scholarships.

The Company ranks eighty-fifth in the order of precedence for Livery Companies. Its motto is Modus ab initio, which is Latin for "Method from the very beginning" and its church is St Lawrence Jewry The landscape painter Richard Howard Penton's drawings in Halls of the Livery Companies of the City of London were re-published in 1981 to mark their grant of livery status.

The Company does not have its own livery hall and meets and dines in a selection of the 35 different livery halls in London.

== See also ==
- Royal Institution of Chartered Surveyors
