= John Wharlton Bunney =

English painter

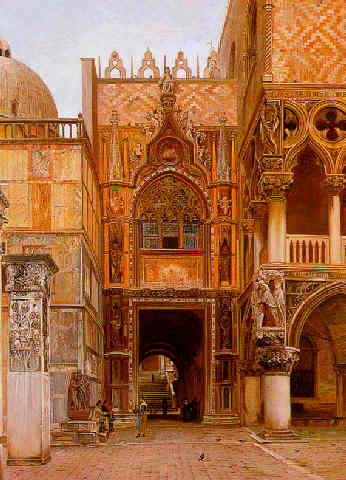
One of Bunney's Venetian paintings, La porta della Carta nel Palazzo Ducale, Venezia, 1879

John Wharlton Bunney (20 June 1828 – 23 September 1882) was an English topographical and landscape artist of the nineteenth century.

His father was a merchant captain whom Bunney, as a boy, accompanied on several voyages around the world. Bunney demonstrated a strong talent for drawing and draftsmanship from an early age. The young Bunney became a follower of John Ruskin; he studied under Ruskin at the Working Men's College soon after its founding in 1854, and later worked as a clerk for Smith, Elder & Co., Ruskin's publisher. Bunney was able to give up his clerical job and make his living by his art and art teaching by 1859; Ruskin commissioned him to execute a series of drawings in Italy and Switzerland.

Bunney married Elizabeth Fallon in 1863. The couple settled in Florence; they had four children, including the Hampstead Garden Suburb architect, Michael Bunney. Bunney worked for Ruskin's St. George's Company (later the Guild of St George) in northern Italy for the remainder of his life. In his career there, Bunney produced a noteworthy pictorial record of Italy in his era. Ruskin said that Bunney's work was "so faithful and careful as almost to enable the spectator to imagine himself on the spot." Bunney was a friend of many of the Pre-Raphaelites, especially William Holman Hunt.

From 1870 on, Bunney lived and painted in Venice. In 1876 Ruskin commissioned Bunney to paint a picture that included the entire western facade of St. Mark's Basilica; Bunney worked on this project through "six hundred early-morning sessions" spaced over six years. (Ruskin was campaigning to prevent a renovation of the west front of St. Mark's, and the painting was part of this effort.) One day during this period, James Abbott McNeill Whistler, no admirer of Ruskin (Whistler had bankrupted himself in an 1878 libel suit against Ruskin), reportedly sneaked up behind Bunney as Bunney worked, to stick a note to his back. The note read, "I am totally blind." Bunney, absorbed in his work, remained oblivious to Whistler's prank. The painting now hangs in the Ruskin Gallery in the Millennium Galleries in Sheffield.

After Bunney died in 1882, Ruskin started a memorial fund to benefit his widow and children.

== See also ==
- Edward Pritchett
