= Edward Pritchett =

English painter

- Born: Edward Prickett; 1807; Northamptonshire
- Died: January 12, 1876 (aged 68–69); 19 Westmoreland Place, Camberwell
- Resting place: Nunhead Cemetery

Edward Pritchett (1807-1876) was a nineteenth-century English painter and man of mystery.

Little is known of Pritchett's life; he has appropriately been described as "elusive." Pritchett spent periods over three decades living and working in Venice, producing admirable views of the city; he was one of a group of English artists who produced notable records of the scenes of northern Italy, a group that included John Wharlton Bunney, James Holland, the brothers-in-law Luke Fildes and Henry Woods, and, in a later generation, William Logsdail.
