= Henry George Hoyland =

English painter

Henry George Hoyland (January 1895 – 29 October 1947) was a Sheffield-born portrait and figure painter. After studying in Sheffield, London and Paris, he returned to Sheffield to teach at the Sheffield School of Art from 1921 to 1929, as well exhibiting as an artist. In 1930 he moved to London with his family to continue his career as a painter.

== Early life ==
Henry George Hoyland was born in January 1895 in Sheffield and was brought up on Infirmary Road, opposite Sheffield General Infirmary. His parents were George and Rosa Hoyland, and his father ran a hairdressing business from the family home. Hoyland was known as "Harry" to his parents and brothers Colin and Leonard, and sister Mabel. By the age of 16, Hoyland was studying to be an artist. At this time the fsmily was living on Crooksmoor Road.

Harry enlisted in January 1916 but only served 8 days before he was discharged. The reason is not known – the service record is 'Not being likely to become an efficient soldier.' 18 months later, perhaps encouraged by tales from his younger brother, Harry enlisted again this time hoping to join the Royal Flying Corps. But this was not to be. He was assessed as being 'unfit as FO in any capacity' and transferred to the 10th Battalion of the London Rifle Brigade. He was called up again on 14 August 1917. Harry was in France for about two months early in 1918 before being sent back to the UK. He was discharged as being 'no longer physically fit for war service' in October 1918. When Hoyland was called up, he was recorded as living on Western Bank, Sheffield, and was working as a laboratory assistant.

== Art career ==
Hoyland was a member of the Royal Society of British Artists, a member of the Society of Graphic Artists, and a member of the Sheffield Society of Artists. As well as portrait and figure paintings, Hoyland also painted flowers and landscapes, and experimented with wood cuts. In October 1931, Hoyland was quoted as saying that he believed the reason why there were so many schools of art at the time, was because it reflected the uncertainty and perplexity of the present age. He felt it would be a generation before artists could reach some measure of agreement as to what constitutes a good picture, but currently in a period of transition and change.

He exhibited work at the Walker Art Gallery in Liverpool, the New English Art Club, the Royal Academy, the Royal Cambrian Academy, the Royal Scottish Academy, Royal Society of British Artists, Sheffield Society of Artists, Mappin Art Gallery in Sheffield, and the English Wood Engraving Society.

== Personal life ==
It is unknown when exactly Hoyland studied art in London and Paris, but by 1921 Hoyland is recorded as teaching as Sheffield School of Art. In 1927, Hoyland is recorded as living on Oakbrook Road. In 1928, Hoyland married Sarah M. Mitchell-Withers in Sheffield, and they had their first daughter, Rosemary, in 1929. By 1929 Hoyland was recorded as living on Psalter Lane, Sheffield, and having his studio on Surrey Street.

Towards the end of 1930, Hoyland moved his family to London, settling on Alleyn Road, Dulwich. His studio was based in the family home, and the house is supposedly where Charles Dickens wrote some of the Pickwick Papers. While living at this house, their second daughter, Karen, was born in 1936. Hoyland died on 29 October 1947 in London.

== Works ==
Known examples of Hoyland's work include:

- The First Violins – a woodcut exhibited in November 1931 at the English Wood Engraving Society at Colnaghi's
- Sir Henry Hadlow – exhibited at his Surrey Street studio in October 1930
- A. M. Connell (1931) – held by Sheffield Teaching Hospitals NHS Foundation Trust https://artuk.org/discover/artworks/a-m-connell-18721945-frcs-ed-ch-m-sheff-honorary-surgeon-sheffield-infirmary-19011931-professor-of-surgery-19131930-78177
- The Tub Spinner, Circus Horses and Cruft's Dog Show at the Agricultural Hall – exhibited at the Royal Society of British Artists in spring 1932
- The Sea Wall – bought by Leeds Gallery February/March 1935
- Pantaloon – exhibited with other paintings about the Circus in a one-man show in London, November 1938
- Garden Scene, Summer (1930s) – held by the Garden Museum
- Saint Thomas, 1914–1918 – held by Museums Sheffield
