= Freya Douglas-Morris =

Painter

- Born: London, England
- Education: Royal College of Art, Brighton University
- Style: Landscape, Figurative
- Website: www.freyadouglas-morris.com

Freya Douglas-Morris (born 1980) is a landscape and figurative painter based in London.

== Personal life ==
Freya Douglas-Morris was born in London 1980. She received a Bachelor's degree in painting from Brighton University and a Master's degree from the Royal College of Art. Douglas-Morris lives and works in London and she has 2 children.

== Career ==
In her work as a painter, Douglas-Morris predominantly paints landscapes suffused with rich colour.

Her work has been featured in various publications, The Anomie Review of Contemporary British Painting 2, 'Paper' Saatchi Gallery and ‘100 Painters of Tomorrow’.

In December 2023, a book was published to mark her 2023 solo show with Alexander Berggruen Gallery NY titled 'This star I give to you'.
