= Sara Macgregor =

British painter

- Died: 1919

Sara Macgregor or McGregor (died 1919) was a British painter.

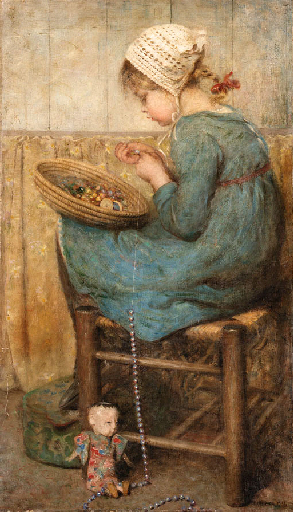
Stringing the Beads, 1913

Little is known of her life. She exhibited works at the Royal Scottish Academy from 1898 onwards.

A work Stringing the Beads signed and dated 'S.McGregor. 1913.' was auctioned at Christie's in New York, 28 October 1998.
