= William Anslow Thornbery =

English painter

William Anslow Thornbery aka William Thornley (fl. 1858 – 1898) was an English marine painter, mainly of coastal scenes. He is generally identified with an artist signing as William A. Thornbery, and sometimes with the artist signing William A. Thornbury in the 1880s. Close in style to Hubert Thornley, who also painted coastal scenes, he was possibly related.

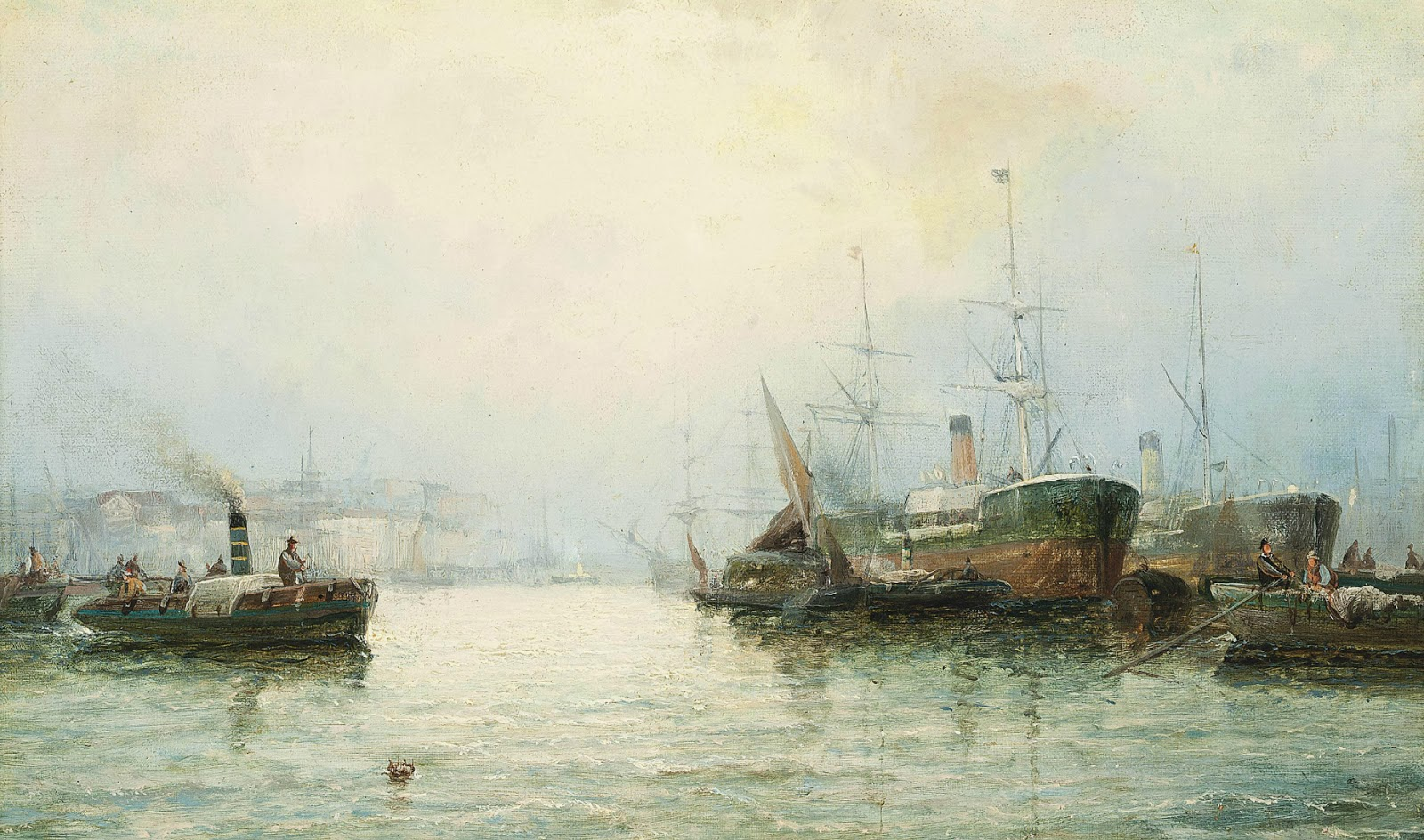
A Misty Morning on the Thames

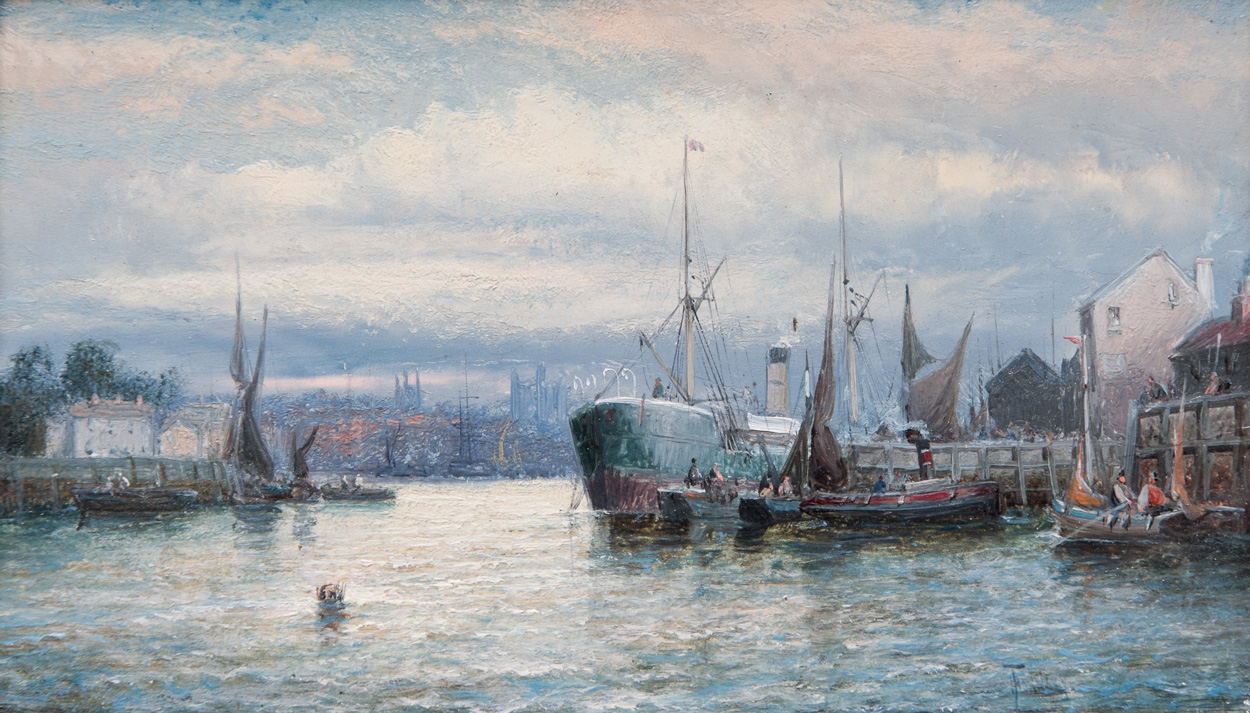
The Medway below Rochester
