= Arthur Miles Moss =

Anglican vicar, lepidopterist and painter (1873–1948)

The Reverend Arthur Miles Moss (1873-1948) was vicar of the largest Anglican parish in the world in Pará, Brazil, and also a noted amateur lepidopterist, artist and musician. His collection of watercolour drawings of Lepidoptera larvae are held at the Natural History Museum, London who bought them from his patron Walter Rothschild, 2nd Baron Rothschild.

== Biography ==
Moss was educated at Trinity College, Cambridge from 1891 to 1894, where he was a choral scholar of King's College and president of the Natural History Society. From 1895 to 1898 he was curate of Holy Trinity, Birkenhead, then curate at Kendal Parish Church, and from 1901 to 1907 he was precentor of Norwich Cathedral. Although continuing a career in the church his passion was lepidoptera (moths and butterflies), so he jumped at the chance to work for the Anglican church in South America. Moss became expert on South American lepidoptera and produced a lot of valuable research, including specimens and drawings which are still in use today in the Natural History Museum. He achieved wider fame for having the largest parish in the world while based in a remote part of Brazil. He was also a talented artist, painting many landscapes, seascapes and tree studies, and his paintings have been exhibited at the Royal Academy in London.

== A chaplain in South America ==
In 1907 Moss became chaplin of Lima, Peru. He visited Pará, Brazil for the first time in 1911 at the wish of Bishop Every, Anglican Bishop for Eastern South America, returning in 1912 to build the small Pará Anglican Church in Belem seating 150 at a cost of around £1,000. Moss was to be responsible for the whole Amazon basin, a district stretching from Peru to the Atlantic including from Iquitos to Ceará and from Manáos to Porto Velho. This area was 3,000 miles from east to west by 800 across which he estimated to be about 1/24th of the world's land mass.

In 1945 he returned home to Liverpool to seek treatment for his arthritis. He died in 1948 in Kendal.

== Lepidoptera collections ==
Moss was a keen naturalist and already in his teens he was corresponding with butterfly collecting grandees such as the Rothschild family. After just 3 years in Peru he had published a guide to Peruvian butterflies which earned a complimentary letter from the president of Peru. In Brazil he took particular interest in the early stages of insects. While travelling around his parish he was able to combine his ministry with continuing his research. He was fortunate to have rich backers who financed his lepidoptera research, especially the second Lord Rothschild, who was building up the greatest collection of butterflies and moths ever made in his collection at Tring Museum, Hertfordshire (he collected 2 million butterflies and moths). Rothschild's Tring collection was eventually taken over by the Natural History Museum. Moss' lepidoptera specimens are still considered a valuable resource today and 25,000 Brazilian lepidoptera are stored in the Natural History Museum at Tring. Due to his accurate artwork and precision, Moss' collection of lepidoptera drawings and notes are so important they are maintained in a separate collection at the Natural History Museum today. Moss was visited in Brazil by the lepidopterist, traveller and diarist Margaret Fountaine, who described him as "one of the world's great butterfly experts" and a "kindred spirit".

== Bibliography ==
- Moss, A.M. (1908) A souvenir of the Oroya Railroad: A brief pictorial account of the Peruvian Andes. Charles F. Southwell, Lima, 80 pp.
- Moss, A.M. (1909) A trip into the interior of Peru. Charles F. Southwell, Lima, 40 pp.
- Moss, A.M. (1912) On the Sphingidae of Peru. Transactions of the Zoological Society of London, 20, 73-134.
- Moss, A.M. (1919) The Papilios of Pará. Novitates Zoologicae, 26, 295-319.
- Moss, A.M. (1920) The Sphingidae of Pará, Brazil. Novit. Zool., 27, 333-424.
- Moss, A.M. (1927) The species of Adelpha occurring at Pará. Proceedings of the Entomological Society of London A, 1, 33-34.
- Moss, A.M. (1927) "Terrifying attitude" in a hesperid pupa. Proceedings of the Entomological Society of London A, 1, 34.
- Moss, A.M. (1933) Butterflies from the Amazons attracted to coloured rags, etc. Proceedings of the Royal Entomological Society of London A, 7, 60.
- Moss, A.M. (1933) The early stages of Hesperiidae from the Amazons. Proceedings of the Royal Entomological Society of London A, 7, 60.
- Moss, A.M. (1933) The gregarious sleeping habits of certain Ithomiine and Heliconine butterflies in Brazil. Proceedings of the Royal Entomological Society of London A, 7, 66-67.
- Moss, A.M. (1933) Some generalizations on Adelpha, a Neotropical genus of nymphalid butterflies of the group Limenitidi. Novitates Zoologicae, 39, 12-20.
- Moss, A.M. (1935) Some details concerning the brassolid butterfly, Dynastor macrosiris, its early stages, life history and food-plants. Proceedings of the Royal Entomological Society of London A, 9, 97-102.
- Moss, A.M. (1945) The Castnia of Pará, with notes on others (Lep., Castniidae). Proceedings of the Royal Entomological Society of London B, 14, 48-52.
- Moss, A.M. (1947) Notes on the Syntomidae of Pará, with special reference to wasp mimicry and fedegoso, Heliotropium indicum (Boraginaceae), as attractant. Entomologist, 80, 30-35.
- Moss, A.M. (1949) Biological notes on some "Hesperiidae" of Pará and the Amazon. (Lep. Rhop.) (edited by K. J. Howard). Acta Zoologica Lilloana, 7, 27-80.
- Williams, C.B. (1948) Arthur Miles Moss (1873-1948). Proceedings of the Entomological Society of London (C), 12, 65.
- "Moss Collection Of Lepidoptera Larvae Drawings", 1929
