= George Paice (painter) =

English painter

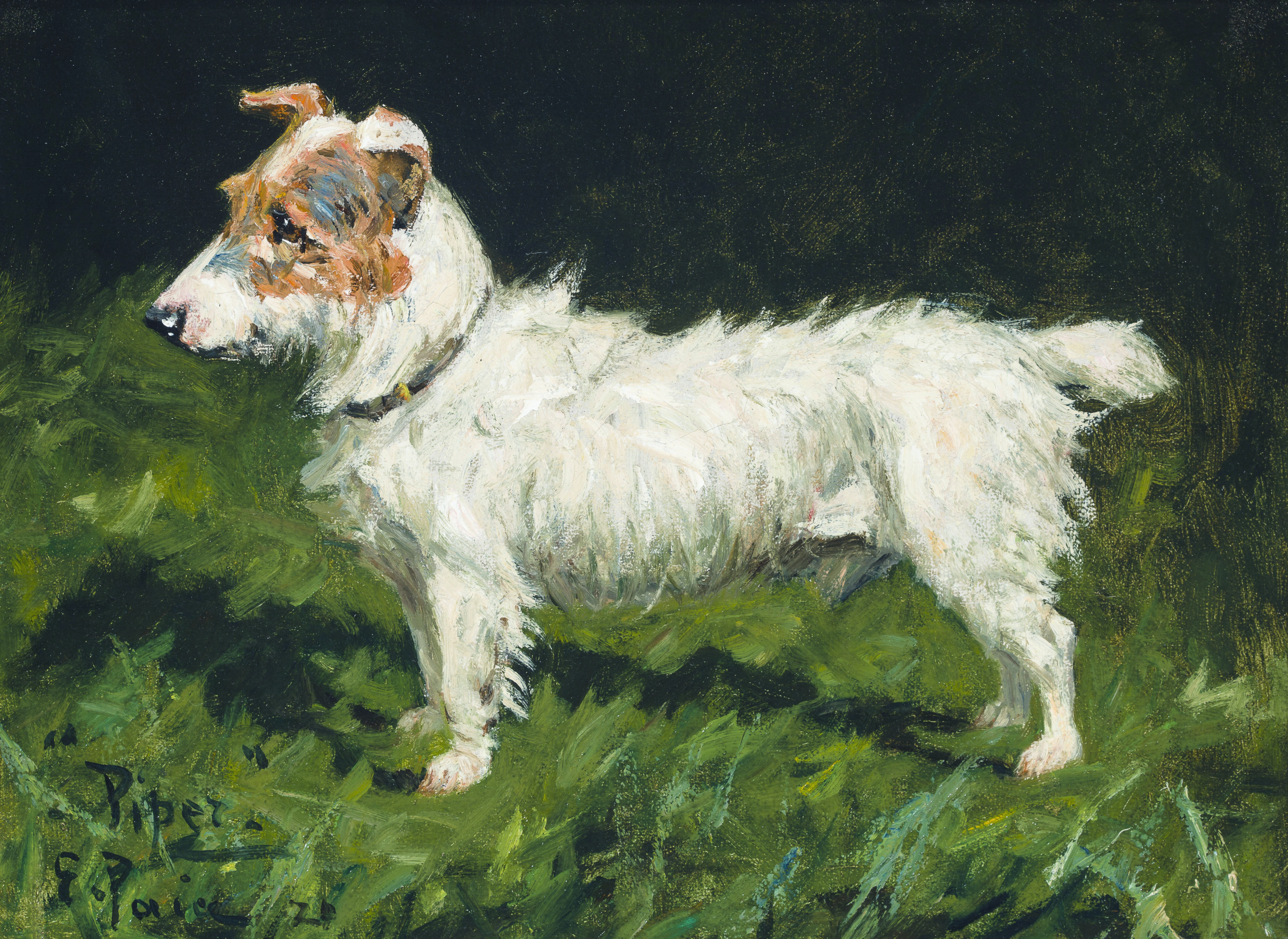
Piper, a Jack Russell Terrier (1920)

George Thomas Paice (24 November 1854 – 14 March 1925) was a British landscape, canine, hunting, and equestrian painter.

Born in Pimlico, London, Paice studied at the Heatherley School of Fine Art and at the Royal Academy from 1905 to 1910. He worked mostly for private collectors, his paintings almost never present at public exhibitions. Nevertheless, he did exhibit his works at the Royal Academy and at the Royal Society of British Artists, gaining notoriety among the wealthy. He was quickly a much sought-after artist by the English aristocracy, one or two mecenes encouraging his work. Probably for that reason, most of his paintings remained in private collections until two decades ago when some of those works appeared in world known Auction Houses such as Christie's (South Kensington, 20/06/91).

After his marriage in 1879, he and his wife, Eunice Mary Stuart, moved to Croydon where Paice painted most of his horses and dogs, although he did paint some point-to-point landscapes, these larger than the usually small format animal portraits he was commissioned to paint (among the most known and famous artworks of Paice are "The Red Lion Inn, Wendlesbury, Nr. Bicester, Oxfordshire", "'Jenny' a bay hunter in a landscape", and "A saddled bay hunter in a stable with a goat"). Rarely did he paint people, one of the few exceptions being his own self-portrait. He used various signatures: "P" ('A bay horse at a manger in a stable interior', 1883), "GPaice" - P and G superposed -('Huntsmen and Hounds', 1886, Lotherton Hall, Leeds Museums and Galleries), "G.Paice" ('Swanington', 1907), "George Paice" ('Two Pugs on a Red Divan', 1880).

A wealthy artist at the beginning of the 20th century, Paice suffered a great loss of money during World War I due to lack of commissions but continued painting until his death.

Strangely enough, George Paice remains absent from many Art Dictionaries, although his paintings travelled overseas, as referred in The National Sporting Library (NSL) Newsletter, Spring 2008: "Mrs. Dulaney also contributed an oil painting by British artist George Paice (1854–1925), Hunter in a BoxStall with Docked Tail, in which the handsome bay poses alertly in a spacious box stall, eyeing the viewer".

== Works ==
- Walker Art Gallery, Liverpool
  - "'Marsh Mallow'" (1920)
- Leeds Art Gallery
  - "Three Horses: 'Whissendine', 'Swallow' and 'Tiptop'" (1886)
  - "Huntsmen and Hounds" (1886) - a gift by Sir Alvary and Lady Gascoigne, 1968
- National Trust, Mount Stewart
  - "'Tess', a Collie in a Landscape" (c. 1910)
- Museum of Modern Art, New York City
- The National Sporting Library and Museum, Middleburg, Virginia

== Death and legacy ==
Paice died in 1925 aged 71 and was buried in the family grave, in Croydon, his racing colours (he had always been interested in racings) draped on his coffin. With his animal portraits present in galleries and museums in England and in the United States at the Museum of Modern Art, New York City, Paice's paintings have been sold at Christie's, Sotheby's, and Bonhams.

Father of eight children, one of his sons followed his father's steps and also became a painter, Philip Stuart Paice (1884–1940) adopting his mother's surname.

== Sources ==
- 4 artworks by or after George Paice at the Art UK site
- Secord, William, Dog Painting--The European Breeds 2000 Antique Collectors Club, pp. 398 ISBN 9781851492381
- Dog Painting 1840-1940 - William Secord
- https://www.nsl.org/
- Dictionary of British Animal Painters - Colonel J C Wood
- The Dictionary of British Equestrian Artists - Sally Mitchell
- The Dictionary of Victorian Painters - Christopher Wood
