= Richard Howard Penton =

English painter (1882–1960)

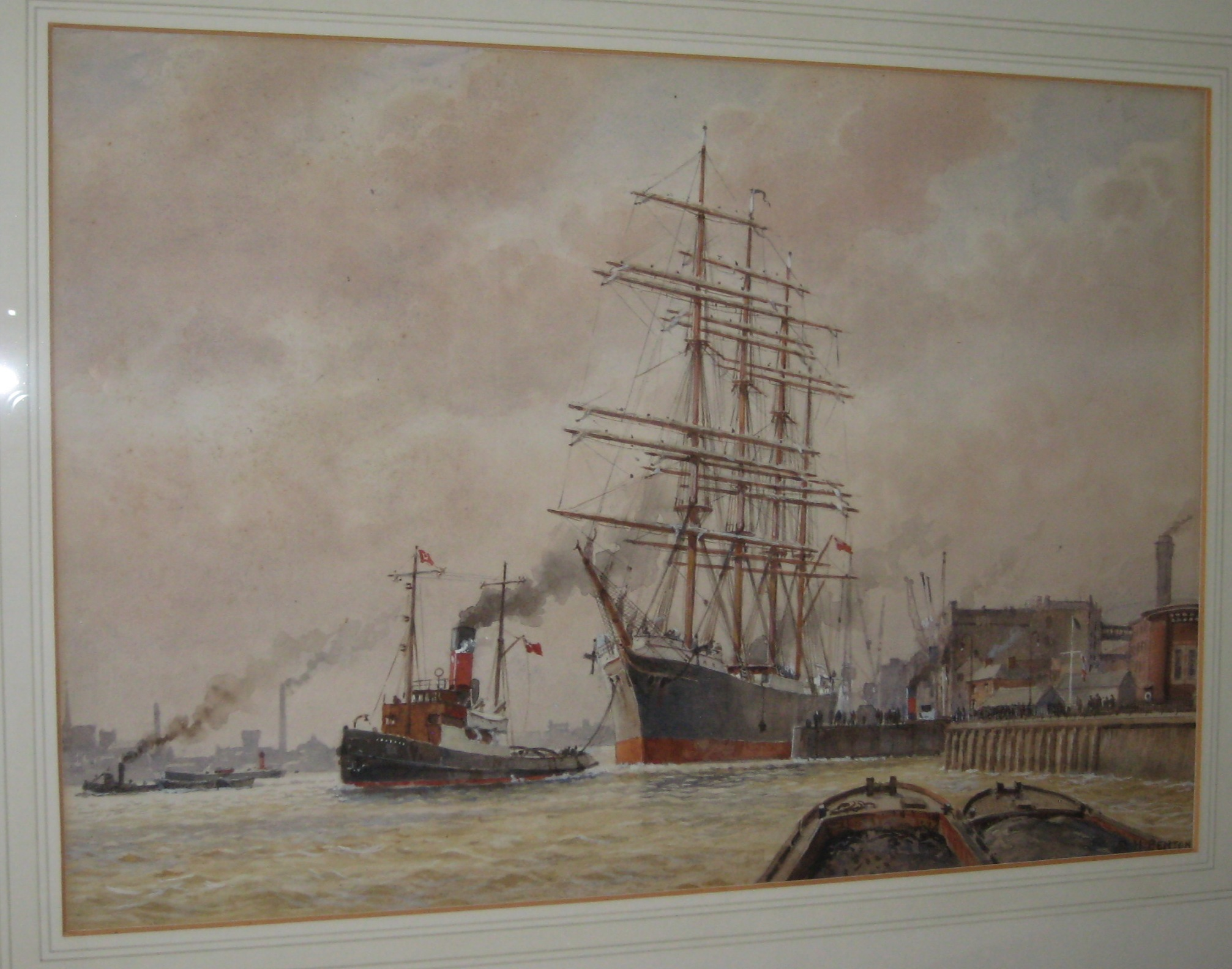
Watercolour dated to about 1949 shows Pamir, a German sail training ship, leaving Wapping in London.

Richard Howard Penton (known professionally as Howard Penton) (1882–1960) was an English marine and landscape painter. He exhibited at the Royal Academy of Arts, the Royal Watercolour Society and the Royal Society of Marine Artists.

Richard Penton was born in 1882, an only child, in Barrow-in-Furness, where his father, Richard Rich Penton, worked for the local Furness Railway Company as a draughtsman and Assistant to the Carriage Superintendent and taught art at the local Art school in Dalton. He was a competent artist from and early age with a fascination for marine subjects. In 1900 he sketched the very discreet launch of the "Mikasa", the Japanese flagship built by Vickers in Barrow, and had his drawing published in the London Daily Graphic. As a result of this coup, he was invited to move to London and did so in 1902. He started his career with commissions for pencil illustrations for several publications such as Picturesque Westminster, Westminster Abbey and Parish Churches, The County of London and The Bridges of London. His drawings in Halls of the Livery Companies of the City of London were re-published in 1981 by the Worshipful Company of Chartered Surveyors to mark their grant of livery status.

Richard Penton served in WW1 in the Sherwood Foresters, surviving the war, and emerging as a Lieutenant (Brevet Captain) in 1919. During that time he continued to draw and paint in France. He went on to become a noted marine and landscape painter, a founder member of the Langham Sketching Club and the Wapping Group of Artists. The London Metropolitan Archives owns the Penton Collection, comprising 130 pencil drawings.

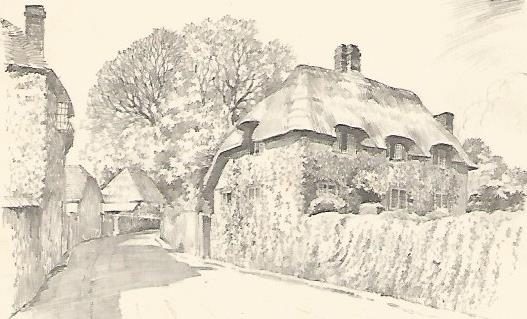
Edward Stott's Cottage by R.H.Penton (Postcard 1930)

He met and married Ciceley Urmson Heinekey in the interwar period. She was an editor and journalist, starting her professional life working with Walter Hutchinson, publisher of literary magazines, later joining Fleetway Publications editing women's magazines throughout WW2. They had two sons—Richard Penton and John Howard Penton—both became practising architects.
