= Helen Mabel Trevor =

Northern Irish landscape and genre painter

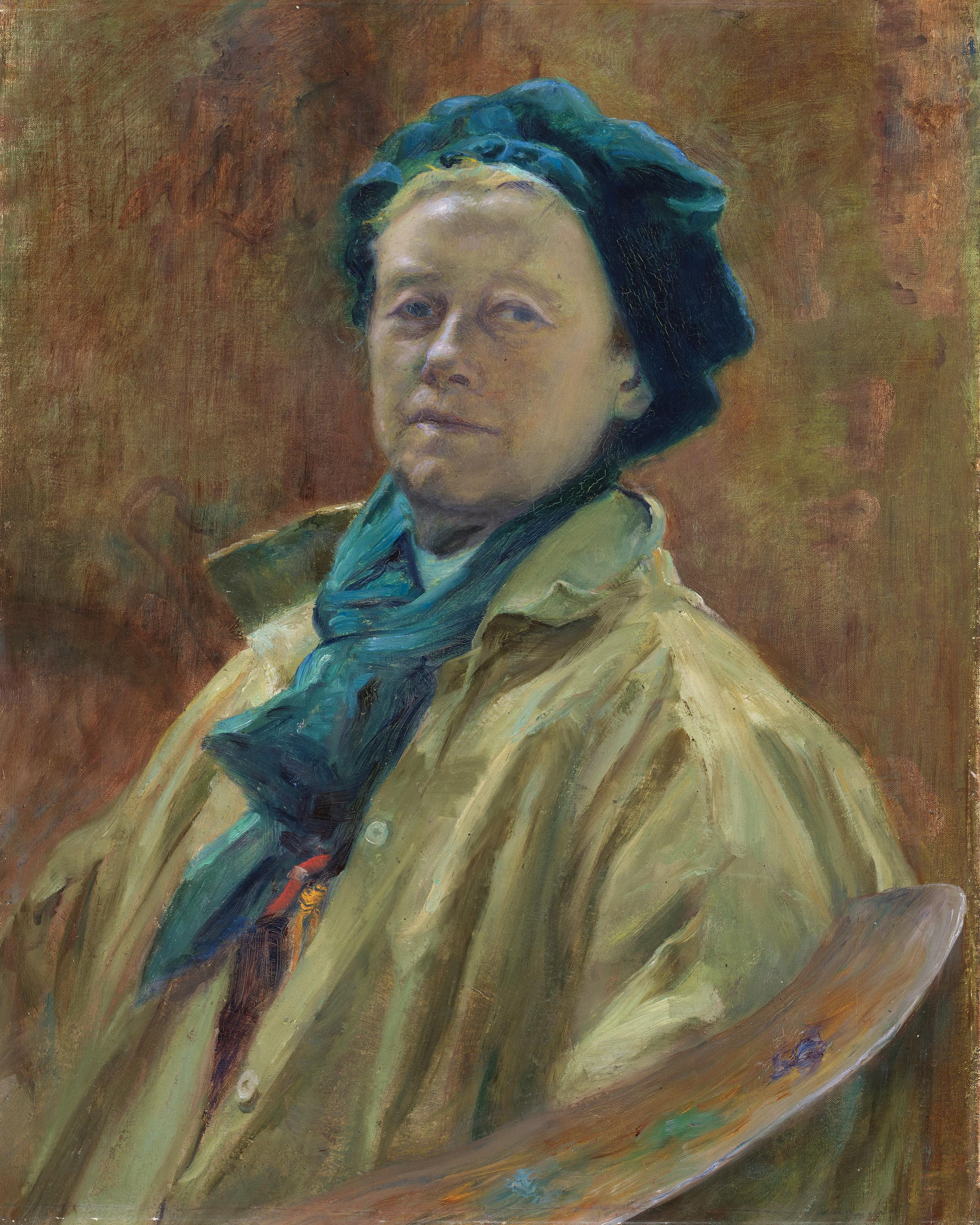
- Helen Mabel Trevor
- Born: 20 December 1831; Lisnagead House, Loughbrickland, County Down
- Died: 3 April 1900 (aged 68); Paris, France
- Education: Royal College of Art London
- Known for: landscape and genre painting
- Style: realism

Helen Mabel Trevor (20 December 1831 – 3 April 1900) was an Irish landscape and genre painter.

== Life ==
Helen Mabel Trevor was born in Lisnagead House, Loughbrickland, County Down, on 20 December 1831. She was the eldest daughter of Edward Hill Trevor, Esq. Trevor began to draw at a young age, with her father providing her with a studio as encouragement. She left Ireland in the 1870s, with the income of the Loughbrickland estate funding her travels and studies until the 1890s. Trevor became deaf later in life, dying suddenly from a heart attack in her studio in Rue du Cherche Midi on 3 April 1900.

== Artistic career ==
In 1853 she sent works to the Dublin Exhibition The Youthful Mechanic and Portrait of William III, submitting to the Royal Hibernian Academy (RHA) in 1854 with Sketch from Life. She went on to submit again to the RHA in 1856 with works depicting a dog, a kitten and the hounds of the Newry Hunt, along with a portrait. In 1858 she submitted two paintings of dogs. Later in the 1870s, following the death of her parents, she attended the Royal Academy of Arts (RA) in London for four years. Around 1880, Trevor moved to Paris and studied with Jean-Jacques Henner, Luc-Olivier Merson, and Carolus-Duran. She travelled with her sister Rose to Brittany and Normandy in 1881 and 1882. Her 1881 painting, Breton boys en retenue, was sent to the RA. Another work, Two Breton girls, probably dates from this time. Trevor starts to exhibit more realism with her 1883 piece A Breton widow, which was shown with the RHA in 1889. She spent time in Concarneau in 1883, where she possibly met the realist Jules Bastien-Lepage. The sisters moved to Italy in 1883, and stayed there for the next six years travelling and studying the Old Masters. Trevor continued to exhibit with the RHA, with 1888 works such as The hills of Perugia and Venetian beadstringers.

Trevor returned to Paris in 1889, and resumed work with Carolus-Duran. She would visit Brittany continuously over this period, but she remained in Paris for the rest of her life at a number of addresses. In 1889, 1893 and 1899 she was exhibited at the Paris Salon. Trevor remarked at her drop in rental income from her Irish property, but remained positive about her circumstances. Her 1898 work, Breton interior received an honourable mention. From 1889 to 1897, fourteen of her works were sent to the RHA, with others sent to the RA. An example of her later work are La mère du marin from 1892, which is reminiscent of Old woman gathering leaves (1887) by Frank O'Meara, a fellow pupil of Duran. She showed with the Royal Society of British Artists in 1889 with a painting of the Reverend Canon Green.

Trevor bequeathed two paintings to the National Gallery of Ireland (NGI), The Fisherman's Mother and Interior of a Breton Cottage, with her sister later donating a third, a self-portrait. In 1959, the Ulster Museum purchased The young Eve (1882). Her letters to a friend, E. Halse, were published in 1901 under the title Ramblings of an artist. She was featured in the 1974 NGI exhibition, The Centenary of Impressionism: Nineteenth Century French Art and Ireland.
