= James Peel =

English painter

James Peel (1 July 1811 – 28 January 1906) was an English landscape painter.

== Early life and education ==
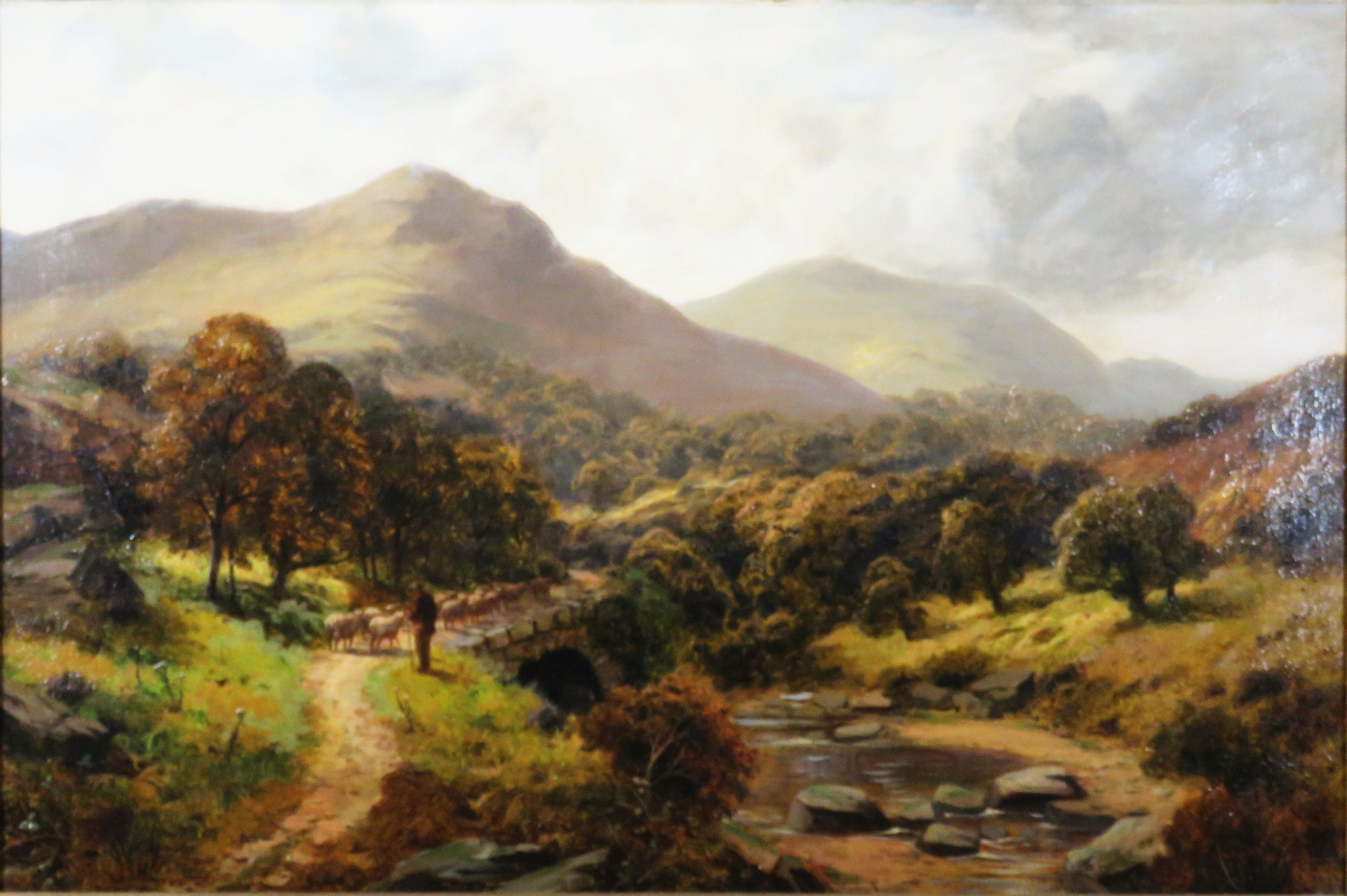
Sheep in the Scottish highlands (oil on canvas)

Born on 1 July 1811 in Westage Road, Newcastle-on-Tyne, he was the son of Thomas Peel, woollen draper (d. 24 April 1822), partner in the firm of Fenwick, Reid & Co. Educated at Bruce's school, he had as schoolfellows there Sir Charles Mark Palmer and John Collingwood Bruce, the antiquary. Alexander Dalziel (1781 - 1832), father of the wood engravers the Dalziel Brothers, first taught him drawing, and in 1840 he came to London to paint portraits.

== Biography ==
Among his early work were full-sized copies of Wilkie's 'Blind Fiddler' and 'The Village Festival,' in the National Gallery, as well as portraits and miniatures. Eventually he confined himself wholly to landscape painting, in which he exhibited at the Royal Academy from 1843 to 1888 and at the Royal Society of British Artists from 1845 onwards.

His pictures made their mark by their sincere feeling for nature and their excellent drawing, especially of trees. Three of his pictures, 'A Lane in Berwickshire,' 'Cotherstone, Yorkshire,' and 'Pont-y-pant, Wales,' are in the Laing Art Gallery, Newcastle, where a loan exhibition of his works was held in 1907. Several were bought for other provincial galleries at Glasgow, Leeds, and Sunderland, and for clients in Newcastle. He resided at Darlington from 1848 to 1857, when he again settled in London.

In 1861 he was admitted a member of the Royal Society of British Artists, of which he became a leading supporter. With Ford Madox Brown, William Bell Scott and other artists he was an organiser of "free" exhibitions like those of the Dudley Gallery and of the Portland Gallery, of which the latter ended disastrously. Working to the end, he died at his residence, Elms Lodge, Oxford Road, Reading, on 28 January 1906. Peel married at Darlington, on 30 May 1849, Sarah Martha, eldest daughter of Thomas Blyth, and left children.
