= Madge Oliver =

English painter (1875-1924)

- Born: 18 September 1875; Knaresborough, Yorkshire
- Died: 11 September 1924 (aged 48); Corsica
- Education: Slade School of Art
- Known for: Painting

Madge Oliver (18 September 1875 – 11 September 1924) was a British artist who painted interiors and landscapes. She lived and worked in France for many years.

== Biography ==
Oliver was born in Knaresborough in Yorkshire and studied at the Slade School of Art in London from 1894 to 1897. Oliver won a Slade scholarship in 1896 with the other winner that year being Augustus John. Oliver moved to France in 1910 and settled in Cassis near Marseille. She was decorated for her service during World War One.

Oliver mainly painted interiors but also figures and landscapes, mainly of France. She had a solo exhibition in Paris at the Druet Gallery in 1924. Oliver died on Corsica and a memorial exhibition, with a catalogue introduction written by Ethel Walker, for her was held at the Leger Galleries in London during June and July 1935. The Tate acquired two paintings by Oliver, both showing views from her studio in Cassis, from the 1935 exhibition.
