= Cecil Kennedy =

British painter

Cecil Kennedy (4 February 1905, Leyton – 12 December 1997, St Albans), was a British artist best known for his highly detailed oil paintings of flowers. He was also wont to include a ladybug or a bumblebee in his pictures.

Cecil Kennedy's obituary can be found in The Independent, and cuded.
