= Louise Pickard =

English painter

Louise Pickard (12 December 1865 – 6 June 1928) was an English painter of still life, landscapes and portraits.

== Biography ==
Pickard was born in Kingston upon Hull and studied at the Slade School of Art in London between 1898 and 1900 and then studied sculpture in Paris for a time. She exhibited at the Royal Academy on eight occasions between 1909 and her death in 1928. Pickard exhibited at the New English Art Club for the first time in 1909 and became a member in 1923. She also exhibited with the International Society of Sculptors, Painters and Gravers. In January 1924 the Goupil Gallery in London held a joint exhibition by Charles Ginner, Ethel Walker and Pickard.

For many years Pickard had a studio in Chelsea in London and also worked on both the French Riviera and in North Yorkshire for a time. Her paintings are in the collections of several museums and galleries in the United Kingdom, including the Ferens Art Gallery, Cartwright Hall and the Tate. She died in London and the Alpine Club Gallery held a memorial exhibition for Pickard in 1928.
