= Eric Rimmington =

British artist (1926–2024)

- Rimmington in 2006
- Born: 19 July 1926; Portsmouth, Hampshire, England
- Died: 3 November 2024 (aged 98); England
- Education: Southern Secondary School for Boys; Southern Art College
- Alma mater: Slade School of Fine Art
- Known for: Still life; murals; draughtsmanship
- Notable work: Trafalgar House Mural (1949).; The Return of the Prodigal Son (1962).
- Style: Figurative art; Post-Impressionism
- Spouses: Margaret McVey; Mary Michaels

Eric Oliver Rimmington (19 July 1926 – 3 November 2024) was an English painter of still lifes, landscapes and murals. He served in the military in the Second World War, studied at the Slade School of Fine Art, and taught art at various establishments in England and the United States. He exhibited his paintings at many venues, and has numerous works in public collections. He is best known for his mural in the Trafalgar public house, Portsmouth, which influenced English Heritage in listing the building.

== Background ==
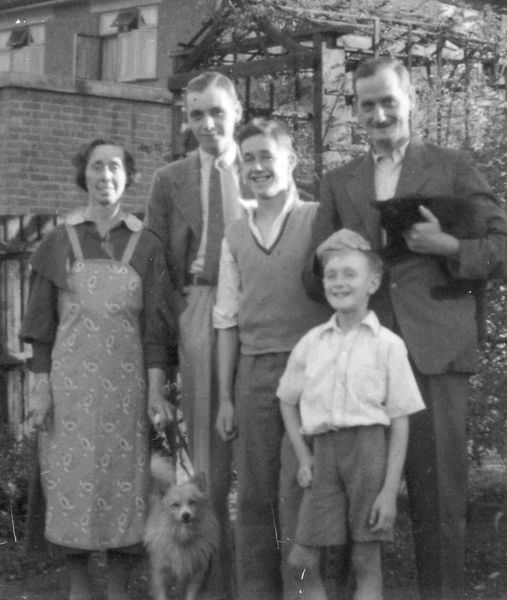
Rimmington's family, 1932

Rimmington was born in Portsmouth, Hampshire. (Note: Eric Oliver Rimmington (19 June 1926 – 3 November 2024). GRO index: Births Sep 1926 Rimmington Eric Oliver, mother Bowman, Portsmouth 2b 608.) His father was Charlie Rimmington senior, an engine room artificer who served in the Royal Navy in the First World War, (Note: Charlie Rimmington senior (26 December 1889 – 12 October 1969). GRO index: Births Mar 1890 Rimmington Charlie Portsea 2b 509. Deaths Dec 1969 Rimmington Charlie 26 De 1889 Portsmouth 6b 1339. Note that "Charlie" was a given name in this family, i.e. not a diminutive.) and his mother was seamstress Mabel Bowman. (Note: Mabel Rimmington née Bowman (c. 1888 – 1964) GRO index: Marriages Dec 1913 Rimmington Charlie and Bowman Mabel, Portsmouth 2b 953. Deaths Sep 1964 Rimmington Mabel 76 Portsmouth 6B 426.) He was the youngest of three brothers. The eldest was Charlie Rimmington junior, of the Royal Navy, (Note: Charlie Rimmington junior (20 November 1914 – 21 July 1987) GRO index: Births Dec 1914 Rimmington Charlie, mother Bowman, Paddington 1a 117.) who was mentioned in dispatches in the 1944 Birthday Honours. The middle brother was Ronald N. Rimmington. (Note: Ronald N. Rimmington (1919–1996). GRO index: Births Mar 1919 Rimmington Ronald N., mother Bowman, Portsmouth 2b 606. Marriages Dec 1941 Rimmington Ronald N. and Edith Jones, Portsmouth 2b 1325.) Eric Rimmington was educated at Southern Secondary School for Boys and Southern Art College. However, before he could complete his studies, he was recruited as a cadet into the Dorset Regiment during the Second World War, serving in the Far East, and becoming second lieutenant on 14 October 1945. After the war, he completed his studies, and earned a fine art diploma in 1952 at the Slade School of Fine Art.

Rimmington married Margaret McVey in 1947 and they had a daughter, but the marriage ended in the 1960s or 1970s. While working at Wolverhampton he formed a partnership with Mary Michaels, a history of art teacher at the same establishment, and they married in 1994. He died on 3 November 2024.

== Career ==
Rimmington was a still life artist, and a draughtsman who used graphite and pencil. Art critic William Packer said that he was "one of our most distinguished exponents of still life". The Trafalgar public house, or the former Trafalgar House Services Club in Portsmouth, was Grade II listed in 2002 for its mural, executed between 1948 and 1949 by Rimmington when he was 23 years old. The mural covers the whole of one wall of a downstairs back room. The listing says:

The principal interest of the building is a painted mural ... painted in 1948 by Eric Rimmington.The work is of considerable interest as an example of public mural painting of the immediate post-Second World War period, with its allusions to the War and local references to the naval base of Portsmouth, by an interesting young artist.

While continuing with his own painting, Rimmington was employed as an art teacher. He taught at Scarborough College of Art between 1952 and 1958, and at Bradford College of Art from 1958 to 1966. He was a senior lecturer in art between 1966 and 1969 at Birmingham College of Art and Design. He was then hired at Wolverhampton Polytechnic as senior course tutor and principal lecturer between 1969 and 1982. Around 1982–1983, he taught for a year at the University of Wisconsin–Stout in the United States. Mary Michaels said that in Wisconsin, "Eric found an atmosphere refreshingly free of the prescriptive attitudes that dominated the British art world". He returned to Worcester and then Hackney, and proceeded to work as a still life artist.

== Exhibitions ==
Over thirty years from the 1980s, Rimmington contributed to a large number of group exhibitions, and had thirty exhibitions of his own work. He exhibited at the Millinery Works, Islington, the Bohun Gallery, Henley-on-Thames, and the Mercury Gallery, Cork Street, London. The 2012 Millinery Works exhibition featured forty paintings of the London Underground, created between 2006 and 2011. In 2014 the Bohun Gallery featured an exhibition of Rimmington's still-lifes.

== Collections ==
Rimmington's works are held in a number of public collections, including the Gulbenkian Foundation, the Imperial War Museum, Bradford City Art Gallery, the University of Wisconsin–Madison, Reading Museum and Art Gallery, the University of Leeds, Scarborough Art Gallery and the ING Collection in the Museum of London.
