= Walter Daniel Batley =

English painter (1850-1936)

- Born: Walter Daniel Batley; 1850; Ipswich
- Died: 29 September 1936 (aged 85–86); Ipswich
- Known for: Painter
- Movement: Naturalism

Walter Daniel Batley (1850 – 29 September 1936) was a Suffolk artist based in Ipswich. After receiving his art education, he painted some portraits but landscapes soon became his preferred subject. He exhibited at several venues in England and also in Paris. Batley regularly submitted work to the Royal Academy, and he was a founding member of the Ipswich Fine Art Club. He enjoyed travelling and painting throughout England, although East Anglia remained his favourite locale. Starting in the 1890s, his method of painting evolved towards a freer and more atmospheric style. His work is held in three public collections, and a retrospective was mounted in 1988 at Christchurch Mansion.

== Early life ==
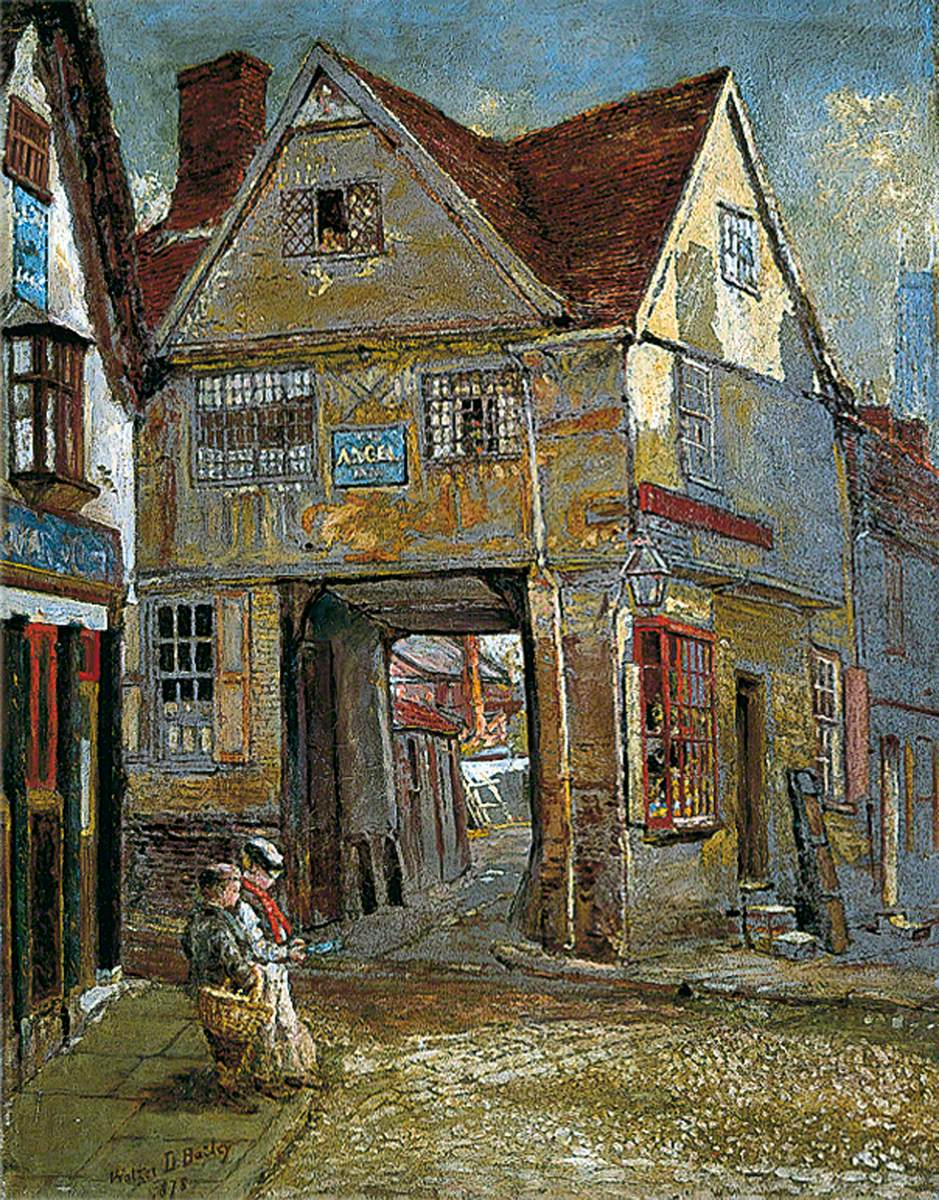
Angel Corner, Ipswich. 1878.

Walter Daniel Batley was born in 1850, the second son of a house decorator. As a result of catching smallpox as a boy, Walter and his mother moved to Felixstowe in 1860, while still maintaining a home in Ipswich. He studied at the Ipswich School of Art from 1868 to 1873, a classmate of Frederick George Cotman and William Robert Symonds. He left to continue his education at South Kensington and the Royal Academy Schools in London.

In 1874, he was one of nine artists selected to copy the Raphael Cartoons. During the same year he won South Kensington's gold medal for a black and white drawing based on an antique cast figure. In 1878, he married Catherine (Katie) Emily Bird in Ipswich, where they settled. The couple had five children together.

== Career ==
Although he produced some early portraits, Batley soon showed a preference for landscapes. Starting in 1874, he exhibited or sent work regularly to the Royal Academy, continuing this practice until at least the 1910s. Other locales where his work was shown include the Walker Art Gallery in Liverpool, the Manchester City Art Gallery, and the Royal Society of British Artists. He also exhibited occasionally at the New English Art Club in London and the Paris Salon. He was a founding member of the Ipswich Fine Art Club, where he exhibited from 1874 until 1935. In its inaugural exhibition he showed several town and cityscapes. Batley's work was successful and sold well in Ipswich. In likely his only trip abroad, he travelled to Switzerland in 1882, exhibiting four Swiss mountain landscapes after his return. During the same year, he had a particular success at the Royal Academy, for a painting entitled "The Old Craig Pit", located outside Ipswich. The work was described as "among the most artistic landscapes here". Batley made a short-lived foray into genre scenes, seen in the 1884 painting His First Vote. He contributed to the Woodbridge Fine Art Club, where he won a first prize in 1887 for oil colours.

He made occasional trips to Cornwall, Yorkshire, and Derbyshire. However, it was the quality of the light and skies of East Anglia which were best represented in his landscapes. By the 1890s, while demonstrating a greater feeling for atmosphere, Batley began applying his paint with greater vigour and freedom. In his 1897 painting Minsmere Cliff, the landscape is reduced to its elements, recording the reflected sunlight on the open shore.

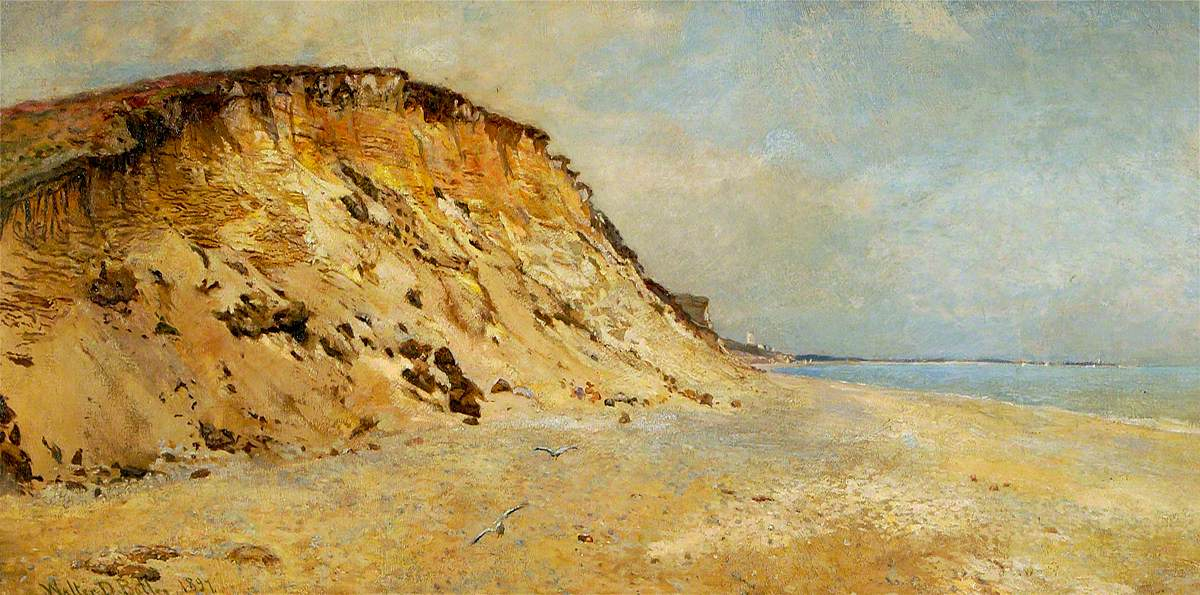
Minsmere Cliff, Dunwich. 1897.

Batley and his family moved in 1898 to Rushmere St Andrew, living in a farmhouse they called 'Little Roundwood'. The surrounding trees and cottages became his favourite subjects. Despite being in his sixties, during the First World War he volunteered for patrol duty. In these years, his recognition of the more contemporary freer style began to outpace the increasingly dated Royal Academy, where he had a few rejections. A successful operation in 1919 restored his failing eyesight due to glaucoma. With most of their children overseas, in 1921 Batley and his wife settled in Felixstowe, where the rivers and sea provided new subjects for Batley. Some noteworthy pieces resulted from a trip to Sark of the Channel Islands. In 1928, the Batleys moved their residence again to Ipswich. In 1932, Batley showed at the Norfolk & Norwich Art Circle. He was given an honorary exhibition at the Wolsey Art Gallery in 1935. Batley died on 29 September 1936, while convalescing after a major operation. His wife followed three years later.

Batley was a popular Suffolk artist, known for the warmth of his colour, fine execution, and diversity of subject. He won praise from the artist Stanhope Forbes, and was described as having a "genius for landscape work".

== Collections ==
Batley's works are held at Christchurch Mansion, Ipswich Borough Council Collection, and Leeds Art Gallery. A major retrospective of his artwork was held at Christchurch Mansion in 1988.

== Gallery ==
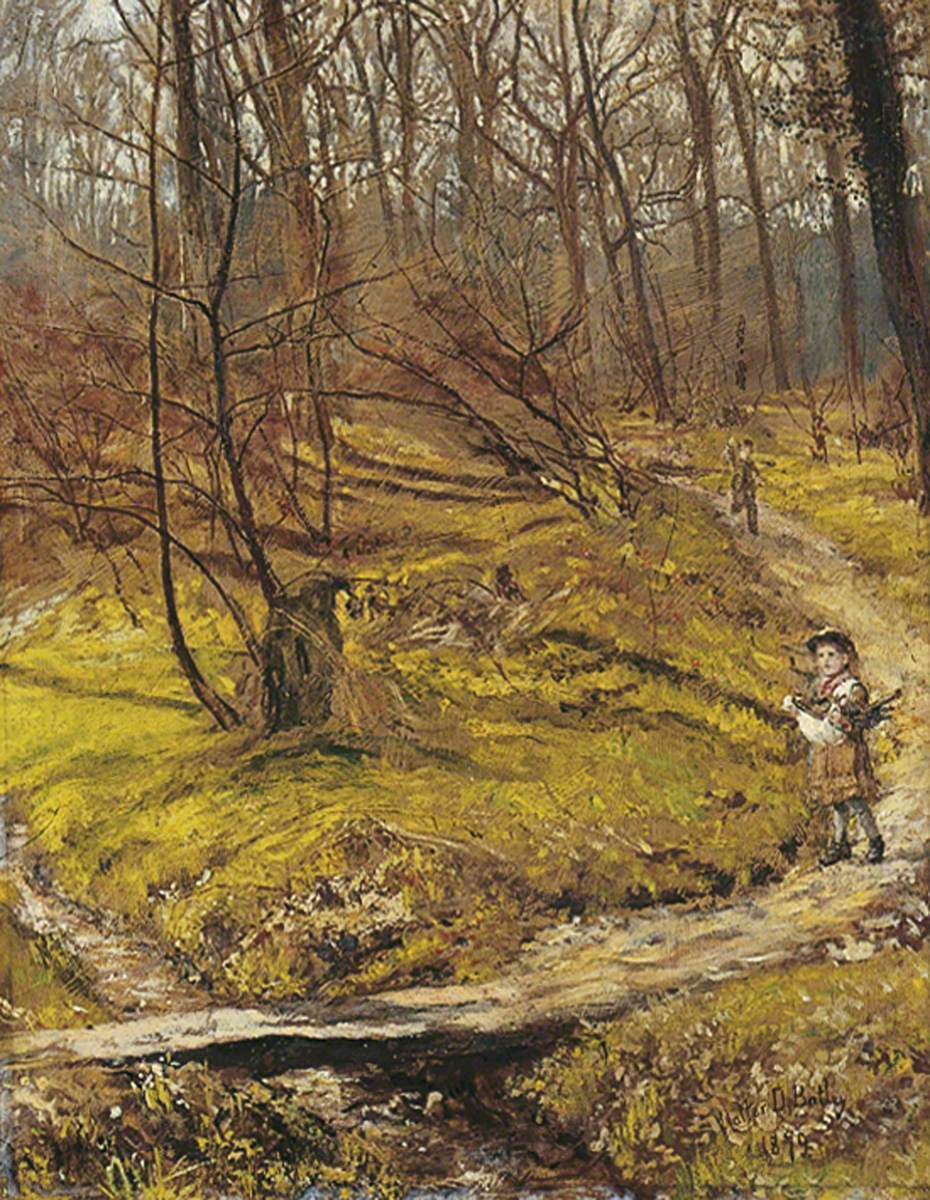
Children Gathering Wood. 1879.

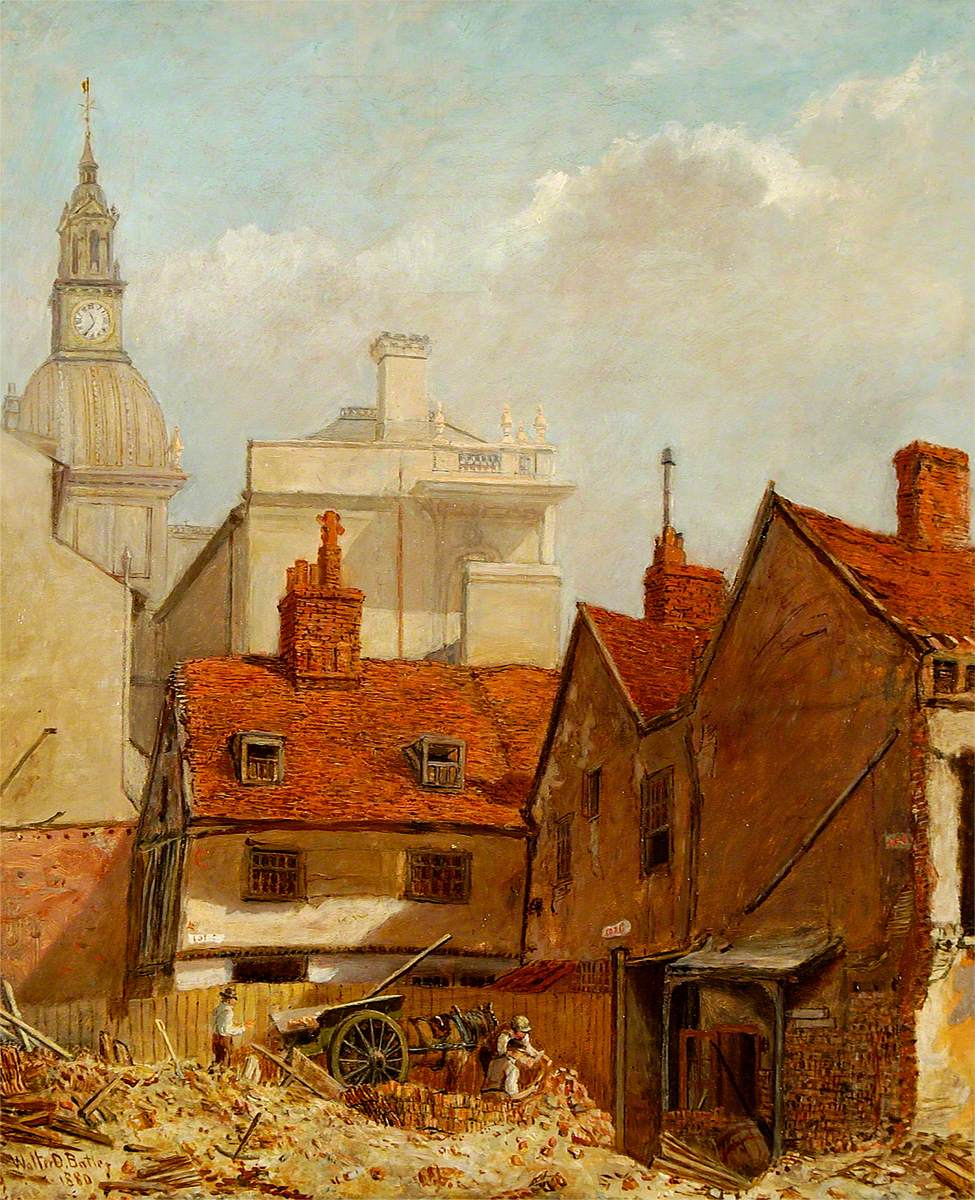
Demolition, Back of the Town Hall, Ipswich. 1880.

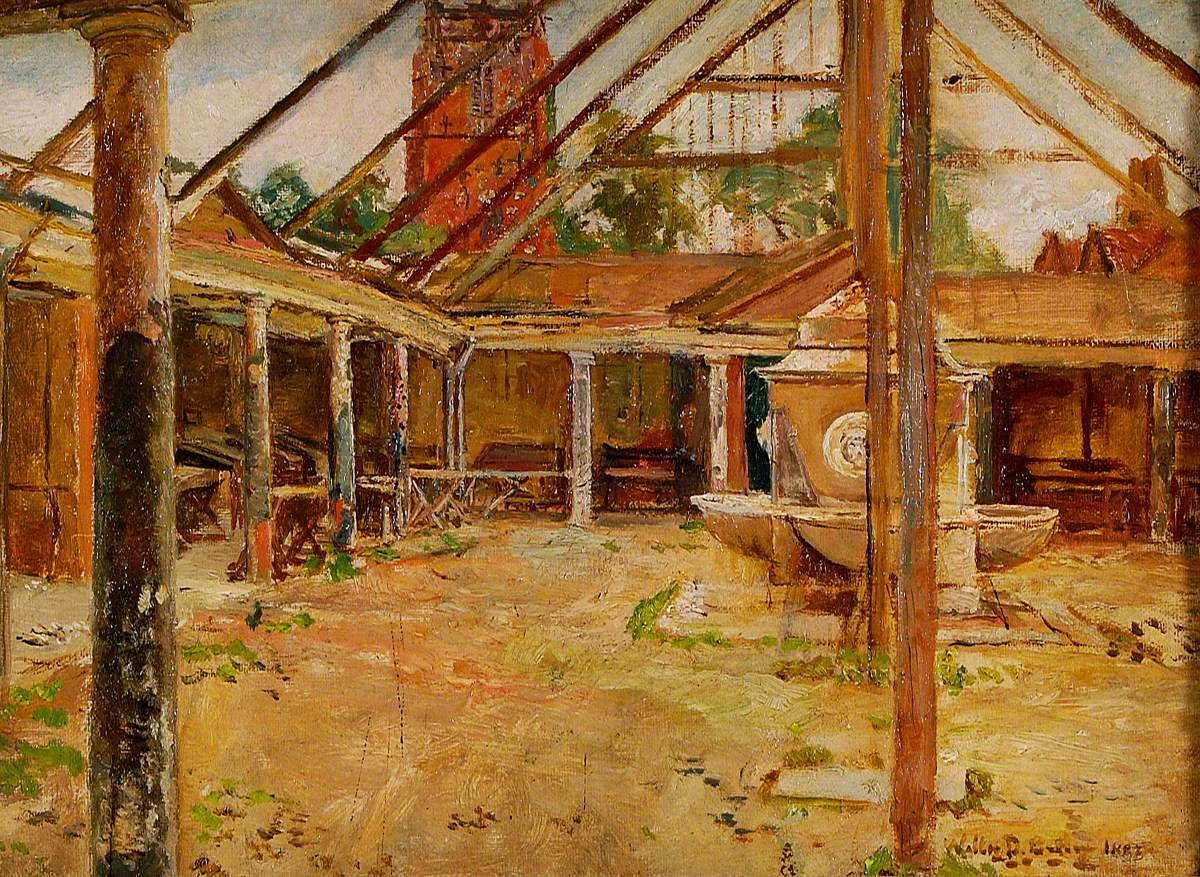
Old Provision Market, Ipswich. 1882.

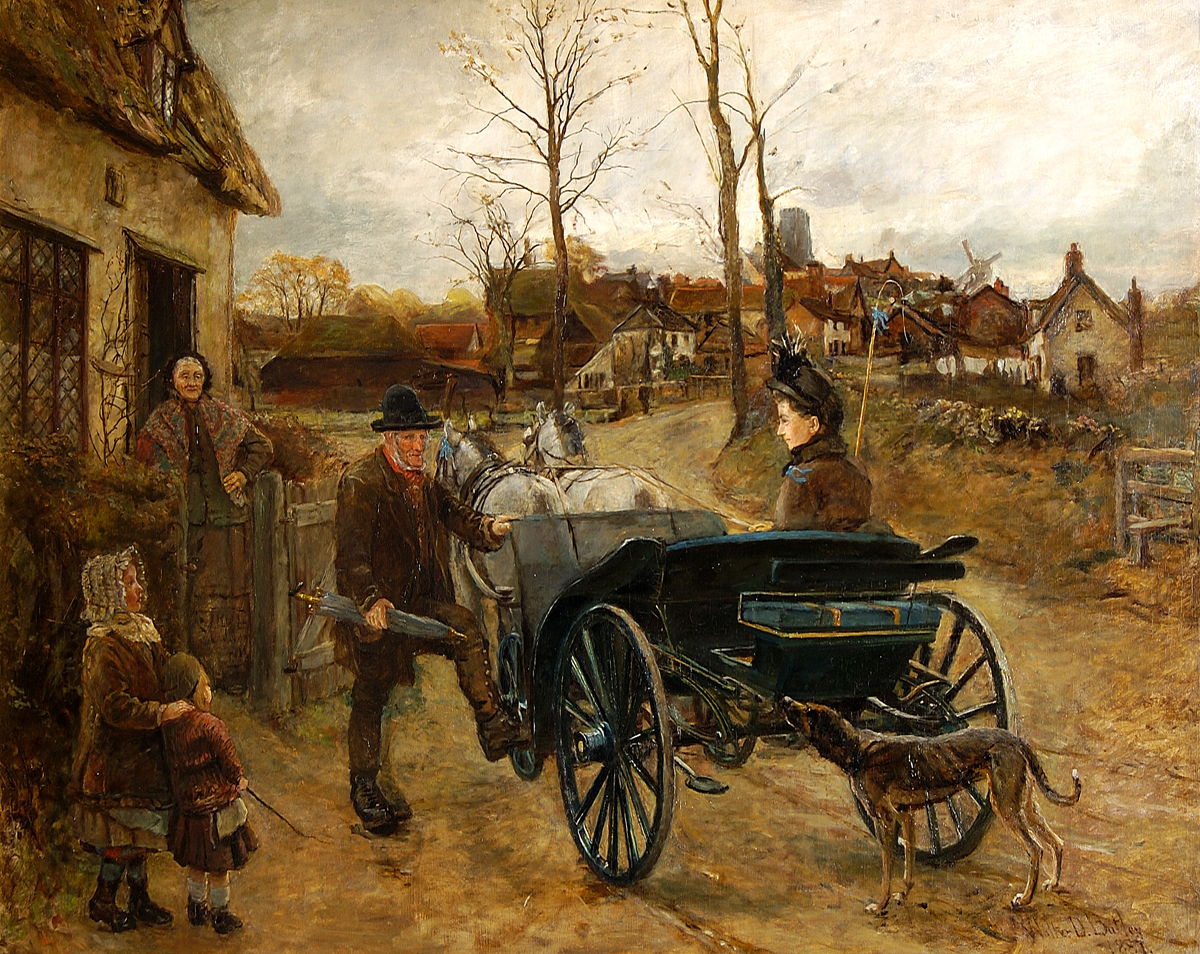
His First Vote. 1884.

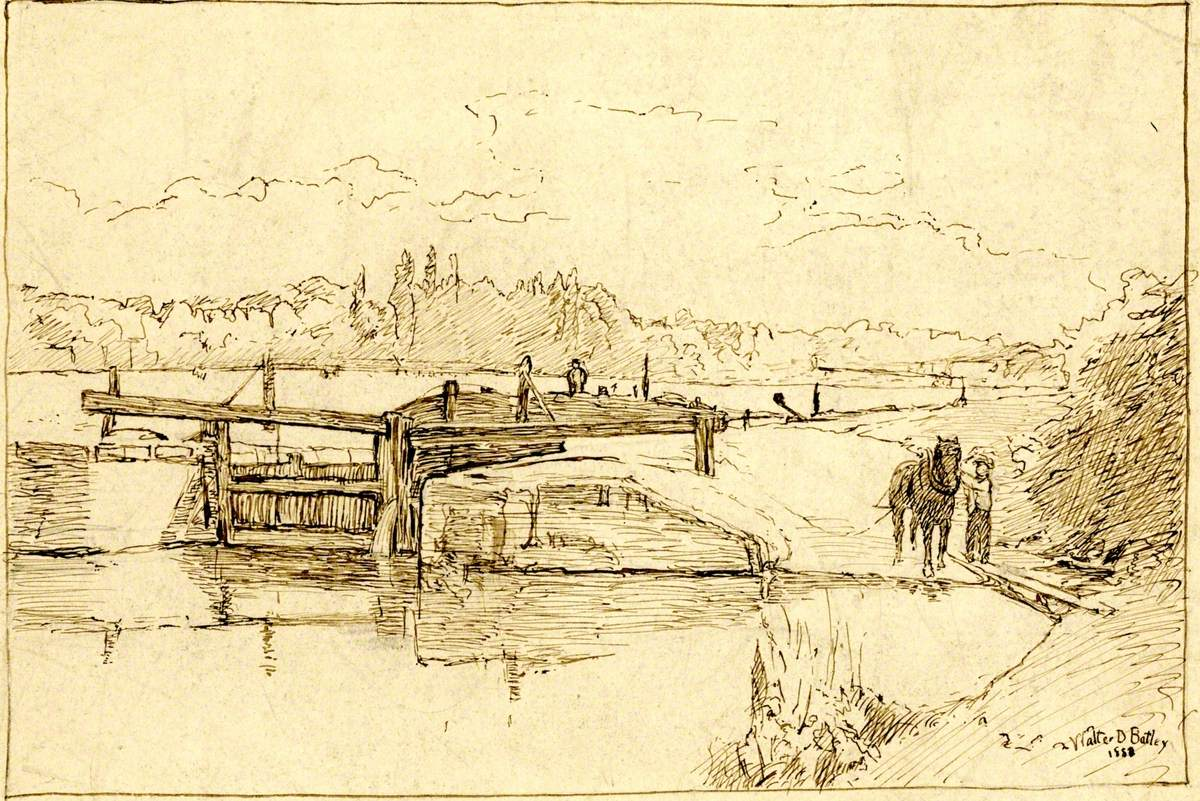
Chantry Lock. 1888.

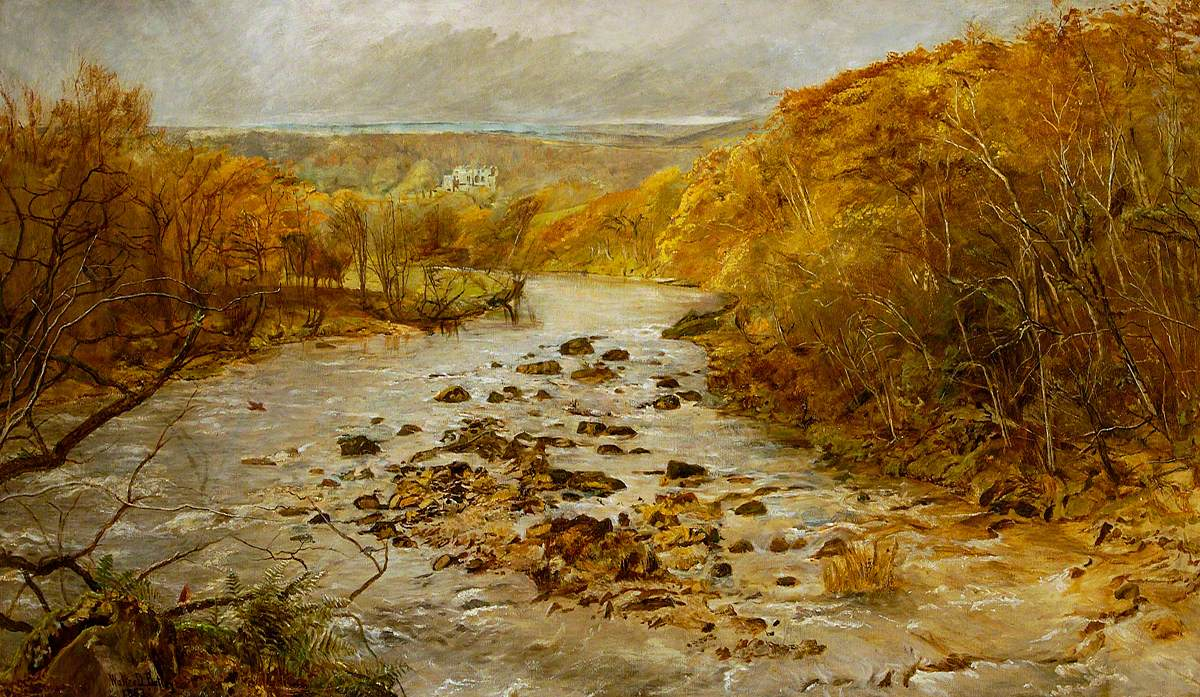
Wharfedale. 1888.

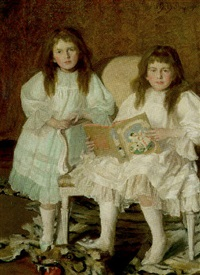
Dorothy and Lorna Bell. 1890s.

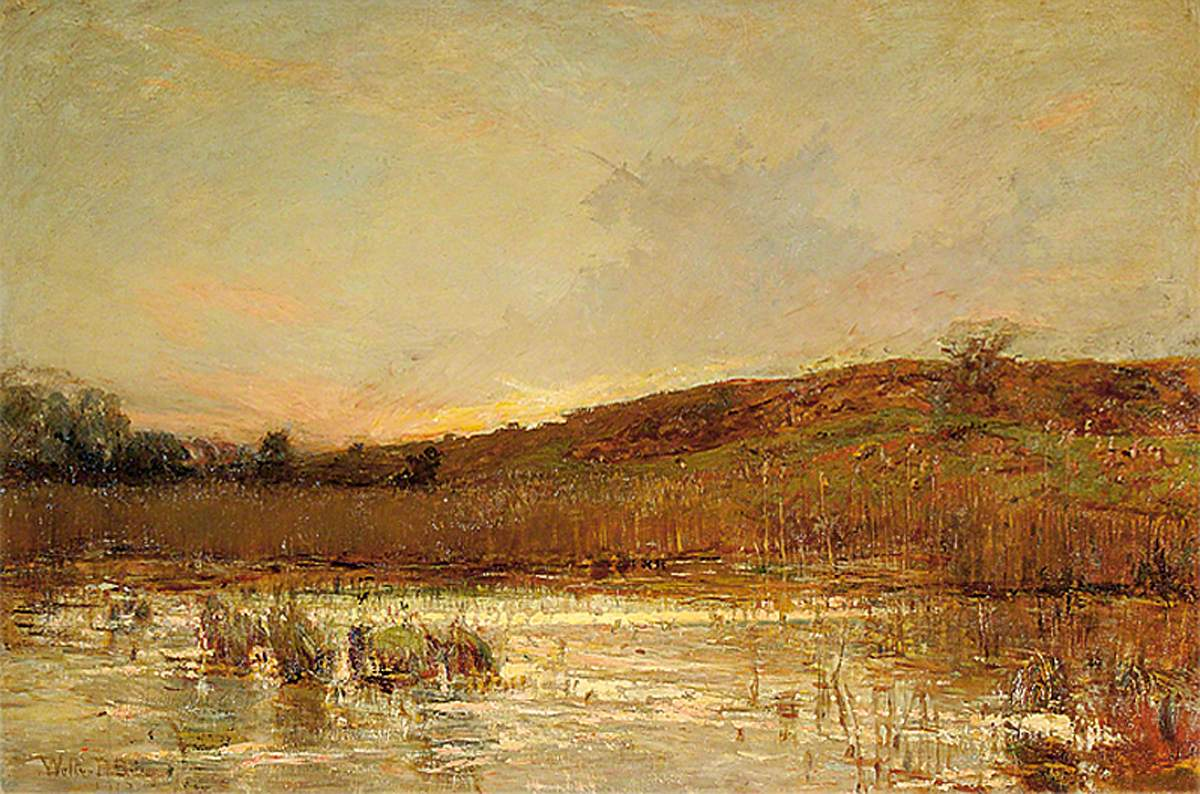
Now Comes Still Evening on. 1913.

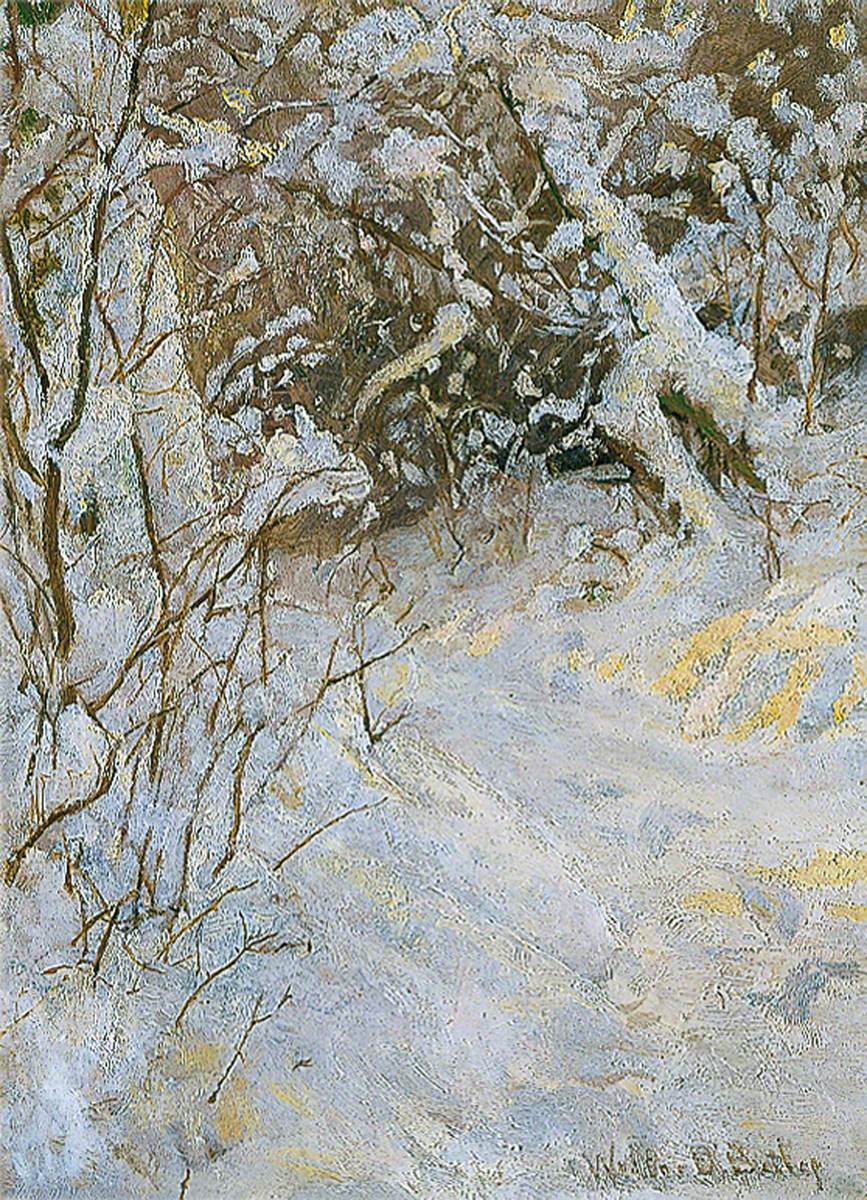
Snow. c. 1915.

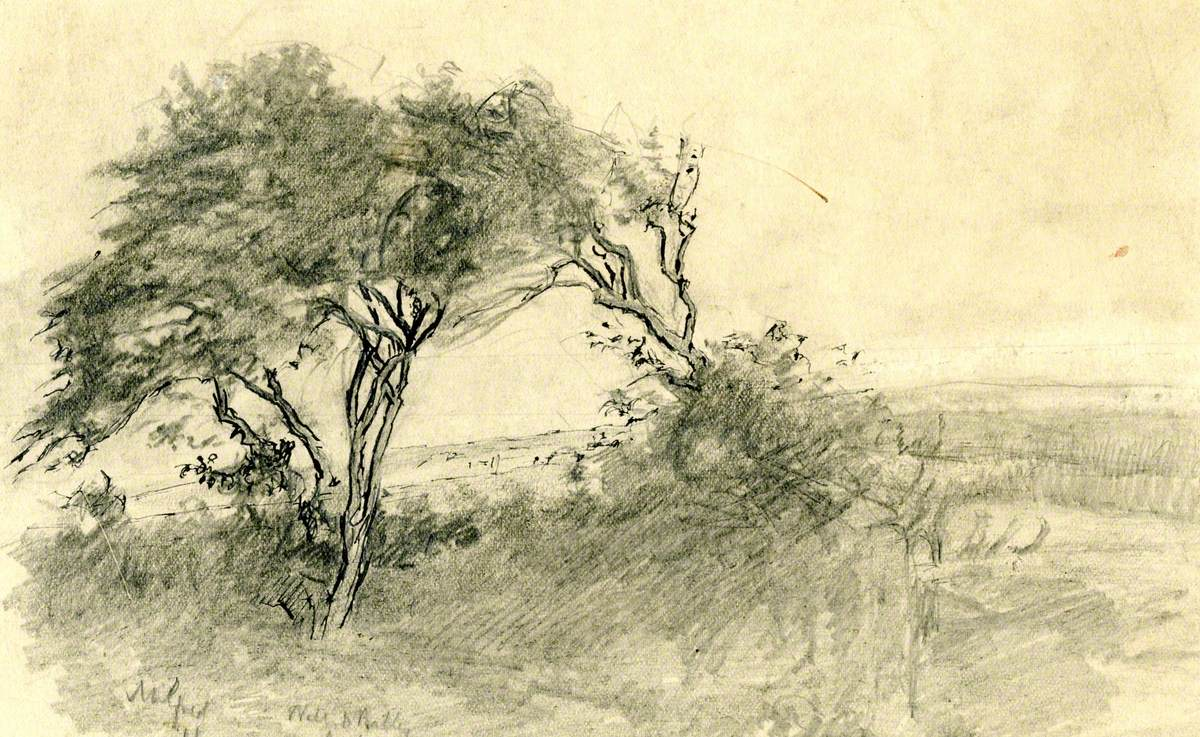
Milford, Hampshire. 1918.
