= Braaq =

English painter

Brian Shields at work.

Pencil on Paper Self Portrait of the artist as a boy - showing his ubiquitous Striped Top

Brian Shields (1951–1997) was a Liverpool-born English painter. He is best known for painting industrial scenes of northern Britain. He acquired the nickname "Braaq" in his school days — on account of his artistic talent he was nicknamed "Braque" after the French artist Georges Braque.

He held his first exhibition in 1974. In 1977 he was invited to hold four exhibitions in London and at this time was described by The Times as "one of the six most successful artists in England."

He died of a brain haemorrhage.
