= Edith Gittins =

English artist and social reformer

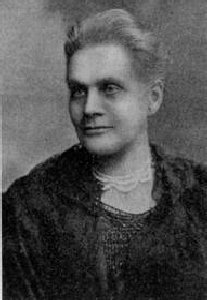
- Born: 1845; Leicester, England
- Died: 1910 (aged 64–65)

Edith Gittins (1845 – 7 August 1910) was an English artist and social reformer, actively involved in promoting women's rights. She was a founder of the Leicester Women’s Liberal Association in 1886 and supported the Leicester Women’s Suffrage Society. She was a watercolour artist trained by William Morris and a member of the Leicester Society of Artists.

== Biography ==
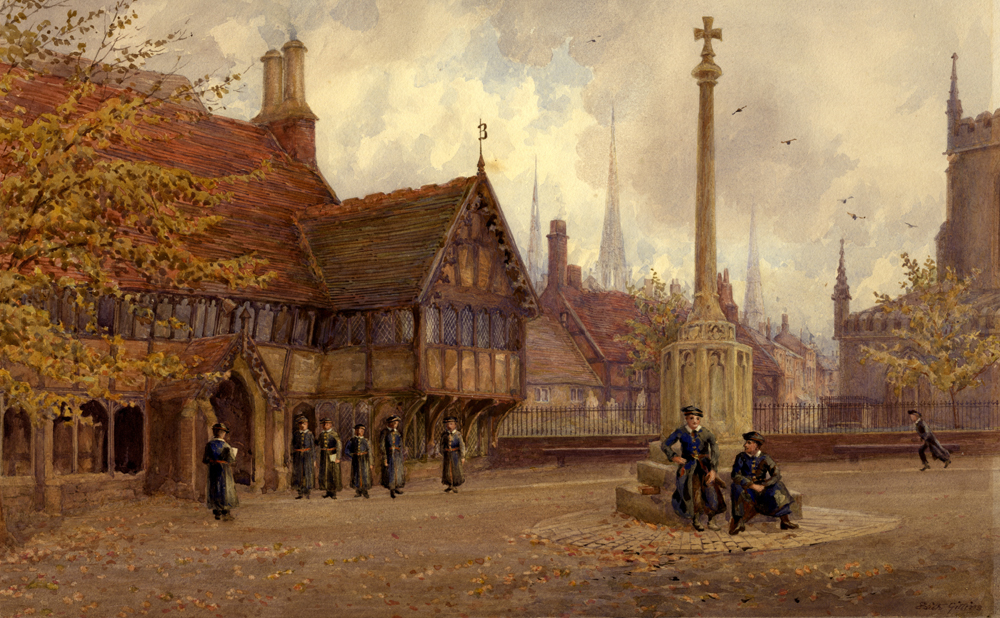
A watercolour of Bablake School, Coventry by Edith Gittins

Gittins was born in Leicester in 1845, the daughter of a woolstapler, Edward Gittins, and the third of five children. She was educated by Miss Drayton, many of whose pupils became prominent women of Leicester. She was an active member of the Unitarian Great Meeting Chapel, teaching in the Sunday School for over forty years. A watercolour artist and drawing teacher, she exhibited several landscape paintings at the Royal Academy and the New Walk Museum and Art Gallery, Leicester, holds several of her watercolours. Gittins helped to found a local branch of the Kyrle Society, a national organisation established in 1877 with the aim of bringing art, books and open spaces to the working class poor, under the slogan 'Bring beauty home to the people'. Strongly committed to women's suffrage, in 1886 she was a founding member of the Leicester Women's Liberal Association. She was on the committee of the Leicester Women's Suffrage Society, formed in 1887, a member of the Leicester branch of National Union of Women Workers and of Leicester Secular Society.

Gittins joined The Joint Women's Franchise Demonstration in February 1907, to mark the opening of the Houses of Parliament. Organised by the National Union of Women's Suffrage Societies (NUWSS), over 3000 women took part in what became known as the Mud March. In June 1908, she joined 10,000 women in the parade in London, later writing in the Leicester Pioneer, "Brains, character, indispensable service these women give, but they are unrepresented in Parliament; they are voteless, governed and taxed without their consent ... In its place ... floats the Leicester banner of purple and crimson, between those of Leeds and Liverpool. We pass between two living walls of interested, curious, 'chaffing' cheering humanity - 'the superior sex'...It is this thought, this hope, this confidence that we are nearing the goal at last, after so many weary years of struggle and contention, that makes today’s demonstration different from those preceding it".

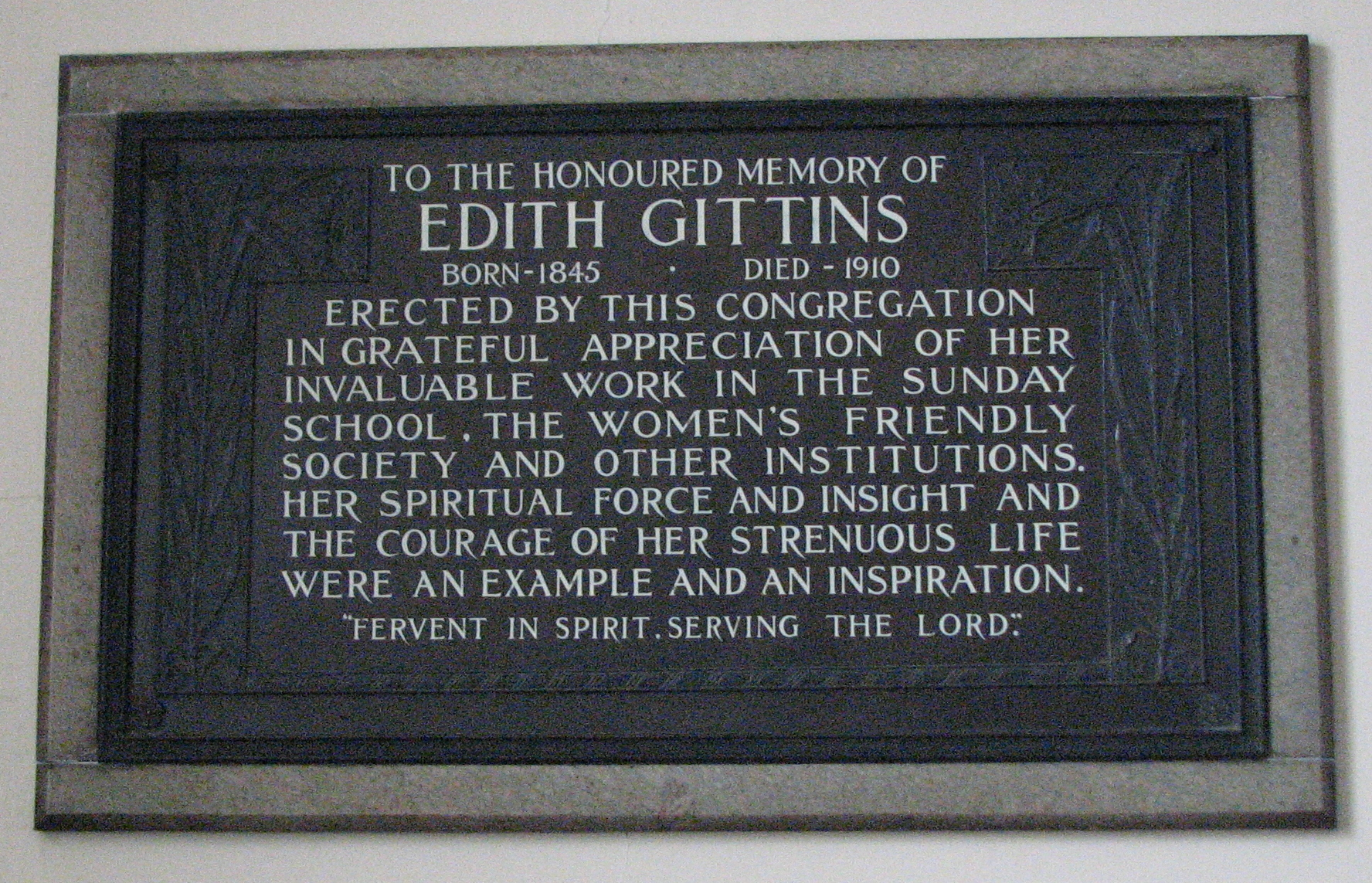
Memorial tablet to Edith Gittins on the wall of the Great Meeting Unitarian Chapel, Leicester.

Gittins was on the executive of the Leicester branch of the National Union of Women Workers which in 1908 protested at men convicted of violence against women receiving light sentences compared to those convicted of crimes against property.

Gittins died in 1910, leaving her large fortune to nieces and nephews as well as local causes. Leicester Domestic Mission was given £200 to be invested for "giving sick and convalescent aid to… or training my former Sunday School Girls". £500 was given to the Treasurer of the Borough of Leicester to build a public drinking fountain, to be called 'Ethelfloeda's Fountain' and intended to be placed at the junction of High Street and Silver Street, though subsequently erected in Victoria Park, Leicester in 1922. A bronze statue of Ethelfloeda, surmounting the fountain was stolen in 1978, and after further vandalism, the replacement statue and the upper section of the fountain were moved initially to the City Rooms in Hotel Street and are now in the courtyard of Leicester Guildhall.
