= Paul Cranfield Smyth =

British painter

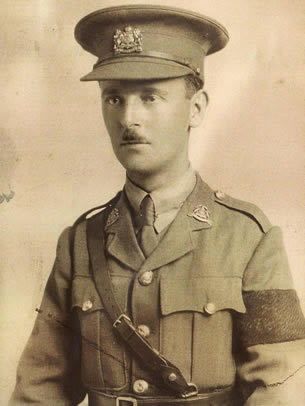
- Born: April 1888; Highgate, England, UK
- Died: March __, 1963; Bournemouth, England, UK

Paul Cranfield Smyth (1888-1963) was the founder of the Finchley Art Society and a prolific artist. From age seven onwards, he painted over 4000 pictures during his life. His subjects include some paintings done during the First World War in Gibraltar, Egypt and Netley Hospital. He also painted on Canvey Island, Hampstead and Highgate, Oxford and many other locations.

== Early life ==
Paul Cranfield Smyth was born in St. Anne’s School, Highgate in April 1883. His father (George) was the Headmaster of the school.

In 1896, he started working as a probationary teacher at the school and in 1901 received the Pupil Teacher's Bishops of London Prize for Religious Knowledge.

In 1902, Smyth entered St Marks College, Chelsea where he studied until 1904. Subsequently he taught in Holy Trinity Boys School, Sloane Square (1904) and Blackstock Road London County Council School (1908). Around this time the Hampstead Sketch Club was formed, with Paul Smyth as the secretary.

In 1913, he received the honour of having his painting – 'The Ferry Boat Inn' at Holywell in Cambridgeshire being displayed in the Royal Academy. It was sold to a Mr Smith for £20.

== World War I ==
Paul Smyth joined the 2/7th Middlesex Regiment in July 1914. In January 1915 he sailed on the 'Grantully Castle' to Gibraltar. He arrived in Cairo in August 1915. Whilst in both places he was able to do some painting when time allowed.

In 1916, his commission came through while at home in England, and he left for France as a second lieutenant in the 19th Manchester Regiment. He was wounded on the first day of the Battle of Passchendale in the Summer of 1917 and was returned to Netley Hospital on Southampton Water, where he was to stay for the next nine months recovering from his wounds.

== Inter War Period ==
In the years leading up to the First World War Paul Smyth visited and painted on Canvey Island, Essex many times. It was here that he met Elsie Mulley whom he married in Highgate, London on 20 July 1918.

Now living in Highgate and from 1922 teaching at Whittington School (Highgate), Smyth began to hold numerous painting exhibitions.

Paul Smyth was Headmaster of Upper Marylebone St. London County Council School from 1929 and Headmaster of Old Oak Senior Boys School from 1933.

In 1937 Paul and Elsie, together with their two children, moved from Highgate to North Finchley.

== War II and Afterwards ==
At the beginning of World War II, Paul Cranfield Smyth was the headmaster of Wormholt Park London County Council, Senior Boys School and was evacuated to Oxford with 500 children.

Living in lodgings in Iffley Road, he painted extensively in the city and held an exhibition of his work to raise money for the war effort in 1941.

He retired from teaching in 1943.

Post-war he founded the Finchley Art Society in 1949 and was its first president. The Society recently celebrated its 60th anniversary.

Paul Smyth died just before his 80th birthday while on holiday in Bournemouth in April 1963.
