= Tod Hanson =

English painter

Tod Hanson (born 1963) is a London-based artist known for his large-scale graphic installations and public artworks.

== Career ==
=== Early graphic work ===
In the 1990s, Hanson worked on a series of large-scale graphic works for Greenpeace UK protests, including a painting of Earth suspended over the main stage at the Glastonbury Festival. Hanson worked with Greenpeace to target Tesco by painting Fiasco, an exhibition truck highlighting the use of ozone destroying refrigeration systems, and to paint two excavators with Greenpeace graphics.

In 1991, Hanson decorated both LSE bar and The Brain in Soho.

=== Permanent public artworks ===
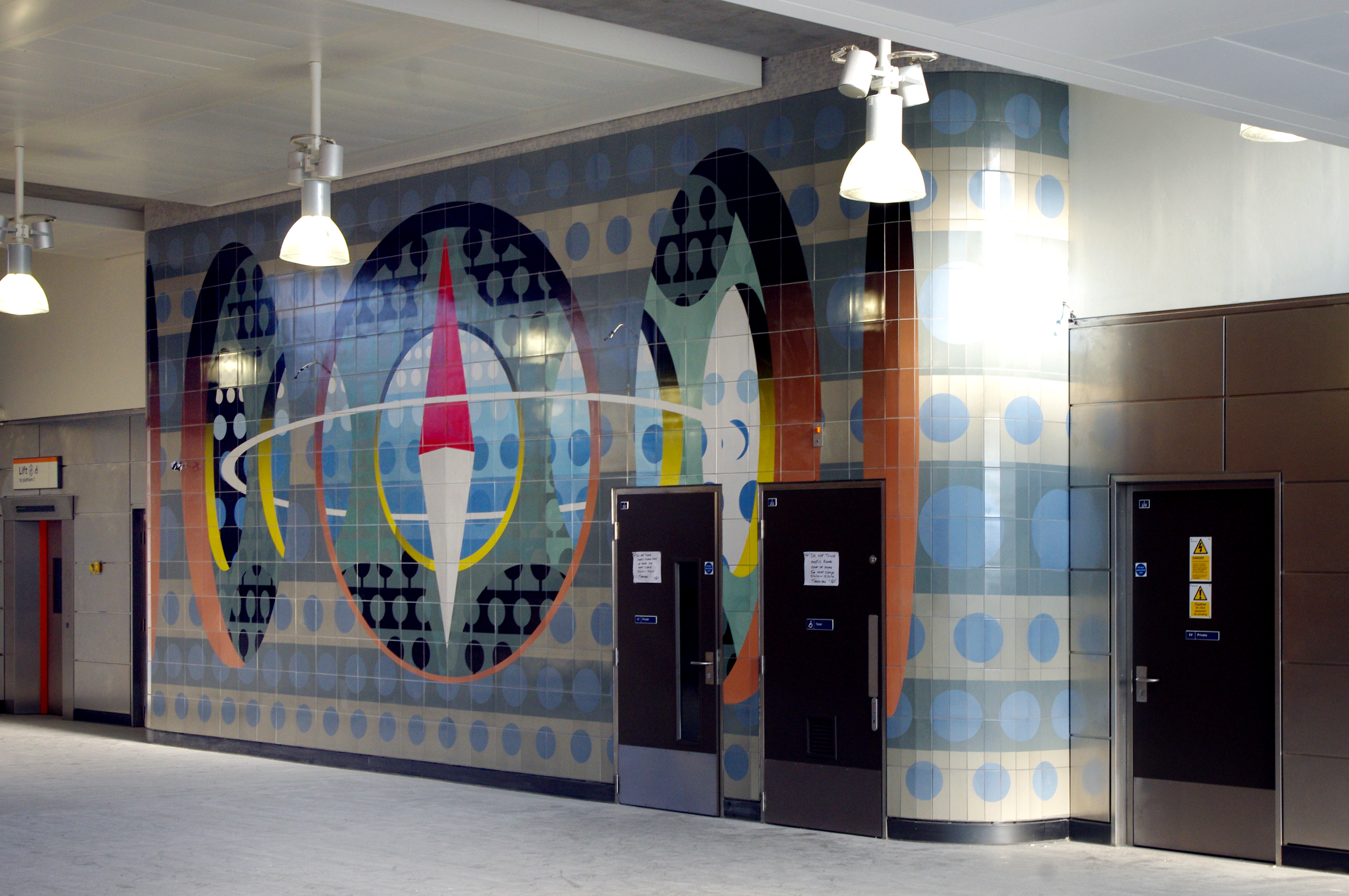
Elliptical Switchback, installed in Haggerston railway station.

Hanson's 2004 Grainger Town, a bronze and Granite work that is a collaboration with Simon Wakinson, is permanently installed on Neville Street, near the Central Station, in Grainger Town, Newcastle upon Thyne.

In 2009 Hanson's Elliptical Switchback, a tile mural commemorating Edmund Halley, was installed in the Haggerston railway station. The piece was the first public artwork commissioned by London Overground.

In 2015 he installed two public artworks on Balham Road in London, England.

His 2016 painting Pool of London is permanently installed in the Hackney New School, London.

Hanson's 2020 work Spectra is a public mural installed on the Centre Building of the London School of Economics campus.

=== Temporary exhibitions ===
Hanson has had a number of Solo shows including the Jerwood Artists platform at Cell Project Space in 2006.

In 2010 his temporary work Juggernaut Sunset was installed in the Landguard Fort as part of the festival Fleet: Art in the Haven Ports.

In 2015 his site-specific work floor painting, which covers the entire floor, was installed at the historic Durbar Hall of the Hastings Museum and Art Gallery as part of the Coastal Currents festival.
