= Sylvia Clark Molloy =

British artist (1914–2008)

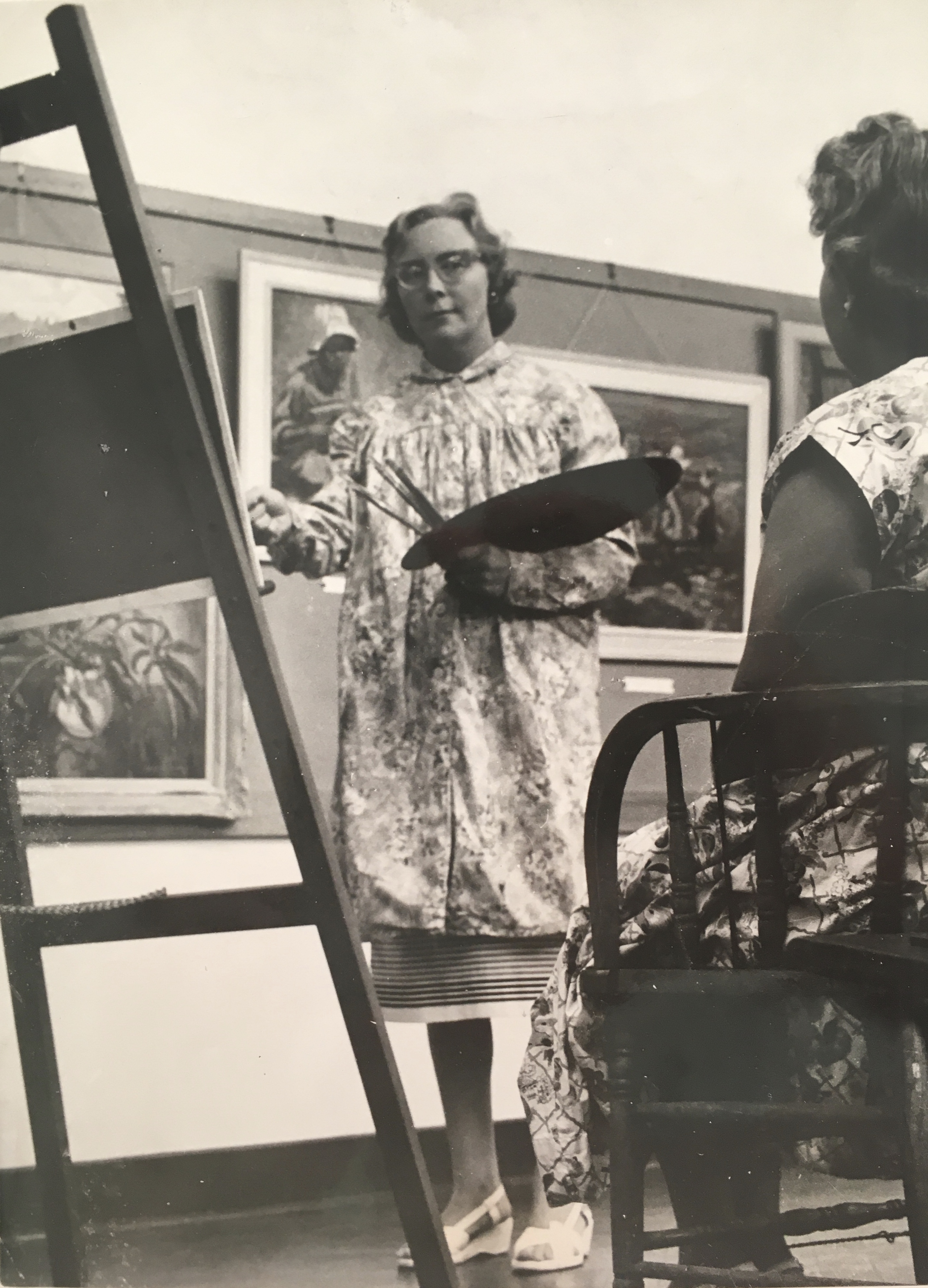
- Sylvia Molloy 1950
- Born: Sylvia Clark Leyden; 1914; South Shields, United Kingdom
- Died: 2008 (aged 93–94)
- Known for: Painting
- Spouse: Patrick R.H. Molloy (m. 1940)

Sylvia Clark Molloy (1914–2008), born Sylvia Clark Leyden, was a British Realist and Impressionist artist and teacher.

== Biography ==
Molloy was born in 1914 in South Shields, United Kingdom.

A graduate of Durham University, she lived abroad for much of her life.

In 1940 she traveled to Maymyo, Burma, to marry Patrick R. H. Molloy of the Burma Civil Service. She was evacuated from Burma in 1942 after the Japanese Invasion in World War II.

After time spent in Simla, India, Lahore, Pakistan and the United Kingdom, the Molloys settled in South Africa in 1947. In Johannesburg, Molloy ran an art school. She disregarded the country's apartheid laws by teaching black students at her studio.

During the 1940s Molloy's reputation as a portrait painter grew.

The Molloys returned to England in the mid-1960s. Her many paintings and sketches of the peoples of South Africa and Burma in particular, capture a broad cross section of society. Some can be viewed at the British Library (India Office Collections).

In later life she taught at Stratton School, Biggleswade, before becoming Head of Art at St Francis College, Letchworth Garden City. Her work has been exhibited at the Royal Academy and the Paris Salon. She wrote of her experiences in Burma in Burma Bride (Able 1996)
