= Sheila Mullen (artist) =

British artist

Sheila Mullen (born 1942) is a Scottish painter who lives and works in Scotland. She was born on 24 January 1942 in Glasgow, Scotland. She grew up near Auchtermuchty, Fife, Scotland. She attended the Glasgow School of Art and started painting professionally in 1978. Her works are in the permanent collections of the Leeds Art Gallery and the Duke of Buccleuch among others. In 2010 she was the subject of a monograph by Ann Matheson: The Bairns O Adam: The Paintings of Sheila Mullen. In 2006 she collaborated with the group of Scottish writers called the Crichton Writers in a project called The Art of Ballads and Bards: An Anthology of Work by the Crichton Writers and Art by Sheila Mullen resulting in a published volume documenting the series of workshops and sessions between the writers and Mullen.

== Sources ==
- Matheson, Ann. The Bairns o Adam; a monograph of Sheila Mullen's Paintings ISBN 1-84033-516-5
