= List of painters by name beginning with "F" =

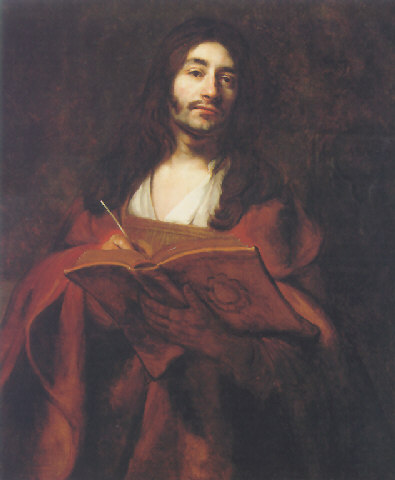
Barent Fabritius

Please add names of notable painters with a Wikipedia page, in precise English alphabetical order, using U.S. spelling conventions. Country and regional names refer to where painters worked for long periods, not to personal allegiances.

- Anton Filkuka (1888–1957) Austrian painter
- Bogi Fabian (born 1984), Hungarian/Italian painter
- Barent Fabritius (1624–1673), Dutch painter
- Carel Fabritius (1622–1654), Dutch painter
- Johannes Fabritius (1636–1693), Dutch still-life painter
- Pietro Faccini (1562–1602), Italian painter
- Caesar Andrade Faini (1913–1995), Ecuadorian painter and teacher
- Frances C. Fairman (1839–1923), English painter and illustrator
- Ian Fairweather (1891–1974), Scottish/Australian painter
- Leila Faithfull (1896–1994), English wartime and portrait painter
- Julian Fałat (1853–1929), Polish watercolor painter
- Aniello Falcone (1600–1665), Italian battle-scene painter
- Luis Ricardo Falero (1851–1896), Spanish painter
- Alexandre Falguière (1831–1900), French sculptor and painter
- Hans Falk (1918–2002), Swiss/Italian painter, poster artist and graphic designer
- Robert Falk (1886–1958), Russian painter
- Claire Falkenstein (1908–1997), American sculptor and painter
- Fernando Amorsolo (1892–1972), Philippines painter and portraitist
- Fan Kuan (范寬, 990–1030), Chinese landscape painter
- Fan Qi, (樊圻, 1616–1694), Chinese landscape painter
- Fang Congyi (方從義, 1302–1393) Chinese painter
- Farid Mansour (1929–2010), Lebanese painter and sculptor
- Henri Fantin-Latour (1836–1904), French painter and lithographer
- Dennis H. Farber (born 1946), American painter and photographer
- Demetrios Farmakopoulos (1919–1996), Greek painter
- Mahmoud Farshchian (born 1930), Persian painter and miniaturist
- Bernd Fasching (born 1955), Austrian painter and sculptor
- Giovanni Fattori (1825–1905), Italian artist and etcher
- Jean Fautrier (1898–1964), French painter, printmaker and sculptor
- Daphne Fedarb (1912–1992), English painter
- Helmut Federle (born 1944), Swiss painter
- Franz Fedier (1922–2005), Swiss painter
- Pavel Fedotov (1815–1852), Russian painter
- Paul Feeley (1910–1966), American artist and art director
- Fei Danxu (費丹旭, 1801–1850), Chinese painter
- Lyonel Feininger (1871–1956), American painter, caricaturist and comic-strip artist
- Robert Feke (1707–1752), American portrait painter
- Adolf Fényes (1867–1945), Hungarian artist
- Béni Ferenczy (1890–1967), Hungarian sculptor and graphic artist
- Károly Ferenczy (1862–1917), Hungarian painter
- Noémi Ferenczy (1890–1957), Hungarian tapestry designer and weaver
- Amos Ferguson (1920–2009), Bahamian folk artist
- William Gouw Ferguson (1632/1633 – c. 1689), Scottish/French painter
- Christian Jane Fergusson (1876–1957), Scottish painter
- John Duncan Fergusson (1874–1961), Scottish painter and sculptor
- Elsie Few (1909–1980), Jamaican/English painter and collage artist
- Anna Findlay (1885–1968), Scottish linocut and woodcut printmaker
- Celia Fiennes (1902–1998), English printmaker and illustrator
- Pedro Figari (1861–1938), Uruguayan painter, lawyer and politician
- Francesco Filippini (1853–1895), Italian painter
- Pavel Filonov (1883–1941), Russian painter, art theorist and poet
- Willy Finch (1854–1930). Belgian ceramicist and painter
- Perle Fine (1905–1988) American artist
- Leonor Fini (1907–1996), Argentine painter, illustrator and author
- Ian Hamilton Finlay (1925–2006), Scottish artist, writer and gardener
- Hans Fischer (1909–1958), Swiss painter
- Paul Gustave Fischer (1860–1934), Danish painter
- Janet Fish (born 1938), American artist
- Alvan Fisher (1792–1863), American landscape and genre painter
- Hugo Anton Fisher (1854–1916), Austro-Hungarian (Czech)/American landscape painter
- James Montgomery Flagg (1877–1960), American artist and illustrator
- Dennis Flanders (1915–1994), English painter and draftsman
- Juan de Flandes (1460–1519), Flemish/Spanish painter
- Bernard Fleetwood-Walker (1893–1965), English artist
- Govert Flinck (1615–1660), Dutch painter
- Sir William Russell Flint (1880–1969), Scottish painter and illustrator
- Cornelia MacIntyre Foley (1909–2010), American painter
- John Fulton Folinsbee (1892–1972), American painter
- Lucio Fontana (1899–1968), Argentinian painter, sculptor and theorist
- Victorine Foot (1920–2000), English painter and military camouflage artist
- Elizabeth Forbes (1859–1912), Canadian/English painter
- Stanhope Forbes (1857–1947), English artist
- Laura Ford (born 1961), English painter
- Michael Ford (1920–2005), English artist and illustrator
- Mollie Forestier-Walker (1912–1990), English portrait painter
- Melozzo da Forlì (ca. 1438–1494), Italian fresco painter
- William Forsyth (1854–1935), American painter
- Graham Forsythe (living), Northern Irish/Canadian painter
- E. Charlton Fortune (1885–1969), American painter
- Marià Fortuny (1838–1874), Spanish (Catalan) painter
- Johanna Marie Fosie (1726–1764), Danish painter
- Tsuguharu Foujita (藤田嗣治, 1886–1968), Japanese/French painter and print-maker
- Cherryl Fountain (born 1950), English still life, landscape and botanical artist
- Jean Fouquet (1425–1481), French panel painter, manuscript illuminator and portrait miniaturist
- Alexandre-Évariste Fragonard (1780–1850), French painter and sculptor
- Jean-Honoré Fragonard (1732–1806), French painter and printmaker
- Art Frahm (1907–1981), American painter
- Piero della Francesca (c. 1415 – 1492), Italian artist
- François Louis Thomas Francia (1772–1839), French painter
- John F. Francis (1808–1886), American still life painter
- Sam Francis (1923–1994), American painter and printmaker
- Hannah Frank (1908–2008), Scottish artist and sculptor
- Jane Frank (1918–1986), American painter, sculptor and mixed-media artist
- Helen Frankenthaler (1928–2011), American abstract expressionist painter
- Eva Frankfurther (1930–1959), English artist
- Manuel Franquelo (born c. 1950), Spanish painter and mixed-media sculptor
- Frank Frazetta (1928–2010), American artist and poster painter
- Wilhelm Freddie (1909–1995), Danish painter, sculptor and film-maker
- Robert Freebairn (1765–1808), Scottish/English painter
- Jane Freeman (1871–1963), English/American painter and art teacher
- Jane Freilicher (1924–2014), American painter
- Charles Alphonse du Fresnoy (1611–1665), French painter and writer
- Yitzhak Frenkel (1899–1981), Israeli-French painter, sculptor and glassworker born in Odessa
- Lucian Freud (1922–2011), English figurative painter
- Sigmund Freudenberger (1745–1801), Swiss painter
- Friedrich Ritter von Friedländer-Malheim (1825–1901), Austro-Hungarian (Bohemian) painter
- Caspar David Friedrich (1774–1840), German landscape painter
- Hans Fries (1465–1523), Swiss painter
- Pia Fries (born 1955), Swiss painter
- Frederick Carl Frieseke (1874–1939), American/French painter, illustrator and etcher
- Lorentz Frölich (1820–1908), Danish painter, illustrator and etcher
- Otto Frölicher (1840–1890), Swiss landscape painter
- Nicolas Froment (1450–1490), French religious painter
- Brian Froud (born 1947), English fantasy illustrator
- Fu Baoshi (傅抱石, 1904–1965), Chinese painter and art researcher
- Emil Fuchs (1866–1929) Austrian/American sculptor, painter and author
- Nick Fudge (born 1960), British painter, sculptor and digital artist
- Fujishima Takeji (藤島武二, 1867–1943), Japanese painter
- Fujiwara Nobuzane (藤原信実, 1176–1265), Japanese portrait painter
- Fujiwara Takanobu (藤原隆信, 1142–1205), Japanese portrait painter
- Francesco Furini (c. 1600 or 1603–1646), Italian painter
- Wilhelmina Weber Furlong (1878–1962), American modernist painter
- Thomas Furlong (1886–1952), American muralist and portrait painter
- Ludovit Fulla (1902–1980), Slovak painter, graphic artist and teacher
- Violet Fuller (1920–2006), English painter
- Joseph von Führich (1800–1876), Austrian painter
- John Russell Fulton (1896–1979), American painter and illustrator
- Charles Furneaux (1835–1913), American painter and art teacher
- Henry Fuseli (1741–1825), Swiss/English painter, draftsman and writer on art
- Anna Füssli (1749–1772), Swiss painter
- Johann Caspar Füssli (1706–1782), Swiss portrait painter and writer
- Johann Kaspar Füssli (1743–1786), Swiss painter and entomologist
- Sarah C. Frothingham (1821–1861), American miniature painter
