= Erlund Hudson =

British artist

- Born: 18 February 1912; Devon, England
- Died: 9 March 2011 (aged 99)
- Education: Torquay School of Art, Royal College of Art
- Known for: Painting, drawing

Eleanor Hudson, known professionally as Erlund Hudson, (18 February 1912 – 9 March 2011), was a British artist. Hudson was a watercolourist, etcher and designer and is notable for her depictions of women at work during the Second World War and for her post-war paintings of ballet dancers.

== Early life ==
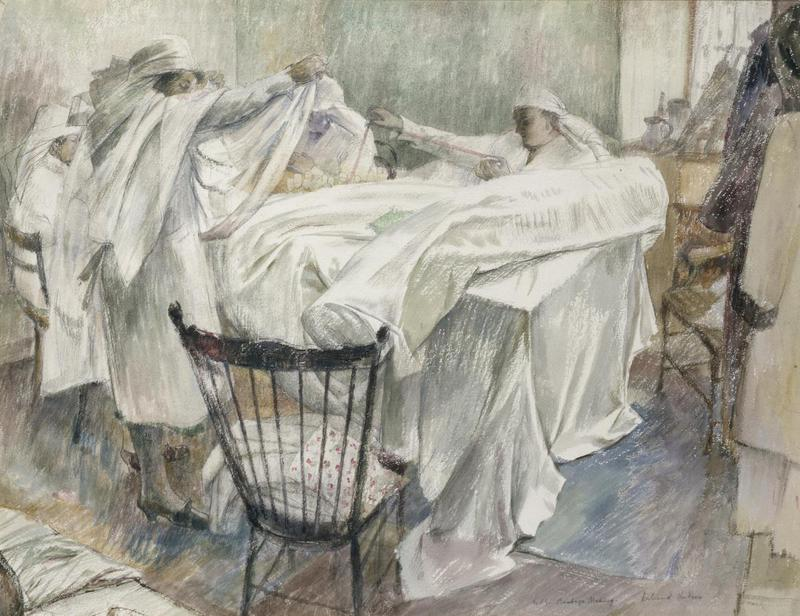
WVS Bandage-making (1942) (Art IWM ART LD 2991)

Erlund Hudson was born in St Marychurch, near Torquay in Devon. She was the youngest of seven children to Henry Hudson, a businessman from Liverpool, and Helen Ingeborg Olson, a Norwegian-American from Boston. At the age of ten she was confined to bed for a year with a spinal injury and spent much of her time drawing. She attended Torquay School of Art before securing a place in the school of engraving at the Royal College of Art, RCA. She studied under Malcolm Osborne and Robert Austin. She gained her diploma in 1937, won drawing prizes, a continuation scholarship and an RCA travelling scholarship. In 1937, while still a student, Hudson was elected to the Royal Society of Painter-Etchers and Engravers, and to the Royal Watercolour Society in 1939. She travelled throughout Italy in 1938 and 1939, but seemingly unaware of the developing political situation she only returned to Britain days before the outbreak of the Second World War and so avoided internment in Italy.

== World War II ==
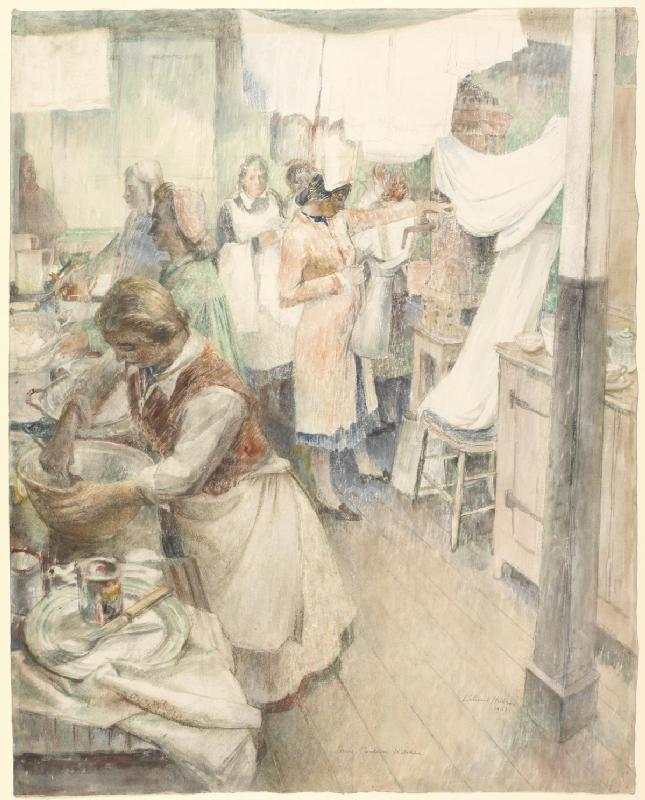
Forces Canteen Kitchen (Art IWM ART LD 2992)

At the start of World War II, Hudson went to Leicestershire and then to Kent, where she delivered her sister-in-law's baby when it was born prematurely during a thunderstorm. In Leicestershire she lived with her brother, the vicar of Ashby Magna, and his family. Here Hudson sketched local women preparing dried herbs and flowers which were sent to hospitals for medicinal uses. She also drew the canteens in Leicester where she helped with packing supply parcels for prisoners of war. Back in London, she moved to a fourth-floor flat in Earls Court and witnessed first-hand the death and destruction of the Blitz. She volunteered as a driver of a mobile canteen, actually a converted laundry van, and made tea and sandwiches for the rescue services attending at bomb sites. Later, she recalled how after a block of flats were bombed, bodies and limbs were strewn around. Visiting her mother in Torquay, she witnessed a similar scene in the aftermath of a bomb destroying a school. Hudson didn't draw these scenes, instead preferring to concentrate on depicting women volunteers hard at work for the war effort. She produced hundreds of paintings and drawings during the war. At Robert Austins suggestion she contacted the War Artists' Advisory Committee, WAAC, who purchased six of her drawings, including Village Women Drying Wild Herbs and WVS Bandage Making. These were displayed in WAAC exhibitions at the National Gallery during the war and then acquired by the Imperial War Museum.

== Post-war career ==
After the war Hudson designed costumes and scenery for Sadler's Wells and Ballet Rambert. This interest in ballet led Hudson to meet Nesta Brooking, who had opened a ballet school in Primrose Hill. Hudson became the Brooking School of Ballet's artistic director. As well as colleagues, the two became lifelong companions, and shared their lives until Brooking's death in 2006, aged 99. With the musical director Norman Higgins, Hudson and Brookings worked on projects with Cecchetti scholars and with the BBC as well as producing Brooking's own shows. Hudson was also a fine portrait painter, working mainly in watercolours and continued to exhibit in Britain, Scandinavia, Canada and the United States. In the 1960s she resigned from the various artistic societies she was a member of and worked as a restorer for The Rocking Horse, an antiques shop in St. John's Wood. In 2002, the Black Star Press reprinted some of her finest etching plates. In 2007, the Imperial War Museum held a party in her honour, which she attended with two of her contemporaries, Phyllis Diamond and Malvina Cheek. Their conversation was recorded by the BBC and broadcast as a Woman's Hour programme. As well as the Imperial War Museum, works by Hudson are held in the collections of the British Museum, Dudley Museum and Art Gallery, the Wellcome Library, the National Gallery of Canada and the Yale Center for British Art.

== Memberships ==
Hudson was a member of or affiliated with the following organisations:

- 1937: Elected associate of Royal Society of Painter-Etchers and Engravers,
- 1939: Elected associate of the Royal Watercolour Society,
- 1946: Elected full member of Royal Society of Painter-Etchers and Engravers,
- 1949: Elected full member of the Royal Watercolour Society.

Hudson was also a member of the Chicago Print Society and the Society of Artist Print Makers.
