= Colin Moss =

Colin Moss may refer to:

- Colin Moss (artist)
- Colin Moss (actor)
