= Vincent Evans (disambiguation) =

Vincent Evans (1915–2007) was a British diplomat, lawyer and judge.

Vincent Evans may also refer to:

- Vincent Evans (artist) (1896–1976), Welsh artist
- Vince Evans (born 1955), American football player
- Vincent Evans (journalist) (1851–1934), Welsh journalist

== See also ==
- Evans (surname)
