= Eric Craven Gregory =

British publisher and philanthropist 1887–1959)

Eric Craven Gregory, also known as Peter Gregory (6 October 1887 – 9 February 1959), was a publisher and benefactor of modern art and artists.

He was chairman of art publishers Percy Lund, Humphries & Co. Ltd. and of the Ganymed Press. From 1949 he was a director of The Burlington Magazine. He was a governor of St Martin’s School of Art (from 1948), Chelsea School of Art (from 1950), and the Bath Academy of Art at Corsham Court.

== Birth and family ==
Gregory was born on 6 October 1887 in Edinburgh, Scotland, the eighth and youngest son of Yorkshire parents.

His father, James Gregory, had been a powerful Congregationalist preacher in Leeds before succeeding William Lindsay Alexander at Edinburgh’s Augustine Church (1879) and serving as Chairman of the Congregational Union of Scotland (1890).

His mother, Martha, was a daughter of Joseph Craven, worsted manufacturer and Member of Parliament (MP) for Shipley. The couple returned to Yorkshire in 1896 and James Gregory, having retired from the ministry, was elected a Bradford city councillor and became chairman of the council’s Higher Education Sub-Committee and president of the local branch of the Workers’ Educational Association. Martha’s brother-in-law, William Priestley, was an MP for the city.

== Professional career and war service ==
Following education at Bradford Grammar School (where he won the Debating Society’s Cup), Gregory joined and soon occupied a managerial position at Percy Lund, Humphries & Co., printers and publishers based in Bradford with offices on London’s Amen Corner. He became joint managing director of the firm in 1930 and was chairman from 1945. Lund Humphries possessed particular expertise in graphic reproduction, published The Penrose Annual and, during the period of Gregory’s employment, became one of the most accomplished printers of illustrated art and design books.

The sophistication of its technical resources was evidenced in 1941 when the firm assisted development of a component for the gaseous diffusion plant associated with manufacture of Britain’s atomic bomb.

Gregory's service with Lund Humphries was twice interrupted by wartime duties. He was commissioned in the Bradford Rifles in 1914, saw action in France, and was wounded by cross-fire during the second battle of Bullecourt in May 1917. In the 1920s he commanded one of the West Yorkshire territorial companies and wrote the official account of his unit’s wartime operations (during which one-third of its number perished).

In World War II he was attached to the Ministry of Information and, from 1942, he was Secretary of the War Artists’ Advisory Committee.

== Involvement with the arts ==
Gregory had a deep regard for all forms of artistic expression. This feeling was doubtless fed by the increasing importance of design in the business of Lund Humphries, but it was also rooted in Gregory’s own family background. The painter and sculptor Ernest Sichel was among his cousins, and his elder brother, Edward Gregory (1880–1955), was a talented amateur artist whose work was regularly shown at the Bradford Art Society’s Spring Exhibitions. In the 1920s Gregory began collecting drawings, prints, paintings and sculpture; initially his taste seems to have been relatively conventional, but quite quickly he developed what was then a rare appreciation for contemporary British art.

Ernest Sichel was close to William Rothenstein and his brothers Albert and Charles Rutherston, and Gregory mixed with their Bradford circle. Charles Rutherston was not an artist but a passionate admirer of art and patron of artists who assembled what, according to Lawrence Haward, "art-lovers in this country have long recognised to be the very best private collection of modern English art in the country". In 1925 Rutherston donated the collection to Manchester City Gallery because he felt it selfish to keep it to himself. Rutherston’s focus and philosophy were to be mirrored in Gregory’s own collecting habits, though he lacked the fortune Rutherston had made in business.

In 1923 Rutherston introduced Gregory to Henry Moore and there began a lifelong friendship between the two men. Gregory became an important patron of Moore, buying his work at a time when, as Moore later recalled, "I was an unknown sculptor and there were very few, less than half a dozen, collectors of modern sculpture in this country... The debt that I owe him is enormous".

Among Gregory’s other early enthusiasms were the paintings of Matthew Smith and Vivian Pitchforth, and in the 1930s and 1940s his purchases and practical support promoted the careers of artists who were yet to establish themselves, including Ben Nicholson, Kenneth Armitage, Lynn Chadwick, Reg Butler, Victor Pasmore, Eduardo Paolozzi, Barbara Hepworth, Graham Sutherland and others of whom, said Jane Drew, "the list is endless".

Eager that work he appreciated should reach a wider audience, he donated examples to galleries, supported public exhibitions, and promoted publication in photographic form. In 1933 he shared the cost of a Sheffield exhibition of work by contemporary Yorkshire artists. In the following year he extended the credit that enabled Anton Zwemmer to publish the first book on Henry Moore, and in 1938 he was instrumental in arranging a showing at Leeds of Picasso’s preparatory sketches for Guernica. In 1933, having relocated Lund Humphries’ London office to 12 Bedford Square in Bloomsbury, Gregory opened a small exhibition gallery in the basement, used by Man Ray as the venue for his only London exhibition and subsequently as his studio.

In 1939 Lund Humphries’ publication of Frank Lloyd Wright’s An Organic Architecture established the firm as a leader in the cause of modernism, confirmed in 1944 by its lavishly illustrated Henry Moore: Sculpture and Drawings. Production of the latter was considered to be a commercially daring investment in the work of a single living artist, but its success led to publication of what became a catalogue raisonné of Moore’s work (six volumes on his sculpture and seven on his drawings). It was also followed by the firm’s launch of a series of similar monographs on Paul Nash, Nicolson, Hepworth and Naum Gabo.

In 1946 he presented thirty-two pictures (including six Pitchforths) to Manchester City Gallery, and in the following year, together with Peter Watson, Herbert Read and Roland Penrose, he founded the Institute of Contemporary Arts (ICA) to provide a London centre for experimental work in art, music, film and drama. He was honorary treasurer of ICA until his death, serving on its management committee and assisting with its financing.

In the 1950s Gregory was honorary secretary of the Contemporary Art Society and made purchases in support of the Society’s objective of placing contemporary pictures in public collections. He was always a generous lender of items from his own collection: in 1941 five of his Moores were on loan to Temple Newsam; in 1943 numerous of his paintings hung at the International Youth Centre in Pont Street; in 1953 Wakefield City Art Gallery had from him a Modigliani drawing, two Georges Braque oils, a Picasso engraving, an André Derain landscape, a Nicholson, one of Moore’s "shelter drawings", and Maria Helena Vieira da Silva’s Paris.

== The Gregory Fellowships ==
In 1943 Leeds University accepted Gregory’s offer to fund a number of fellowships in the creative arts. Fellows were to become members of the University’s staff for a defined number of years and to continue their creative work while in residence, discussing and explaining it to other members of staff and students. Fellowships were to be up to four in number and held in literature, poetry, painting, sculpture, architecture and, on occasion, music. Gregory insisted one fellowship should always be held by a poet because he believed "poetry interprets life in its finest aspect".

The objective of the fellowship scheme, as defined by Gregory, was to bring younger artists into close touch with the youth of the country so that they might influence it while also allowing artists to keep in touch with the needs of the community. He sensed that the provincial universities were remote from the mainstream of national culture, particularly the creative arts which were mostly centred in and around London, and he wanted in some measure to remedy this. "The scheme", observed the Yorkshire Post, "will prove of practical value – a point that will appeal to many Yorkshiremen". Arrangements for award and management of the fellowships were supervised by a committee that included Gregory, Henry Moore, Herbert Read, T. S. Eliot and Bonamy Dobrée, and the first fellows took up residence in 1950.

The Gregory Fellowships, as they were known, were funded by Gregory until his death. Thereafter Leeds University funded the Fellowships until their discontinuance in 1980. Among Gregory Fellows were: (Poetry) Thomas Blackburn, John Heath-Stubbs, James Kirkup, Jon Silkin; (Painting) Trevor Bell, Alan Davie, Terry Frost, Martin Froy; (Sculpture) Kenneth Armitage, Reg Butler, Hubert Dalwood, Austin Wright; and (Music) Kenneth Leighton. The perceived success of the Fellowship scheme was marked by the university conferring the honorary degree of Doctor of Laws on Gregory who "makes the University a living centre of the Arts, creative as well as critical, and at the same time brings to youth the realisation that artists are men and women like themselves. He is a man of rare imagination, idealistic, practical, seminal".

== Personal qualities and appointments ==
Philip Hendy remembered Gregory as "the most unassuming of men... a handsome embodiment of the bluff and kindly Yorkshireman of fiction". Jane Drew described him as adhering to "the highest standards of conduct. He had a quality of being lovable as well as respected, which made him a most unusual man." Henry Moore, who had travelled widely with him, frequently abroad, found him "the ideal travelling companion, never ruffled or moody or upset by difficulties... ever fresh and anxious to visit any place or site or building or gallery that might contain objects of beauty".

He was a member of the Committee for the Battersea Open Air Sculptural Exhibition of 1951 (coinciding with the Festival of Britain), of the Standing Commission on Museums and Galleries (from 1952), and of the Art Panel for the Arts Council of Great Britain (1954–56). He was Chairman of the Design Research Unit. The Royal Institute of British Architects made him an Honorary Associate.

== Death and final benefactions ==
Gregory never married and he died suddenly, from a heart-attack, in Lagos, Nigeria, on 9 February 1959. Memorial services for him were held in Bradford Cathedral (Charles Morris gave the address) and St Luke's Church, Chelsea (Herbert Read spoke); in July the ICA held an exhibition in his memory, comprising 57 items selected from his collection.

By his will he left £10,000 to the Arts Council for the benefit of the ICA and such other purposes as the council should decide, and he gave the Trustees of the Tate Gallery any six works from his collection which they might care to choose. He left the residue of his estate to the Society of Authors to fund the making of Eric Gregory Awards for the support and encouragement of young poets who are British subjects.

Gregory’s collection, which had been housed in his tiny flat at 139 Swan Court, Chelsea, numbered some 150 items at his death. From it the Tate elected to take as gifts Louis Marcoussis’s Interior with a Double Bass, Moore’s Figure and Half-Figure, Hans Arp’s Constellation According to the Laws of Chance, Jean Dubuffet’s Man with a Hod, and Vieira da Silva’s Paris. Gregory’s executors (who included Bonamy Dobrée) also gave the Tate a Giacometti drawing closely related to the sculptor’s Man Pointing, already owned by the gallery, and agreed to sell to the Tate twelve further pieces comprising works by Moore, Hepworth, Paolozzi, Dalwood, Butler, Davie, Frost, Anthony Caro and Robert Clatworthy. In November 1959 Sotheby’s held two auctions of sculpture and paintings from the residual collection. The lots included twenty-one examples of work by members of the St Ives School (7 Nicholsons, 7 Hepworths, 5 Frosts, an Alfred Wallis and a Wilhelmina Barns-Graham), and paintings by Gillian Ayres, Sandra Blow and William Scott.

== Legacy ==
In 1959 obituary tributes, Philip Hendy (then Director of the National Gallery) opined that Gregory had "perhaps played a larger part in the English art history of the past 40 years than any other man who is not an artist", and Jane Drew considered "a whole generation of artists and poets are indebted to him". His influence on the artistic world endures through the work of those who benefited from his sponsorship. This thread of continuity, it has been suggested, was present when David Hockney "first found his voice as a modern artist" after seeing Alan Davie’s abstract expressionist work exhibited during Davie’s Gregory Fellowship.

The Gregory Fellowships were essentially the prototype for the artist/writer-in-residence initiatives that subsequently became widespread in academic and other institutions in Britain and for which the Arts Council first promulgated guidelines in 1997.

Eric Gregory Awards continue to be made annually to British poets under the age of 30.

== Honours ==
- Hon. LL.D. Leeds University, 1953
- Hon. Associate of the Royal Institute of British Architects (A.R.I.B.A.)
