= Barry Craig =

Barry Craig may refer to

- Barry L. Craig, Anglican priest and president of Huron University College
- Frank Barrington Craig, also known as Barry Craig, British painter and art teacher

== See also ==
- Barrie Craig, Confidential Investigator, a radio series
