= Stella Schmolle =

British painter (1908-1975)

- Born: 1908; Barnes, London
- Died: 5 March 1975 (aged 66–67)
- Education: Central School of Arts and Crafts
- Known for: Painting

Stella Schmolle (1908-5 March 1975) was an English painter, known for the paintings she produced while serving in the Auxiliary Territorial Service during World War II and for her post-war portrait paintings.

== Early life ==
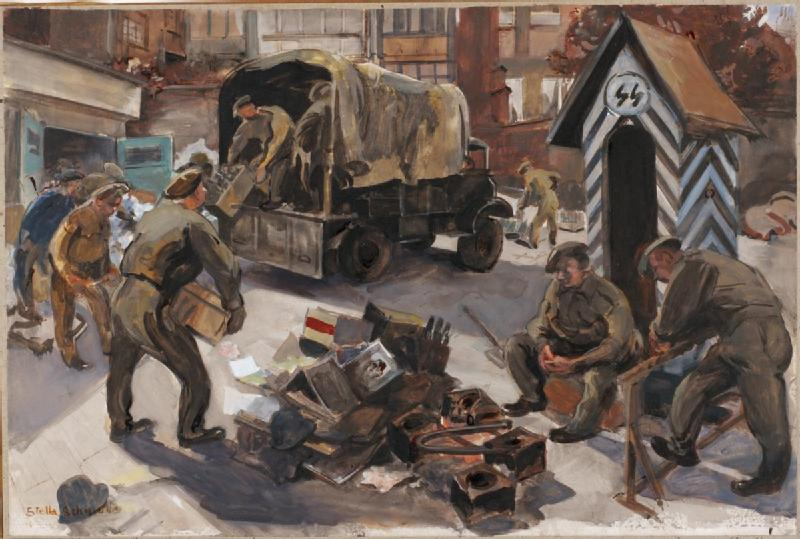
Pioneers Clearing Out an SS HQ Brussels - October 1944 (Art.IWM ART LD 4993)

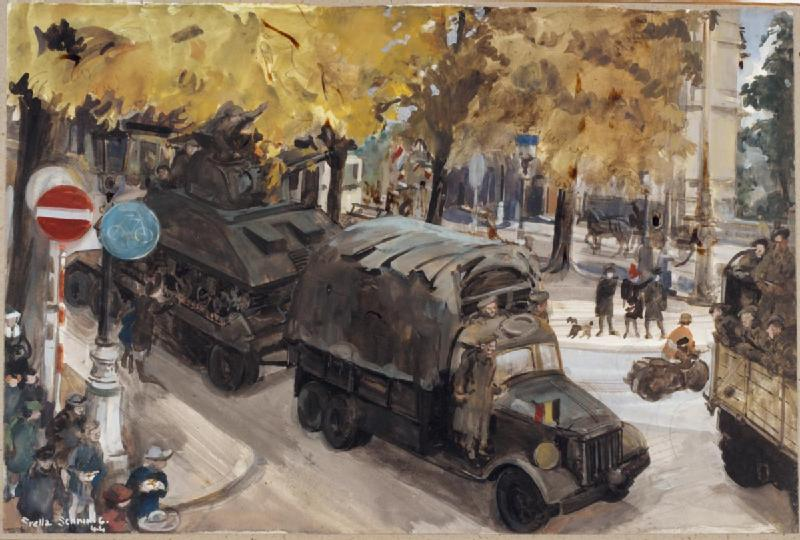
A Convoy Moving Up to the Front, Avenue Louise, Brussels - October 1944 (Art.IWM ART LD 4995)

Schmolle was born in Barnes in west London. She attended the Central School of Arts and Crafts. Upon graduating, in 1939, she worked as a commercial artist and illustrator. Works by Schmolle were shown at the Royal Academy between 1938 and 1940.

== World War II ==
In December 1941, Schmolle applied to join the Art Department of the Ministry of Information but was not accepted. However the War Artists' Advisory Committee, WAAC, of the same Ministry agreed to assist her in obtaining materials to continue working as an artist during the Second World War. In 1942, Schmolle was conscripted into the Auxiliary Territorial Service, ATS, and initially did camouflage work before becoming a draughtswoman for an ATS intelligence officer. She served with the ATS in both Britain and, following the D-Day landings in 1944, also France and Belgium. During this period she continued to paint. Her subjects included scenes showing French collaborators in Normandy, British troops clearing an SS headquarters in Brussels and both ATS and civilian activities in Britain. Eventually seventeen of these pictures were purchased by the War Artists Advisory Committee.

== Later life ==
After the war Schmolle was commissioned to produce a Stations of the Cross series for the Roman Catholic Chapel at the Royal Military Academy Sandhurst. She became an art teacher and was a well known portrait painter. For a time she taught at the Central School of Arts and Crafts, where she had been a student. Works by Schmolle are held by the British Museum, Auckland Art Gallery, the National Army Museum and the Imperial War Museum, which acquired the works previously purchased by WAAC.
