= Albert Richards (artist) =

British war artist

- Born: 19 December 1919; Liverpool, England
- Died: 5 March 1945 (aged 25); Gennep, Netherlands
- Cause of death: Killed in action
- Education: Wallasey School of Art; Royal College of Art
- Known for: Painting, drawing

Albert Richards (19 December 1919 – 5 March 1945) was a British war artist. Born in 1919 to a World War I veteran, he enlisted as a sapper in 1940. He later served in the British Army during World War II, both as a paratrooper and as a war artist. He was the youngest of the three British official war artists killed during the conflict.

== Early life ==
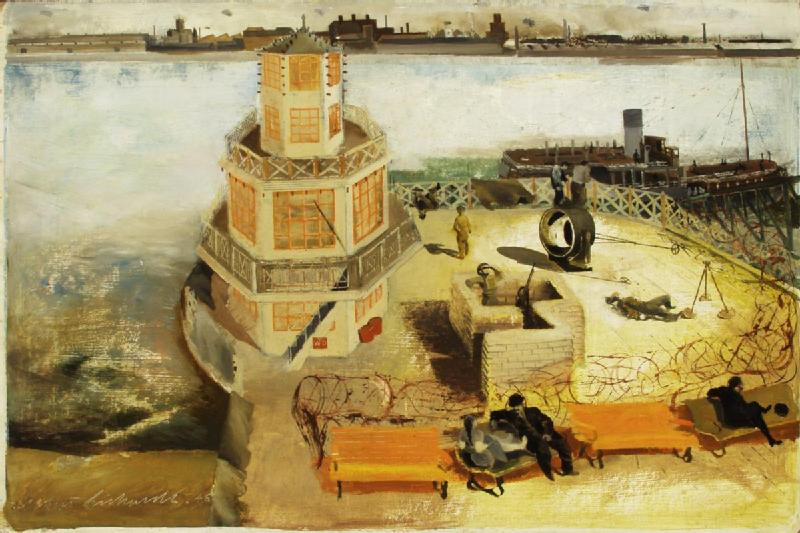
A Searchlight Battery. (Art. IWM ARTLD 3284)

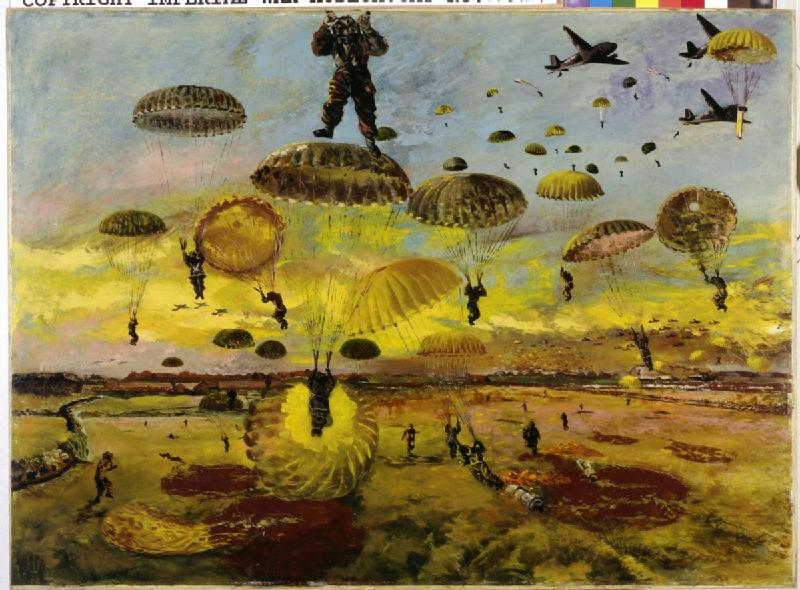
The Drop. (Art. IWM ARTLD 3924)

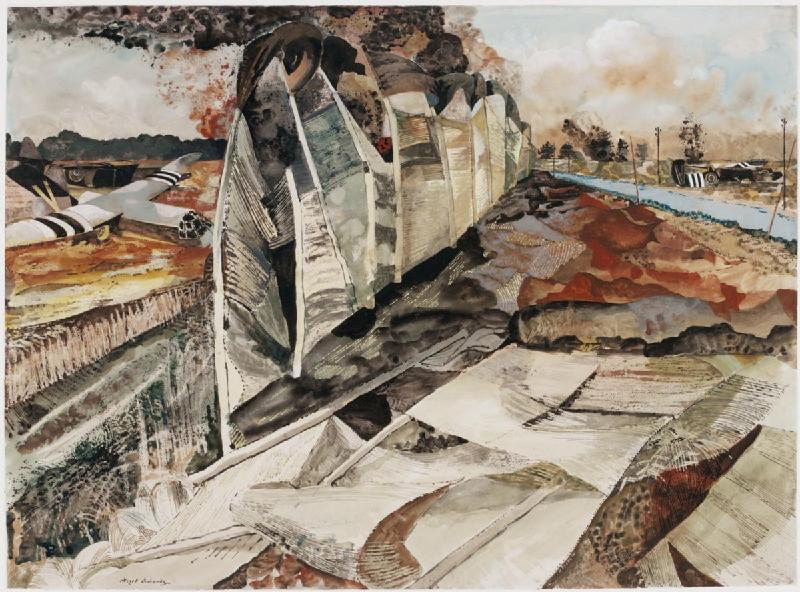
France- the Beach Head, 1944; the road between St Aubin and Benouville,..

Richards was born in Liverpool, the son of Hannah Beatty and George Richards, a World War I veteran and wood machinist. After attending the Wallasey School of Art and Crafts, Albert Richards studied at the Royal College of Art for three months before being conscripted into the Army in 1940. He enlisted as a sapper in 286 Field Company, Royal Engineers and was promoted to the rank of Lance Corporal. He served as a sapper from April 1940 until the middle of 1943.

During that period he was assigned to duties such as building barrack huts and defence works throughout England and he frequently painted scenes showing these tasks. He submitted several of these paintings to the War Artists' Advisory Committee, which, impressed with their freshness and quality, began in May 1941, to purchase his artwork.

== 1943–45 ==
In 1943, Richards volunteered for parachute duties and he underwent training at the No.1 Parachute Training School at RAF Ringway, near Manchester, He depicted this training in several paintings such as Kilkenny's Circus and Parachute Training over Tatton Park. In September 1943 Richards was offered a three-month contract by WAAC but declined to accept due to his other commitments; in December 1943 he accepted his first six-month WAAC commission.

In March 1944, he was granted an honorary commission with the rank of Captain. Later in the month Richards took part in a large scale parachute drop over Brize Norton in Oxfordshire, an event he recalled in the painting The Drop. This was in fact a practice exercise for D-Day. Richards took part in a second such event, Operation Mush, over five days in April across Gloucestershire.

On D-Day, Richards landed in France by parachute with the 6th Airborne Division and took part in the attack on the Merville Battery and the capture of Le Plein village. Richards depicted the attack on the gun battery in several paintings composed within a few weeks of D-Day. After Le Plein had been secured, Richards continued with the advancing Allied forces through France and, after a brief period of leave in England, on into the Low Countries. In France he painted scenes such as the remains of the gliders used in the attack on Pegasus Bridge at Ranville, destroyed bridges and roadside camouflage screens.

In January 1945, he recorded the funerals held for the victims of the massacre at Bande in Belgium. One of Richards' last pictures, painted in February 1945, shows the bridge at Gennep built by Allied sappers across the flooded River Maas. It was in this area that Richards was killed on 5 March 1945 when his jeep drove over a landmine. He is buried in Plot 1, Row G, Grave 11 at Milsbeek War Cemetery, near Gennep.

== Legacy ==
As well as the Tate and the Imperial War Museum, Richards' pictures are represented in the collections of the Walker Art Gallery, the National Maritime Museum, and the Williamson Art Gallery.
