= James Ardern Grant =

English painter {1885-1973)

- Born: 1885; Liverpool, England
- Died: 1973 (aged 87–88)
- Known for: Portrait painter, printmaker

James Ardern Grant (1885–1973), was an English printmaker, painter and teacher, who worked mostly in portraiture.

== Biography ==
Grant was born in Liverpool and studied at the Liverpool School of Art and the Académie Julian in Paris before returning to England. Grant was a member of the Sandon Studios in Liverpool and did some teaching at the Liverpool School of Art, but moved to London in 1913 after his marriage to Ann Stringer Dawson. Ann was a talented pianist and together they had a son, the architect Ian Dawson Grant, who was later to become one of the founder members of The Victorian Society.

In London, James Ardern Grant became vice-principal of the Central School of Arts and Crafts and worked for a period teaching at the etching and painting department of the City and Guilds of London Art School. Amongst his acquaintances of the period was Sir Roger de Grey who was later to become Principal of the School from 1973 until the 1990s. Grant also became a member of the Chelsea Arts Club and in the 1920s to the 1950s helped organise the famous fancy dress balls at the Albert Hall to raise funds for artists' charities. It was during these years that he made acquaintance with artists, sculptors and musicians of the stature of Frank Dobson (sculptor), Oswald Birley, Augustus John, John Da Costa, George Harcourt (painter), Sir John Lavery, Eleanor Fortescue-Brickdale and the composer John Ireland (composer) who wrote a small Lullaby for his baby son Ian. In 1932 Grant was elected a Fellow of Royal Society of Painter-Printmakers and was a member, and later president, of the Pastel Society.

In April 1944, during the Second World War, Grant had a single portrait commission approved by the War Artists' Advisory Committee. Grant's portraits of Alexander Fleming and Lamorna Birch are in the collection of the National Portrait Gallery, London. Although much of his work as an artist consisted of etchings and landscape paintings, the majority of his work is mainly portraiture. Of those portraits, the ones he painted of his family are noteworthy, particularly one of his wife Ann Grant in an English landscape park in top hat and hunting coat; and another of his young son Ian Grant in a bucolic landscape inspired by that of the portrait of Mademoiselle Caroline Rivière by Jean-Auguste-Dominique Ingres, the preparatory pastel sketch of which was sold at auction in 2001. Throughout his career Grant exhibited extensively at the Royal Academy, Chenil Gallery, the New English Art Club, the Royal Society of Arts and has works in the collections of the Walker Art Gallery in Liverpool and of the Whitworth Art Gallery in Manchester.
