= War Artists' Advisory Committee =

WWII British government agency

The War Artists Advisory Committee (WAAC), was a British government agency established within the Ministry of Information at the outbreak of the Second World War in 1939 and headed by Sir Kenneth Clark. Its aim was to compile a comprehensive artistic record of Britain throughout the war. This was achieved both by appointing official war artists, on full-time or temporary contracts and by acquiring artworks from other artists. When the committee was dissolved in December 1945 its collection consisted of 5,570 works of art produced by over four hundred artists. This collection was then distributed to museums and institutions in Britain and around the world, with over half of the collection, some 3,000 works, going to the Imperial War Museum.

== Aims and objectives ==
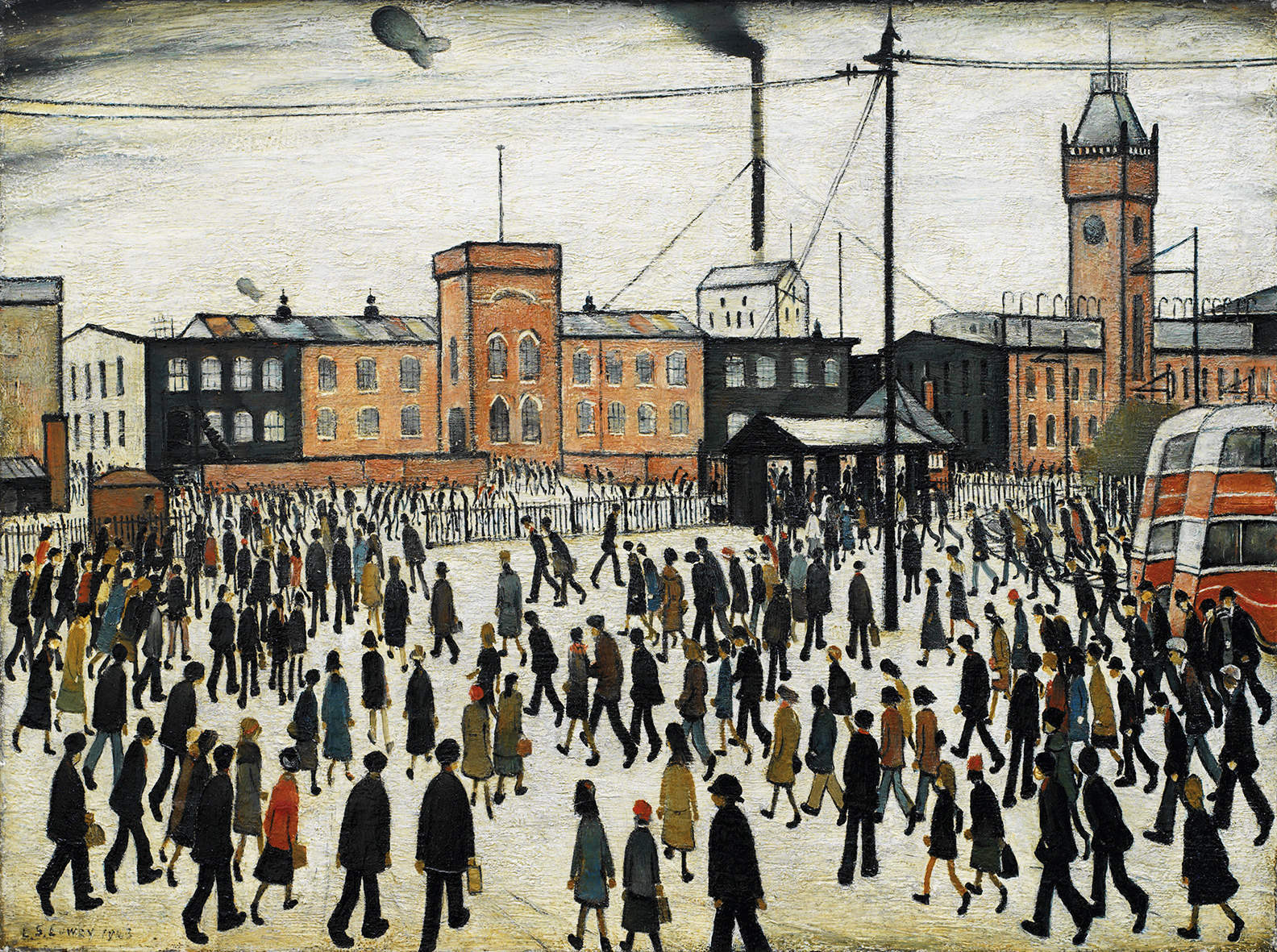
Factory workers going to work at the Mather & Platt, Manchester, in the snow, by L. S. Lowry, 1943

The stated aim of the WAAC, and the War Artists Advisory Scheme, which it ran, was:

to draw up a list of artists qualified to record the war at home and abroad. In co-operation with the Services Departments, and other Government Departments...to advise on the selection of artists on this list for war purposes and on the arrangements for their employment

Clark, then director of the National Gallery, was the driving force behind the establishment of the committee. The advent of World War II saw many artists cease working and lose their incomes as commercial galleries closed, private commissions ceased and the art schools reduced their teaching or closed altogether. This led Clark to fear artists' unemployment, and he sought to keep artists engaged with wartime commissions, aiming for a contemporary artistic record of the war. Clark also led the Pilgrim Trust's Recording Britain watercolour scheme which was devised as a pictorial Domesday Book of British life before an anticipated German invasion. Clark later admitted that he hoped to prevent artists from being killed on active service. Clark's lobbying for Government support for artists at the outset of the war directly led to the formation of the WAAC. The primary purpose of the committee was officially propaganda and keeping up public morale with art exhibitions, which were staged at the National Gallery. Showing British war art in North America during 1941 was aimed at persuading the United States to lend economic and military support to Britain at a time of American neutrality.

== Membership ==
The WAAC met at the National Gallery once a month, with members drawn from government departments, the forces and London art schools. The original members of the committee were

- Sir Kenneth Clark, Chair of WAAC
- E.M.O'R. Dickey, Committee Secretary until 1942 then a Committee member
- E.C. Gregory, Committee Secretary from 1942
- Muirhead Bone, artist member and trustee of the Imperial War Museum
- Percy Jowett, artist member and Principal of the Royal College of Art
- Walter Russell, artist member and Keeper of the Royal Academy Schools
- Colin Coote, War Office representative
- R.M.Y. Gleadowe, Admiralty representative
- W.P. Hildred, Air Ministry representative, until 1940
- T.B. Braund, Ministry of Home Security representative, until 1940
- Randolph Schwabe, member from 1941 and Slade Professor of Fine Art UCL

Later in the war representatives from the ministries of Supply, Production and War Transport joined the committee. Although some of the original members were moved to other duties as the war developed, Clark, Bone, Dickey and Russell remained active members throughout the conflict.

== Operations ==
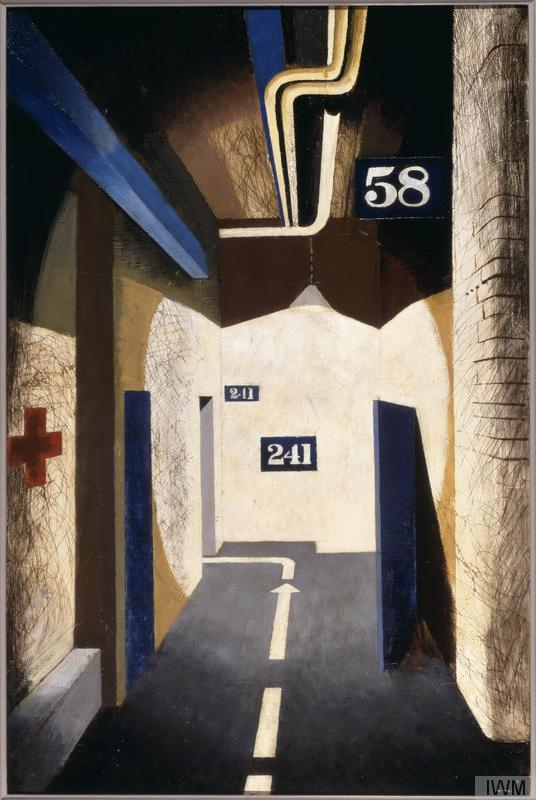
The Passage to the Control-room at South West Regional Headquarters, Bristol, (Art. IWM ART LD 170), by John Piper

The committee operated by employing artists on full-time contracts, offering short-term commissions to artists on individual subjects and by purchasing finished works offered to it. In total WAAC acquired artworks from some four hundred artists. It also issued permits allowing artists access to otherwise restricted areas and rationed materials. Wartime rationing restricted good quality paper for printmaking and materials for sculpture so such works were under-represented in the WAAC collection. In June 1941, WAAC established a scheme to obtain artworks by artists from Britain's overseas colonies. Although four artists were sent to record the activities of the British Expeditionary Force in France, at the start of the war the majority of WAAC commissions were for subjects on the British home front, but as the conflict progressed twenty-six men were given overseas commissions. Among these were Edward Ardizzone, Henry Carr, and Edward Bawden who each went to the Middle East, Leslie Cole was sent to Malta, France and South-East Asia, Vivian Pitchforth went to Burma, and Anthony Gross went to the Middle East and Burma before joining the Normandy landings. Two women, Mary Kessell and Laura Knight, were also, towards the end of the war, given overseas commissions. Other artists serving overseas but working without a WAAC commission or contract, submitted work which was then purchased by the committee. These included Doris Zinkeisen and Stella Schmolle serving with the Red Cross and the Auxiliary Territorial Service respectively. Three artists, Thomas Hennell, Eric Ravilious and Albert Richards, were killed during the Second World War whilst working on WAAC commissions.

== Publications ==
The committee produced two sets of four paperback booklets during the war, both called War Pictures by British Artists. Each booklet consisted of an introductory essay and fifty black-and-white reproductions. The first set of four, entitled Army, Blitz, R.A.F and War at Sea, sold some 24,000 copies and led to a second set, Air Raids, Production, Soldiers and Women, being published in 1943. Attempts by the committee to produce more extensive and higher quality publications fell foul of war-time printing restrictions and rationing.

== Exhibition programme ==
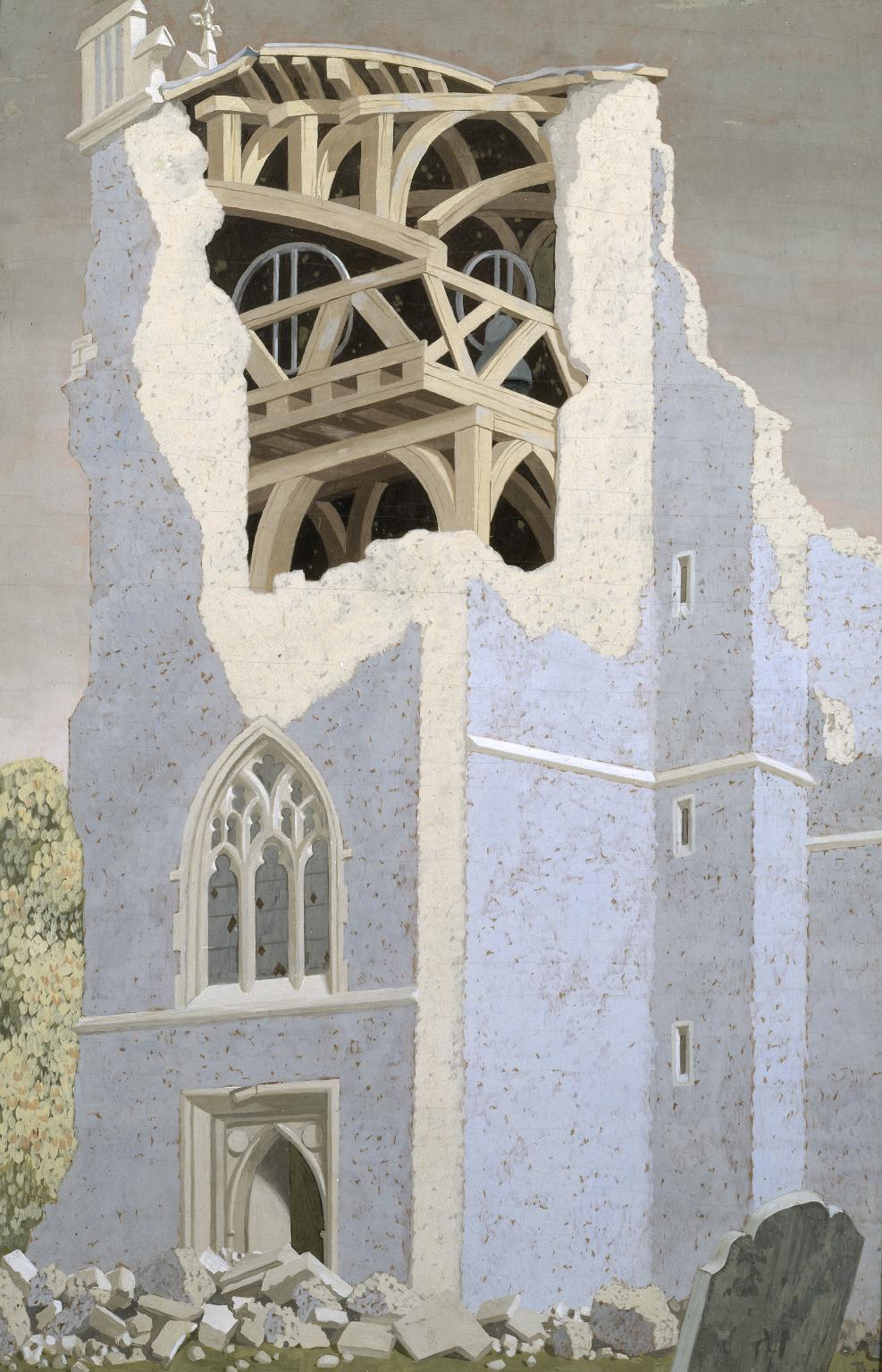
Coggeshall Church, Essex, (Tate, 1940) by John Armstrong

=== Overseas exhibitions ===
- Britain at War was the committee's major overseas exhibition with oils and watercolours from over thirty artists. It opened at the Museum of Modern Art, New York, in May 1941, with some 3,000 people attending on the opening day. The selection of works was aimed at undermining American neutrality. The exhibition went on to Baltimore before fourteen images, with Canadian themes, were added for showings in Ottawa, Toronto and Montreal. The exhibition was then split in two for display in Pittsburgh and London, Ontario before the entire catalogue was exhibited in San Francisco in 1942. Britain at War then toured Central and South America in place of 111 WAAC paintings that had been lost when the ship taking them to Rio de Janeiro was sunk.
- India in Action, which toured Australia, New Zealand and the United States in 1944 and 1945, consisted of fifty-one drawings by Anthony Gross, made in 1941-43 of Indian forces in the Far East.
- An exhibition of over one hundred pictures was displayed in South Africa from 1944 to 1947.

=== UK exhibitions ===
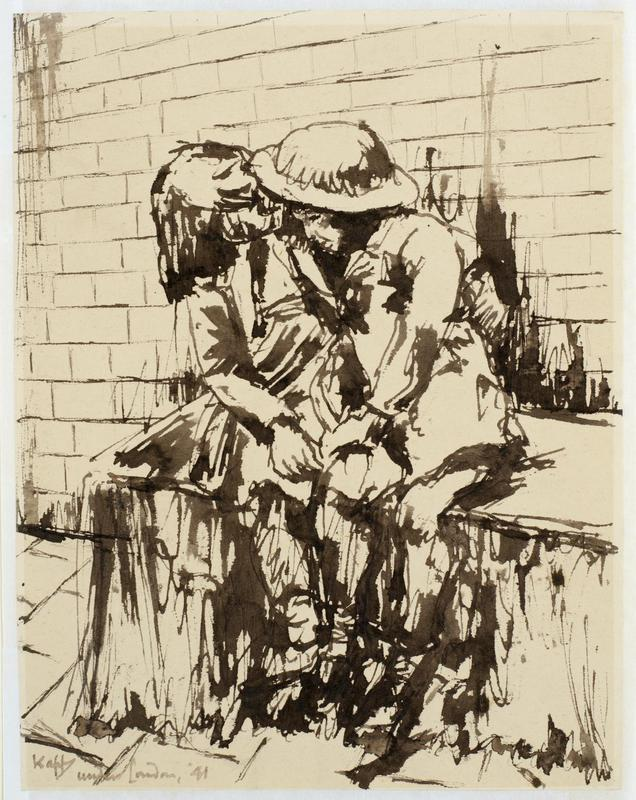
A Brother and Sister Sheltering in the Underground, 1941, (Art.IWM ART LD 795), by Edmond Xavier Kapp

WAAC organised exhibitions around the United Kingdom on a large scale and to a regular schedule.

- The Museums Association organised an exhibition of WAAC items which visited 65 venues, mostly regional museums and well established galleries.
- Four exhibitions of WAAC war art were toured by the British Institute of Adult Education to eighty smaller, more informal locations.
- With the National Gallery's own collection evacuated from London, WAAC used space in the Trafalgar Square building to display works from its growing collection. From July 1940 onwards, new works were added at regular intervals and the exhibition remained open throughout the war, bar a short period in October 1940 due to damage from air raids.
- The War at Sea;- shown at the National Gallery in September 1944 consisted of 52 paintings by Norman Wilkinson. Wilkinson was a World War I navy veteran and during World War II he travelled extensively on Royal Navy ships and was aboard HMS Jervis on D-Day. WAAC bought one painting from Wilkinson and he donated the other fifty-one paintings to the committee. Throughout 1945 and 1946 the exhibition was shown in Australia and New Zealand.
- 400 works from the collection were exhibited at the Glasgow Art Gallery in the spring of 1945.
- A final exhibition of the WAAC collection was held at Burlington House between 13 October and 25 November 1945. The exhibition consisted of 1028 drawings, paintings and prints plus twenty-one sculptures, but attracted less than 20,000 paying visitors in total.

== Legacy ==
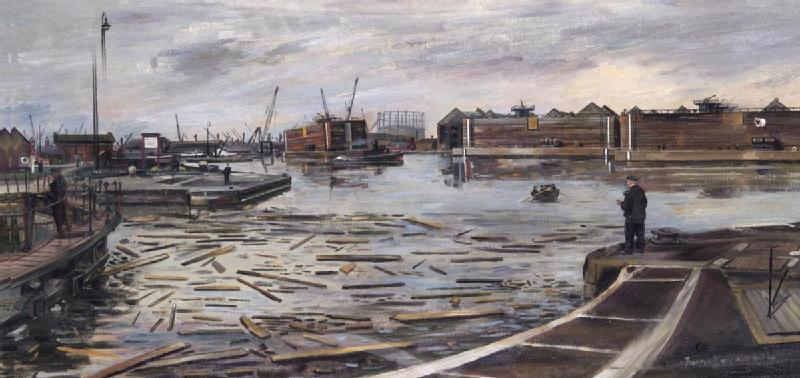
London Docks, Building Caissons for Mulberry (1944) by Frances Macdonald (Art.IWM ART LD 4039)

The WAAC was dissolved in December 1945 and its operations transferred to a joint committee of the Imperial War Museum and the Ministry of Information. When the Ministry of Information itself was disbanded in March 1946, WAAC's remaining responsibilities passed entirely to the Imperial War Museum. Whilst some artists were still finishing WAAC contracts and money was available to purchase works to fill any gaps in the collection, the major responsibility at this point was deciding how to disperse the collection. The collection now consisted of 5,570 works of art. By the end of 1947 these works had been distributed to some sixty museums, galleries, government departments and other bodies in Britain and around the world. Care was taken to ensure that works by the finest artists was distributed as widely as possible. For example, the twenty-seven drawings by Henry Moore of coal mines and the London Underground shelters went to eleven different museums and galleries while the hundred or so works by Graham Sutherland were placed with thirty different institutions. Over half the collection, some 3,000 items, was acquired by the Imperial War Museum, while the Tate took seventy-six pieces and the British Council some twenty-five works.

== WAAC artists ==
Thirty-six men and one woman were given full-time employment by the committee, a hundred other artists were given short-term contracts, and works by a further 264 artists, both professional and amateur, were purchased. Three artists donated works to the collection.

=== Artists on full-time salaried contracts ===
- Edward Ardizzone
- Edward Bawden
- Muirhead Bone
- Stephen Bone
- Henry Carr
- William Coldstream
- Leslie Cole
- Charles Cundall
- William Dring
- Evelyn Dunbar
- Richard Eurich
- Reginald Grenville Eves
- Barnett Freedman
- Anthony Gross
- Bernard Hailstone
- Keith Henderson
- Thomas Hennell
- Eric Kennington
- Henry Lamb
- Thomas Monnington
- James Morris
- Rodrigo Moynihan
- John Nash
- Paul Nash
- Mervyn Peake
- John Piper
- Roland Vivian Pitchforth
- John Platt
- Eric Ravilious
- Albert Richards
- Leonard Rosoman
- Rupert Shephard
- Graham Sutherland
- Alfred Thomson
- Carel Weight
- Charles Wheeler
- John Worsley

=== Artists given short-term WAAC contracts ===
- Rosemary Allan
- Leonard Appelbee
- John Armstrong
- Robert Austin
- Edward Baird
- Malcolm Baker-Smith
- James Bateman
- Walter Bayes
- Frank Beresford
- Oswald Birley
- David Bomberg
- Rodney Joseph Burn
- Thomas Carr
- Bernard Casson
- Evan Charlton
- Derek Chittock
- Dora Clarke
- William Clause
- Dorothy Coke
- Robert Colquhoun
- Philip Connard
- William Conor
- James Cowie
- Raymond Coxon
- Frank Barrington Craig
- Hugh Adam Crawford
- Terence Cuneo
- Robin Darwin
- Anthony Devas
- Frank Dobson
- Francis Dodd
- Paul Drury
- Thomas Cantrell Dugdale
- C.W. Dyson-Smith
- Ian G M Eadie
- Arthur John Ensor
- Jacob Epstein
- Vincent Evans
- Hubert Andrew Freeth
- Ethel Gabain
- Evelyn Gibbs
- Charles Ginner
- Duncan Grant
- James Ardern Grant
- Kenneth Grant
- Herbert James Gunn
- Robin Guthrie
- Allan Gwynne-Jones
- Patrick Hall
- A.S. Hartrick
- Norman Hepple
- Eliot Hodgkin
- Percy Horton
- Ray Howard-Jones
- Blair Hughes-Stanton
- Francis Ernest Jackson
- Edmond Xavier Kapp
- Mary Kessell
- Laura Knight
- Wyndham Lewis
- L.S. Lowry
- Lowes Dalbiac Luard
- Neville Lytton
- Frances Macdonald
- Alexander Macpherson
- Raymond McGrath
- Robert Medley
- Bernard Meninsky
- Paul Methuen
- James Miller
- Henry Moore
- Mona Moore
- Harry Morley
- W.P. Moss
- Cuthbert Orde
- Charles Pears
- Patrick E. Philips
- Elizabeth Polunin
- Patricia Preece
- William Roberts
- Claude Rogers
- Kenneth Rowntree
- Henry Rushbury
- Walter Russell
- Randolph Schwabe
- Peter Scott
- Robert Sivell
- John Skeaping
- Alan Sorrell
- Ruskin Spear
- Gilbert Spencer
- Stanley Spencer
- Steven Spurrier
- David Macbeth Sutherland
- Ernest Heber Thompson
- Alfred Thomson
- A.R. Middleton Todd
- Feliks Topolski
- John Laviers Wheatley
- Harold Sandys Williamson
- W. Matvyn Wright

=== Artists whose work was acquired by WAAC ===
- Enid Abrahams
- George Worsley Adamson
- Mary Adshead
- Edgar Ainsworth
- Griselda Allan
- Kathleen Allen
- Adrian Allinson
- Pegaret Anthony
- Joshua Armitage
- Michael Ayrton
- Joseph Bato
- Ivor Beddoes
- John Berry
- Paul Bird
- Douglas Robertson Bisset
- George Bissill
- Sam Black
- Doris Blair
- Robert Henderson Blyth
- James Boswell
- Norma Bull
- Charles Chaplin
- Malvina Cheek
- George Claessen
- John Kingsley Cook
- Edward Bainbridge Copnall
- Raymond Teague Cowern
- Leonard Daniels
- Paul Lucien Dessau
- Alan Durst
- Clifford Ellis
- Frederick William Elwell
- Simon Elwes
- Leila Faithfull
- John Farleigh
- Dennis Flanders
- Victorine Foot
- Michael Ford
- Mollie Forestier-Walker
- Meredith Frampton
- Thomas Freeth
- Roger Furse
- Abram Games
- Alfred Gerrard
- Kaff Gerrard
- Phyllis Ginger
- Grace Golden
- Tom Gourdie
- Kathleen Guthrie
- Karl Hagedorn
- Clifford Hall
- Thomas Symington Halliday
- Martin Hardie
- Colin Hayes
- Francis Helps
- Rose Henriques
- Elsie Dalton Hewland
- Francis Edwin Hodge
- Erlund Hudson
- Barbara Jones
- James Kenward
- Morris Kestelman
- Eve Kirk
- Edwin La Dell
- George Lambourn
- Nora Lavrin
- Olga Lehmann
- Richard Macdonald
- Frank H. Mason
- John Mansbridge
- Edgar Mansfield
- Reginald Mills
- Colin Moss
- Charles Mozley
- Richard Murry
- Edmund Nelson
- C.R.W. Nevinson
- Herbert Arnould Olivier
- Ivan Peries
- Christopher Perkins
- Louisa Puller
- Ceri Richards
- Leonard Richmond
- Michael Rothenstein
- William Rothenstein
- Stella Schmolle
- Edward Seago
- Ian Strang
- Eric Taylor
- Julian Trevelyan
- Henry Trivick
- Clive Uptton
- Keith Vaughan
- Paule Vezelay
- Sydney Curnow Vosper
- John Stanton Ward
- Katerina Wilczynski
- Norman Wilkinson
- Frank Wootton
- Ernest Worrall
- Anna Zinkeisen
- Doris Zinkeisen

== See also ==
- War artist
- British War Memorials Committee
