= Arthur John Ensor =

British-Canadian painter and industrial designer

- Born: 2 January 1905; Llanishen, Wales
- Died: 18 January 1995 (aged 90); Saanich, British Columbia, Canada
- Education: Accademia di Belle Arti di Firenze; Polytechnic School of Art; Royal College of Art
- Known for: Painter, industrial designer

Arthur John Ensor RCA (2 January 1905 – 18 January 1995) was a British-Canadian painter and industrial designer.

== Early life ==
Ensor was born in Llanishen, Wales on 2 January 1905. His parents moved to Canada when he was a child but he returned to Europe to study art, first in Florence at the Accademia di Belle Arti di Firenze and then in London at the Polytechnic School of Art before he graduated with a Diploma in Mural Painting and Art History from the Royal College of Art. After graduation, Ensor worked for the Empire Marketing Board before, in 1935, taking a post as an Industrial Designer for the Plastics Division of Imperial Chemical Industries.

== World War Two ==
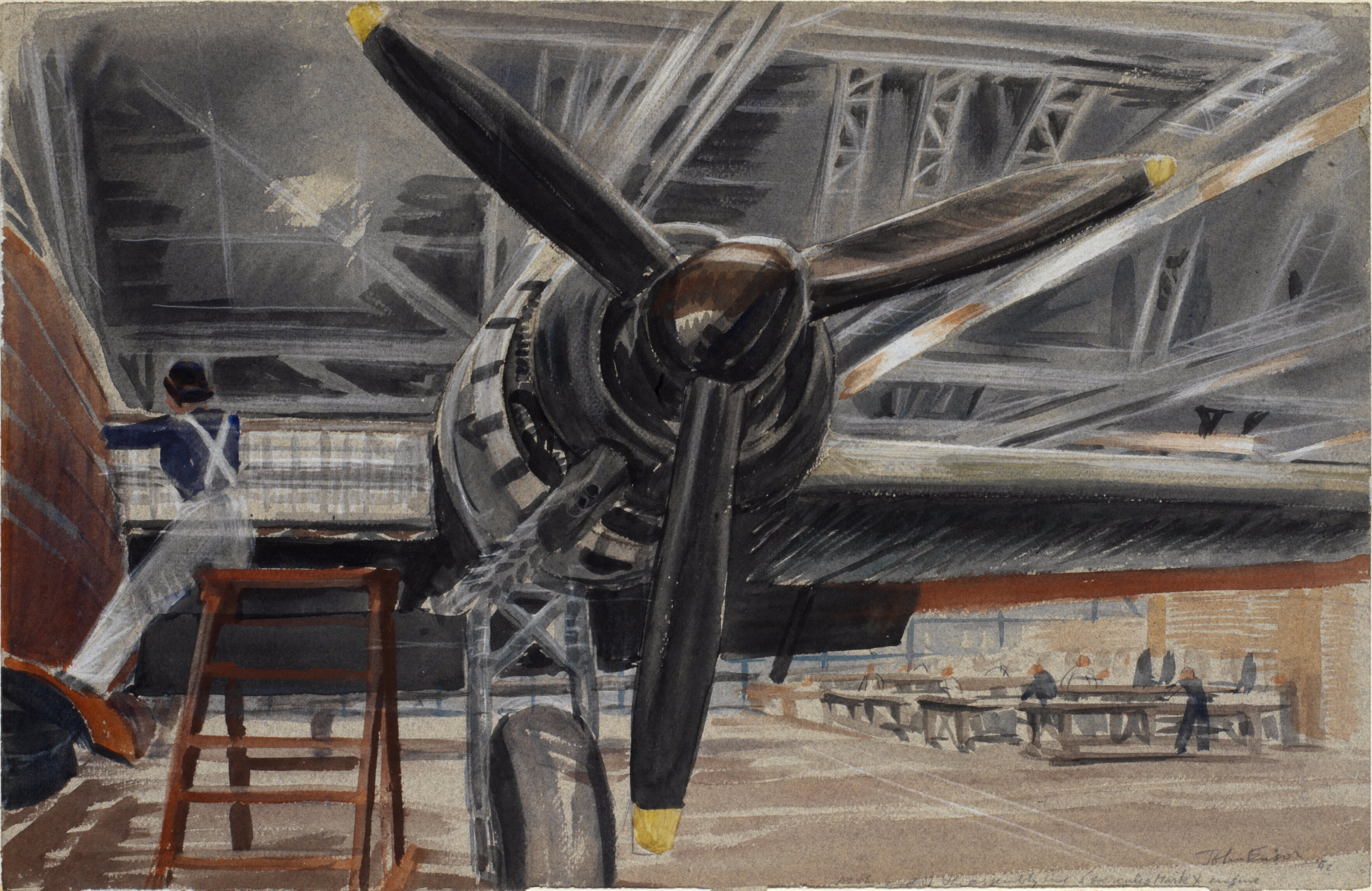
A Wellington Bomber awaiting Camouflage (1942) (Art.IWM ART LD 2605)

At the start of World War Two Ensor contacted the War Artists' Advisory Committee, WAAC, and he was eventually offered a short contract to record industrial scenes in the United Kingdom. By this time Ensor had already enlisted in the British Army and arrangements were made for him to produce four paintings in August 1942 before undertaking a drawing commission at the Vickers Armstrong Aircraft Assembly Works, where Vickers Wellington bombers were being built. Ensor submitted these pictures to WAAC in November 1942 and this led to a further commission at the John Summers & Sons steel plant which Ensor completed while on leave from the Army. During the war Ensor also recorded scenes of troop training, of oil drilling and of anti-aircraft and coastal defences.

== Later life ==
Ensor returned to Canada in 1947 where he established the Ensor Industrial Design Association and became a member of the Royal Canadian Academy of Art. In 1967, His painting, Summer Stores, was selected as the design for a 50 Cent Centennial Canada Post postage stamp. In the 1970s, he produced a series of watercolour paintings and coloured pencil sketches of the Royal Military College of Canada in Kingston, Ontario. These paintings, which are currently in the Beaverbrook Collection of War Art at the Canadian War Museum include scenes of officer cadets in various activities:

- Land Survey Crew
- Measuring Flow Resistance To A Solution Of Calcium Carbonate
- Calibrating Radar Waves, Electrical Engineering Department
- Football
- Map Making with Stereo Viewer

as well as architectural paintings of Massey Library, Sawyer building, Officer's mess and Fort Fredrick. Ensor's watercolour of RMC office cadets at the Halloween Ball, Halloween Ball, Royal Military College, Kingston, is in the collection of Library and Archives Canada.

Arthur John Ensor died in Saanich, British Columbia on 18 January 1995. His work is represented in major museums and public galleries throughout Canada.
