= Katerina Wilczynski =

Polish painter, printmaker and illustrator (1894-1978)

- Born: 7 July 1894; Poznań, Poland
- Died: 1978 (aged 83–84)
- Known for: Artist, printmaker & illustrator

Katerina Wilczynski (7 July 1894 – 1978) was a 20th-century painter, print maker and illustrator. She was born in Poland but spent a large part of her career in Britain and Italy. Wilczynski painted portraits and cityscapes throughout her career, but is best known as a landscape artist.

== Biography ==
Wilczynski was born in Poznań, Poland, but spent extended periods of her early life in Berlin. She studied art in Leipzig in 1916 and 1917 and then in Berlin during 1918 before moving to Paris where she undertook some freelance work. In 1930, Wilczynski won a Prix de Rome scholarship and used the funding to move to that city. While in Rome she drew several churches and monuments, before in 1939, she moved to London. During the Second World War, Wilczynski drew buildings and landmarks damaged by bombing and contributed pieces to the war artists exhibitions held in the National Gallery. At least one of these works was purchased by the War Artists' Advisory Committee.

After the War, Wilczynski travelled extensively, especially in Greece and Italy. An exhibition of her Greek portraits and landscapes was held in at the Ansdell Gallery in 1970. Drawings by Wilczynski appeared in several books including Daphnis and Chloe, Homage to Greece and The Love Songs of Sappho. Artworks by her are held in public collections in both Dresden, Cologne and in London at the Victoria and Albert Museum and the National Portrait Gallery.
