= Henry Carr (artist) =

British artist (1894–1970)

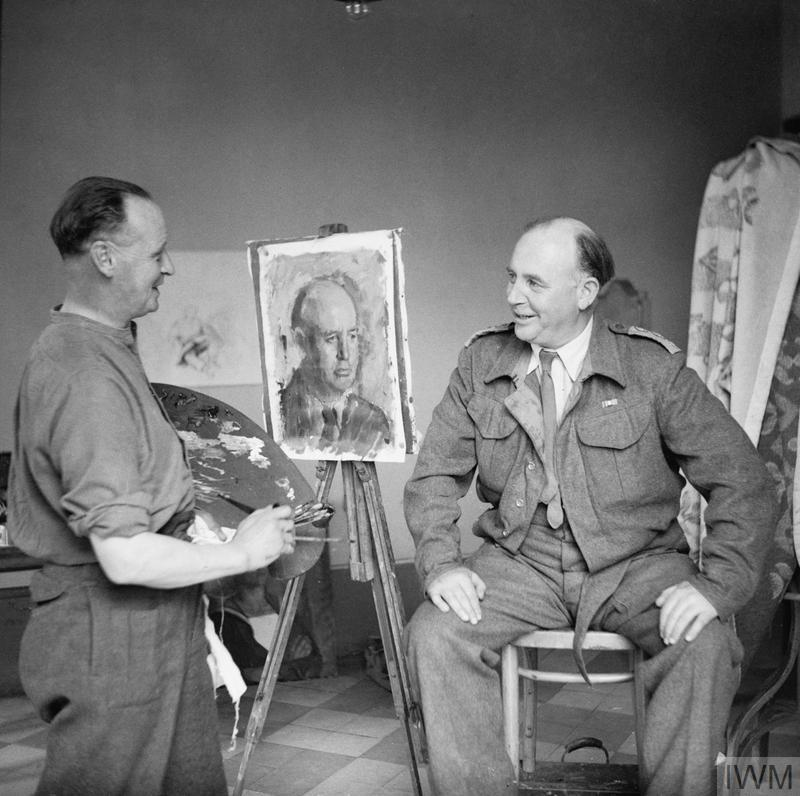
- Carr painting a portrait of Edward Ardizzone
- Born: 16 August 1894; Leeds, England
- Died: 16 March 1970 (aged 75); South Kensington, London
- Education: Leeds College of Art; Royal College of Art
- Known for: Painting, drawing

Henry Marvell Carr, RA RP RBA, (16 August 1894 – 16 March 1970) was a successful British landscape and portrait painter who served as a war artist during World War II.

== Early life ==
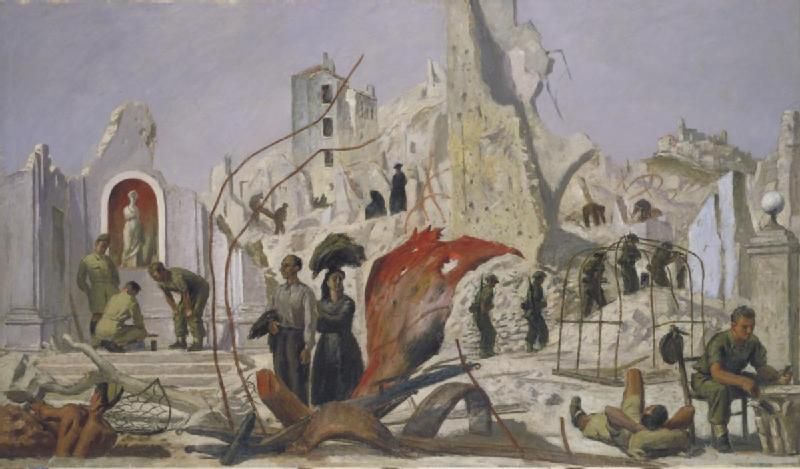
Liberation (Art.IWM ART LD 4515)

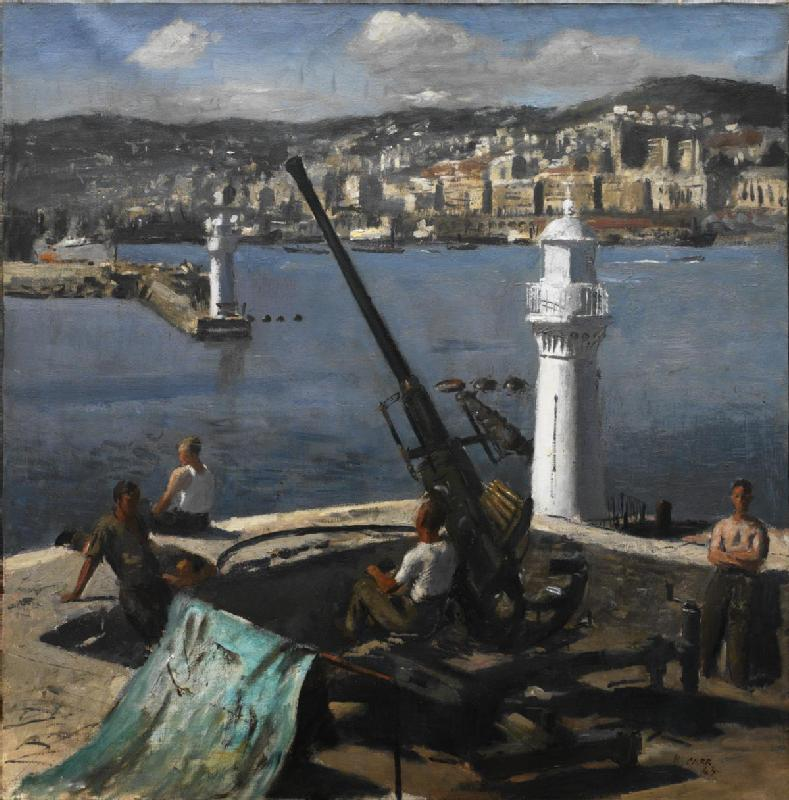
A Bofors Gun, Algiers (Art.IWM ART LD 2964)

Carr was born in Leeds and trained at Leeds College of Art and the Royal College of Art, under William Rothenstein. During World War I he served in France with the Royal Field Artillery. After the war his work was exhibited at the Royal Academy in 1921, in other British galleries and in Paris. He painted portraits of, among others, Aldous Huxley and Olivia Davis and landscapes of the English south coast.

== World War II ==
At the outbreak of World War II, Carr was offered commissions by the War Artists' Advisory Committee to paint scenes of bomb damage in London, both to landmarks such as St Pancras railway station and St Clement Danes Church and to housing in the suburbs. An exhibition of his war paintings was held at the National Gallery in July 1940. Carr's own home and studio were destroyed in the Blitz. A trip on a British merchant navy ship resulted in the paintings The Merchant Navy:The Chain Locker and Merchant Seaman Fireman. In 1943 Carr became a full-time, salaried, War Office Artist and travelled first to North Africa and then to Italy. As well as portraits of Allied soldiers and officers, he painted military actions and landscapes in Algiers, Tunis, Cassino and Sessa in Italy. In 1944, he witnessed, and painted, an eruption of Mount Vesuvius. Later in 1944 he left Italy after becoming ill.

== Post-war career ==
After the war, Carr resumed his career as a portrait painter. In 1948 he was elected a Fellow of the Royal Society of Portrait Painters and in 1956 he was awarded the Gold Medal at the Paris Salon. In 1952, Carr published the book Portrait Painting. Between 1957 and 1959 he produced a series of fourteen murals, showing the stages of textile production for the Salts Mill. Carr taught at Beckenham Art School for some seventeen years and became Head of the School. Carr was a member of the Royal Society of British Artists. He was elected an Associate Member of the Royal Academy in 1957 and a full member in 1966 and continued to exhibit there until his death. Some seventy works by him are held by the Imperial War Museum.
