= Eric Taylor (artist) =

English painter (1909–1999)

Eric Wilfred Taylor
- Born: 6 August 1909; London
- Died: 1999 (aged 89–90)
- Education: Royal College of Art
- Known for: Painting

Eric Wilfred Taylor (6 August 1909 – 1999) was a British artist and teacher. Although he had a long career encompassing painting, printmaking and the production of sculptures, murals, and ceramics, he is now perhaps best known for the works he created during the Second World War and in particular the paintings he produced when he was among the British troops that liberated the Bergen-Belsen concentration camp.

== Biography ==
Taylor was born in London, went to school in Hampstead and studied art at the Royal College of Art. In 1935 he was awarded a prize at the International Print Exhibition in Chicago. Taylor worked as a visiting lecturer at both the Camberwell School of Art and at the Willesden School of Art from 1936 until the start of the Second World War.

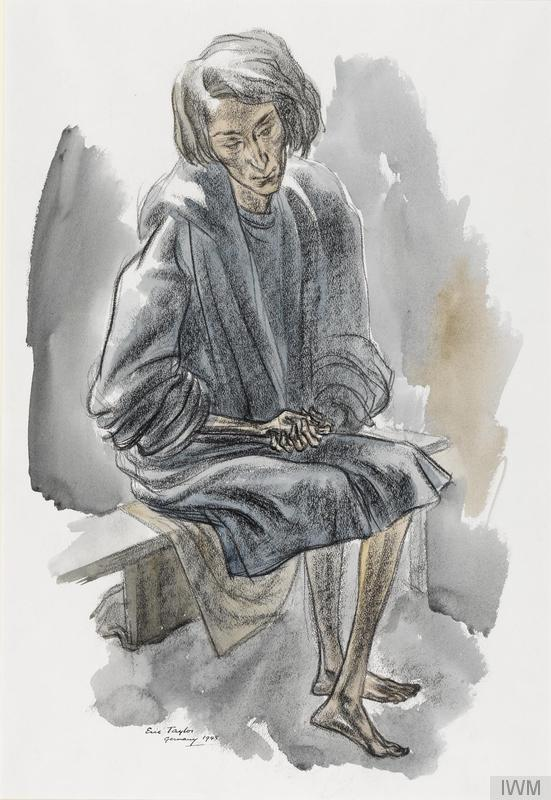
Liberated from Belsen Concentration Camp, 1945 (1945) (Art.IWM ART LD 5586)

In 1939 Taylor enlisted in the British Army and eventually served as a sergeant in the Royal Artillery and Royal Engineers. He took part in the Allied invasion of Europe and the subsequent advance across France, the Netherlands and then into Germany. During the Allied advance, although not an official war artist, Taylor sketched when his military duties allowed. He depicted groups of refugees, members of the Dutch resistance and the aftermath of the Battle of the Falaise Gap. At Neumünster he was allowed to sketch the Nazi leader Alfred Rosenberg in his prison cell shortly after his capture.

In April 1945, Taylor's unit was among the first troops to enter the Bergen-Belsen concentration camp. Taylor painted a number of watercolours at the camp. Initially, his compositions showed massed piles of bodies but increasingly he turned to depicting individual survivors. The War Artists' Advisory Committee purchased several of his wartime pictures and they are now held by the Imperial War Museum. Nine of Taylor's paintings from Bergen Belsen are held at the Wiener Holocaust Library in London. In 1997, Taylor presented 26 examples of his World War Two paintings to the library at Leeds University.

After the war, Taylor resumed teaching at the Willesden School of Art and also worked at the Central School of Art. In 1949, he left both posts and moved to Leeds to become head of the design school at the Leeds College of Art. In 1956 he was promoted to principal of the college, and when parts of that college became part of Leeds Polytechnic in 1969, he became a deputy director of that institution. He held that post until his retirement in 1971. In 1965 Taylor completed a large mosaic mural for an outside wall of the Merrion Shopping Centre in Leeds. In 2015 these murals were renovated and relocated to a position at the Leeds College of Art.

Taylor exhibited at the Royal Academy, the New English Art Club and the London Group and had a number of solo shows, mostly in the north of England.
