= Doris Blair =

British artist (1915-2011)

Doris Violet Blair
- Born: 1915; Belfast, Northern Ireland
- Died: 2011 (aged 95–96)
- Education: Belfast College of Art; Royal College of Art
- Known for: Painting

Doris Violet Blair (later Bourguignon; 1915-2011) was a British painter known for her depictions of life in Northern Ireland during World War II.

== Biography ==
Blair was born in Belfast and studied at the Belfast College of Art and at the Royal College of Art. During World War II she worked for the Ministry of Information in the Postal Censorship department. Blair also painted scenes of bomb damage in Belfast and portraits of some of the British and American troops stationed there. Furthermore, she submitted a proposal to the War Artists' Advisory Committee to record the activities of women who had entered the industrial workforce for the war effort. The WAAC Committee didn't act on that proposal but later in the conflict did purchase a number of watercolours from Blair depicting women officers.

After the war, Blair had a solo exhibition of her work in 1948 at the Belfast Museum and Art Gallery. Leaving Belfast she studied in New York under the painter Wallace Harrison and then in Paris with Fernand Léger and André Lhote. By 1975, Blair was living in Belgium and, working in a largely abstract style, she had a solo show in Brussels. During the 1990s, Blair settled in London and continued to paint, mostly working in acrylics. In 1982 the Ulster Museum acquired a collection of her watercolours from World War II.
