= Eva Frankfurther =

German-born British artist (1930-1959)

- Born: 10 February 1930; Dahlem, Berlin
- Died: January 1959, aged 28; Paddington, London
- Education: Saint Martin's School of Art
- Known for: Portrait painting

Eva Frankfurther (10 February 1930 – January 1959) was a German-born British artist known for her depictions of the immigrant communities of the East End of London in the 1950s.

== Biography ==
Frankfurther was born in the Dahlem district of Berlin to a Jewish family. Her father, Paul, was a businessman while her mother, Henriette, was an economics graduate. Henriette died of cancer 18 months after Eva was born and her father remarried in 1934. The family fled to Britain in 1939 to avoid persecution under the Nazis. The children, Eva and her two siblings, left Berlin six months before their parents and spent some time in Haslemere, being looked after by German refugee teachers, before their parents arrived in England during August 1939. The family rented a flat in Belsize Park Gardens but Frankfurther and her sister were evacuated to Hertfordshire in World War II to avoid the bombing of London.

After the War, Frankfurther enrolled in Saint Martin's School of Art in 1947. There she studied life drawing under Roland Vivian Pitchforth and was held in great esteem by her fellow students, who included Leon Kossoff and Frank Auerbach. As a student, Frankfurther had spent some summers in America. After graduating in 1951, she visited Italy, where she painted numerous portraits of street beggars and pilgrims, and then, briefly, Paris. Returning to England, Frankfurther took herself away from the central London art scene, and her family home, and moved to the East End of the city. She lived in a basement flat in Whitechapel and took an evening job, working as a counter-hand and dish-washer at the J. Lyons and Co. Corner House restaurant in Piccadilly. This allowed her time to paint during the day. Frankfurther spent five years working at the Corner House and painted several portraits of her fellow workers, including the double portrait West Indian Waitresses. Frankfurther also painted portraits of the local East End population. As well as depicting members of the long established Jewish East End community, she also sketched and painted people from the Pakistani, West Indian and Irish communities then arriving in the area. She left the Corner House in 1956 and took a job at the Tate & Lyle sugar refinery at Victoria Dock. Frankfurther left that job in 1957 and lived in Israel for several months. She returned to London in 1959 where, suffering from depression, she took her own life.

During her life, Frankfurther only appears to have exhibited locally in the East End, mainly at the Whitechapel Gallery, though she did feature in a group exhibition at the Ben Uri Gallery in 1956. The same gallery hosted a memorial exhibition in 1962 and included examples of her work in their 2014 Refiguring the 50s exhibition and held a one-person show of her work in 2017.

== Exhibitions ==
Posthumous exhibitions:

- 1962, Ben Uri Gallery
- 1979, Clare College, Cambridge
- 1980, Bedford Central Library
- 1981, Margaret Fisher Gallery, London
- 2001, Boundary Gallery, London
- 2026, Kunsthaus Dahlem, Berlin
