= Malvina Cheek =

British artist

- Born: 8 July 1915; Hampton on Thames, England
- Died: 22 May 2016 (aged 100)
- Education: Wimbledon School of Art; Royal College of Art
- Known for: Painting, drawing

Malvina Cheek, A.R.C.A., (8 July 1915 – 22 May 2016) was a British artist, best known for her work during World War II for the Recording Britain project. During the War she was commissioned for Recording Britain to make architectural records of old buildings in anticipation of their possible destruction. Eighteen finished works were presented to the scheme and her legacy is also preserved in many books.

== Early life ==
Malvina Cheek was born at Hampton on Thames, the younger of two daughters of Percy Ebsworth Cheek, a banker with Glynn Mills, later Coutts (died 1954) and Jessie, née Cross. Her Christian name comes down through her paternal family originating with a Belgian ancestor. After leaving St Philomena’s, a Catholic school near Carshalton, she studied at Wimbledon School of Art and then at the Royal College of Art. Like many students of her generation she was influenced by the draftsman and engraver Robert Sargent Austin.

Cheek gained her RCA Diploma in 1938. She taught for two days a week at the Central School of Art and was evacuated with the school to Luton during the Second World War. In Luton she continued to teach and also worked for a Blood Transfusion Unit at the local hospital, later moving to St Albans, where the art school was rapidly establishing itself as a centre of excellence. She would return to London for the weekend, a hazardous journey since there had to be total darkness on the trains to comply with the Blackout restrictions.

== World War Two ==
An introduction to Arnold Palmer resulted in Cheek receiving several commissions from the Recording Britain project: the counties she was allocated included Bedfordshire, Hertfordshire, Cheshire, Derbyshire, Staffordshire and Cornwall. The Victoria & Albert Museum holds 14, while three Bedfordshire and one Cornish watercolour are still missing. Cheek was especially intrigued by Mow Cop, below the hill on which Primitive Methodism was founded in 1810.

The numerous participating artists in the scheme exhibited at the National Gallery, which had been emptied of its own collection. These exhibitions and the handsome four volume hardback set published just after the war by the Oxford University Press, partly financed by the Pilgrim Trust from the USA, enhanced these artists' reputations both at home and abroad. In 1943 and 1944 Cheek exhibited at the Royal Academy, where a painting entitled Blood Donors was sold but unfortunately its present location is not known. In September 1944 the War Artists' Advisory Committee purchased, for six guineas, the picture Suburban Flying-bomb Damage from Cheek.

In 1945 a painting entitled Study of American soldiers standing outside, the Rainbow Corner, North London, was sold to James Bussy of Sheffield. Her work in portraiture continued apace and one of the most characteristic paintings, which remained in her own collection, was that of her father, Percy Ebsworth Cheek, in his ARP helmet. She described how everyone was so debilitated towards the end of war – “not eating properly didn’t help their health and confidence was extremely shaken”.

== Post-war ==
After the War, two further topographical books, illustrated by her exclusively, were published for the Visions of England series by Paul Elek: The Black Country, by Walter Allen in 1946 and Derbyshire, by Nellie Kirkham, in 1947. In 1944, Cheek began to teach at St Albans School of Art, in what was considered to be a very informal art college: in 1947 she was appointed to teach permanently in the painting school, usually the preserve of men. She continued to teach there until she became, briefly, a full-time senior lecturer in the Graphic Design School at Twickenham College of Technology.

Cheek settled in Hampstead. There, her continued enthusiasm for the initiative set by Recording Britain, led her to sketch many local London vistas. Two particularly fine examples are Bombed Building, Weatherall House, Well Walk NW3 being knocked down of 1948 and Hampstead Heath Station and Magdala Pub 1949 are now in the collection of the Hampstead Museum at Burgh House, just up the hill from where her family still live. Cheek shared a house on Church Row in Hampstead village with fellow artist Olive Cook in the late 1940s.

In 1950, she was asked to design the sets for The Atom Secrets, a play for the toy theatre by George Speaight. To commemorate this Pollock’s Museum Trust published a greetings card showing The Cabin of the Lucy for Scene III in 2003, with the encouragement of Alan Powers. Cheek contributed illustrations to articles in various magazines, notably Far and Wide. In 1952 she wrote and illustrated an article on ships' figureheads for Collins Magazine.

Cheek became a member of the Society of Industrial Artists, Illustrators Group (MSIA) in 1957, having contributed to their Biennial review in 1949. Amongst her early students from St Albans as well as Ronald Maddox was David Gentleman, and from various other establishments were John Raynes, Stanley Smith, Albany Wiseman and Ian Sidaway. Cheek also exhibited in the Allied International Artists (AIA) group exhibitions, with the Royal Society of British Artists, the Royal Watercolour Society and the New English Art Club.

== Painting Styles ==
Fresh, primary colours characterise her work of the 60s and 70s: highlights of red abound in her still lifes and portraits: pots of geraniums, a summer hat, the costume of an Indian wooden marionette. Trees were always important sources of subject matter, the pear tree in the garden of Christchurch Hill features from the moment they moved to Hampstead. In her later career a series of large canvases, painted with a rich brownish palette reflect her interest in spiritualism, Freud and Jung in particular. While she was growing up her father had not encouraged a religious leaning in his household and she may have found an equally cool reception from her husband, an atheist, for this work but there is an unmistakable passion/ambition therein.

In 2009 an anthology of her poems, The Silent Fairground was published and a review written by Piers Plowright for the Camden New Journal. In autumn of 2013 an exhibition was held at Burgh House.
