= Derek Chittock =

British painter (1922-1986)

- Born: 21 February 1922
- Died: 21 February 1986 (aged 64)
- Education: Slade School of Fine Art; Royal Academy Schools
- Known for: Painting

Derek Chittock (21 February 1922 – 21 February 1986) was a British art critic, art historian and portrait painter. He was also active as a cartoonist, creating the gag comics Benny and Barley Bottom in the late 1950s, early 1960s.

== Biography ==
Chittock studied at the Slade School of Art between 1942 and 1947 under Randolph Schwabe and continued his art education under Philip Connard at the Royal Academy schools. Although still a student at the time, Chittock was commissioned by the War Artists' Advisory Committee to paint two portraits of Admiralty subjects near the end of World War Two. Chittock was a member of the Communist Party of Great Britain and in the early 1950s was recruited by the Artists' International Association to serve on the selection committee for their Artists for Peace exhibitions. Chittock also worked as the art critic for the Daily Worker newspaper. He resigned that post, and his membership of the Communist Party, in 1956 following the Soviet invasion of Hungary. Chittock, who sometimes signed his work as James Dudley, completed several covers for the magazine John Bull.

Chittock, who at times painted in the Socialist realism style, exhibited at the Royal Academy, the New English Art Club and for long periods lived in Hertfordshire and Sevenoaks.
