= Elsie Dalton Hewland =

British painter (1901–1979)

- Born: 23 November 1901
- Died: 1979 (aged 77–78)
- Known for: Painting

Elsie Dalton Hewland (23 November 1901 – 1979) was a British artist, who painted figure and genre subjects and is now known for her images of British life during World War II.

== Biography ==
Hewland was born and grew up in the north of England. She attended Sheffield School of Art between 1921 and 1924 before spending four years at the Royal Academy schools. At the RA, between 1926 and 1930, she won both the British Institute and Landseer Scholarships. During World War II she painted a number of works depicting life on the British Home Front. These included scenes of nurseries provided for the children of war workers and images of fighter aircraft being built and repaired. Several of these were acquired by the War Artists' Advisory Committee and are now held by the Imperial War Museum in London. The critic Eric Newton highlighted her work in his 1945 survey of British war art, War Through Artists Eyes'.

After the war, Hewland worked as a medical illustrator. She regularly exhibited at the Royal Academy and with the Royal Watercolour Society. She lived for many years at Chalfont St. Giles and then at Ventnor on the Isle of Wight.
