= A. R. Middleton Todd =

English painter (1891–1966)

A.R. Middleton Todd
- Born: 26 October 1891; Helston, England
- Died: 21 November 1966 (aged 75)
- Education: Central School of Arts & Crafts; Slade School of Fine Art
- Known for: Portrait painting

Arthur Ralph Middleton Todd RA RE (26 October 1891 – 21 November 1966) was a British artist. He was a member of the Royal Academy and well known as a portrait painter in the 1920s and 1930s.

== Biography ==
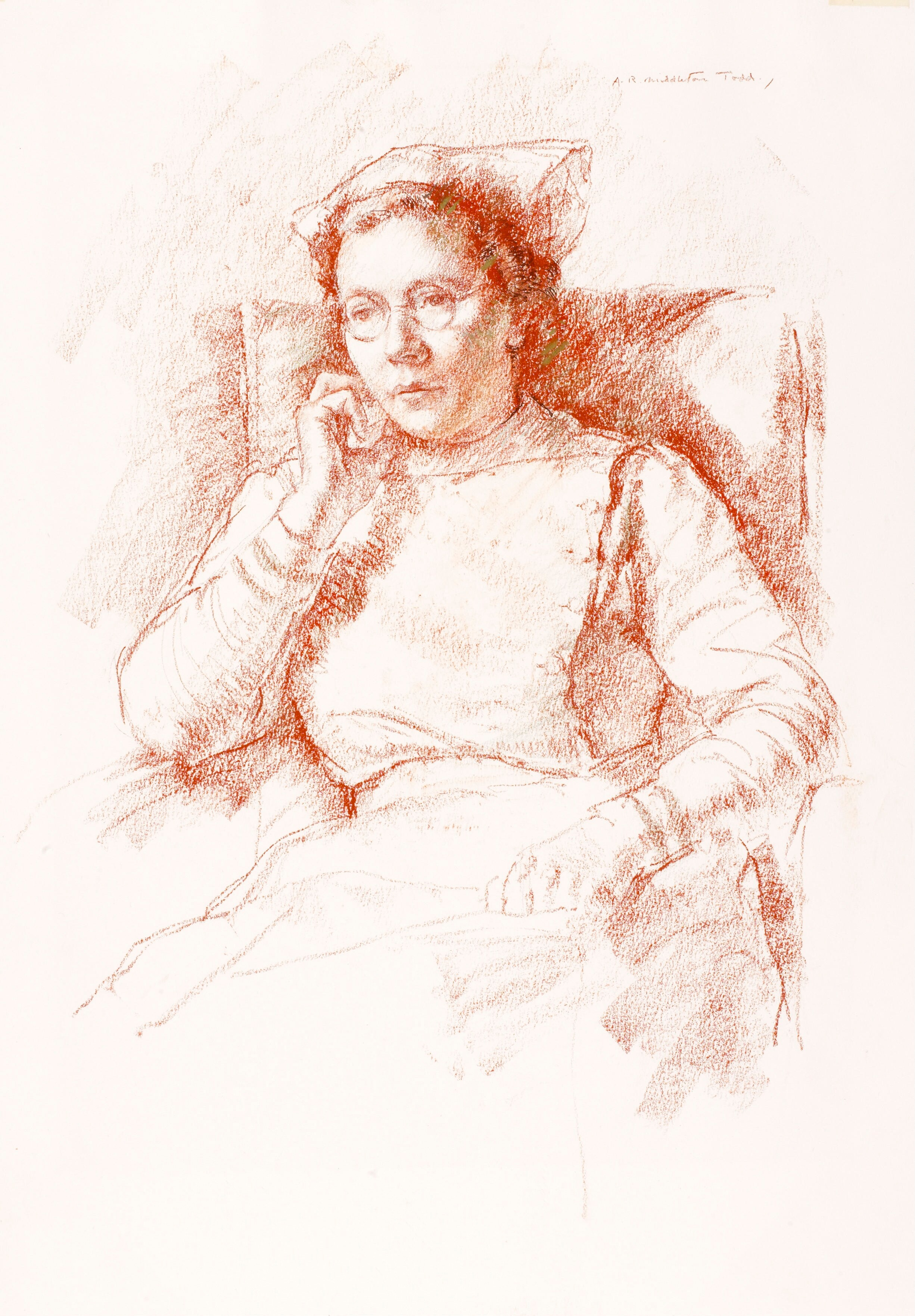
Miss Marjorie Bayes - A State Certified Midwife (Art. IWM ART LD 2563)

Todd was born in Helston in Cornwall. His father, Ralph Todd (1856–1932) was a successful artist who taught at the Central School of Arts & Crafts in London. The younger Todd received art tuition from Stanhope Forbes in Newlyn before attending the Central School as a student. Todd served in the British Army during the First World War as a driver with the Army Service Corps. After the War, Todd had a picture exhibited at the Royal Academy in 1918. He enrolled at the Slade School of Fine Art and was there throughout 1920 and 1921. When he left the Slade, Todd travelled throughout France, Holland and Italy. Returning to Britain, Todd established himself as a successful artist becoming known for his portraits and his pastel and etching works.

Todd's 1939 painting The Picture Book was acquired for the Tate collection in 1940. During the Second World War, Todd received a number of short-term commissions from the War Artists' Advisory Committee to depict individuals serving on the British Home Front.

Throughout his career, Todd held a number of teaching posts, most notably as a tutor at the Royal Academy Schools between 1946 and 1949, but also as the master of the life class at the Regent Street Polytechnic in 1939 and as head of drawing and painting at the Leicester School of Art between 1936 and 1939. Todd's last teaching post was at City and Guilds of London Art School in Kensington from 1950 to 1956.

== Memberships ==
Todd was a member of, or affiliated with, the following organisations:

- 1923: Elected associate member of Royal Society of Painter-Etchers and Engravers,
- 1929: Elected associate of the Royal Watercolour Society,
- 1930: Elected Fellow of Royal Society of Painter-Etchers and Engravers,
- 1937: Elected member of the Royal Watercolour Society,
- 1939: Elected associate of the Royal Academy,
- 1945: Member, New English Art Club,
- 1949: Elected full member of the Royal Academy.
- 1958: Elected member of Royal Society of Portrait Painters
