= Colin Hayes (artist) =

British artist (1919–2003)

Colin Graham Frederick Hayes
- Born: 17 November 1919; London
- Died: 1 November 2003 (aged 83); London
- Education: Christ Church, Oxford; Bath School of Art; Ruskin School of Drawing
- Known for: Art teacher and painter

Colin Graham Frederick Hayes RA RBA (17 November 1919 – 1 November 2003) was a British artist who worked in both oils and watercolours and who, through his teaching and his books, influenced several highly renowned younger artists.

== Biography ==
Hayes was born in London. His father, Gerald was a mathematician and musicologist while his mother, Winifred, was a painter and sculptor. Hayes was educated at Westminster School before reading history at Christ Church, Oxford.

At the start of the Second World War, Hayes joined the British Army and served in the Royal Engineers with Field Survey Units in Iceland and Egypt. He was wounded while in north Africa and returned to England in 1943 before serving in north-western Europe after the Normandy landings until he was invalided out of the Army in 1945.

After the war, Hayes began studying formally art, first at the Bath School of Art and then at the Ruskin School of Drawing during 1946 and 1947 in Oxford. In 1947 he was appointed head of painting at Cheltenham Ladies' College but left in 1949 when offered a post at the Royal College of Art, RCA. In time Hayes became a Senior Tutor, then Reader and Fellow at the RCA and in all taught there until 1984. Alongside many notable colleagues, such as Ruskin Spear and John Minton, Hayes influenced the artistic development of a generation of students that included David Hockney, Peter Blake, Patrick Caulfield and R. B. Kitaj. After retiring from the RCA, Hayes remained an honorary member of the college and, later, taught at the City & Guilds School of Art in London.

In 1962 Hayes was elected to the council of the Royal Society of British Artists, RBA, having exhibited with them several times previously. He served as president of the RBA from 1993 to 1998. He used this role to promote the re-establishment of teaching the formal elements and methods in art education. Hayes exhibited on a regular basis until the end of his life, with exhibitions at both Agnews and the New Grafton Gallery in London. He travelled widely in Greece, Tibet and India and he often used bright colours and strong patterns in his paintings. In 1963 he became an associate member of the Royal Academy and in 1970 was elected a full member.

Examples of watercolours made by Hayes in north Africa during World War Two were purchased by the War Artists' Advisory Committee and are now in the collection of the Imperial War Museum. The Arts Council England, the British Council and the Government Art Collection also hold examples of his paintings.

== Published works ==
- Renior, 1961
- Stanley Spencer, 1963
- Rembrandt, 1969
- Ruskin Spear
- A Grammar of Drawing.
