= Enid Abrahams =

British artist (1906–1972)

- Born: 1906; London, United Kingdom
- Died: 1972 (aged 65–66); London, United Kingdom
- Education: St John's Wood Art School; Royal Academy Schools

Enid Dreyfus (née Abrahams; 1906 – 1972) was a British painter. Born in London, she exhibited regularly in her home town including at the Leicester Galleries, New English Art Club, and Royal Society of British Artists. She is best known for her works depicting life during World War II, captured during her time as a volunteer in the Auxiliary Fire Service in London.

== Biography ==
Abrahams was born into a Jewish family in Hendon, London in 1906. After studying art, she exhibited regularly across London in her twenties. At the outbreak of the Second World War, Abrahams became involved in the volunteering effort in London. In 1939, she joined the Auxiliary Fire Service as a driver and began in Hampstead, later moving to Bethnal Green. She continued to engage with art between her shifts, sketching vignettes of life during the war. She also organised clubs and drove a field kitchen in Stepney.

After the conclusion of the war, she married Charles Hipolyte Dreyfus (1911–2008) in 1947, after which point she authored herself as Enid Dreyfus. Unusually, some of her later work is signed with her married name Dreyfus on one side and maiden name Abrahams on the other. Dreyfus died in London in 1972.

== Career ==
Enid Abrahams: The Five Pound Piano - Firemen at Bethnal Green Fire Station, London, c. 1941, ink on paper

Abrahams studied at the St John's Wood Art School, and later at the Royal Academy Schools from July 1927–June 1932. During and after her studies at the Royal Academy she exhibited regularly from 1930–1944, including at the Leicester Galleries, New English Art Club, Royal Institute of Oil Painters, Royal Society of British Artists, and at the Royal Academy's summer shows. Her still life at the New English Art Club was commended by The Jewish Chronicle as "exceptionally attractive arrangement of colour and tone beautifully painted".

Abrahams produced her best known work during World War II, when she volunteered in the Auxiliary Fire Service (AFS) in London. At the outbreak of the war the UK government created the War Artists' Advisory Committee (WAAC) to commission artists, but the vast majority of salaried positions were male - as a result, many female artists including Abrahams documented events with portable materials like pencil and charcoal. Much of her inspiration was drawn from her work and colleagues in the AFS, capturing informal and intimate moments including firewomen sleeping between shifts and a group of firemen attempting to repair a piano. In August 1941, her depiction of the National Fire Service responding to a call sold to the WAAC for six guineas. She was also one of the few women to have work exhibited at the Firemen Artists’ exhibitions during the war.

After the war she continued to exhibit, including four times at the Royal Academy from 1948–1956, and at the Imperial War Museum in 1958. Following her death her work continued to appear in exhibitions about the war, and examples of her work are held in the Imperial War Museum, Ben Uri Gallery & Museum, Royal Air Force Museum, and Guildhall Art Gallery.

== Works ==
- Firewomen Resting, London Blitz, (c. 1941)
- Two Sleeping Soldiers (c. 1941)
- The Five Pound Piano – Firemen at Bethnal Green Fire Station, London Blitz (c. 1941)
- Bells! A Unit of the National Fire Service Answering a Call (c. 1941)
- St Paul's from Warwick Lane, London (c. 1960s)
- Welsh Chapel (1968)

== External ==
6 artworks by or after Enid Abrahams at the Art UK site
