= Francis Edwin Hodge =

British artist

Francis Edwin Hodge (December 1881 – 6 February 1949) was an English painter.

== Biography ==
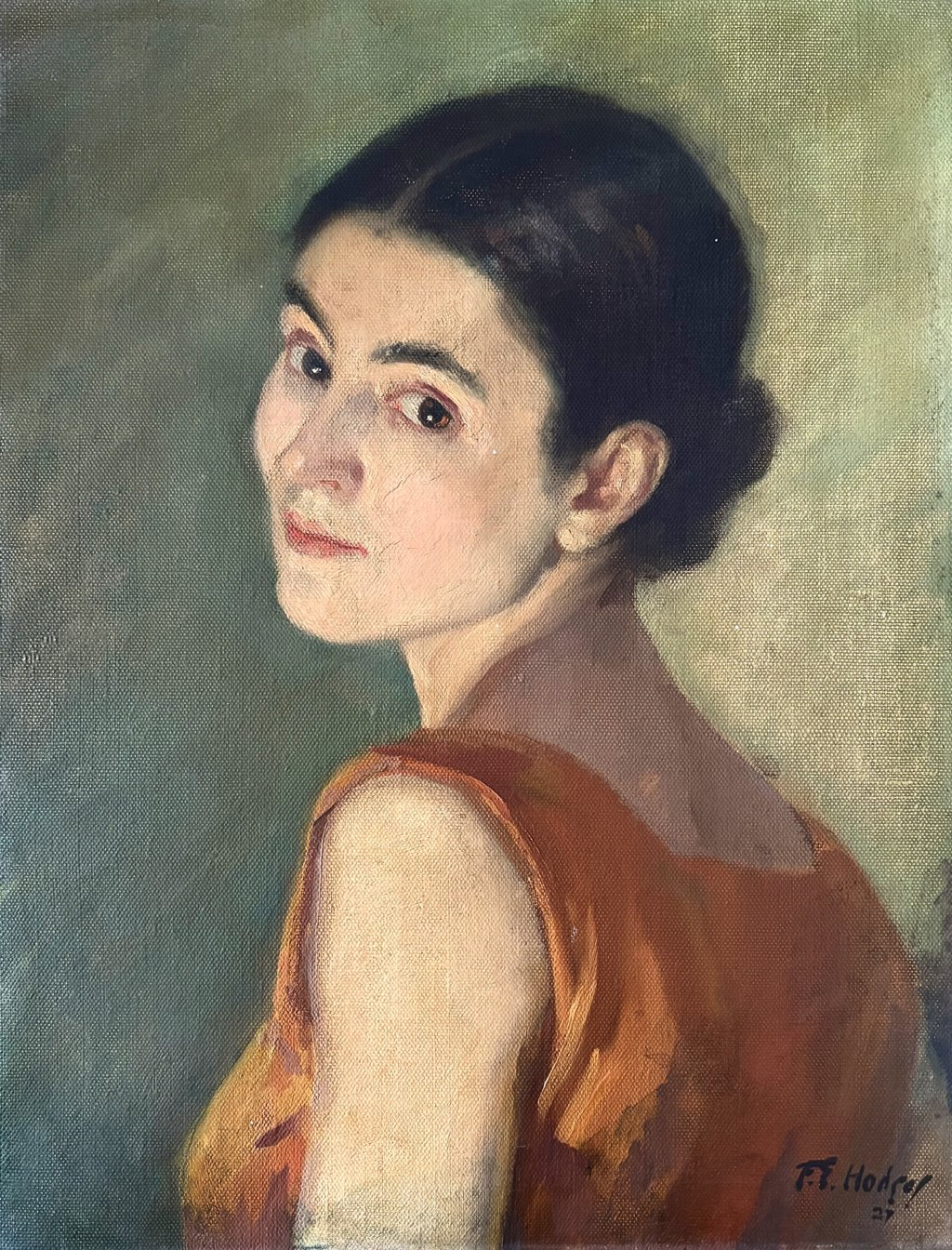
In the lamplight, 1927

Born in Devon, England, Hodge studied at the Westminster School of Art and the Slade School of Fine Art. Among his other teachers were Augustus John, William Orpen and Frank Brangwyn and he also studied for a short time in Paris. Hodge enlisted in the Artists' Rifles at the start of World War I and served as a captain in the Royal Field Artillery on the Western Front. He continued to paint during the conflict and some of those paintings are now held by the Imperial War Museum. His work was entered to the painting event in the art competition at the 1932 Summer Olympics. During World War II, the War Artists' Advisory Committee purchased examples of his work.

In August 1914 Hodge married Lily Ireland in Chelsea. His second wife was Myfanwy Hazel Dunlop, who he married in 1938.

Hodge died on 6 February 1949. He is buried in Brompton Cemetery in Chelsea.

== Membership ==
Hodge was a member of or affiliated with the following organisations:

- 1915: Elected to the Royal Society of British Artists,
- 1927: Elected member of Royal Institute of Oil Painters,
- 1929: Elected member of the Royal Society of Portrait Painters,
- 1931: Elected member of the Royal Institute of Painters in Watercolours

Hodge was also a member of the Chelsea Arts Club.
