= Kathleen Allen =

British artist (1906-1983)

- Born: 1906; Chiswick, London, England
- Died: 1983 (aged 76–77)
- Education: Royal College of Art; Slade School of Art
- Known for: Painting

Kathleen Saywell Allen (1906–1983) was a British painter, muralist, designer and art teacher. Allen is known for her urban landscapes and, in particular, scenes depicting post-war rebuilding in London.

== Biography ==
Allen was born in the Chiswick area of London and, due to a prolonged childhood illness, was home-schooled until she was 14 years old, when she attended Bromley Country School for Girls between 1920 and 1924. Eventually she enrolled in the Royal College of Art. Upon graduating from the RCA in 1928, Allen taught art in a number of schools in London and the Midlands before spending time painting murals in Kent and Warwickshire. In 1936 she returned to London to set up a studio in Fetter Lane and to study at the Slade School of Art.

During World War II, Allen lived in London and as well as teaching art, spent one day a week sketching scenes in factories undertaking work for the war effort. Most of her war pieces, and her earlier work, was lost when her studio was destroyed in the Blitz. The War Artists' Advisory Committee purchased one of her surviving watercolours entitled Tacking Boots which is now in the Imperial War Museum. The work depicts a woman in a black dress behind a tacking machine, working on a black boot. In October 1959 her work was featured in the Some Women Artists Exhibition at the Imperial War Museum.

From 1938 until 1948 Allen served as a committee member and exhibition secretary of the Artists' International Association. After the war, Allen was appointed as a senior lecturer at Goldsmiths' College and worked there until 1966 when she retired from the post of principal lecturer and head of art and design to concentrate on painting full-time. In 1954, Allen was elected a member of the Worshipful Company of Painters and Stainers.

Allen's work is included in a number of public collections, including the Museum of London, University of Liverpool, Leamington Spa Art Gallery and Museum, Morley College, and Goldsmiths, University of London. The Imperial War Museum also holds a file in its archive on Allen, which includes biographical details, work submissions to the museum, and a copy of the leaflet for the Some Women Artists' exhibition.
