= Ernest Heber Thompson =

New Zealand painter and engraver (1891–1971)

- Born: 20 January 1891; Dunedin, New Zealand
- Died: 13 April 1971 (aged 80); Long Crendon, Buckinghamshire
- Known for: Painting

Ernest Heber Thompson (20 January 1891–13 April 1971) was a New Zealand painter, printmaker and teacher who was notable for having served as a war artist in both World War I and in World War II.

== Biography ==
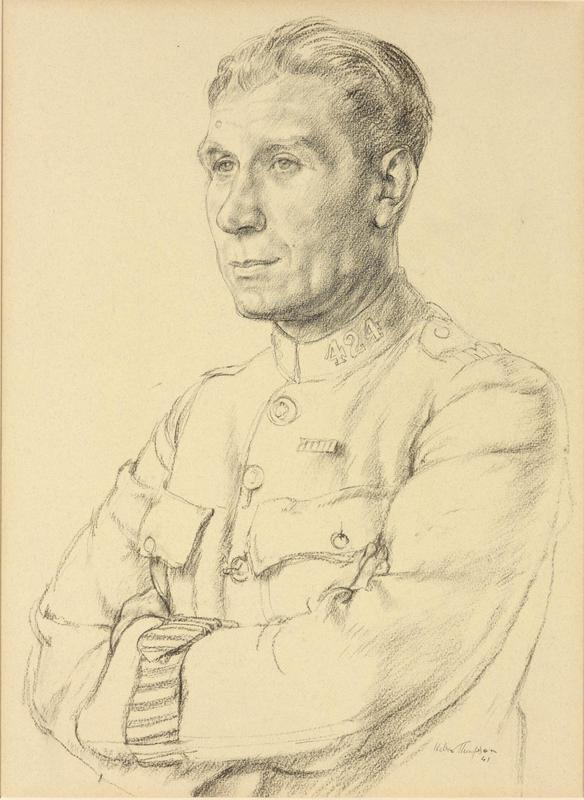
Thomas Tanner GM: War Reserve Police Constable, Maryleborne Lane Police Station (1941) (Art.IWM ART LD 1730)

Thompson was born in Dunedin in New Zealand and attended the Dunedin School of Art, where he was taught by Alfred Henry O'Keeffe. Thompson worked as a cartoonist for the local Otago Daily Times newspaper and as a commercial artist. He enlisted in the New Zealand Army, and during World War I served as a sergeant in the 3rd New Zealand Rifle Brigade in France. While in France, Thompson completed several cartoons which were published in the army magazine Chronicles of NZEF and in a Christmas publication New Zealand at the Front. On the 7 June 1917, Thompson was badly wounded at the Battle of Messines and was sent to England to recover. During his convalescence, Thompson made sketches of the medical staff treating him and these were published in a collection called Light Diet which was sold to support the work of New Zealand war artists.

After the War, an Army scholarship allowed Thompson to attend the Slade School of Art from 1919. He also studied etching under Frank Short at the Royal College of Art, where he won a prize for his work. Thompson also attended the Central School of Arts and Crafts and was an engraving finalist for the Prix de Rome prize in 1923. Thompson worked as a staff member at the Central School of Arts and Crafts from 1941 until 1966 and also taught part-time at other art schools including the Hornsey School of Art and also at Highgate, Willesden and at Harrow. Thompson was also employed by the National Art Gallery of New Zealand as its London representative and for many years recommended artworks for the Museum to acquire.

In the Second World War Thompson served as an Air Raid Warden during the Blitz. In October 1941, the War Artists' Advisory Committee commissioned Thompson to produce three portraits of police and civil defence workers for 10 guineas each. Thompson produced a fourth portrait which he gifted to the Committee.

For many years Thompson lived in Long Crendon in Buckinghamshire, where he died in 1971.
