= Leila Faithfull =

British artist (1896-1994)

- Born: Leila Elizabeth Josephine Reynolds; 12 April 1896; Woolton, England
- Died: 8 January 1994 (aged 97); Clifton, Bristol, England
- Known for: Painting; medical illustration
- Spouses: George Ferdinand Hay Faithfull (m. 1919; died 1942); Thomas Cuthbert Worsley (m. 1943; died 1977)

Leila Elizabeth Josephine Worsley (nee Reynolds 12 April 1896 – 8 January 1994) was a British artist, who throughout her career worked in a variety of media and who is best known for the artworks she produced during the Second World War, depicting events in Britain.

== Biography ==
Faithfull was born on 12 April 1896 at Woolton, a suburb of Liverpool where her father, Sir James Reynolds, had business interests. She married George Faithfull in 1919, and after his death she married, in 1943, the writer and critic Cuthbert Worsley.

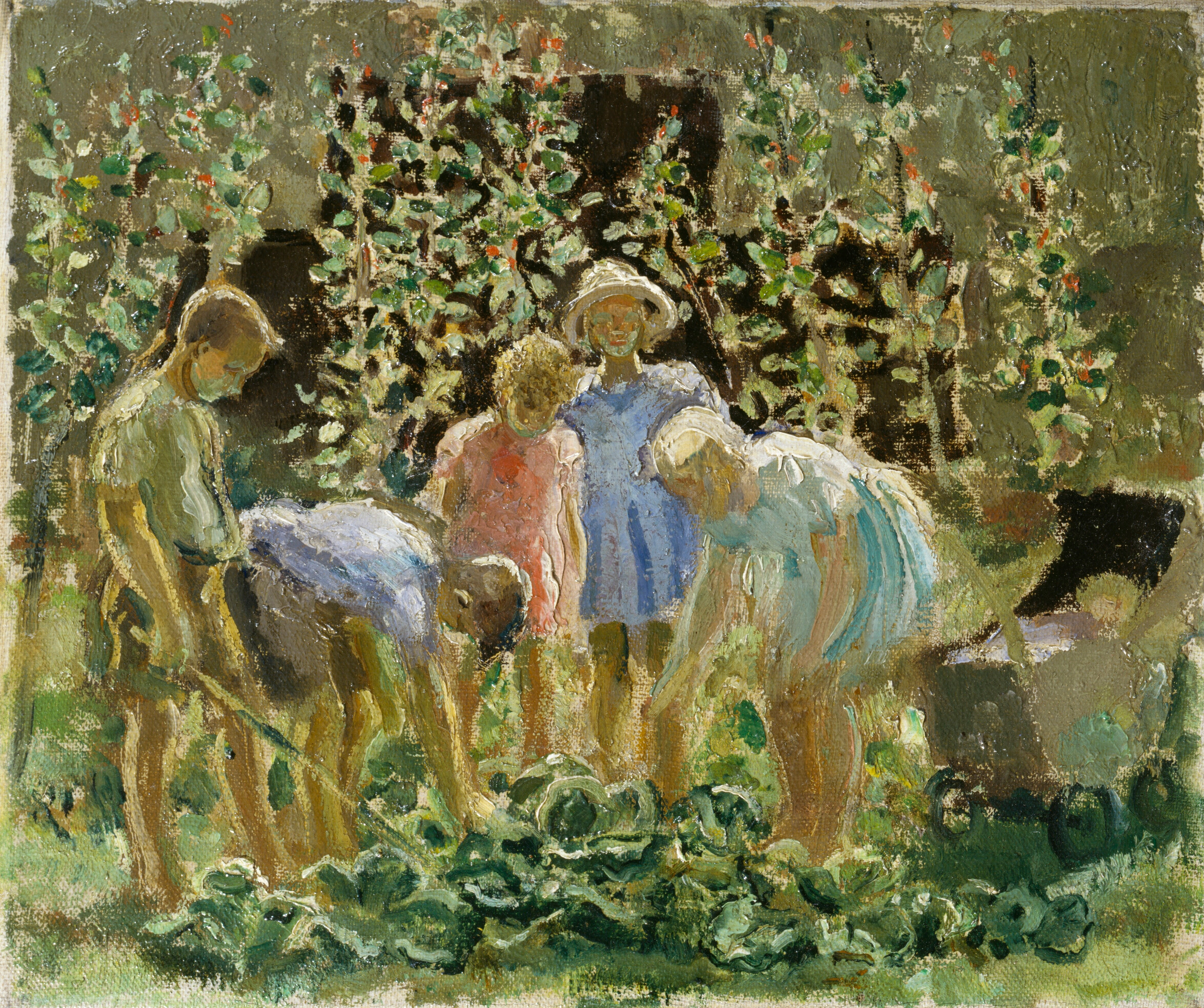
Evacuees Growing Cabbages (Art.IWM ART.LD 428) (1940)

Faithfull studied at the Slade School of Fine Art throughout 1923 and 1924, before going to Paris to study at the Académie de la Grande Chaumière. In 1933 she exhibited at the Salon des Artistes Francais in Paris. At the start of World War Two, Faithfull applied to work for the War Artists' Advisory Committee, WAAC. Although not given a full-time commission by WAAC, she was given facilities and permits to work. She used these to produce paintings depicting evacuee children and, later, scenes of American servicemen playing baseball in a London park, and these pieces were purchased by WAAC. During the war, Faithfull also worked for a time as a surgical artist at the new plastic surgery unit at the Queen Victoria Hospital in East Grinstead under Sir Archibald McIndoe. At the end of the war, Faithfull produced a triptych depicting the crowds gathered around Buckingham Palace, celebrating on VE-Day.

After the war, Faithfull built a reputation as a portrait painter and exhibited widely with works shown at the Royal Academy of Arts, the Royal Society of British Artists and the New English Art Club. Both Kenneth Clark and Sir Edward Marsh acquired examples of her work for their private collections. In her later years she begin working in metal, creating figures of dancers and horses. Faithfull died at St. Angela's Convent in Clifton, Bristol where she had lived for several years.
