= Mollie Forestier-Walker =

British artist (1912-1990)

- Born: 1912; Devon, England
- Died: 1990 (aged 77–78)
- Education: West of England College of Art
- Known for: Portrait painting

Mollie Forestier-Walker (1912–1990) was a British artist.

== Biography ==
Forestier-Walker grew up in Devon and, as well as taking private art lessons, attended the West of England College of Art in Bristol. In 1944, she painted a three-quarter length portrait of Wing Commander Guy Gibson in his RAF uniform. After Gibson was killed later that year the War Artists' Advisory Committee purchased the picture and it is now in the collection of the Imperial War Museum in London. In 1949 she exhibited a work at the Paris Salon for which she received an honourable mention. She also exhibited with The Pastel Society, the National Society of Painters, Sculptors and Gravers and with the Royal Society of Portrait Painters. Forestier-Walker lived in London and later at St Mawes in Cornwall.
