= Michael Ford (artist) =

English painter (1920-2005)

- Born: 28 July 1920; Overton, England
- Died: 16 June 2005 (aged 84); Winchester, England
- Education: Goldsmiths' College
- Known for: Painting, drawing

Michael Ford (28 July 1920 – 16 June 2005) was an English artist who worked in several media and whose paintings often have a somewhat naive quality coupled with elements of minute, detailed observation.

== Biography ==
=== Early life ===
Ford was the son of a former Army major who was a farmer and the managing director of a seed merchant business at Overton near Winchester. Ford was born deaf as a result of his mother contracting rubella while pregnant. His mother ran a 'Home School' on the family farm which Ford attended, before studying art at Goldsmiths' College between 1937 and 1940.

=== World War Two ===
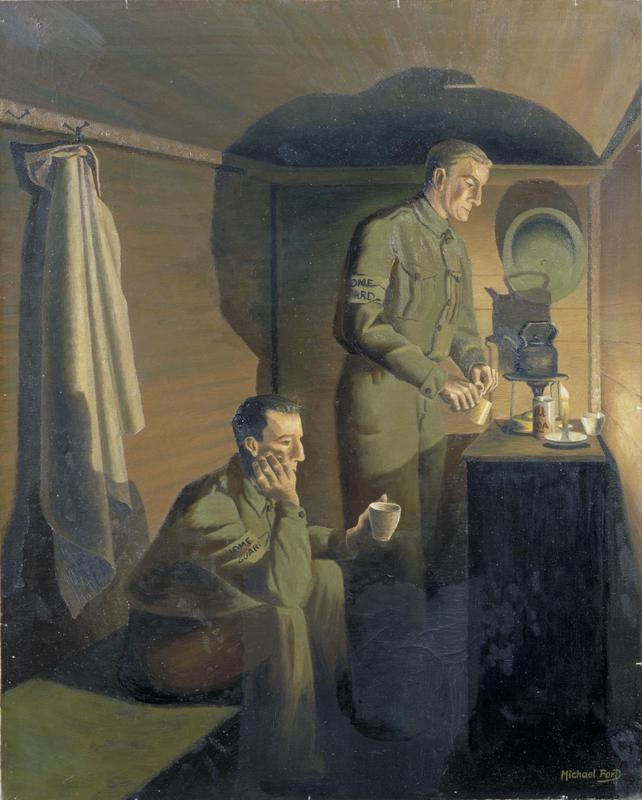
Home Guard Brewing Tea just before Dawn (1941) (Art.IWM ART LD 846)

In May 1940, Ford joined the Local Defence Volunteers, which soon became the Home Guard and also worked three days per week as a coal miner whilst also doing farm work. He learnt to ride a motorbike and became a dispatch rider. Ford continued to paint and submitted a number of pictures to the War Artists' Advisory Committee, WAAC. The first to be accepted by WAAC was Home Guards Brewing Tea just before Dawn which Ford had first sketched in a shepherd's hut whilst waiting to go on Home Guard duty. A submission in May 1941 of a painting of a Land Girl was refused, but in July 1941 WAAC accepted War Weapons Week in a Country Town and included it in their ongoing National Gallery exhibition. A reproduction of the painting was included in Eric Newton's 1945 book War Through Artists' Eyes. Ford continued with his Home Guard duties and farm work and in February 1942 submitted another picture to WAAC. This oil painting, Italian Prisoners-of-war Working on the Land, was purchased by WAAC for fifteen guineas and was one of the few depictions of prisoners of war at work acquired by WAAC. Ford also designed a poster featuring a Land Girl with the slogan "Are you working or shirking ? More women are needed".

=== Later life ===
After the war, Ford had a long career as an artist and illustrator. He worked in many different media, pastels, ink, charcoal, watercolours and oil paint. He had works exhibited at the Royal Academy, with the Royal Society of Portrait Painters, with the New English Art Club, the Royal Society of British Artists and in the Paris Salon. Ford had a long-running contract with the magazine Farmers Weekly to portray a featured farmer or landowner. Ford died at Winchester in 2005.
