= Vincent Evans (artist) =

Welsh artist (1896–1976)

- Born: 1896; Ystalyfera, Wales
- Died: 1976 (aged 79–80); Slough, Berkshire
- Education: Swansea School of Art; Royal College of Arts
- Known for: Painting and illustrations

Vincent Evans (1896–1976) was a Welsh artist who had a varied career as a painter, printmaker and art teacher and is known for his depictions of mine workers.

== Biography ==
Evans was born in Ystalyfera in the Swansea Valley in South Wales. Evans was born into a large family of seven children and from the age of thirteen worked as a coal miner. In 1911, he began taking part-time classes at the Swansea School of Art and in 1912 some of his drawings were printed in the Cambria Daily Leader.

After ten years working in local pits, Evans attended Swansea School of Art. By 1919 Evans had had a picture exhibited at the Royal Academy and his painting Toilers Underground had been bought by the Miners' Federation of Great Britain for £60. In 1920, he won a scholarship to the Royal College of Art, RCA, where he studied under William Rothenstein and Frank Short until 1922.

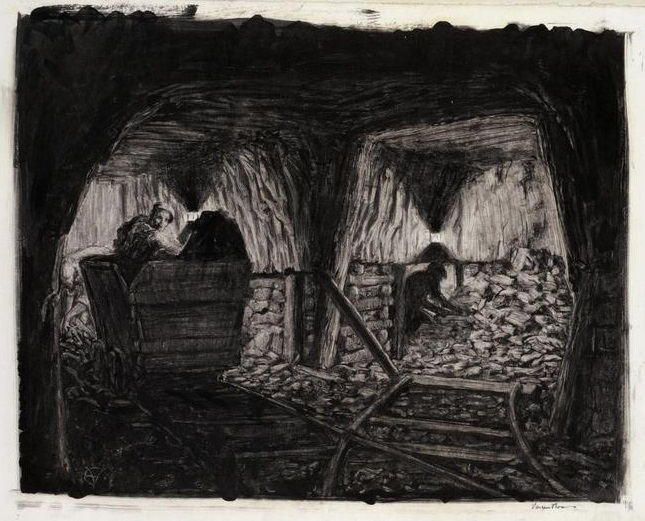
Turning a New Stall in a Coalmine (Art.IWM ART LD 2526)

After graduating from the RCA, Evans undertook a variety of commissions in Britain and overseas. Between 1924 and 1933, he worked as the Art Director at the Wanganui Technical College in New Zealand. This led to Evans representing that country in the art contest at the 1928 Olympics in Amsterdam. After he returned from New Zealand, Evans resumed painting scenes in the South Wales coalfields and throughout the 1930s produced a substantial body of work there. In 1936 he had two large pieces showing underground workers shown at the Royal Academy. In the mid-1930s he began work on his largest picture, A Welsh Family Idyll which he regarded as a statement of Welsh national values and a tribute to his home village.

During World War II, Evans had a number of works, depicting miners working underground, accepted by the War Artists' Advisory Committee. Before the War, in 1935, Evans had also completed a similar commission for the South Wales branch of the Miners Federation. From 1940, he taught at Slough Grammar School and eventually became the art master there. Evans held that post until 1968 and then, after further time abroad, taught at Slough College until 1968. Evans also worked as chief examiner for the London University Examination Board and the Central Welsh Examination Board.

Evans was a fine portrait painter, was a member of the Royal Society of Portrait Painters and exhibited nineteen times at the Royal Academy, first showing there while still a student at the RCA and mostly showing mining subjects. He also exhibited at the New English Art Club, the Leicester Galleries and at the Paris Salon.
