= Frank Barrington Craig =

British painter (1902-1951)

- Born: 2 March 1902; Hampstead, London, England
- Died: 4 February 1951 (aged 48); Chelsea, London, England
- Known for: Portrait painting

Frank Barrington Craig (2 March 1902 – 4 February 1951), also known as Barry Craig, was a British painter of portraits and landscapes and also an art teacher.

== Biography ==
Craig was born in Hampstead in north London into a family of artists. He was educated at Rugby School. His father was the artist Frank Craig and, in due course, his own son, Adam, would become a painter. Craig studied at the Slade School of Art between 1919 and 1924. His fellow students included Rodney Joseph Burn, Walter Thomas Monnington and Mary Potter. Craig moved to South Africa and worked as professor of painting at the Michaelis School of Fine Art in Cape Town from 1926 to 1933. Upon returning to Britain, Craig taught at Saint Martin's School of Art in London until 1950.

During the Second World War, Craig undertook camouflage work for the British Government. He also had one painting, on a camouflage subject, purchased by the War Artists Advisory Committee, WAAC, in June 1943 and he was subsequently commissioned to paint portraits of a fire-guarding team based in Weston-Super-Mare by WAAC. From 1946 when he was elected a member, Craig exhibited regularly with the New English Art Club. He exhibited at the Royal Academy and had exhibitions at the Goupil Gallery and the Cooling Galleries. Craig often painted landscapes in Provence and Brittany, and an example of the former is held in the UK Government Art Collection. Craig died in Chelsea and a retrospective exhibition of his work was held in 1987 at the New Art Centre.
