= Colin Moss (artist) =

English painter (1914–2005)

- Born: 30 April 1914; Ipswich
- Died: 16 December 2005 (aged 91)
- Education: Plymouth Art School, Royal College of Art
- Known for: Painting, drawing
- Website: www.colinmoss.info

Colin William Moss (30 April 1914 – 16 December 2005) was a British artist and teacher who served as a camouflage designer during World War Two.

== Biography ==
=== Early life ===
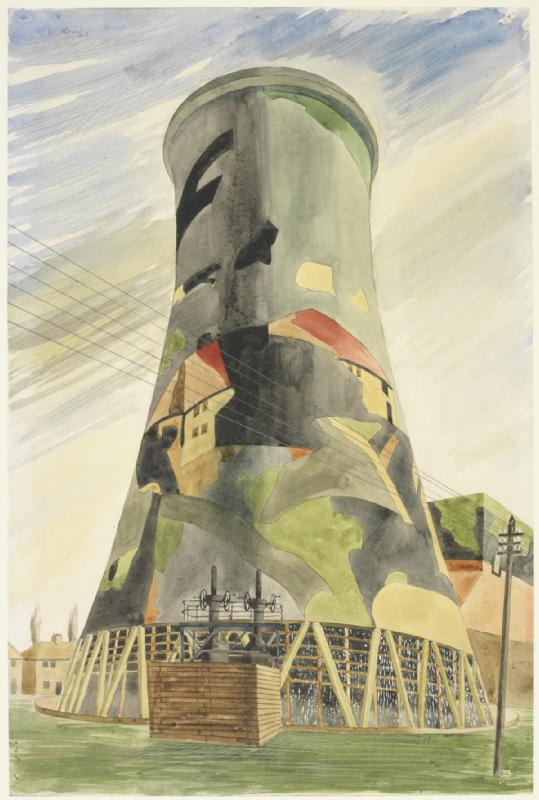
The Big Tower, Camouflaged (1943) (Art.IWM ART LD 3025)

Moss was born in Ipswich above the family shop and off-licence. His father was killed at Passchendaele in 1917 and Moss and his elder sister were brought up by relatives in Devonport near Plymouth. Moss studied at the Plymouth Art School from 1930 to 1934 before continuing his studies at the Royal College of Art under Gilbert Spencer and Charles Mahoney. For his 1937 diploma show he included the oil painting Hunger Marchers, based on the Jarrow March of the previous year – Moss was, and remained, a socialist who was proud of his working-class roots. He worked on murals for the British Pavilion at the 1939 New York World's Fair.

=== War-service ===
When World War Two broke out Moss, like many artists, applied to the Ministry of Home Security to do camouflage work. He became one of the eighty-three camouflage officers and technicians working at the Ministry's Civil Defence Camouflage Establishment at Leamington Spa. When his time at Leamington had come to an end, Moss was given a months leave to record his designs before he transferred to other duties. Moss made a series of watercolours recording the elaborate camouflage scheme he had designed and painted for the Stonebridge Power Station in Wembley. In 1941 he was drafted into the Life Guards and served in the Middle East as a captain before joining the Army Education Corps in Palestine after the war. A number of the pictures he painted at Stonebridge, and others he painted whilst on active service in the Middle East, were subsequently purchased by the War Artists' Advisory Committee and presented to the Imperial War Museum at the end of the conflict.

=== Post-war ===
When his military service ended, in 1947, Moss took a teaching post at the Ipswich School of Art and, apart from a short spell with Oskar Kokoschka in Salzburg in 1961, held various positions there until his retirement in 1979. One-man exhibitions at the Kensington Art Gallery, in 1951, and at the Zwemmer Gallery in 1955 led to several national collections acquiring examples of his work. He became a founder member of the New Ipswich Art Group in 1958, and the Six in Suffolk Group in 1976. Moss served as chairman of the Ipswich Art Club for three years and frequently exhibited at both the Royal Academy and the Royal Watercolour Society. During the 1980s retrospective exhibitions of his work were held at the Wolsey Art Gallery in Ipswich in 1981, at the Minories Gallery in Colchester in 1983 and at Bury St. Edmunds Art Gallery in 1987. From 1981 to 1995 Moss was an art critic to the East Anglian Daily Times. He continued to hold numerous solo exhibitions after his retirement and could count both Brian Eno and Maggi Hambling among his pupils.
