= Robert Austin (artist) =

English painter

Robert Sargent Austin
- Born: 23 June 1895; Leicester, England
- Died: 18 September 1973 (aged 78); Burnham Overy Staithe, Norfolk, England
- Education: Royal College of Art
- Known for: Painting, printmaking, engraving

Robert Sargent Austin RA PPRWS PPRE (23 June 1895 – 18 September 1973) was a noted artist, illustrator, engraver and currency designer and widely considered to be one of Britain's leading mid-twentieth century printmakers.

== Biography ==
Austin studied at Leicester Municipal School of Art from 1909 to 1913 then at the Royal College of Art in London where his studies were interrupted by the First World War. He returned to the college in 1919 when he studied etching under Sir Frank Short and was awarded a scholarship in engraving to study in Italy. During the last 10 years of the etching revival between 1920 and 1930 he produced etchings from copper plates worked in very fine detail in an almost Pre-Raphaelite style. During the Second World War Austin worked as a war artist recording the efforts of women in the Royal Air Force and in the nursing services for the War Artists' Advisory Committee. During that period he produced a portrait of Lord Nelson as one of a series commissioned by London Transport called 'Our Heritage' and which also included portraits of William Pitt, Francis Drake, Earl Haig and Winston Churchill.

He then returned to teaching at the Royal College of Art as Professor of Engraving from 1946. Austin acted as an advisor on the design of banknotes to the Bank of England between 1956 and 1961 and designed the ten shillings and one pound notes issued in the early 1960s.

Austin was elected a Fellow of the Royal Society of Painter-Etchers and Engravers (R.E.) in 1927 and succeeded Malcolm Osborne to become the Society's president from 1962 to 1970. He was elected a full member of the Royal Watercolour Society (R.W.S.) in 1934 and served as president from 1957 to 1973. He was elected an Associate of the Royal Academy in 1939 and to the full membership (R.A.) in 1949 as an engraver.

Austin was married to the writer Ada May Harrison for whom he illustrated a number of books. Ada's sister Rose was married to the sculptor and Royal Academician James Woodford. Robert and Ada had a son, also Robert, and two daughters, Rachel and Clare. In 1936 the artist purchased an old Methodist chapel in Burnham Overy Staithe in North Norfolk and converted it into a studio where he could look out onto the beautiful marshes and landscape and paint. He used to paint in the early hours of the morning because he liked the light best at that time.
