= Vivian Pitchforth =

English painter

- Born: 25 April 1895; Wakefield, West Riding of Yorkshire, England
- Died: 6 July 1982 (aged 87); Chelsea, London, England
- Education: Leeds School of Art; Royal College of Art
- Known for: Painting

Roland Vivian Pitchforth RA ARWS (25 April 1895 – 6 August 1982) was an English painter, teacher and an official British war artist during the Second World War. He excelled at watercolours and in later years concentrated on landscapes, seascapes and paintings of atmospheric effects.

== Early life ==
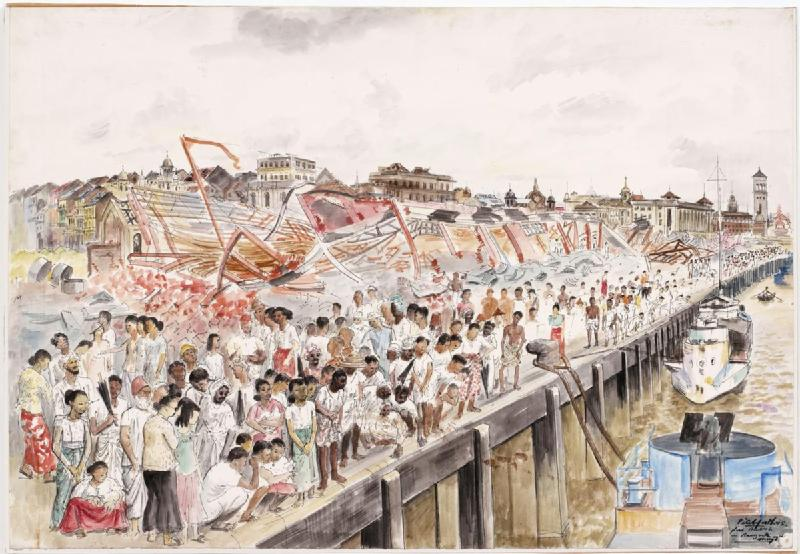
The First British Troops in Rangoon (Art.IWM ART LD 5181)

Pitchforth was born in Wakefield, West Riding of Yorkshire and studied at Leeds School of Art in 1914 and 1915 before joining the armed forces. He served in the Wakefield Battery of the Royal Garrison Artillery during World War One, service which left him with lifelong hearing damage. After the war, Pitchforth returned to his studies in Leeds where he won a scholarship that allowed him to study at the Royal College of Art from 1920 to 1925. After graduation he took a teaching job at Camberwell School of Art and, from 1926 to 1929, a similar post at Clapham School of Art. Pitchforth exhibited works at a number of London galleries and joined the London Group in 1929. He taught at St Martins School of Art from 1930 to 1937 and then at the Royal College of Art until the outbreak of the Second World War. In 1932, he married Edith Brenda Matthews at Chelsea Register Office.

== Second World War ==
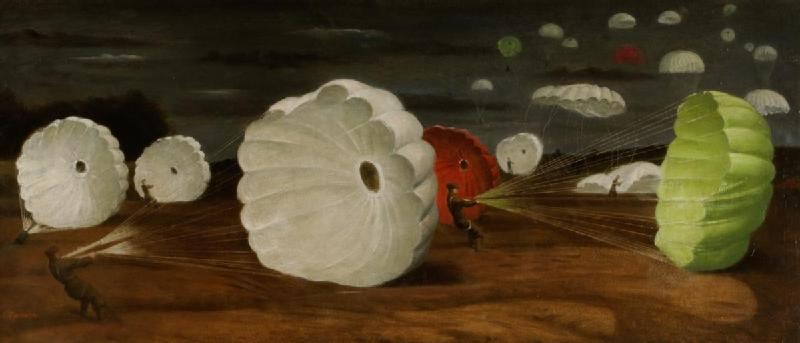
A Parachute-landing, 1940

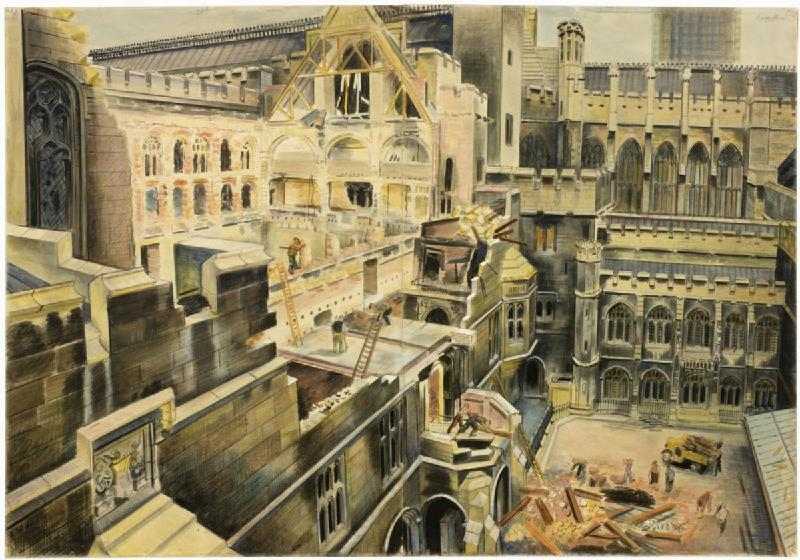
The Chamber, The House of Commons (Art.IWM ART LD 1581)

Pitchforth began the war painting scenes of bomb damage around London on short-term contracts for the War Artists' Advisory Committee (WAAC). These works quickly led to Pitchforth being given a salaried position with WAAC in 1940, in which he painted further scenes of bombed buildings, war-time factory production, air raid precaution training exercises, parachutes being packed and RAF operations rooms. In the spring of 1943, WAAC assigned Pitchforth to the Admiralty and although he still painted other subjects his focus shifted to naval vessels and maritime warfare. He travelled extensively to complete this commission, working in London, Birmingham, Bristol, Manchester, the south coast of England, Scotland, Northern Ireland, as well as sailing on convoys to Gibraltar and the Azores. In early 1944, he was painting on board ships in the Western Approaches. In 1945 he was assigned to the South East Asia Command and dispatched to the Far East to record the Allied campaigns in Burma and Ceylon. He was at Rangoon when the British took the city and helped camouflage the amphibious assault craft used by the British. At the end of the war Pitchforth developed a lung infection and spent some considerable time convalescing in South Africa before returning to Britain in 1948.

== Later life ==
After he returned to Britain Pitchforth resumed a teaching career, holding posts at Chelsea Polytechnic, Camberwell and St. Martins until he retired from the Sir John Cass College of Art in 1974. Throughout this period he continued to exhibit both in Britain and in several countries around the world.
