= List of English women artists =

This is a list of women artists who were born in England or whose works are closely associated with that country.

== A ==
- Evelyn Abelson (1886–1967), painter
- Ruth Abrahams (1931–2000), painter, illustrator
- Judith Ackland (1892–1971), landscape painter
- Elinor Proby Adams (1885–1945), painter
- Sarah Gough Adamson (1888–1963), painter
- Edith Helena Adie (1865–1947), painter
- Marion Adnams (1898–1995), painter, printmaker, and draughtswoman
- Mary Adshead (1904–1995), painter, illustrator, designer
- Eileen Agar (1899–1991), painter and photographer
- Sam Ainsley (born 1950), painter and tapestry artist
- Pauline Aitken (1893–1958), sculptor
- Eileen Aldridge (1916–1990), painter
- Griselda Allan (1905–1987), painter
- Rosemary Allan (1911–2008), painter
- Daphne Allen (1899–1985), painter
- Kathleen Allen (1906–1983), painter
- Helen Allingham (1848–1926), watercolourist, illustrator
- Anna Alma-Tadema (1867–1943), painter
- Laura Theresa Alma-Tadema (1852–1909), painter
- Athene Andrade (1908–1973), painter
- Edith Alice Andrews (1873–1958), painter, illustrator
- Lilian Andrews (1878–c.1962), painter
- Marie Angel (1923–2010), painter, illustrator
- Beatrice Angle (1859–1915), sculptor
- Mabel Annesley (1881–1959), engraver, painter
- Amanda Ansell (born 1976), painter
- Norah Ansell (1906–1990), sculptor
- Mary Anne Ansley (fl. 1810–1840), painter
- Anne Margaret Coke, Viscountess Anson (1779–1843), painter
- Rachel Ara (born 1965), conceptual and data artist
- Phyllis Archibald (1880–1947), sculptor
- Janet Archer (fl. 1873–1916), painter
- Val Archer (born 1946), painter
- Edith Arendrup (1846–1934), painter and religious sister
- Ann Arnold (1936–2015), painter
- Sue Arrowsmith (1950–2014), contemporary artist
- Pamela Ascherson (1923–2010), sculptor, illustrator
- Felicity Askew (born 1899, date of death unknown), sculptor
- Sophie Atkinson (1876–1972), painter, illustrator
- Mary Audsley (1919–2008), painter, sculptor
- Winifred Austen (1876–1964), painter
- Gillian Ayres (1930–2018), painter, printmaker

== B ==
- Roma Babuniak (born 1952), ceramicist
- Margaret Backhouse (1818–1888), portrait painter
- Marjorie May Bacon (1902–1988), painter, printmaker
- Blanche Baker (1844–1929), painter
- Gladys Baker (1889–1974), painter
- Barbara Banister (1895–1984), painter, silversmith
- Lesley Banks (born 1962), painter
- Fiona Banner (born 1966), contemporary artist
- Audrey Barker (1932–2002), installation artist
- Lucette Barker (1816–1905), painter
- Gwen Barnard (1912–1988), painter, printmaker
- Mary Baylis Barnard (1870–1946), painter
- Angela Barrett (born 1955), illustrator and painter
- Anna Barriball (born 1972), mixed media artist
- Lindsay Bartholomew (born 1944), watercolour painter
- Edith Bateson (1867–1938), painter, sculptor
- Pauline Baumann (1899–1977), painter, printmaker
- Margaret Beale (1886–1969), marine artist
- Mary Beale (1633–1699), portrait painter
- Sophia Beale (1837–1920), painter
- Nicola Bealing (born 1963), painter
- Celia Frances Bedford (1904–1959), painter, printmaker
- Daisy Radcliffe Beresford (1879–1939), painter
- Sarah Beddington (born 1964), artist, filmmaker
- Gladys Kathleen Bell (1882–1965), miniatures painter
- Jeanne Bell (1888–1978), sculptor
- Vanessa Bell (1879–1961), painter, interior designer
- Eleanor Best (1875–1957), painter
- Joyce Bidder (1906–1999), sculptor
- Clara Billing (1881–1963), sculptor, painter
- Helen Binyon (1904–1979), illustrator
- Suzzan Blac (born 1960), surreal painter
- Mary Black (c.1737–1814), portrait painter
- Amelia Blackburn (active 1830s), papercutter, collage artist
- Vivien Blackett (born 1955), painter
- Audrey Blackman (1907–1990), sculptor, potter
- Eileen Blake (1878–1957), painter
- Zelma Blakely (1921–1978), illustrator
- Flavia Blois (1914–1980), landscape painter
- Margaret Blundell (1907–1996), painter, illustrator
- Anna Blunden (1829–1915), painter
- Barbara Bodichon (1827–1891), artist
- Deirdre Borlase (1925–2018), painter
- Daisy Theresa Borne (1906–1998), sculptor
- Doris Boulton-Maude (1892–1961), painter and printmaker
- Georgina Bowers (1836–1912), illustrator
- Eden Box (1919–1988), painter
- Dorothea Braby (1909–1987), illustrator
- Dorothy Bradford (artist) (1918–2008), painter
- Dorothy Elizabeth Bradford (1897–1986), painter
- Constance Bradshaw (1872–1961), landscapist
- Phyllis Bray (1911–1991), artist and muralist
- Rosa Brett (1829–1882), Pre-Raphaelite painter
- Simone Brewster (born c. 1982), multidisciplinary
- Denise Broadley (1913–2007), painter
- Iris Brooke (1905–c.1967), illustrator and author
- Irene Mary Browne, (1881–1977), sculptor and potter
- Marjorie Frances Bruford (1902–1958), painter
- Olivia Mary Bryden (1883–1951), painter
- Evelyne Oughtred Buchanan (1883–1979), painter
- Jo Budd (born 1961), textile artist
- Eliza Mary Burgess (1878–1961), painter
- Averil Burleigh (1883–1949), painter
- Louie Burrell (1873–1971), painter
- Dorothy Burroughes (1883–1963), illustrator
- Lady Elizabeth Butler (Elizabeth Thompson) (1846–1933), painter
- Mildred Anne Butler (1858–1941), painter
- Caroline Byng Lucas (1886–1967), painter and printer
- Anne Frances Byrne (1775–1837), flower painter
- Fanny Byse (1849–?), sculptor

== C ==
- Florence Callcott (1866–1936), sculptor
- Helen Cammock (born 1970), photographer, poet
- Estella Campavias (1918–1990), ceramicist, sculptor
- Felicity Campbell (1909–?), painter and illustrator
- Louisa Starr Canziani (1845–1909), painter
- Nancy Carline (1909–2004), landscape painter
- Margaret Sarah Carpenter (1793–1872), portrait painter
- Edith Carr (1875–1949), painter
- Joanna Carrington (1931–2003), painter
- Jessie Case Vesel (1855–1937), painter
- Florence Castle (1867–1959), painter, illustrator
- Tamsyn Challenger, contemporary artist
- Eileen Chandler (1904–1993), portrait painter
- Alice Chaplin (1848–1921), sculptor
- Daphne Charlton (1909–1991), painter
- Felicity Charlton (1913–2009), painter
- Evelyn Cheston (1875–1929), landscape painter
- Milly Childers (1866–1922), painter
- Helen Clapcott (born 1952), painter
- Jean Clark (1902–1999), watercolour painter and muralist
- Bethia Clarke (1867–1959), painter
- Dora Clarke (1895–1989), sculptor
- Katharine Clausen (1886-1936), painter
- Freda Coleborn (1911–1965), glass artist
- Shelagh Cluett (1947–2007), sculptor
- Helen Mary Coaton (1911–2005), sculptor
- Hilary Dulcie Cobbett (1885–1976), painter
- Isabel Codrington (1874–1943), painter
- Ellen Gertrude Cohen (1846–?), illustrator
- Dorothy Coke (1897–1979), painter
- Elsie Vera Cole (1885–1967), painter
- Ruth Collet (1909–2001), painter
- Susan Collier (1938–2011), textile designer
- Elisabeth Collins (1904–2000), painter and sculptor
- Ithell Colquhoun (1906–1988), painter, occultist and author
- Joanna Constantinidis (1927–2000), potter, ceramist
- Alice May Cook (1876–1960), painter, illustrator
- Beryl Cook (1926–2008), painter
- May Louise Greville Cooksey (1878–1943), painter
- Jessica Cooper (born 1967), painter and designer
- Constance Copeman (1864–1953), painter
- Teresa Copnall (1882–1972), painter
- Edith Corbet (1846–1920), painter
- Emma Cousin (born 1986), painter
- Dorothy Cox (1882–1947), painter
- Doris Crane (1911–1999), sculptor
- Frances Crawshaw (1876–1968), painter
- Emily Grace Creswell (1889–1931), painter
- Fiona Crisp (born 1966), photographer, installation artist
- Barbara Crocker (1910–1995), painter, author
- Stella Rebecca Crofts (1898–1964), sculptor and potter
- Joan Crossley-Holland (1912–2005), gallery owner, potter
- Lizzie Mary Cullen, designer
- Nora Cundell (1889–1948), painter
- Esmé Currey (1881–1973), painter, etcher
- Mary Henrietta Dering Curtois (1854–1929), painter

== D ==
- Edith Mary Davey (1867–1953), painter
- Mary Davis (1866–1941), painter
- Gladys Dawson (1909–1993), painter, illustrator
- Frances Sally Day (1816–1892), painter, photographer
- Evelyn De Morgan (1855–1919), painter
- Jane Mary Dealy (1856–1939), painter
- Alison Debenham (1903–1967), painter
- Elise D'Elboux (1870–1956), painter, illustrator
- Etheline E. Dell (1865–1891), painter, illustrator
- Christabel Dennison (1884–1924), painter, sculptor
- Joyce Dennys (1893–1991), cartoonist, illustrator and painter.
- Brigid Derham (1943–1980), painter
- Evangeline Dickson (1922–2004), painter
- Grace Digby (1895–1964), painter
- Eve Disher (1894–1991), painter
- Mary Dobson (born 1912, date of death unknown), painter, illustrator
- Mary Donington (1909–1987), sculptor
- Barbara Dorf (1933–2016), painter
- Jane Dowling (1925–2023), painter
- Edith Downing (1857–1931), sculptor
- Marjorie Drawbell (1903–2000), sculptor, potter
- Violet Dreschfeld (1890–1975), sculptor
- Pamela Drew (1910–1989), painter of marine and aviation subjects
- Yvonne Drewry (1918–2007), painter and printmaker
- Lilian Dring (1908–1998), textile artist
- Rose Emma Drummond (d. 1840), portrait miniaturist
- Mary Elizabeth Duffield-Rosenberg (1819–1914), painter
- Evelyn Dunbar (1906–1960), painter, illustrator
- Susan Durant (1827–1873), sculptor

== E ==
- Aileen Eagleton (1902–1984), painter
- Ursula Edgcumbe (1900–1985), sculptor and painter
- Edith Edmonds (1874–1951), painter
- May de Montravel Edwardes (1887–1967), painter
- Helen Edwards (1882–1963), landscape painter
- Mildred Eldridge (1909–1991), painter
- Aileen Mary Elliott (1896–1966), marine artist
- Eleanor Joan Ellis (1904–1989), painter, woodcut artist
- Rosemary Ellis (1910–1998), painter, illustrator
- Tracey Emin (born 1963), multidisciplinary artist
- Rosalie Emslie (1891–1977), painter
- Nora England (1887–1970), painter
- Cicely Englefield (1893–1970), illustrator and author
- Grace English (1891–1956), painter
- Ethel Fanny Everett (1877-1951), painter and illustrator

== F ==
- Frances C. Fairman (1839–1923), painter
- Leila Faithfull (1896–1994), painter
- Julia Farrer (born 1950), abstract painter
- Daphne Fedarb (1912–1992), painter
- Mary Fedden (1915–2012), painter
- Magdalen Feline (died 1796), silversmith
- Hilda Fearon (1878–1917), painter
- Dee Ferris (born 1973), painter
- Celia Fiennes (1902–1998), printmaker, painter
- Myrta Fisher (1917–1999), painter
- Margaret Fitton (1902–1988), artist
- Victorine Foot (1920–2000), artist
- Elizabeth Forbes (1859–1912), painting
- Mollie Forestier-Walker (1912–1990), portrait painter
- Agnes Freda Forres (c. 1880–1942), sculptor
- Eleanor Fortescue-Brickdale (1872–1945), artist, illustrator
- Marcia Lane Foster (1897–1983), painter and book illustrator
- Mary Fox (1922–2005), painter
- Cherryl Fountain (born 1950), painter
- Elizabeth Bertha Fraser (1914–2006), sculptor
- Violet Fuller (1920–2006), painter

== G ==
- Alexandra Gallagher (born 1980), multidisciplinary artist
- Margaret Garland (1893–1976), painter
- Rachel Garfield<https://heni.com/news?artist=Rachel%20Garfield> (born 1963)
- Rose Garrard (born 1946), multidisciplinary artist, writer
- Alethea Garstin (1894–1978), painter
- Margaret Geddes (1914–1998), painter
- Kaff Gerrard (1894–1970), painter, potter
- Jean Gibson (1927–1991), sculptor
- Margaret Giles (1868–1949), sculptor
- Phyllis Ginger (1907–2005), painter, illustrator
- Edith Gittins (1845–1910), painter
- Elsie Gledstanes (1891–1982), painter
- Anne Gliddon (1807–1878), painter, illustrator
- Sybil Mullen Glover (1908–1995), landscape painter
- Maude Goodman (Matilda Scanes) (1853–1938), painter
- Hilda May Gordon (1874–1972), painter
- Sylvia Gosse (1881–1968), painter and printmaker
- Caroline Gotch (1854–1945), painter
- Mary Gow (1851–1929), painter
- Alice Kirkby Goyder (1875–1964), painter, etcher
- Mary Grant (1831–1908), sculptor
- Kate Greenaway (1846–1901), illustrator
- Barbara Greg (1900–1983), wood engraver
- Christine Gregory (1879–1963), sculptor
- Eleanor Gribble (1883–1960), painter, designer
- Mary Elizabeth Groom (1903–1958), illustrator, printmaker
- Kate Groobey (born 1979), painter
- Lucy Gunning (born 1964), filmmaker, installation artist, sculptor, video artist
- Kathleen Guthrie (1905–1981), painter, illustrator
- Edna Guy (artist) (1897–1969), painter
- Sophie Green (born 1992)

== H ==
- Maria C. Hakewill (died 1842), portrait painter
- Roxana Halls (born 1974), painter
- Emmeline Halse (1853–1930), sculptor
- Maggi Hambling (born 1945), painter, sculptor
- Gertrude Harvey (1879–1966), painter
- Lucy Harwood (1893–1972), painter
- Alice la Haubergere (fl. 1271–1310), blacksmith
- Mary Headlam (1873–1959), watercolour painter, printmaker and illustrator
- Isobel Heath (1908–1989), painter
- Elsie Henderson (1880–1967), painter, sculptor
- Sarah Hengler (c.1765–1845), firework artist
- Rose Henriques (1889–1972), painter
- Barbara Hepworth (1903–1975), painter, sculptor
- Gertrude Hermes (1901–1983), engraver
- Elsie Dalton Hewland (1901–1979), painter
- Cicely Hey (1896–1980), painter, sculptor
- Eileen Hickman-Smith (1909–1970), sculptor
- Wuon-Gean Ho (born 1973), printmaker
- Mary Hoare (1744–1820), painter
- Janet Hodgson (1960–2016), sculptor, public artist, filmmaker
- Sarah Holaday (died 1754), silversmith
- Edith Holden (1871–1920), painter, writer
- Ruth Hollingsworth (1880–1945), painter
- Gwynneth Holt (1909–1995), ivory sculptor
- Claire Hooper (born 1979), painter, video artist
- Nancy Horrocks (1900–1989), abstract painter
- Kathleen Horsman (1911–1998), potter
- Evelyn Houghton (1908–1983), painter
- Erlund Hudson (1912–2011), watercolour painter and etcher
- Georgina Hunt (1912–2012), abstract artist

== I ==
- Diane Ibbotson (born 1946), painter
- Marjorie Incledon (1891–1973), painter, stained glass artist
- Judy Inglis (1952–2003), painter
- Alice Instone (born 1975), painter

== J ==
- Muriel Amy Jackson (1902–1989), illustrator
- Kathleen Jebb (1879–1957), painter, engraver
- Blanche Jenkins (active 1872–1915), painter
- Alix Jennings (1884–1980), oil painter
- Chantal Joffe (born 1969), painter
- Vivien John (1915–1994), painter
- Esther Borough Johnson (1866–1958), painter
- Gwyneth Johnstone (1915–2010), painter
- Jean Jones (1927–2012), painter
- Lucy Jones (born 1955), painter
- Louise Jopling (1843–1933), painter
- Lily Delissa Joseph (1863–1940), painter

== K ==
- Marion Kalmus (born 1962), mixed media artist
- Helen Kapp (1901–1978), painter, curator
- Angelica Kauffman (1741–1807), painter
- Edith Kemp-Welch (1870–1941), painter
- Lucy Kemp-Welch (1869–1958), equine artist
- Alice Kettle (born 1961), textile artist
- Sarah Louisa Kilpack (1839–1909), painter
- Dorothy King (1907–1990), painter
- Margaret King (active 1779–87), painter
- Eve Kirk (1900–1969), painter
- Myfanwy Kitchin (1917–2002), painter, ceramicist
- Laura Knight (1877–1970), painter, printmaker
- Madge Knight (1895–1974), abstract painter
- Winifred Knights (1899–1947), painter

== L ==
- Jessica Landseer (1810–1880), landscape painter, miniaturist
- Edith Lawrence (1890–1973), printmaker
- Eva Leigh (1895–1981) portraitist (drawing and silhouettes)
- Sheila Lea (1901–1992), sculptor
- Molly Le Bas (1903–1996), sculptor
- Erica Lee (1888–1981), sculptor
- Eliza Anne Leslie-Melville (1829–1919), painter
- Alice Lindley-Millican (1885–1930), sculptor
- Harriet Lisle (1717–1794), painter
- Beatrice Ethel Lithiby (1889–1966), painter
- Elizabeth Jane Lloyd (1928–1995), painter and teacher
- Dorothy Lockwood (1910–1991), painter
- Marie Seymour Lucas (1855–1921), painter
- Sarah Lucas (born 1962), contemporary artist

== M ==
- Frances Macdonald (1914–2002), painter
- Jessie Macgregor (1847–1919), painter
- Nicolette Macnamara (1911–1987), painter, writer
- Edna Mann (1926–1985), painter
- Violet Manners (1856–1937), painter
- Kathryn Maple, (born 1989), painter
- Madeline Marrable (1833–1916), painter
- Maria Marshall (born 1966), visual artist
- Freda Marston (1895–1949), painter
- Edith Martineau (1842–1909), painter
- Mei Matsuoka (born 1981), children's illustrator and author
- Charlotte Mayer (1929–2022), sculptor
- Anna Mazzotta (born 1970), painter
- Daphne McClure (born 1930), painter
- Mary McCrossan (1865–1934), painter
- Mary McEvoy, (1870–1941), painter
- Dorothy Mead (1928–1975), painter
- Annie Russell Merrylees (1866–1959), miniaturist
- Hilary Miller (1919–1993), painter, illustrator
- Maggie Mitchell (1883–1953), sculptor
- Victoria Monkhouse (1883–1970), painter
- Clara Montalba (1840–1929), painter
- Ellen Montalba (1842–1912), painter
- Henrietta Montalba (1848–1893), sculptor
- Hilda Montalba (1846–1919), painter, sculptor
- Esther Moore (1857–1934), sculptor, designer
- Mona Moore (1917–2000), painter, illustrator
- Mary Moser (1744–1819), painter
- Marlow Moss (1889–1958), painter, sculptor
- Olive Mudie-Cooke (1890–1925), painter
- Annie Feray Mutrie (1826–1893), painter
- Martha Darley Mutrie (1824–1885), painter
- Morag Myerscough (born 1963), multidisciplinary

== N ==
- Isabel Naftel (1832–1912), landscape and genre painter
- Irene Newton (1915–1992), textile designer
- Catherine Maude Nichols (1847–1923), painter
- Margaret Graeme Niven (1906–1997), painter
- Marianne North (1830–1890), flower painter
- Krysia Nowak (born 1948), painter, mixed-media artist

== O ==
- Emma Oliver (1819–1885), landscape painter
- Madge Oliver (1875–1924), painter
- Catherine Ouless (1879–1961) painter
- Emily Mary Osborn (1828–1925), painter

== P ==
- Grace Pailthorpe (1883–1971), painter
- Kathleen Parbury (1901–1986), sculptor
- Constance-Anne Parker (1921–2016), sculptor
- Lilian Parker (1874–1947), sculptor, painter
- Janette Parris (born 1963)
- Florence Pash (1860–1951), painter
- Enid Peate (1883–1954), painter
- Jane Wallas Penfold (1820–1884), illustrator and naturalist
- Margot Perryman (born 1938)
- Kate Perugini (1839–1929), painter
- Rosemary Peto (1916–1998), painter
- Louise Pickard (1865–1928), painter
- Sarah Pickstone, painter
- Dulcie Mary Pillers (1891–1961), medical illustrator
- Pinwill sisters (born 1870s), woodcarvers
- Orovida Camille Pissarro (1893–1968), painter, etcher
- Primrose Pitman (1902–1998), painter
- Maria Pixell (died 1811) painter
- Elizabeth Polunin (1887–1950), artist, theatre designer
- Fay Pomerance (1912–2001), painter
- Melinda Camber Porter (1953–2008), painter, writer
- Beatrix Potter (1866–1943), painter, writer
- Emily Powell (born 1990), painter
- Jasmine Pradissitto (born 1966), painter, sculptor
- Margaret Fisher Prout (1875–1963), painter
- Brenda Pye (1907–2005), painter

== R ==
- Henrietta Rae (1859–1928), painter
- Bianca Raffaella (born 1992), painter
- Mary Ramsden (born 1984), painter
- Alma Ramsey (1907–1993), sculptor
- Lilian Rathmell (1909–2000), painter, fabric artist
- Gwen Raverat (1885–1957), engraver
- Ruth Raymond (1897–1986), calligrapher, weaver
- Louise Rayner (1832–1924), watercolourist
- Rachel Reckitt (1908–1995), sculptor, engraver
- Daphne Reynolds (1918–2002), printmaker, painter
- Flora Macdonald Reid (1861–1938), painter
- Mary Remington (1910–2003), painter
- Lady Mary Rennell (1901–1981), painter
- Harriet Riddell (born 1990), textile artist
- Anna Ridler (born 1985), artificial intelligence artist
- Bridget Riley (born 1931), painter
- Ruth Rix (born 1942), painter, multidisciplinary artist
- Phyllis Roberts (1916–?), painter, sculptor
- Ellen Mary Rope (1855–1934), sculptor
- Ellis Rowan (1848–1922), illustrator
- Anne Rushout (c.1767–1849), watercolorist
- Rosemary Rutherford (1912–1972), painter, stained glass artist
- Margaret Ryder (1908–1998), painter
- Adolfine Mary Ryland (1903–1983), sculptor

== S ==
- Anne Said (1914–1995), artist
- Emily Sarah, painter
- Stella Schmolle (1908–1975), painter
- Pamela Scott Wilkie (born 1937), painter, printmaker
- Dorothea Sharp (1874–1955), painter
- Alice Sheene, silversmith
- Clare Shenstone (born 1948), portrait painter
- Tai Shani (born 1976), performance artist
- Elizabeth Siddal (1829–1862), artist
- Emma Sillett (1802–1880), flower painter
- Corinne Silva (born 1976), contemporary artist
- Hilary Simon, silk painter
- Ruth Simpson (1889–1964), portrait painter
- Vikki Slowe (born 1947), printmaker and painter
- Mary Smirke (1779–1853), painter
- May Aimée Smith (1886–1962), painter
- Pamela Colman Smith (1878–1951), illustrator and painter
- Jean Spencer (1942–1998), abstract artist
- Maria Spilsbury (1776–1820), religious painter
- A. B. S. Sprigge (1906–1980), sculptor
- Zita Stead (1904–1986), medical illustrator
- Florence Steele (1857–1948), sculptor, designer
- Elsie Stevens (1907–?), painter
- Carole Steyn (born 1938), abstract painter
- Marie Spartali Stillman (1844–1927), painter
- Marianne Stokes (1855–1927), painter
- Sarah Stone (1760–1844), natural history artist
- Helen Stratton (1867–1961), book illustrator
- Linda Sutton (born 1947), painter
- Annie Swynnerton (1844–1933), painter

== T ==
- Emma Talbot (born 1969), painter
- Agnes Clara Tatham (1893–1972), painter
- Barbara Austin Taylor (1891–1951), sculptor
- Shirley Teed (1933–2018), painter
- Hilda Theobald (1901–1985), sculptor
- Valerie Thornton (1931–1991), etcher, printmaker
- Helen Thornycroft (1848–1937), painter
- Faye Toogood (born 1977), multidisciplinary
- Flora Twort (1893–1985), painter, pastellist
- Mary Fraser Tytler (1849–1938), painter, ceramicist

== V ==
- Gladys Vasey (1889–1981), portrait painter
- Elisabeth Vellacott (1905–2002), painter
- Dorothy Venning (1885–1942), sculptor
- Angela Verren (born 1930), painter
- Charlotte Verity, (born 1954), painter
- Stella Vine (born 1969), painter

== W ==
- Lillian Wade (1870–1923), sculptor
- Josephine Wall (born 1947), painter, sculptor
- Mary Lemon Waller (1851–1931), painter
- Audrey Walker (1928–2020), textile artist
- Hilda Annetta Walker (1877–1960), sculptor and painter
- Winifred Walker (1882–1965), botanical artist
- Kathleen Walne (1915–2011), watercolour painter
- Joan Warburton (1920–1996), painter
- Henrietta Ward (1832–1924), genre painter
- Billie Waters (1896–1979), painter
- Mary Spencer Watson (1913–2006), sculptor
- Maud Marian Wear (1873–1955), painter
- Cecilia Webb (1888–1957), sculptor
- Kate Westrup (1885–1928), animal painter, potter
- Edith Grace Wheatley (1888–1970), painter
- Erica White (1904–1991), sculptor
- Rachel Whiteread (born 1963), sculptor
- Mandy Wilkinson (born 1970), painter
- Caroline Fanny Williams (1836–1921), landscape painter
- Faith Winter (1927–2017), sculptor
- Ursula Wood (1868–1925), painter
- Gertrude Mary Woodward (1854–1939), scientific illustrator
- Meg Woolf (1923–2023), painter, sculptor
- Rose Wylie (born 1934), painter

== Y ==
- Nan Youngman (1906–1995), painter

== Z ==
- Georgiana Zornlin (1800–1881), painter
- Astrid Zydower (1930–2005), sculptor
