= Angle (disambiguation) =

An angle is a figure formed by two rays or a measure of rotation.

Angle may also refer to:

== Places ==
=== United States ===
- The Angle, in the American Civil War, an area of the Gettysburg battlefield
- Angle Township, Lake of the Woods County, Minnesota
  - Northwest Angle, known as "The Angle", the only place in the US outside Alaska that is north of the 49th parallel

=== United Kingdom ===
==== Wales ====
- Angle, Pembrokeshire, a village, parish and community
- Angle Peninsula Coast, Pembrokeshire

== Music ==
- Angle (album), a 1969 album by pianist Howard Riley
- An Angle, an American rock band

== Science and technology ==
- Angle (rib), an anatomical characteristic
- ANGLE (software), a graphics engine abstraction layer

== People ==
- Beatrice Angle (1859-1915), British artist
- Carol Remmer Angle, American pediatrician, nephrologist and toxicologist
- Edward Angle (1855–1930), American dentist, widely regarded as the father of modern orthodontics
- Eric Angle (born 1967), brother of Kurt Angle, professional wrestler
- Jared Angle, New York City Ballet principal dancer
- Jim Angle (1946-2022), American journalist
- Kurt Angle (born 1968), Olympic gold medalist in amateur wrestling, and professional wrestler
- Sharron Angle (born 1949), Nevada politician
- Tyler Angle (born 2000), Canadian ice hockey player

== Other uses ==
- Angle (astrology), a cardinal point of an astrological chart
- Angles (tribe), a Germanic tribe that settled in Britain
- Angling, a fishing technique
- Angle (journalism)
- Angle, in professional wrestling terminology, a character's motivating story
- Structural angle

== See also ==
- Angle of attack
- Angle of incidence (disambiguation)
- Angle of parallelism
- Angle of repose
- Angle of view
- Angle Man
- Angles (disambiguation)
- Angel (disambiguation)
- Bloody Angle (disambiguation)
- Team Angle (disambiguation)
- The Ingraham Angle, an American talk show on Fox News Channel hosted by Laura Ingraham
