= Vafaei =

Vafaei or Vafaie (Persian: وفایی) is a Persian surname. Notable people with the surname include:

- Alireza Vafaei (born 1989), Iranian futsal player
- Hossein Vafaei (born 1994), Iranian snooker player
- Homa Vafaie Farley
