= Angles =

Angles most commonly refers to:

- Angles (tribe), a Germanic-speaking people that took their name from the Angeln cultural region in Germany
- Angle, a geometric figure formed by two rays meeting at a common point

Angles may also refer to:

== Places ==
- Les Angles (disambiguation), France
  - Angles, Alpes-de-Haute-Provence, France
  - Angles, Vendée, France
  - Anglès, Tarn, France
- Anglès, Girona, Spain

== Music ==
- Angles (Dan Le Sac Vs Scroobius Pip album), 2008
- Angles (The Strokes album), 2011
- "Angles" (song), 2021 song by Wale featuring Chris Brown

== People ==
- Víctor Angles Vargas (1927–2025), Peruvian historian
- Alan McManus, Scottish professional snooker player, whose nickname is Angles

== Journals ==
- angLES, a student-run academic journal initiated and based at University College Freiburg
- Angles, a student-run academic journal in the Department of English Studies at Sophia University
- Angles, a journal published semi-annually by the Société des Anglicistes de l’Enseignement Supérieur

== Other uses ==
- Angles, a house built by Quintus Quincy Quigley and subsequently owned by Alben W. Barkley

== See also ==
- Angel (disambiguation)
- Angle (disambiguation)
