= Sarah Buttall =

British silversmith (died 1775)

- Died: 1775
- Occupation: Silversmith

Sarah Buttall (died 1775) was an English silversmith.

Little is known of Buttall's life and career, save that she was active in London, where she lived in the parish of Minories. A largeworker, she registered her mark on 10 May 1754, and was active until around 1772. She was the widow of founder Jonathan Buttall, who died in May 1754; in September of the same year she married gunmaker John Bumford. Her burial was recorded at St Botolph's in 1775.

The National Museum of Women in the Arts owns a 1771 lemon strainer, in George III style, by Buttall; in addition, the collection also contains a George III dish cross of the same year attributed to her.
