= Elizabeth Muns =

British artist

- Occupation: Silversmith

Elizabeth Muns (active c. 1768) was an English silversmith.

Little is known about Muns; she is believed to have been the widow of a largeworker named John Muns, but this is uncertain. Classified as a smallworker, she registered a mark on 3 May 1768, giving an address of 3 Bull and Mount Street in St Martin's Le Grand. She appears to have been active for only a year after the death of her husband, although her mark has been noted on a George III fish slice of 1804, as well as possibly on a 1795 punch ladle.

A George III sauce boat of 1768 attributed to Muns is owned by the National Museum of Women in the Arts in the United States. A pair of tripod saltcellars by her were purchased by Bathurst Skelton shortly before his death, and were among the items his wife, Martha Jefferson, brought with her at her subsequent marriage to Thomas Jefferson; they are now in the collection at Monticello.
