= Byse =

Byse may refer to:

== People ==
- Fanny Byse (born 1849), British sculptor
- George M. Byse (1858–1936), American farmer and politician

== Places ==
- Byse, Shimoga, India
