= Flora MacDonald (disambiguation) =

Flora MacDonald was an 18th-century member of Clan Macdonald of Sleat.

Flora MacDonald may also refer to:

- Flora MacDonald (politician) (1926–2015), Canadian politician and humanitarian
- Flora MacDonald Denison (1867–1921), Canadian activist, journalist and businesswoman
- F. M. Mayor (Flora Macdonald Mayor), English novelist and short story writer
- Flora Macdonald Reid, British, Scottish painter
- Flora MacDonald College, women's college in Red Springs, North Carolina, United States of America
