= Susanna Barker =

British silversmith

- Occupation: Silversmith

Susanna (sometimes Susannah) Barker was an English silversmith.

Classified as a smallworker, Barker worked in London, registering her date mark on 25 June 1778. A second mark was registered on 12 August 1789, with a third following on 26 August the same year. At one time she worked out of a shop at 16 Gutter Lane; from 1790 until 1793 she is recorded as working as a goldsmith at 29 Gutter Lane. Silversmith Robert Barker, who registered his own mark in 1793, may have been her son. Barker specialized in the making of wine labels, and was noted especially for her star-shaped and eye-shaped designs.

Three wine labels by Barker, dated to 1792, are owned by the National Museum of Women in the Arts. The Victoria and Albert Museum owns a silver bottle ticket by her, dated to around 1800.
