= Angular =

Angular may refer to:

== Anatomy ==
- Angular artery, the terminal part of the facial artery
- Angular bone, a large bone in the lower jaw of amphibians and reptiles
- Angular incisure, a small anatomical notch on the stomach
- Angular gyrus, a region of the brain in the parietal lobe
- Angular vein, formed by the junction of the frontal vein and supraorbital vein

== Other uses ==
- Angular (web framework), an open-source web platform
  - AngularJS, the first incarnation of Angular
- Angle, having an angle or angles
- Angular diameter, describing how large a sphere or circle appears from a given point of view
  - Angular diameter distance, used in astronomy
- Angular Recording Corporation, a British independent record label

== See also ==
- Angle (disambiguation)
