= Peate =

Peate is a surname. Notable people with the surname include:

- Enid Peate (1883–1954), English artist
- Iorwerth Peate (1901–1982), Welsh poet and scholar
- Rod Peate, American poker player
- Ted Peate (1855–1900), English cricketer

== See also ==
- Peat (surname)
