= Holaday =

Holaday is a surname. Notable people with the surname include

- Bryan Holaday (born 1987), American baseball player
- Sarah Holaday (died 1754), English silversmith
- William P. Holaday (1882–1946), American politician

== See also ==
- Holiday (surname)
- Holladay
