= Homa Vafaie Farley =

Iranian artist

- هما وفایی
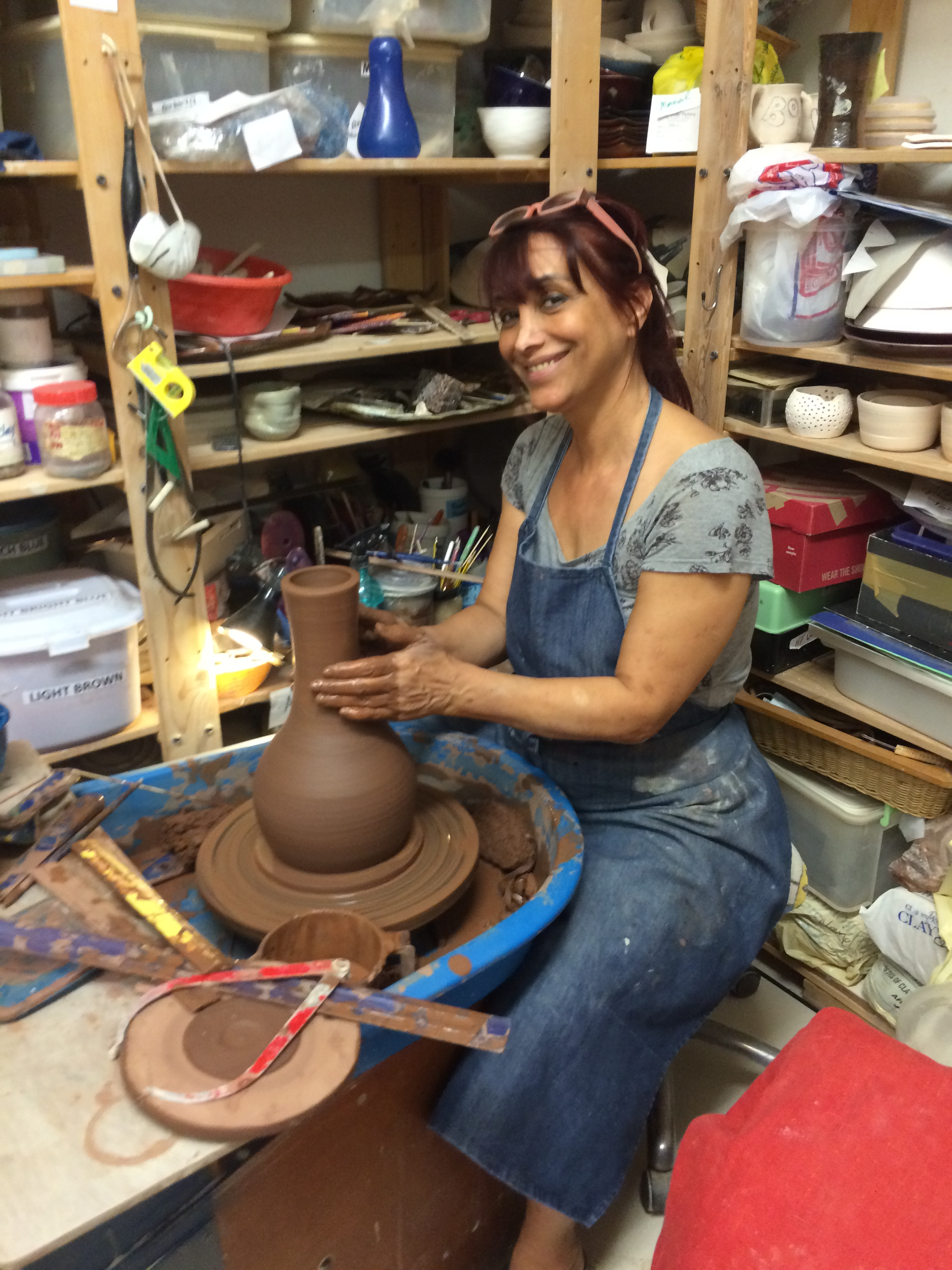
- Homa at the wheel
- Born: Homa Vafaie; Tehran, Iran
- Other names: Homa Farley, Homa Vafaie-Farley
- Education: Glasgow School of Art
- Occupations: Potter, ceramic designer
- Website: Official website

Homa Vafaie Farley (Persian: هما وفایی) is an Iranian-born potter and ceramics designer. She lives in Abu Dhabi.

== Biography ==
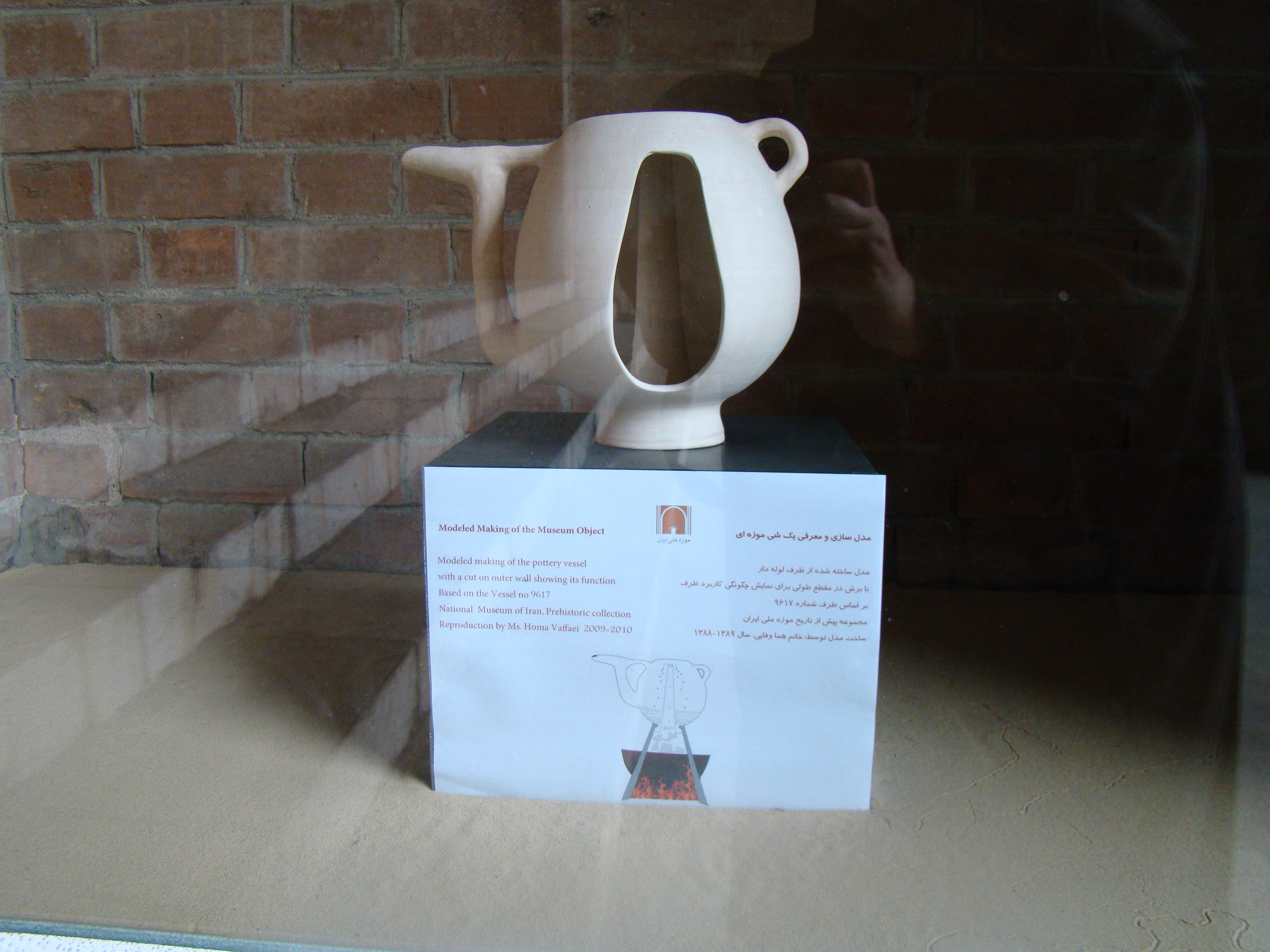
Homa's Pot in the National Museum, Iran

Homa Vafaie was born in Tehran, Iran. She grew up near Mount Damavand. As a teenager, she decided to move to the United Kingdom to study English and had originally wanted to be a poet.

After meeting her husband, Michael Farley, in Iran, they married and now have two children. Homa didn't take up pottery until after her children were born. After a brief encounter with a potter's wheel at a market in 2001, Homa signed up for summer school at South Nottingham College and Carrington Pottery. Farley decided to study ceramic design at the Glasgow School of Art and graduated with a BA degree. Her teachers included Archie McCall, Bill Brown, Jane Hamlyn, John McGuire, Tony Franks, Greg Daly and Ken Eastman.

Farley spent time in Japan in 2002, where her style and taste in ceramics changed. Farley is also a keen martial artists she received her 1st dan black belt under the guidance of Master Kang Kyo Sik, followed by 2nd and 3rd dan black belts, and then in 2013 was awarded a 4th dan honorary black belt. She was teaching martial arts in various countries in the Middle East, where she lived. Homa was the first woman to receive a black belt in Hapkido Hoi Jeon Moo Sol in the Middle East.

In November 1994, she founded the Abu Dhabi Pottery Establishment which was opened by HRH Sheikh Tahnoon Bin Saeed Al Nahyan. The Abu Dhabi Pottery was opened as a center to teach the Art of Pottery to all ages, interest levels, etc. as well as have a gallery to display original pieces created by Homa.

In 2000, Farley was invited to hold a solo exhibition of her work in the Abigneh Glassware Museum in Tehran. Following her exhibition, two of Farley's pieces were placed on permanent display at this museum.

In August 2012, Farley became the only contemporary artist to have her work displayed in the National Museum of Iran (Iran Bastan) after researching and recreating an intricate, 4,000-year-old pot.
