= John Robertson Reid =

British artist

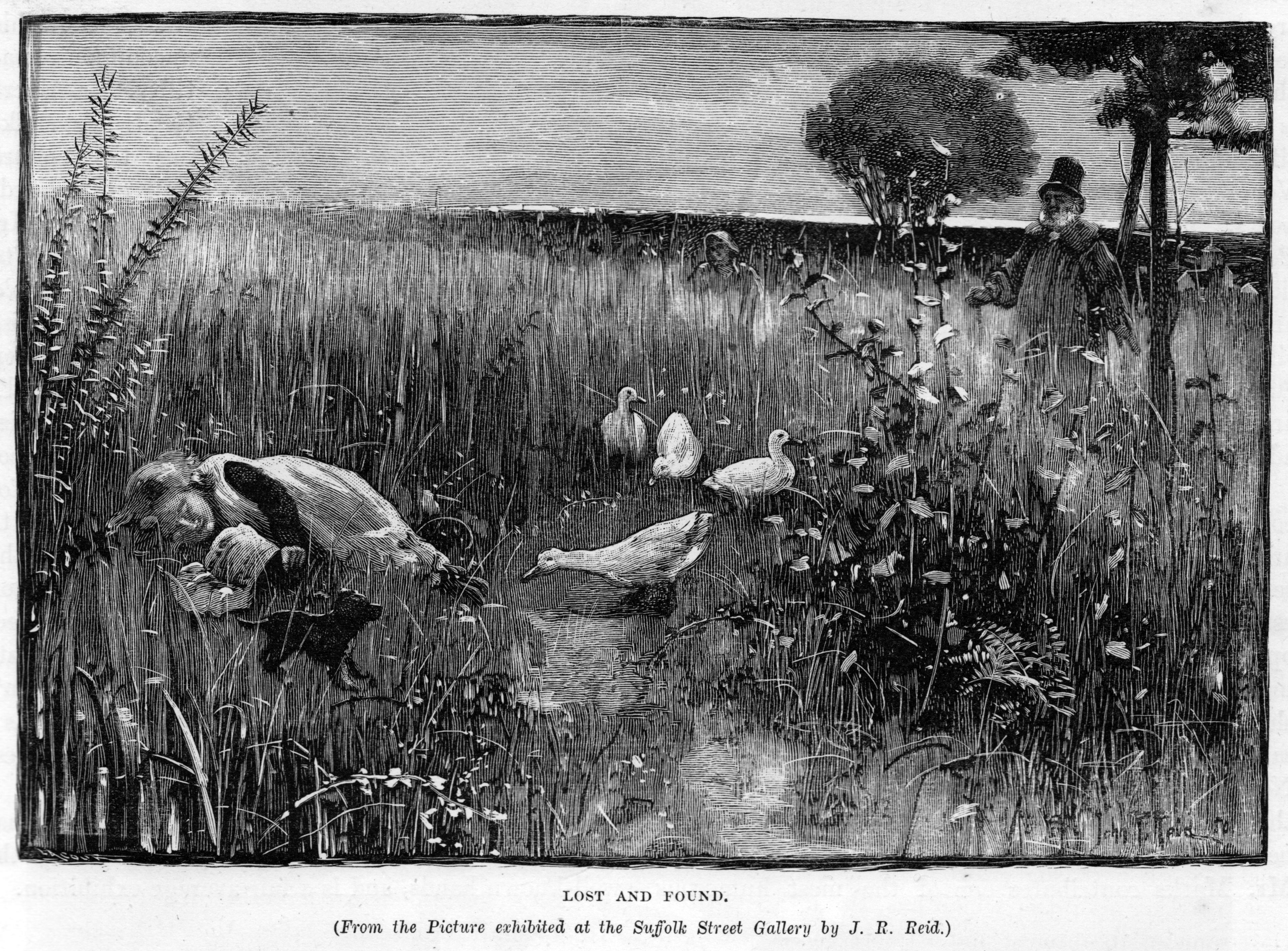
Victorian engraving of his painting "Lost and Found", circa 1880. Public domain.

John Robertson Reid (6 August 1851 – 10 February 1926) was a Scottish painter who spent his early working life in Surrey, and then from the early 1880s in Cornwall in the wild south-west of England. He became the president of the Society of British Artists in 1886 and the Society of Sculptors, Painters and Gravers in 1898. These posts gave him an entree into London society, and from the early 1900s he made his home in London. In Reid's later years, the young Sir Winston Churchill used to paint outdoors in the company of Reid.

He trained under George Chalmers and William MacTaggart. His mature style was influenced by the move in painting toward rural Naturalism (Sir George Clausen) and the French Realists (Jules Bastien-Lepage) and also owes a little to Impressionism. He first found success with natural outdoor scenes of the Surrey countryside, and was notable at the time for painting his scenes entirely on location, with the use of hired local people posing in the scene. He also painted notable rural cricket match scenes, one of which now contain details of interest to cricketing historians. This is A Country Cricket Match, painted in the grounds at the rear of The Well House, West Sussex.

His sisters, Lizzie Reid and Flora MacDonald Reid (1879-c.1929), were also exhibiting artists. Reid was the great-uncle of Sir Norman Reid, Director of the Tate Gallery.
