= Jo Budd =

English artist

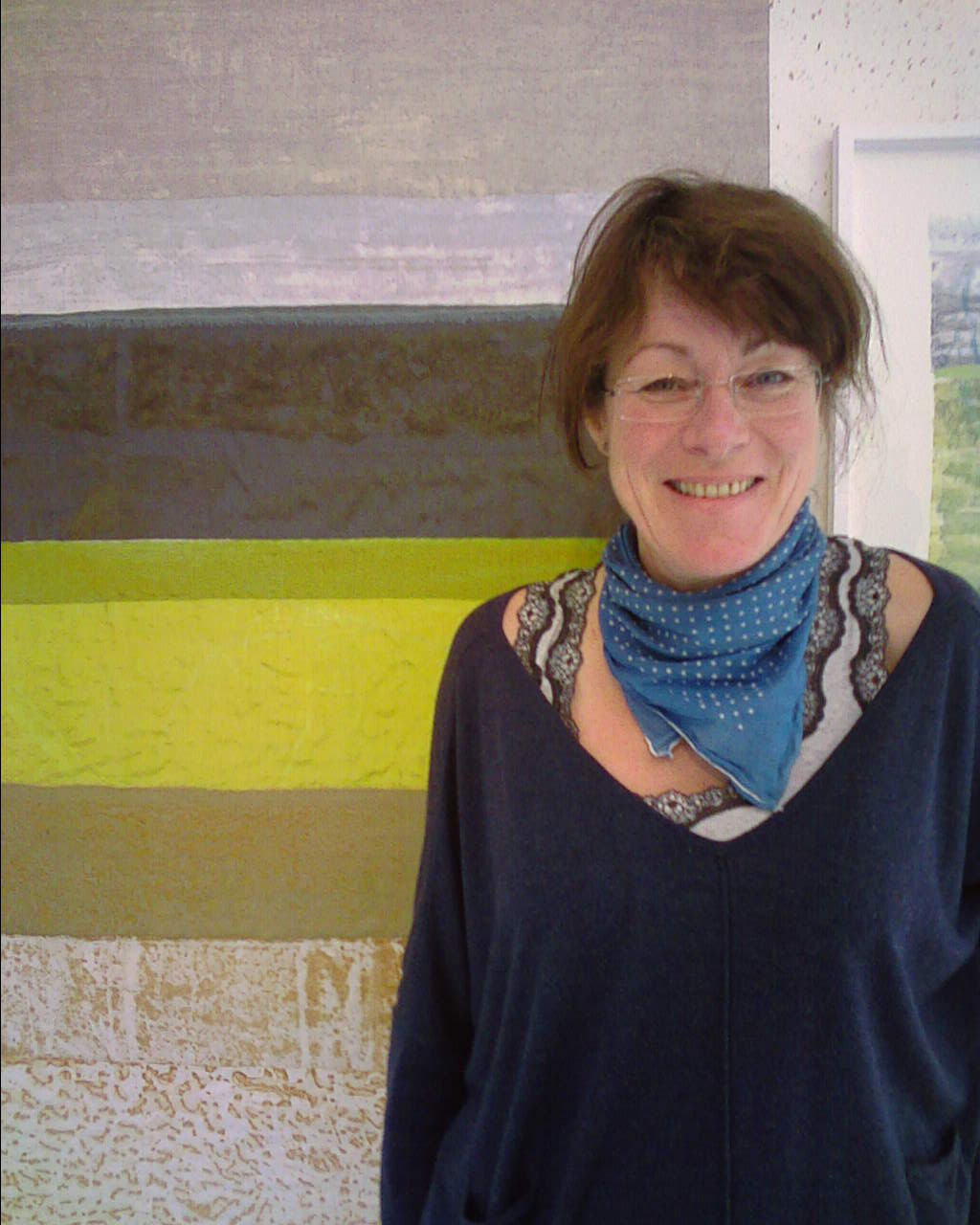
- Jo Budd in her studio in 2010
- Born: Josephine Budd; Norwich
- Education: Newcastle University
- Known for: Quilting

Jo Budd (fl. 1980–present) is an English artist specialising in creating art from textiles. She was trained as a fine artist, and her work could be described as quilt art, though it also frequently contains collage or printing elements.

== Biography ==
Josephine Budd was born in 1961 in Norwich. She completed her Fine Art education in Newcastle University, then began practising her art and teaching at places like West Dean College. She is known for her art work using quilts, collage and printing. She has also used fabrics that she hand-dyed, using materials such as rust.

Budd has worked on commissions, and her work is in collections such as the Victoria and Albert Museum. Budd's use of landscape in her work led Edexcel to recommend her as an artist for British Art and Design GCSE students to study in 2010.

In 2024 she was involved, and her work was exhibited in a shop in Fakenham.

== Private life ==
Budd lives near the Norfolk and Suffolk border with her partner, Brian Excell. She has one son.

== Work ==
- Corrugated Iron (1998)
- Fields of Green (1999)
- Oil Rig (1996–1998) – 250 cm × 319 cm (98 in × 126 in)
- Rust Series (2007)
- Summer/Female – Sewn collage – 170 cm × 314 cm (67 in × 124 in)
- Winter/Male (2009) – Hanging – 320 cm × 179 cm (126 in × 70 in)

== See also ==
- List of British artists
- List of English women artists
- List of quilters
- Mary Farmer
