= Magdalen Feline =

British artist (died 1796)

- Died: 1796
- Occupation: Silversmith

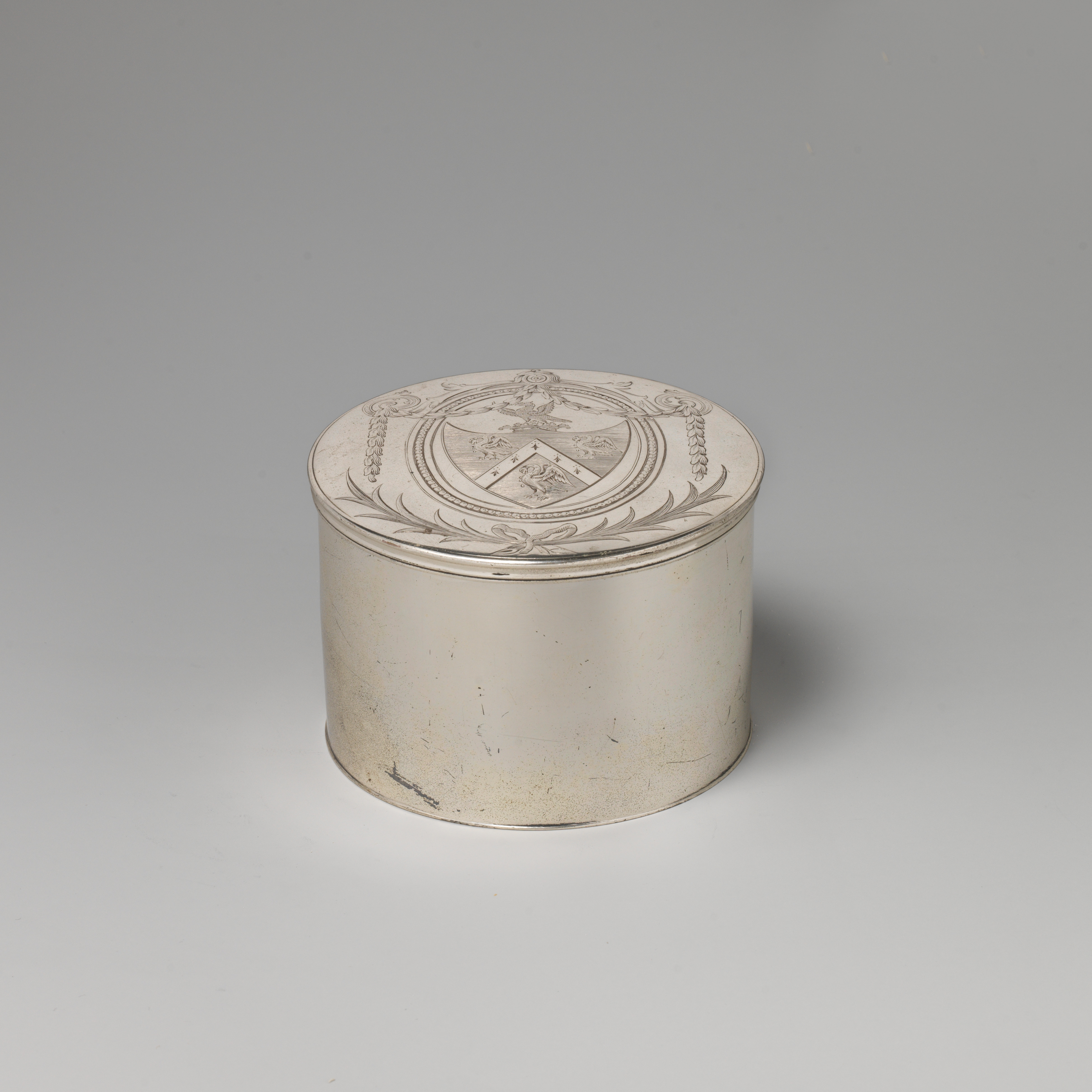
Small silver box, 1771–1772

Magdalen Feline (sometimes Fellen or Pheline) (died 1796) was an English silversmith.

Feline was the widow of largeworker Edward Feline, and herself was classified as both a largeworker and a plateworker during her career. Her first mark was registered on 15 May 1753; a second mark followed on 18 January 1757. She gave an address of King Street in Covent Garden. Among those for whom she worked during her career were George Booth, 2nd Earl of Warrington, and his heir and her husband, Lord and Lady Stamford.

A box by Feline, made between 1771 and 1772, is currently in the collection of the Metropolitan Museum of Art. The National Museum of Women in the Arts owns a George II lamp stand of 1751 and a George II kettle on lamp stand of 1756. Feline also created the mace of the South Carolina House of Representatives, which dates to 1756 and is reputedly the only such pre-Revolutionary mace remaining in use in the United States. Four other maces by her exist in England. Also surviving is her will, dated 10 June 1796.
