= Alice Sheene =

English silversmith

Alice Sheene was an English silversmith.

Sheene was married to the largeworker Joseph Sheene until his death; she registered her own mark on 29 April 1700. She, too, was classified as a largeworker, with an address of Ball Alley, Lombard Street, London. She remained active until around 1715.

A set of three casters by Sheene, dated 1701/2, is currently in the collection of the Art Institute of Chicago. A Queen Anne tankard with cover, dated 1706, is owned by the National Museum of Women in the Arts. A tazza of uncertain date, but likely from around 1714, is held by the Israel Museum. A variety of other items bearing her mark have also been recorded.
