= Roma Babuniak =

English artist

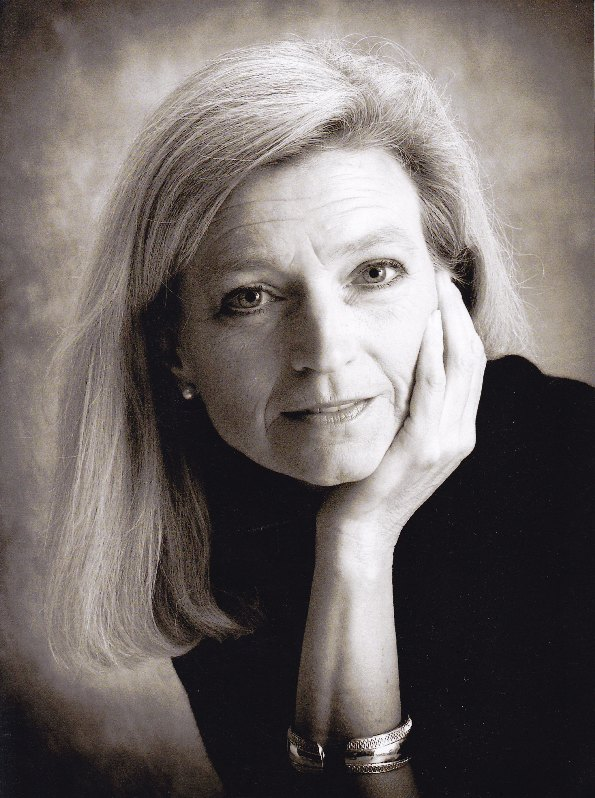
- Born: 25 March 1952; England
- Education: University of Salford; Sheffield Hallam University
- Known for: China and porcelain designs
- Website: romababuniak.com

Roma Babuniak (born 25 March 1952) is an artist whose work is associated with bone china and unglazed biscuit porcelain. She lives and works in Germany and France She has won many prizes and awards, in 1986, the 1st International Ceramics Contest Mino, Japan, (Award with Honorable Mention for outstanding achievement) and the 1999 Premio Diputacio da Valencia; International BiennalManises, Museu de ceramic de Manises, Spain among others.

== Biography ==
After completing an Art Foundation Degree from University of Salford, formerly known as Salford College of Technology 1971–73, Babuniak went on to Sheffield Hallam University formerly Sheffield School of Art and Design 1973–76 studying under Professor Tony Franks, where she gained a Bachelor of Arts degree in fine art and sculpture, with Film and Photography as subsidiary subjects under Professor Tom Ryall.

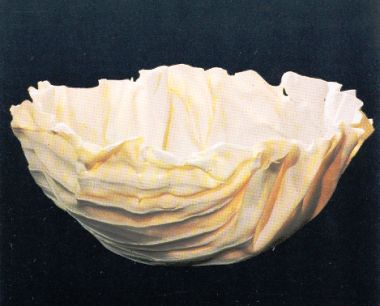
Vessel 1988 Porcelain, 53 cm Private Collection London, UK

Babuniak's career as a professional artist began in North Wales in 1980 when she was awarded a grant by the Welsh Arts Council for a solo exhibition. In 1981 she moved to Germany, where she has a studio at Gmund am Tegernsee in Bavaria.

The 1980s saw the development and acceptance of her work by galleries and exhibitions in England, Germany, Italy, France and in Japan. In 1992, Babuniak exhibited in the "Encuentro" exhibition with Carmen Sanchez and Lotte Reimers at the Gonzalez Marti Museum in Valencia, Spain. In 1999 she was awarded the Premio Diputacio da Valencia at the international Biennial in Manises. In 2004 Babuniak received the L’Alcalaten prize at the international biennial in L'Alcora, Spain.

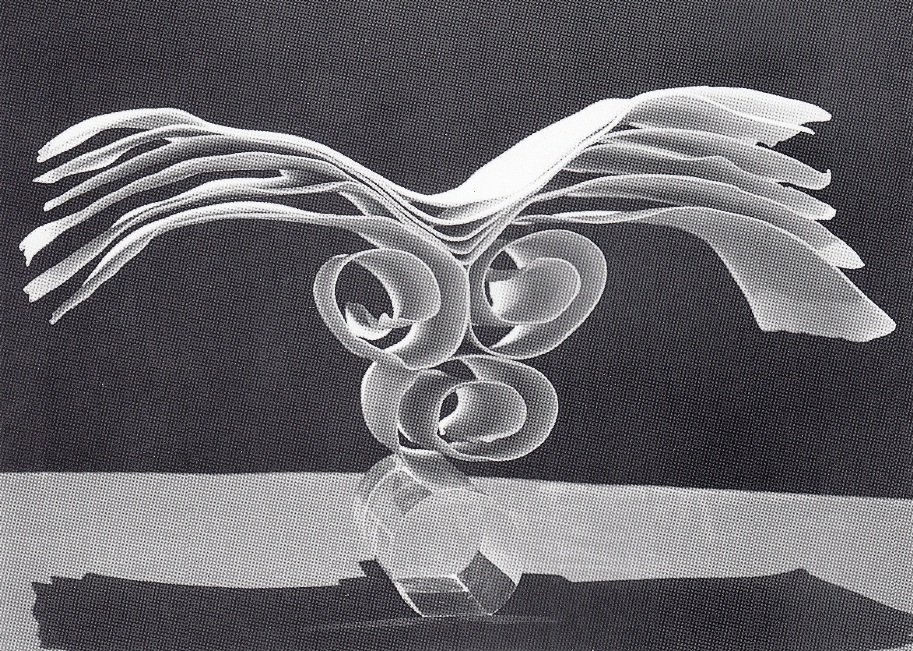
Flying Roofs 1990 Plexiglas, porcelain 35 x 16 x 16 cm Private Collection UK

Selection for the Chelsea Crafts Fair, London in 1988/89/92/95 brought her into contact with the British Arts Council's Contemporary Applied Arts with whom she exhibited in 1994/95 and other collectors including Sir John Makepeace and innovative exhibitions such as at Pulbrook and Gould 's Westonbirt School in London. Work was purchased for the collection at the Victoria and Albert Museum, London, and exhibited at The Scottish Gallery in Edinburgh under the curatorship of Amanda Game where it was purchased for the Royal Museum of Scotland, now under the management of the National Museum of Scotland. Babuniak's work has been exhibited in Mino in Japan, where she received honourable mentions at international exhibitions, and also in Kyoto. In 2005 she was invited as an artist-in-residence to Shigaraki in Japan and from this followed a solo exhibition, Cross-over, under the curatorship of Hiroshi Kawaguchi at the Noritake Garden Gallery in Nagoya.

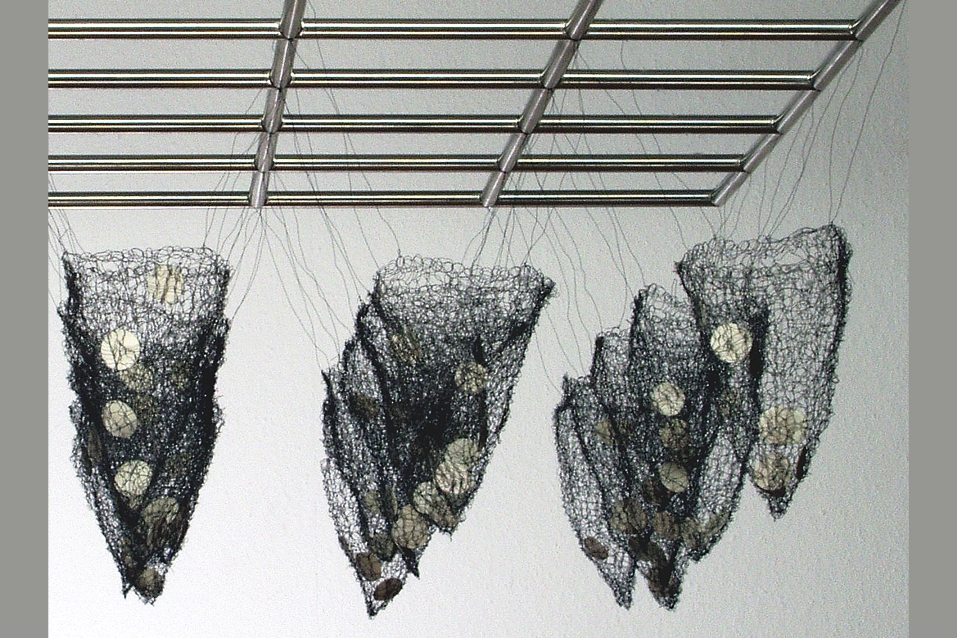
Hanging Nets, Stainless steel, knitted wire, porcelain 100 x 100 x 38 cm

In 2008 at the "Junges Porzellan" exhibition in Selb, Germany, Babuniak was approached by Jürgen Schärer, author of Auf den Punkt gebracht and project leader in Meissen, who invited her to become part of the design team of ceramic artists on the project to celebrate 300 years of the Meissen Porcelain. However, following the threat of bankruptcy, a radical overhaul, of the Meissen Porzellanmanufaktur by Dr. Christian Krutzke, saved the Porzellanmanufaktur but resulted in the project being abandoned.

== Work ==
The earlier years of her career saw experimentation projected from organic forms. These works intentionally never evolved into functional objects, as she rejected function in favour of a greater power of expression.

By the 90's, the incorporation of other materials such as stainless steel and precious metals, reveals a more transcending aspect of her sculpture, delineating and architectural in tone. New work has taken reference from elements of earlier work.

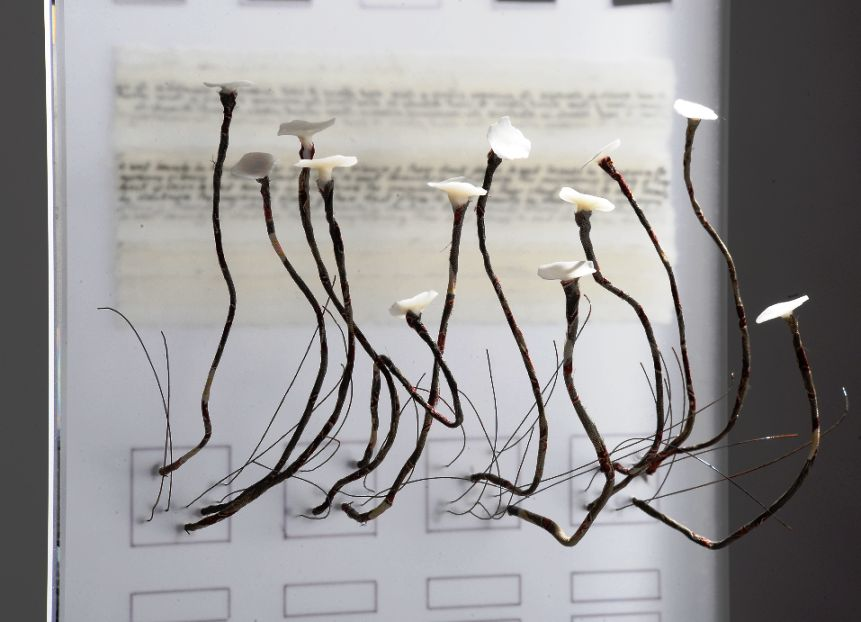
View KVII B 2009 Plexiglas, bone china, ink, kimono silk, wire 100 x 25 x 6 cm

Babuniak's work is minimalist, disciplined and reserved, drawing on suburban landscapes where the subject matter is reduced to the essential characteristics. Her use and juxtaposition of apparently incongruous materials: bone china, porcelain, Poly(methyl)methacrylate, fine wire, stainless steel, and paper create tension within the harmony of the pattern.

In addition to international awards and plaudits, Babuniak has a following of private and public collectors and publications about her work have appeared in many countries.

== Collections ==
- Bayerische Staatsgemäldesammlung, München, Germany
- City Art Gallery, Manchester, England
- City of Kapfenberg, Austria
- City Museum, Varazdin, Croatia
- Collection of John Makepeace, Fars, Beaminster, Dorset, England
- Dresdner Bank, München, Germany
- Faenza International Ceramics Museum, Italy
- Grassi Museum, Leipzig, Germany
- Museum für Angewandte Kunst, Frankfurt, Germany
- Museum of Kyoto, Japan
- Museu L’Alcora, Spain
- Museo Nacional Gonzalez Marti, Valencia, Spain
- Museu Manises, Spain
- Neue Sammlung, München, Germany
- Raiffeisenbank, Germany
- National Museum of Scotland, Edinburgh
- Sammlung Hinder/Reimers, Schloss Villa Ludwigshöhe, Edenkoben, Germany
- Sammlung Hoffmann, Berlin, Germany
- Sammlung Paetzold, Schloß Friedenstein, Gotha, Germany
- Sammlung Thiemann, Schloß Rheinbeck, Hamburg, Germany
- Shigaraki Museum of Modern Ceramics, Cultural Park, Japan
- Universalmuseum Joanneuem, Graz, Austria
- Victoria & Albert Museum, London, England

== Art Ventures ==
In 1987 Roma Babuniak founded the Studio Galerie in Gmund, Germany showing artists such as Vladimir Strelnikov a member of the Odessa Group, Soviet Nonconformist Artists, and German expressionist Georg Dudek.

Demands of her own career brought a temporary halt to the Studio Galerie which was relaunched in 2009 and focused on the concept of contemporary international artists from Germany and Japan: Christian Heß, Takao Inoue, Herbert Klee, Albert Lohr, Akashi Murakami, Christine Ott, Angelika Sieger, Georg Thumbach and others.

2001–2009 she founded and curated "Windows for Show" in Tegernsee, Germany. This was an innovative concept which brought together six interregional artists who exhibited together for 3 months in an environment not traditionally associated with art exhibitions, but which promoted direct exposure to the public.

Babuniak has been a member of the AK68 Art Society in Wasserburg am Inn, Germany since 1998. From 2008 until 2013 she served on the Board, on the consulting panel. In this time, she was instrumental in instigating the exhibitions of Albert Lohr, Christine Ott with Christian Heß and Stephanie Müller.

In 2016, she was invited to be involved in the founding and curating of a newly built, international gallery in Kalamunda, Western Australia, The gallery was opened in May 2016 by the then Minister for Culture John Day MLA, and featured the work of Georg Thumbach and Akashi Murakami. Amongst other artists exhibited were Georg Dudek, Angelika Sieger, Matthew Curtis, Godfrey Blow, Christian Hess, Ukrainian artists belonging to the Odessa group. The Pandemic forced the closure of the gallery and following the strict travel restrictions imposed by the government of Western Australia it was not until January 2022, that Roma Babuniak was able to return to Europe.

== Exhibitions and Events ==
=== Exhibitions ===
- 1976 Degree Show, Mappin Art Gallery, Sheffield, England
- 1981 Kunstkammer Dr. Paul Köster, Mönchengladbach, Germany
- 1983/86/05 Concorso Internazionale, Museum Faenza, Italy
- 1984 1st World Triennial of Small Ceramics, Museum Zagreb, Jugoslawia
- 1985 Zeitgenössische Keramik', Spitalspeicher, Offenburg, Germany
- 1986 Concorso Internazionale, Museum Faenza, Italy
- 1986 1st International Ceramics Contest, Mino, Japan, Award with Honorable Mention for outstanding achievement
- 1986 1st Kyoto International Craft Competition, Kyoto, Japan, Award with Meritorious Achievement
- 1987 'Aspekte Zeitgenössische Keramik aus Europe'
- 1987 Kulturamt Stuttgart and Badisches Landesmuseum Karlsruhe, Germany
- 1988 Museum für Moderne Keramik, with Seung Ho Yang, Germany
- 1989 Galerie L, with Robin Welch and Elizabeth Pluquet, Hamburg, Germany
- 1990 Internationale BIennale, Vallauris, France
- 1990 'Moderne Unikate aus 14 Ländern', Schloß Rheinbeck, Hamburg, Germany
- 1991 Solo exhibition, Royal Exchange, Manchester, England
- 1991 Angermuseum Erfurt, with Pit Nicolas, Brigitte Schuller, Klaus Lehmann, Germany
- 1992 International Ceramics Competition, Mino, Japan, Award with Honorable Mention
- 1993 The Scottish Gallery, with Lotte Reimers, Edinburgh, Scotland
- 1993 Galerie im Hörsaal, Leipzig, Germany
- 1993 Galerie Painen, with Jürgen Grenzemann, Berlin, Germany
- 1994 Contemporary Applied Arts, London
- 1995 Cecilia Coleman Gallery, with Dorothy Gill, London
- 1997 Biennale Europea, Manises, Spain
- 1998 Adrian Sassoon, London, England
- 2002 XII Biennal Esplugues, Barcelona, Spain
- 2002 Perron Preis exhibition, Erkenbert Museum, Frankenthal, Germany
- 2003 Alt trifft Neu“, Sammlung Paetzold, Schloß Friedenstein, Gotha, Germany
- 2004 'Hautnah', Haus der Kunst, München, Germany
- 2005 Artist- in- Residence, Shigaraki, Japan
- 2006 Biennale de la Sculpture, Mamer, Luxembourg
- 2007 5. International Biennial, Kapfenberg, Austria; Award: Purchase Prize of the City of Kapfenberg
- 2008 Mino International Ceramics (1st selection) Japan
- 2009 'Multiplex', City Museum of Varazdin, Croatia
- 2009 Galerie Bruckmühl with Sylvia Hatzl, Germany
- 2011 'Sehnsucht nach der Ferne', conceptual members exhibition, AK68, Wasserburg am Inn, Germany
- 2012 Galerie ob der Kap with André Lambotte, and Kathrin Fischborn, Luxembourg
- 2013 'Gefäß und Skulptur', Grassi Museum, Leipzig, Germany
- 2014/15 Mandjar Art exhibition, Mandurah, Western Australia

== Events ==
- 1978–1980 Exhibitions with the North Wales Artists Association, UK
- 1988/89/92/95 Chelsea Crafts Fair, London, UK
- 1985 'Unikate', Handwerkskammer für Oberbayern 30.11–8.12. Germany
- 1986 'Das Flair des Kunsthandwerks', Handwerkskammer Oberbayern, München, Germany
- 1993 'Eating- In', House and Garden Show, Business Design Centre London, UK
- 2003 'Tischkultur', in co-operation with Toni Bösterling, Fairs in Augsburg, Braunschweig, Rosenheim, Germany
- 2003–2012 Tegernseer Kunstausstellung, Germany
- 2002–2012 Gmundart, Germany
