= Meg Woolf =

British artist (1923–2023)

Margaret Valerie Jean Nellist (née Woolf; 10 December 1923 – 9 April 2023), better known as Meg Woolf, and later Meg Woolf-Nellist, was a British artist, known for her watercolour paintings and for her sculptures.

== Biography ==
Margaret Valerie Jean Woolf was born at Thanet in Kent on 10 December 1923, and studied at the Bromley School of Art and at the Beckenham School of Art between 1939 and 1942. After a further period of study at the Brighton School of Art, Woolf taught art at colleges in Britain, including at the Rachel McMillan College of Education, and in Bermuda.

Woolf had a solo exhibition in 1948 at the Hove Museum and Art Gallery. Woolf exhibited work at both the Royal Academy in London and with the Royal Society of British Artists, with the Artists' International Association and at commercial galleries in Britain and overseas. As well as painting with watercolours, Woolf created sculptures in stone, wood and ivory.

Woolf died on 9 April 2023, at the age of 99.
