= Phyllis Roberts =

British artist (born 1916)

Phyllis Kathleen Roberts née Aspden (born 11 June 1916) was a British sculptor and painter, notably of portraits

Roberts was born in London and studied at the Hornsey School of Art. Throughout her career she exhibited at the Royal Academy in London, at several notable commercial galleries in Britain and in France at the Paris Salon. At the Salon, she won a silver medal in 1959 and a gold medal in 1964. She was an elected member of the Royal Institute of Oil Painters and also showed works with the Contemporary Portrait Society and the Royal Society of Portrait Painters. For a time she lived at Aldwick in Sussex.

The Royal Institute of Oil Painters award an annual Phyllis Roberts Award in her memory to a promising artist under the age of 30.
