= Mary Ramsden =

British painter (born 1984)

Mary Ramsden (born 1984) is a British painter, who lives and works in London. Her work has been compared to Cy Twombly, with abstract gestural movements on the canvas.

== Biography ==
Ramsden studied art at Leith School of Art (LSA) and Edinburgh College of Art. She continued her education and graduated in 2013 from the three-year postgraduate art school at the Royal Academy of Arts, RA, in London, studying with artists Richard Kirwan, Brian Griffiths and Vanessa Jackson. While still at the RA Ramsden's first solo gallery show was held in 2012 at Pilar Corrias and a second was held there in January 2015.

In 2016–2017, Ramsden's first museum solo exhibition, titled "Mary Ramsden: (In / It)" was held at the Aspen Art Museum. The title of the exhibition was inspired by a Marianne Moore poem "Poetry" and a line break that is found in the poem.

Her abstract, painterly works combine gestural marks with amoeba-like shapes. Though seemingly simple and seamlessly assimilated, Ramsden's paintings are structured with a subtle thoughtfulness that allows for contemplative consideration. With slight, deliberate adjustments in color, mark-making, and scale, her works depict a progressive language that draws viewers in to examine each smudge and detail. Most of the artist's pieces are dominated by a single color, while other hues push towards the edges of the surface. In more recent pieces, Ramsden has begun generating multifaceted, meditative compositions by applying and then wiping away multiple layers of paint.
