= Emily Sarah =

British artist

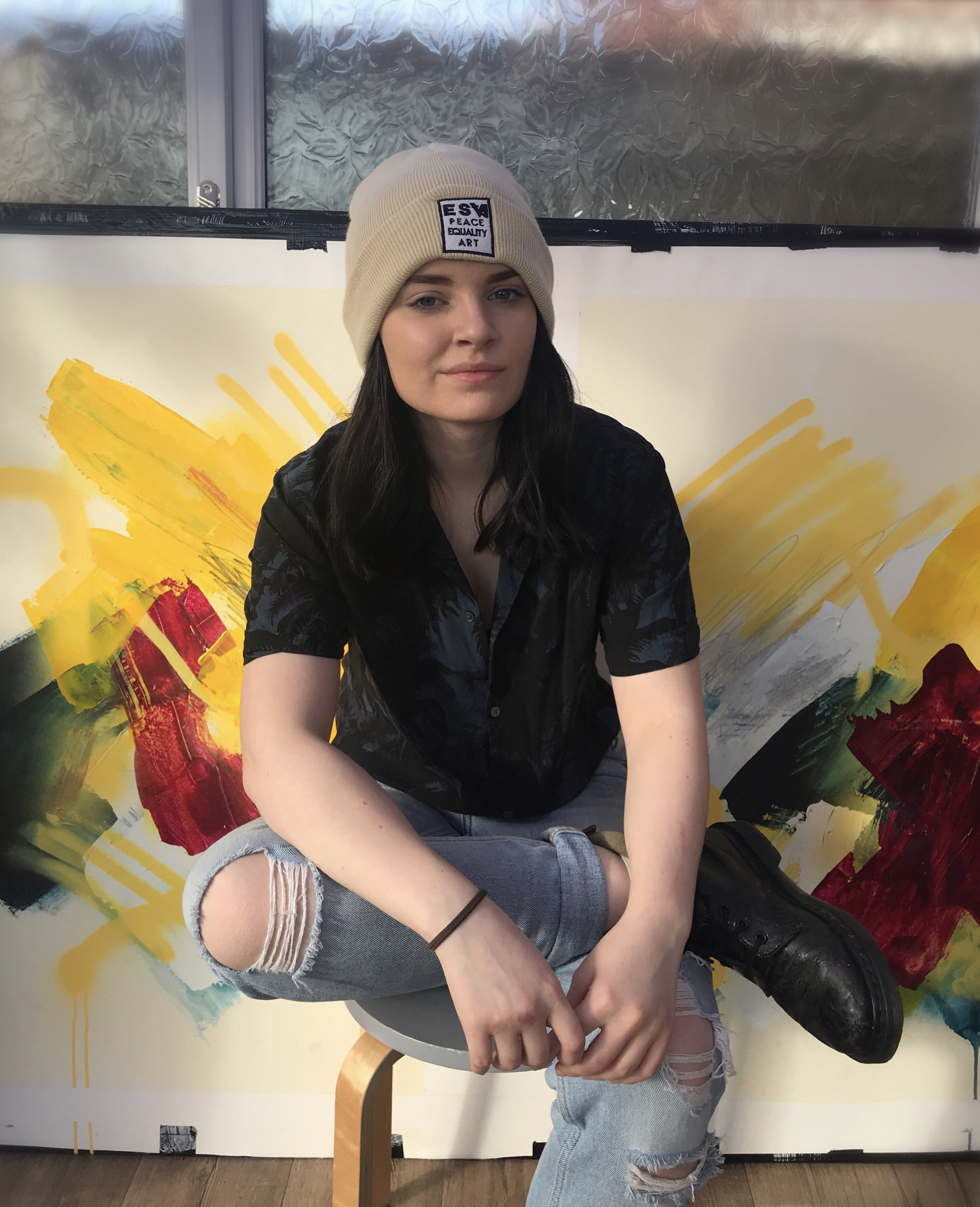
- Emily Sarah, 2019
- Born: Rustington, West Sussex
- Education: The Littlehampton Academy College
- Known for: Portrait painting Abstract expressionism
- Website: www.emilysarahart.com

Emily Sarah is an English artist and entrepreneur. She is known for her modern abstract portraits and large-scale abstract works. Her artwork has been featured in galleries and private collections in Los Angeles, Chicago, Edinburgh and Chelsea.

== Biography ==
Sarah grew up in Rustington on the south coast of England. She finished college at the age of eighteen and had already begun to be mentored by Lisa Ridgers from the age of fifteen; the same year she began to exhibit.

Sarah worked under the street art pseudonym Cobz in the first few years of her career and was best known for her urban figurative line painted with Lisa Ridgers.

Sarah uses her abstract work as a way of portraying the nature around her as abstract formations. Citing aerial photography, the Sussex Coast and Edinburgh as her primary examples for inspiration, Sarah attempts to replicate the unique textures and colors she finds within the sights she sees in her works.

Sarah works mainly with acrylics, using paint and spray paints as her two mediums alongside materials like charcoal and pastels. Primarily Sarah works on canvas of larger sizes but occasionally works on paper, buildings for large scale murals. Sarah features much of her work on the microdesigner platform WESCOVER.
