= Team Angle =

Team Angle is a professional wrestling tag team and stable that has had many incarnations led by Kurt Angle in both World Wrestling Federation/Entertainment (WWF/WWE) and Total Nonstop Action Wrestling (TNA).

- Team ECK/Team RECK (WWF), consisting of Kurt Angle along with Christian and Edge and later Rhyno.
- Team WWF (WWF), consisting of a fan favorite character of Angle and other past and current multiple fan favorites during the Invasion storyline. Angle was the leader after the original leader Stone Cold Steve Austin betrayed him and joined The Alliance and before The Rock made his return. This was also the only full-time stable where Angle was a fan favorite.
- The World's Greatest Tag Team (WWE), consisting of Kurt Angle along with Charlie Haas and Shelton Benjamin.
- The Honor Society, an alliance, consisting of Kurt Angle along with Luther Reigns and Mark Jindrak.
- The Angle Alliance (TNA), consisting of Kurt Angle (with Karen Angle) along with A.J. Styles and Tomko.
- The Main Event Mafia (TNA), consisting of Kurt Angle along with Booker T (with Sharmell), Kevin Nash, Scott Steiner, and Sting.
- The term Team Angle has also existed referring to one-time alliances such as:
  - Team at Survivor Series (WWE), consisting of Kurt Angle along with Bradshaw, Chris Benoit, Hardcore Holly, and John Cena.
  - Team at Survivor Series (WWE), consisting of Kurt Angle along with Carlito Caribbean Cool, Luther Reigns, and Mark Jindrak.
  - Team at Lockdown (TNA), consisting of Kurt Angle along with Jeff Jarrett, Rhino, Samoa Joe, and Sting.
  - Team at Lockdown (TNA), consisting of Kurt Angle along with Booker T, Kevin Nash, and Scott Steiner.
