= Freda Coleborn =

British artist

Freda M Coleborn (née Milward; 1911–1965) was a British artist known for her designs in glass and embroidery.

== Biography ==
Coleborn was born in India and was educated at Leeds High School in England and then studied at the Royal College of Art in London, becoming an Associate of the Royal College in 1936. As well as working as an art teacher, Coleborn produced designs in glass and embroidery and painted in both oils and gouache. She exhibited works at the Royal Academy in London and at major international exhibitions of glass works. Among those who purchased glass pieces by Coleborn was Queen Elizabeth II.

In 1935 she married the artist Edwin Keith Coleborn (1909–2005), who was the principal of a number of art schools throughout his career. The couple lived at Downe in Bromley and both designed stained glass windows for their local church, St Mary's.
