= Beckenham School of Art =

Bromley School of Art, UK

- Type: Art School
- Active: 1908–1962
- Location: Beckenham, Kent, England
- Website: ravensbourne.ac.uk

Beckenham School of Art was an English art school located at 20 Beckenham Road, Kent from 1908 to 1962.

== History ==
Beckenham School of Art was founded in 1908, and was located at 20 Beckenham Road, Beckenham, Kent. Due to an oversubscription of students, it amalgamated with Bromley School of Art and Sidcup School of Art to become Ravensbourne University London in July 1962. In 1950, Beckenham School of Art achieved Second place in a National Competition with the Royal College of Art being placed First, and Canterbury School of Art Third.

== Exhibitions ==
An extensive list will be challenging to locate due to the incompleteness of archives of this long since closed institution.

- British Furniture Exhibition at Earl's Court, London in February 1950.
- Beckenham School of Art Exhibition in July 1952.
- Beckenham School of Art Exhibition of artists, who studied at the school in the late 1940s to 15 Apr 1991.

== Notable academic staff ==
- Amy Katherine Browning (World War Two)
- John Cole (Principal)
- Robin Day (designer)
- George Fry
- Laurence Norris
- Hilary Stebbing
- Hellmuth Weissenborn
- Percy Yabsley

== Notable alumni ==
- Bridget Allen (1947–50)
- Athene Andrade
- Graham Arnold (1947–52)
- Tom Asbridge
- Evelyn Ballentine (1946–52)
- Gerald Barry (British journalist)
- Sven Berlin
- David Bowie
- Robert Bradford (1961–3)
- Kenneth George Budd (1941–4)
- Graham A Clark, ARCA
- Joan Connew
- Maurice Day
- Honor Dobbs
- Mary Farmer, Painting (1958–61) known best as Tapestry Artist
- Daphne Fedarb
- Ernest Fedarb
- Overton Fuller
- Gerald Gardiner (1919–23)
- Charles Gardener
- Elsa George
- Robin Gray (1958–62)
- Alan Green (1949–53)
- Helen Grūnwald (1941-4)
- Jacqueline Anne Herbert (1946)
- Gertrude Hermes
- Rose Hilton
- Jocelyn Horsbrugh
- Walter Hoyle (1940-2)
- David Inshaw (1959–63)
- Ronald Jewry
- Robert Juniper (World War Two)
- John Leech
- Eileen Lewenstein
- Aletta M Lewis
- Denis Lucas
- Keith Stephen Lucas
- Elizabeth MacFadgen
- Sandy MacKilligin
- Charles Mahoney
- Peter Midgley (1947–51)
- John Miles (1952-)
- John Morley (1957–62)
- Marjorie Nevshehir Owen
- Monty Parkin
- Hilda Chancellor Pope
- Mary Potter nee Attenborough (1916–8)
- Ian Ribbons
- Richard Rush
- Mollie Russell-Smith
- Robert Sawyers
- Mary Thornbery (1947-9)
- Carol Walklin
- David Warwick
- Ted Watkins
- Adrian Williams
- Margaret Wilson
- Jessie Young
