= Maud Marian Wear =

British artist (1873–1955)

- Born: 8 December 1873; London, England
- Died: 1955 (aged 81–82); Hove, East Sussex
- Education: Royal Academy Schools
- Known for: Painting

Maud Marian Wear (8 December 1873 – 1955) was a British artist, known as a painter and miniaturist.

== Biography ==
Wear was born in London to a local woman and a wine merchant's clerk from Yorkshire who later became a newspaper correspondent. Wear was raised in Hackney and privately educated at Eastbourne before entering the Royal Academy Schools in February 1896. During her five years at the Academy Schools Wear won a silver medal for a painting of the draped figure. Subsequently she combined teaching at the London County Council Central School of Arts and Crafts with an exhibition career that was noted for its portraits and figure studies.

Wear showed a total of 45 works at the Royal Academy in London and also exhibited with the New English Art Club, the International Society of Sculptors, Painters and Gravers, the Royal Miniature Society, the Glasgow Art Gallery, the Walker Art Gallery in Liverpool and the Paris Salon.

For a time, Wear lived at Blockley in Gloucestershire but moved between several locations in southern England during her life. She died at Hove in East Sussex.
