= May Aimée Smith =

English painter and engraver

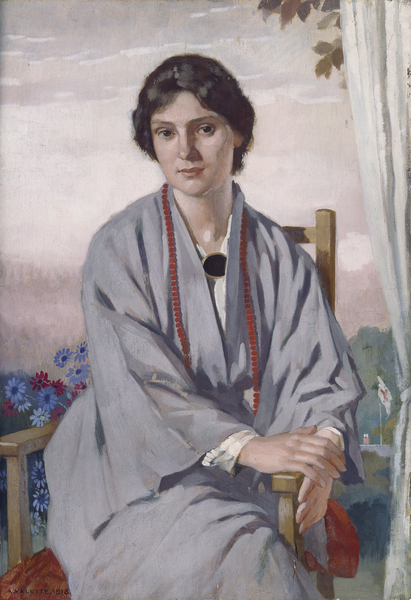
Smith by Pierre Adolphe Valette, 1918

May Aimée Smith (1886–1962) was an English painter and engraver.

== Early life and education ==
Smith was born 16 March 1886 near Manchester, England. She studied wood engraving in Paris under Dmitri Galanis.

== Career ==
She had shows with the Society of Wood Engravers and at the Salon d'Automne in Paris. In 1939/1940 she was included in the Seventh Annual Exhibition of Lithograpy and Wood Engraving at the Art Institute of Chicago.

Her work is included in the collections of the Seattle Art Museum, the Auckland City Art Gallery, the Nottingham City Museums and Galleries, the Museum of New Zealand Te Papa Tongarewa, the Victoria & Albert Museum, London the Whitworth Art Gallery, Manchester and Manchester Art Gallery.

Smith died in 1962 at Birch Vale, Stockport, Cheshire, England.
