= Maria Pixell =

British painter

- Died: 1811
- Known for: Landscape painting

Maria Pixell (died 1811) was a British landscape painter who worked in the medium of both oil paint and watercolor. She lived and worked in London, Hampshire and Maidenhead.

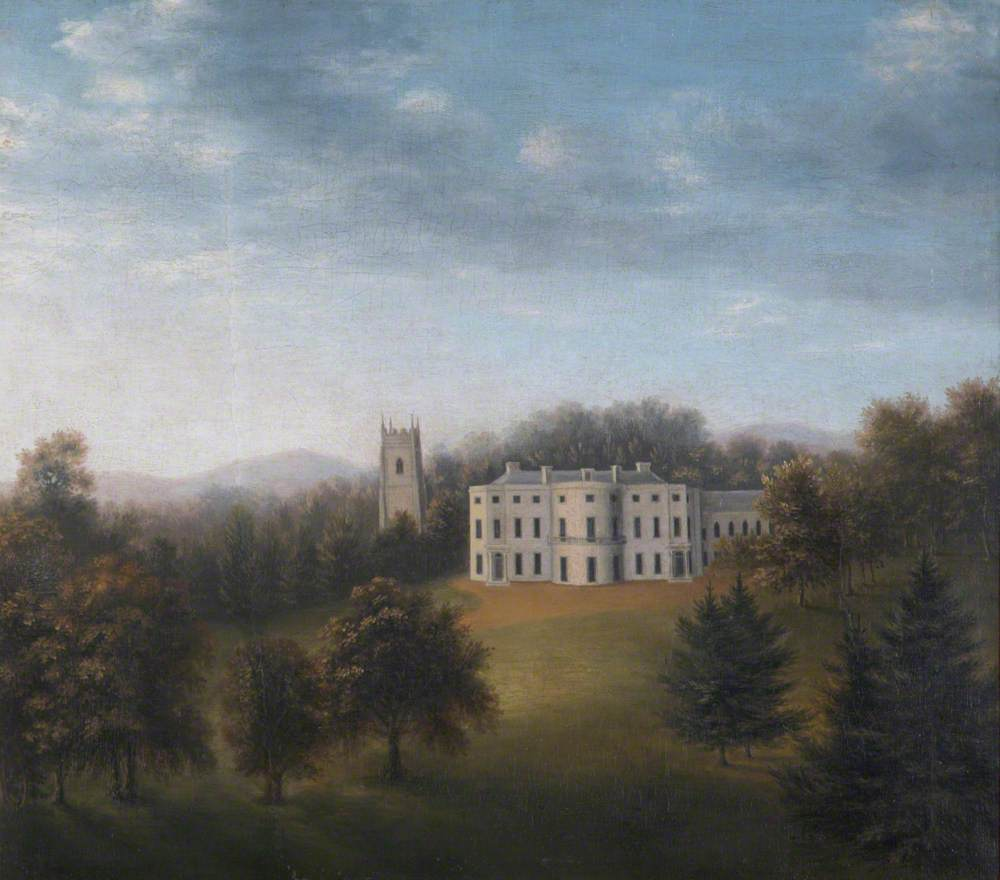
A View of Arlington Court and St James's Church Tower from the Park, Devon

Pixell exhibited her paintings between 1793 and 1811 at the Royal Academy of Arts and between 1809 and 1811 at the British Institution. A number of her paintings reside in the collection of, and are on display, at Arlington Court in Devon.

A search on familysearch.org showed a Maria Pixell born 18 May 1762, christened 9 July 1762 at Edgbaston, Warwickshire, England, and died 1844 at Kings Norton, Worcestershire. There is not certain that this is her, however, her 1793 exhibits at the RA (Nos. 256 & 258) were views of Edgbaston Park, Warwickshire so it seems likely.

== Notable collections ==
- View of Old Arlington Church (St James's), Devon, 1783-1811, Arlington Court, National Trust
