= A. B. S. Sprigge =

British artist

A.B.S. Sprigge
- Born: 3 March 1906; London, England
- Died: 1980 (aged 73–74)
- Education: Royal College of Art
- Known for: Sculpture

A.B.S. Sprigge (1906–1980) was a British sculptor, known for her work in marble, stone and wood.

== Biography ==
Miss Sprigge was born in London and, throughout 1926 and 1927, studied at the Royal College of Art where her tutors included Henry Moore. During the 1930s she produced sculptures in marble, stone and wood and had pieces exhibited at major London galleries including Agnews and the Leicester Galleries. In 1936 Sprigge had a solo exhibition at the Bloomsbury Gallery in London.

For a time she lived, and maintained a studio, at Loughton in Essex but later in her life, Sprigge moved to Llanpumpsaint in Wales.
