= Maggie Mitchell (artist) =

British artist (1883-1953)

- Born: Margaret Richardson; 1883; Camberwell, London
- Died: 1953 (aged 69–70); Yeovil, England
- Education: Goldsmiths School of Art; Royal College of Art
- Known for: Sculpture

Maggie Richardson Mitchell née Margaret Richardson (1883–21 February 1953) was a British artist and sculptor.

== Biography ==
Mitchell was born at Camberwell in London and studied sculpture at the Goldsmiths School of Art and at the Royal College of Art between 1904 and 1908 and again in 1910. During her career she exhibited portrait busts and statuettes at the Royal Academy in London, at the Royal Scottish Academy in Edinburgh, the Royal Glasgow Institute of the Fine Arts and at both the Paris Salon and the Walker Art Gallery in Liverpool. Mitchell's portrait subjects included Thomas Hardy, William Rothenstein and Lord Snell.

Mitchell was an Associate member of the Royal Society of British Sculptors and, from 1929, a member of the Royal Society of British Artists. Mitchell was elected a member of the Society of Women Artists in 1931. She was married to the artist George Joseph Mitchell and, from the 1920s, lived at Norton Sub Hamdon in South Somerset, and died in 1953 at Yeovil.
