= Kathleen Parbury =

British sculptor (1901–1986)

Kathleen Ophir Theodora Parbury
- Born: 23 August 1901; Borehamwood, England
- Died: 1986 (aged 84–85); Northumberland, England
- Education: Slade School of Fine Art
- Known for: Sculpture

Kathleen Ophir Theodora Parbury (23 August 1901 – 1986) was a British artist and sculptor, known for the large sculptures she created for British churches and internationally. She was elected a Fellow of the Royal Society of British Sculptors in 1966.

== Biography ==
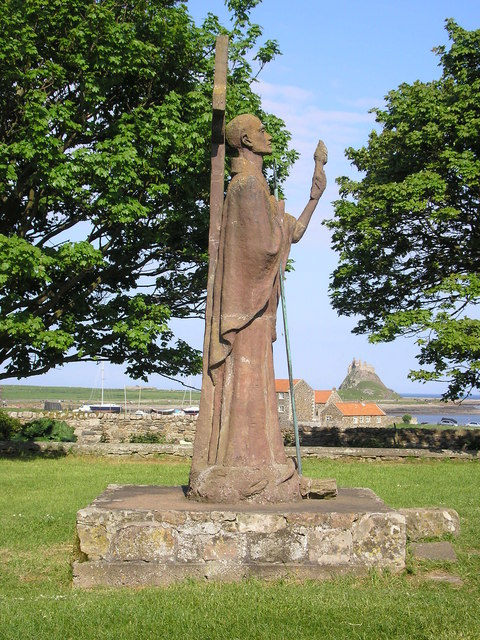
St Aidan, 1958, Lindisfarne

Parbury was born at Borehamwood in Hertfordshire and, between 1920 and 1924, studied at the Slade School of Fine Art in London where her teachers included the sculptor James Havard Thomas. Parbury went on produce portrait works and figures, mainly working in bronze, but also other materials. Among her portrait sculptures are figures of Field Marshal Sir Gerald Templer, Sir Vivian Fuchs and Dame Sybil Thorndike.

Parbury created a number of large sculptures for British churches. Her largest work was a sculpture group of several figures, The Risen Christ, for an exterior wall of the church of St Michael and All Angels at Bemerton in Wiltshire. The work consists of a Christ figure with two angels and symbols representing the choir of angels. In 1958, Parbury produced an eight foot Madonna and Child for St Mary's in West Twyford in London and the following year created four sculptures of angels for St Columba's Church in Sutton Coldfield. Her 1961 large figure of Saint Aidan is on the facade of the Church of Saint Aidan of Lindisfarne in East Acton. Parbury also created a concrete statue of Aidan for the island of Lindisfarne in 1958. Other examples of her work are in churches in Canada, Ireland and Nigeria and in museums in New Zealand and Ohio.

Throughout her career, Parbury exhibited with the Royal Society of British Sculptors and was elected a Fellow of that body in 1966. She also exhibited with the Society of Women Artists and the Royal Scottish Academy. With Josefina de Vasconcellos, Parbury organised an exhibition of Christian art, The Gospel in Sculpture, at St John's Wood in London during 1955. Parbury also wrote a book on the Lindisfarne saints. For many years Parbury lived on Lindisfarne, having previously lived in London and Edinburgh.
