= Lizzie Mary Cullen =

British artist

Lizzie Mary Cullen is a British artist situated in London.

== Biography ==
Cullen was a production assistant for Warner Bros., working on the Harry Potter films, prior to venturing into the art world. After graduating from Goldsmiths in 2008, Cullen has exhibited in London, New York and Paris and has been profiled in The Independent, on BBC London and in Wired.

Her work is rooted in psychogeography and mapping urban landscapes. In 2011 she was named one of the Hot 50 people making a difference in design by Design Week magazine. Her clients include Zizzi, MTV, Harvey Nichols, HTC, First Direct, Somerset House, and Penguin Books. She is also a regular contributor to Design Week magazine, and is featured often in many leading design publications. Clients include Universal, MTV, Lewis Hamilton, Oxfam and The Guardian.

In September 2010, Cullen hosted her first solo exhibition in aid of homelessness. All proceeds from the exhibition were donated to The Big Issue Foundation. The exhibition attracted much attention, in particular that of Tom Felton, Daniel Radcliffe and Big Issue founder John Bird.

== Awards ==
- 2011 – Design Week Hot 50
- 2012 – Images 36: Best of British Illustration, Gold Design Award
