= Bloody Angle =

Bloody Angle may refer to:

- The Bloody Angle (Lexington and Concord), a skirmish during the British retreat from the Battles of Lexington and Concord of the American Revolution (1775)
- The Bloody Angle (Gettysburg), an area of the Gettysburg battlefield of the American Civil War (1863)
- The Bloody Angle (Spotsylvania), an engagement at the Battle of Spotsylvania Court House of the American Civil War (1864)
- "The Bloody Angle", a section of Doyers Street (Manhattan) in New York City's Chinatown
