= Elise D'Elboux =

British artist

- Born: 1870; Southampton, England
- Died: 1956 (aged 85–86)
- Education: Regent Street Polytechnic; Académie Julian; Royal College of Art
- Known for: Painting, illustration

Elise D'Elboux (1870–1956) was a British artist known as a painter and illustrator.

== Biography ==
D'Elboux was born and raised in Southampton. Her parents were Mary Jane (1846–1907) and Walter D'Elboux (1839–1896), an artist who was associated with the Ordnance Survey. After a private education in Southampton, Elise D'Elboux attended Hartley College in the city before studying in London at Regent Street Polytechnic and in Paris at the Académie Julian. She returned to London and studied at the Royal College of Art, RCA, from 1896 to 1899. While at the RCA, D'Elboux won national awards and a college silver medal. During her career, D'Elboux painted in a variety of media, produced illustrations and also held a number of teaching posts, most notably with the London County Council and also at the RCA. Among the publications she created illustrations for were The Girl's Realm, Century, Young Folks and Young England. She exhibited paintings at the Royal Academy in London, at the Walker Art Gallery in Liverpool, with the Royal Society of British Artists and with a number of local art societies in southern England. The Budapest Museum of Fine Arts holds examples of her work.
