= Caroline Byng Lucas =

British artist and printmaker

Caroline Byng Lucas, née Caroline Lucas, (1886–1967) was a British artist and printmaker who established the Millers Gallery and Millers Press in Lewes in Sussex.

== Biography ==
Born into an aristocratic family, Byng Lucas studied painting and sculpture in London, Paris and Rome during the 1920s and first exhibited works at the Galerie des Jeunes Peintres in Paris in 1928. In the 1930s she studied sculpture under John Skeaping and had solo exhibitions of her paintings at the Lefevre Gallery in 1934 and of her sculptures at the Leicester Galleries in 1939. In 1941, with her older sister Frances Byng Stamper, Byng Lucas established the Millers Gallery in a converted outbuilding at her home in Lewes. The Gallery acted as an arts centre with a programme of exhibitions, concerts and lectures. Although focussed on local artists they also hosted works by Vanessa Bell, Duncan Grant, Robert Colquhoun and Robert MacBryde. Kenneth Clarke was a visitor, E. M. Forster gave readings and there were performances by Peter Pears and a ballet evening featuring Lydia Lopokova. The Gallery hosted over 40 exhibitions, which included showing works by Matisse, Cezanne and Pissarro. Sculptures by both Barbara Hepworth and Henry Moore also featured. During the war, John Maynard Keynes, who was establishing the Council for the Encouragement of Music and the Arts at the time, was closely involved with the Gallery.

In 1945 the sisters established the Millers Press with the aim of promoting colour lithography. Among the works published were a set of six lithographs by Byng Lucas of Lewes and Brighton. In 1948, in conjunction with the Redfern Gallery, Byng Lucas set up the Society of London Painter-Printers to support artists in producing colour prints. The sisters disbanded the press and gallery in the mid-1950s due to their increasing frailty and died within a few months of each other in 1967. The sisters were not well regarded locally, being considered lacking as landlords and slow at paying their bills. They were little remembered until a 1987 article by Diana Crook and a 1989 exhibition at the Towner Gallery revived interest in both sisters. Both the British Museum and the Victoria and Albert Museum in London hold examples of prints by Caroline Byng Lucas.
