= Margaret Ryder =

British artist (1908-1998)

Margaret Elaine Ryder, later Margaret Vint (1908–1998), was a British artist.

== Biography ==
Ryder was born in Sheffield and, after attending Sheffield College of Art, was based in that city throughout her career. As a freelance commercial artist Ryder worked in a variety of media including oils, watercolours and pastels to produce landscape scenes, portraits and flower pictures. She also created miniatures on ivory and vellum and for a time served as a vice-president of the Royal Miniature Society. Ryder was also a member of the Society of Women Artists, a founder member of the Society of Botanical Artists and a president of the Sheffield Society of Women Artists. Throughout her career, alongside a series of solo exhibitions in Sheffield, Ryder exhibited works at the Royal Academy in London, at the Paris Salon, with The Pastel Society and with the Royal Institute of Painters in Water Colours.
