= Daisy Theresa Borne =

British artist

- Born: 18 July 1906; London, England
- Died: 1998 (aged 91–92)
- Education: Regent Street Polytechnic
- Known for: Sculpture

Daisy Theresa Borne (18 July 1906 –1998) was a British sculptor.

== Biography ==
Borne was born in London but travelled extensively as a child with her family and for a time lived in Moline, Illinois in the United States where her father owned a printing ink business. Her mother's occupation is not recorded. Borne returned to Britain and studied sculpture at the Regent Street Polytechnic and also developed her singing ability to the extent she was offered, but refused, professional roles. In 1933, she met Joyce Bidder, (1906–1999), who taught her to carve and with whom she set up a studio in Wimbledon in south London that they maintained together for some fifty years. Borne was a member of the Women's Amateur Rowing Association after World War II. She is also mentioned in an informal history of the 'Borne Regatta'.

Borne worked in a wide variety of materials, including plastic, marble, stone and wood to produce statuettes, figurines, fountains and works in relief. Between 1933 and 1971 she showed some 78 works at exhibitions of the Society of Women Artists and was elected an associate member of that body in 1949 and a full member in 1952. Borne was also, between 1932 and 1962 a regular exhibitor at the Royal Academy in London. She was an associate member of the Royal Society of British Sculptors and for a time served as vice-president of the Royal Society of Miniature Painters, Sculptors and Gravers. In 1987, the Fine Art Society hosted a two-women show of Borne and Bidder's work.

Borne exhibited her first piece in Palomina marble, Madonna of the Adoring Angels in 1939 at the Royal Academy. This was her first piece of a religious theme, which she would later specialise in.
