= Eve Kirk =

British painter

- Born: 22 July 1900; London, England
- Died: 1969 (aged 68–69); Siena, Italy
- Education: Slade School of Fine Art
- Known for: Painting

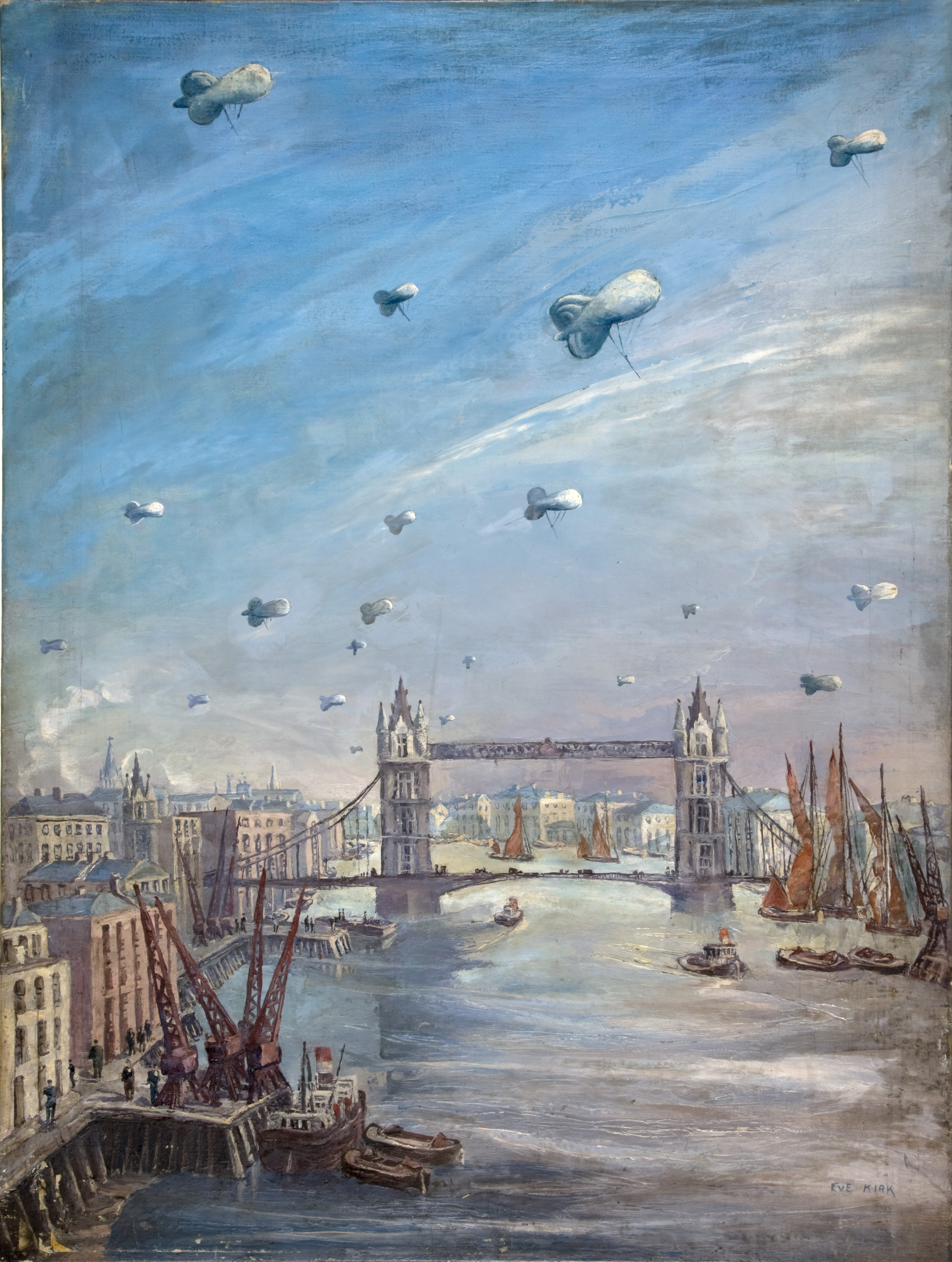
Tower Bridge by Eve Kirk, painted during World War II

Eve Kirk (22 July 1900 – 1969) was a British landscape and decorative painter.

== Life and career ==
Kirk was born in London on 22 July 1900. She studied at the Slade School of Fine Art from 1919 to 1922, and later travelled to France, Italy and Greece. Her first solo exhibition was at the Paterson Gallery in 1930. Augustus John - who later painted her portrait - wrote an introduction to the exhibition catalogue in which he said:

"With a curious swiftness and certainty she has captured a method, a technique which seems to provide a perfect means for the interpretation of the subjects of her choice, the streets, the quays and the market-places of Provence, Italy or London."

Kirk later exhibited at Arthur Tooth & Sons, in 1932 and 1935, and alongside Paul Nash in 1939 and at the Lefevre Gallery in 1949.

During the Second World War, Kirk worked for civil defence in London, but continued to paint and held an exhibition in 1943 at the Leicester Galleries. Her painting Bomb Damage in the City was shown as part of the exhibition of National War Pictures at the Royal Academy of Arts in 1945. She was commissioned to decorate the Roman Catholic Church of God The Holy Ghost, Penygloddfa in Newtown, Powys, in the mid-1940s. In the mid-1950s she emigrated to Italy and ceased to paint. She died in Siena in 1969.
