= Daphne Fedarb =

British painter and artist (1912-1992)

- Born: Daphne Brook; 1912; London, England
- Died: 1992 (aged 79–80)
- Known for: Landscape painting
- Spouse: Ernest Fedarb (m. 1932)

Daphne Fedarb née Brook (1912–1992) was a British painter and artist.

== Biography ==
Fedarb was born in London and studied art at the Beckenham School of Art between 1928 and 1930 and then studied at the Slade School of Art from 1931 to 1934. From 1936 to 1939 Fedarb studied at the Westminster School of Art where she was taught by both Mark Gertler and Bernard Meninsky. In 1932 she married the artist Ernest Fedarb and in 1935 they held their first joint exhibition at the Fine Art Society in London. Later in their careers the couple would have further joint exhibitions, notably at Sally Hunter Fine Art in 1986. Between 1961 and 1973 Daphne Fedarb was a regular exhibitor at the Royal Academy in London and also with the New English Art Club and the London Group and also in America. She was a member of the National Society of Painters, Sculptors and Gravers / Printmakers, and the Women's International Art Club. She was elected a member of the Royal Society of British Artists, RBA, in 1948 and won the RBA De Laszlo medal in 1982. Fedarb won first prize in the Laing Landscape competition in 1981 and two years later won second prize in the same contest.
