= Cecilia Webb =

British artist (1888-1957)

- Born: 25 March 1888; Stamford, Lincolnshire
- Died: 1957 (aged 68–69); Melton Mowbray, England
- Known for: Sculpture

Cecilia Webb (25 March 1888 – 1957) was a British sculptor.

== Biography ==
Webb was the daughter of the architect Morpeth Webb and was born at Stamford in Lincolnshire. Throughout her career, Webb made sculptures in bronze, clay and plaster. During the inter-war decades, she was a regular exhibitor at the Royal Academy in London, the Royal Scottish Academy in Edinburgh, the Royal Glasgow Institute of the Fine Arts and the Paris Salon. A 1949 ceramic model of the Holy Family by Webb is in Southwell Minster in Nottinghamshire. For the later half of her life, Webb lived at Melton Mowbray, where she died in 1957.
