= Hilary Simon =

British-born silk painter

Hilary Simon is a British-born silk painter. She is known for her development of techniques on silk and her unusual choice of subject, which in recent years has been strongly influenced by Central America. Simon is renowned for her collaborations. One of her more notable paintings, Rice Fields, was used in 2007 as a limited edition collectors cover for One Hundred Years of Solitude by the Nobel Prize-winning author Gabriel García Márquez.

As an artist, Simon has used ceramics and tiles as her media, in addition to designing gift wrap, posters and greeting cards.
