= Lilian Parker =

British artist (1874-1947

- Born: Lilian Gertrude Wells; 1874; Bolton, England
- Died: 1947 (aged 72–73); Weston-Super-Mare, England
- Education: Royal College of Art
- Known for: Painting, sculpture

Lilian Gertrude Parker née Lilian Gertrude Wells (1874–1947) was a British sculptor and painter.

== Biography ==
Lilian Parker was born in Bolton in Lancashire where her father was a Wesleyan minister, which led to the family also living in Bromsgrove and Lowestoft for some periods of time and Lilian being largely educated at Clapham Park in London. She studied at the Royal College of Art in London where she received several medals and won two Queen's Prizes in National Art School Competitions.

Throughout her career Parker created portrait busts and figures and also painted watercolours. She exhibited works at both the Royal Academy in London between 1902 and 1927 and at the Paris Salon and with the Société des Artistes Français. She also exhibited with the Royal Watercolour Society, the Royal Drawing Society and at the Walker Art Gallery in Liverpool. In 1902 she was elected an associate member of the Royal Drawing Society and in 1919 an associate of the Royal Watercolour Society. She lived and worked in London and in 1908 married Frank Parker, a school master, and died in 1947 at Weston-Super-Mare in Somerset.
