= Hilda Theobald =

British artist (1901–1985)

Hilda Theobald (1901 – 1985) was a British artist, notable as a modeller and sculptor of portrait busts.

== Biography ==
Theobald was born in 1901, at Soham in Cambridgeshire and attended St Edmund's School in Hunstanton. Her mother was a local Cambridgeshire woman and her father, who was originally from Norfolk, was a farmer. Although she had no formal art training, an interest in watercolour painting led to Theobald attending Saturday morning classes at the Norwich School of Art where she learnt clay modelling techniques. In due course, Theobald began casting her own sculptures, often portrait heads and busts, in resin, bronze and silver. She lived at East Dereham and had a number of solo exhibitions in the Norfolk and East Anglia region and, from the 1940s, took part in Norfolk and Norwich Art Circle exhibitions. Examples of her work include a font with four silver panels for a church at Toftwood, a sculpture in a church at Great Snoring, a bronze bust for a store at High Wycombe and portrait busts for collections in Texas, Kenya and Germany.
