= Amelia Blackburn =

English paper-cut artist

Amelia Blackburn was an English paper-cut artist active in the 1830s. Her work became popular enough in Victorian England that, for a time, a paper-cut artwork was called an "Amelia."

== Biography ==
Blackburn lived with a chronic illness or disability. Although less of a public figure than the English paper-cut artist Mary Delaney, she continued Delaney's influence on the popularity of paper-cutting as an art medium. Like Delaney, she also created "paper mosaicks."

Blackburn was active in the 1830s. She used common white kitchen paper for her paper-cuts, which she collaged together to form an image. Extremely thin cuts were used for certain details in her work, such as bird feathers or flowers. Some parts of her paper-cuts were left white, while others were painted using watercolor. Her technique of painting her work was sometimes done in shades, and mimicked a painting more than a colored paper collage.

Her style of paper-cut collage became popular enough in England that her pieces became known as "Amelias," her namesake. For years, this then became the term used more generally for paper-cut artwork in English society.

Blackburn also used pin-pricking as a technique to add fine details to her paper-cuts. Pricks were made by flipping the paper over, and puncturing through the back of the piece. This technique became popular through her work.

A few of Blackburn's papercuts are held by the British Museum in London. The works include pin-pricking and hand colouring.
