= Les Angles =

Les Angles is the name of several communes of France:

- Les Angles, Gard
- Les Angles, Hautes-Pyrénées
- Les Angles, Pyrénées-Orientales
