= Sarah Holaday =

British artist (died 1754)

- Died: 1754
- Occupation: Silversmith

Sarah Holaday (née Feram) (died 1754) was an English silversmith. Her last name is sometimes given as Holladay or Holiday, while her first name is sometimes given as Susan.

Holaday was married to largeworker Edward Holaday; after his death, she registered two sizes of mark on 22 July 1719; a sterling mark followed, on 15 June 1725. On 2 February 1722 she registered a Sun Insurance Policy. Classified as a goldsmith, she gave her address as the Golden Cup in Grafton Street in the Parish of St Anne's in Westminster. She took as apprentice David Meades Bishop, who was turned over to another shop in 1739, indicating that she may have ceased business by that time. Her will was proved on 18 May 1754.

The National Museum of Women in the Arts owns a George I two-handled cup of 1719 crafted by Holaday.
