= Athene Andrade =

British artist

- Born: 15 February 1908
- Died: 1973 (aged 64–65)
- Education: Central School of Arts and Crafts; Bromley School of Art; Beckenham School of Art
- Known for: Paintings, lithography

Athene Andrade (15 February 1908 –1973) was a British artist known for her paintings and lithographs.

== Biography ==
Andrade studied at the Central School of Arts and Crafts in London and at both the Bromley School of Art and the Beckenham School of Art. She often painted and sketched actors and theatre scenes. She exhibited at the Royal Academy in London, with the New English Art Club, the Society of Women Artists and with the National Society of Painters, Sculptors and Engravers. Andrade lived in Bromley in Kent and for a time taught at schools in London. The Victoria and Albert Museum in London holds examples of her work.
