= Freda Marston =

British artist

- Born: 22 October 1895; Hampstead, England
- Died: 27 March 1949 (aged 53); Hilterfingen, Switzerland
- Known for: Painting
- Spouse: Reginald St Clair Marston

Freda Marston (1895–1949) was a British painter and printmaker.

== Biography ==
Marston née Clulow was born on 22 October 1895 at Hampstead in north London. Between 1916 and 1920, she studied at the Regent Street Polytechnic School of Art where she was taught by Harry Watson and Terrick Williams. Marston exhibited at the Royal Academy in London, with the Royal Society of British Artists and the Fine Art Society. She was married to the painter Reginald St Clair Marston and lived for a time at Robertsbridge in Surrey. She was commissioned by London, Midland and Scottish Railway and British Railways to produce carriage prints and examples of her work are held in public collections in Eastbourne and Stoke-on-Trent. Marston died on 27 March 1949.

== Gallery ==
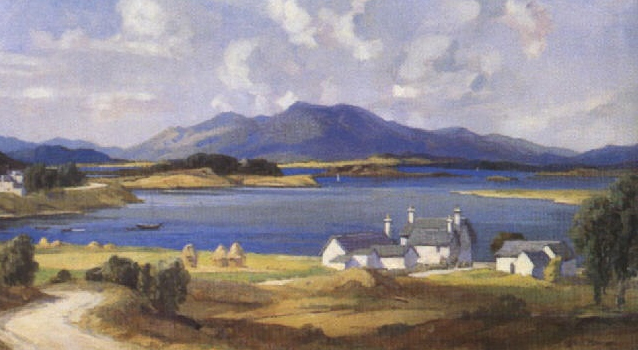
Coastal landscape

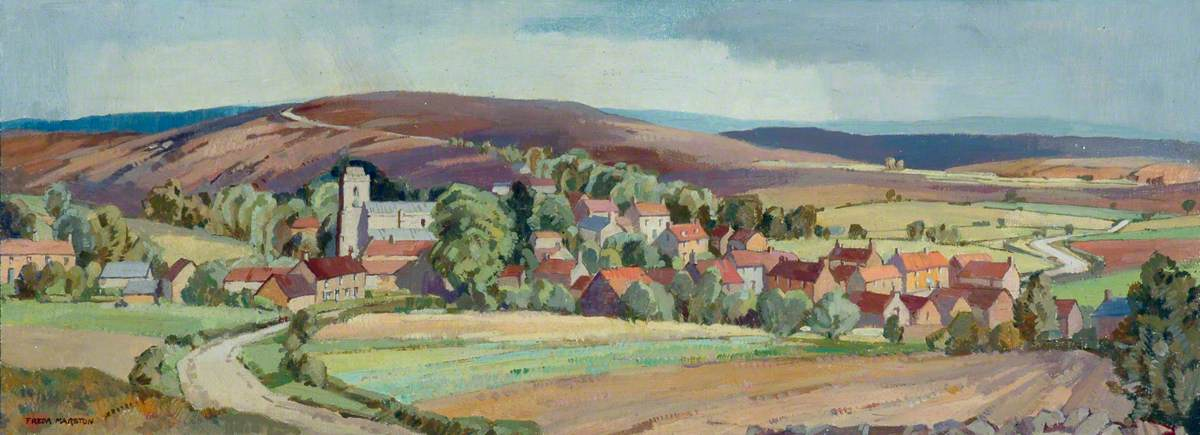
Lastingham

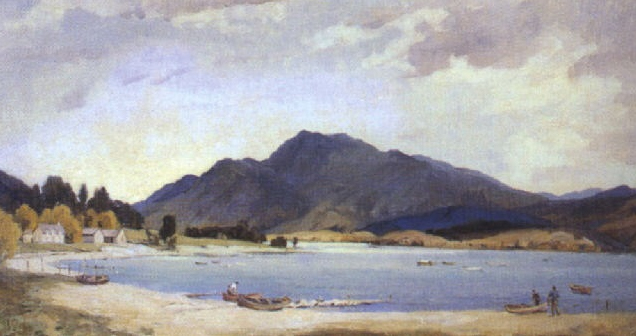
Mountainous landscape
