= Irene Newton =

British artist

Irene Margaret Newton (1915–1992) was a British artist, notable as a textile designer, painter and teacher.

== Biography ==
Newton grew up in Truro in Cornwall where she attended the High School for Girls before studying at the Truro School of Art from 1934 to 1938. She then worked as an art assistant at art schools in Stourbridge and in Hereford before taking a teaching post at the Elizabeth Gaskell College of Education in Manchester. Alongside her teaching duties, Newton created textile designs both for hand weaving and machine production. She was elected a member of the Royal Society of the Arts in 1940 and was recognized as a licentiate by the Society of Industrial Designers. Newtown also exhibited works with the Royal Society of British Artists, the Royal Birmingham Society of Artists, the United Society of Artists and at the Paris Salon.

Newton spent the later part of her life at Southport in the north-west of England.
