= Joyce Bidder =

English sculptor (1906–1999)

Muriel Joyce Bidder (5 January 1906 – 26 February 1999) was an English sculptor who, over a long career, created works in a variety of materials.

== Biography ==
Bidder was born at Wimbledon in south-west London and studied at the Wimbledon School of Art, where she was taught by the sculptor Stanley Nicholson Babb.

In 1933, she met Daisy Borne, whom she taught to carve. The two set up a studio together at Wimbledon and became life-long companions. Bidder worked in a variety of materials, including bronze, green slate, marble, terracotta, stone and wood to produce statuettes, group figures and reliefs. She often worked with woods such as walnut, Spanish chestnut, oak and mahogany. Her subjects included sporting events, such as the sculpture group Tackled, and depictions of labourers at work.

Bidder regularly exhibited at the Royal Academy in London between 1931 and 1957, and between 1933 and 1971 showed a total of 65 pieces with the Society of Women Artists. She was elected an Associate of the Society of Women Artists in 1949 and became a full member two years later. She was also a Fellow of the Royal Society of British Sculptors.

Examples of her work appeared in the 1986 exhibition Sculpture in Britain Between the Wars, organised by the Fine Art Society, which hosted a joint exhibition of work by her and Borne in 1987.
