= Edith Helena Adie =

British artist

- Born: 27 December 1865; London, England
- Died: 16 May 1947 (aged 81); Tonbridge, England
- Known for: Painting

Edith Helena Adie (1865–1947) was a British painter known for her watercolours.

== Biography ==
Adie was born on 27 December 1865 in the Streatham section of London. She was a student at the South Kensington Art School, the Westminster School of Art and the Slade School of Fine Art. She painted landscapes and garden scenes in Taormina and Bordighera Italy. Adie also traveled to Australia. She exhibited at the New Society of Painters in Water Colours and the Royal Academy of Arts between 1893 and 1912 and also with the Royal Society of British Artists. She was a member of the British Watercolour Society.

Adie died on 16 May 1947 in Tonbridge.

== Gallery ==
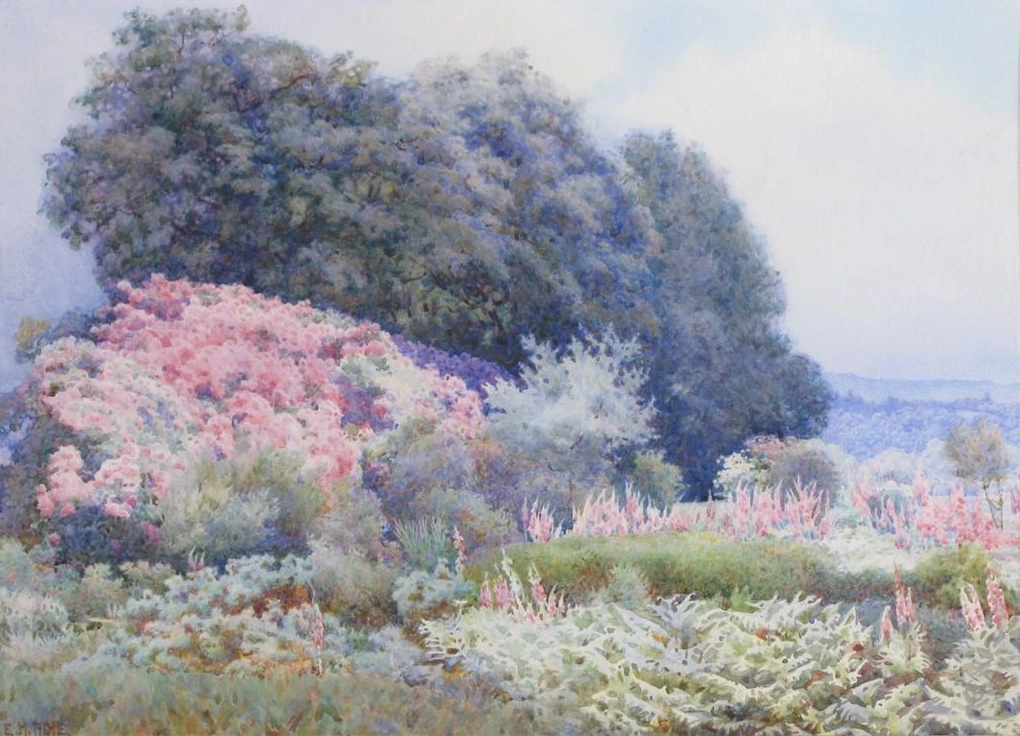
Bank of rhododendrons

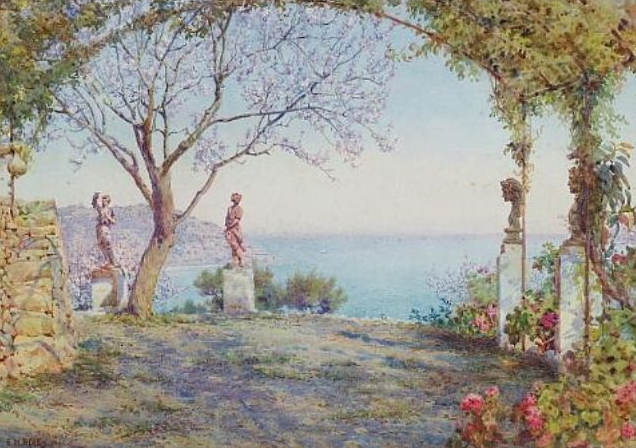
A garden by the Italian lakes

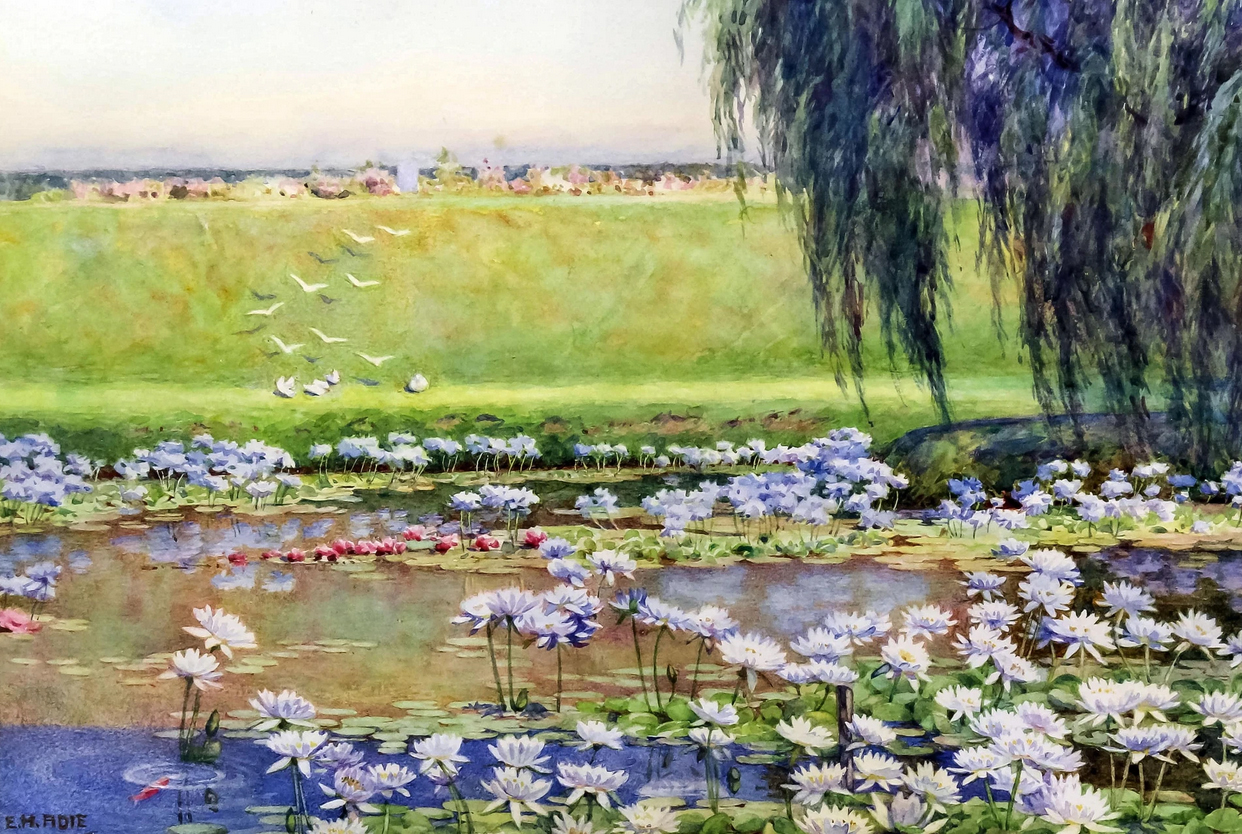
Red and Blue Waterlillies

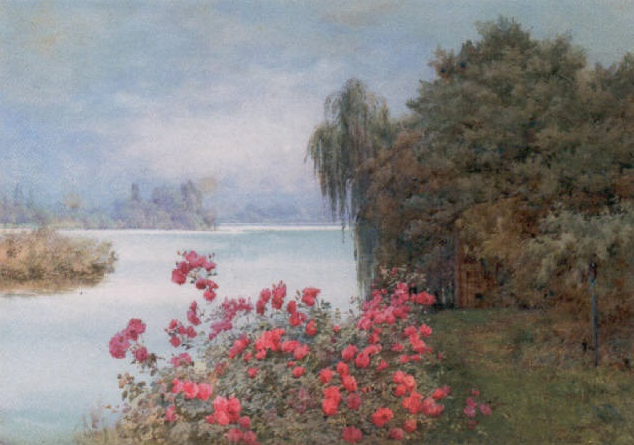
The lake, Hever
