= Winifred Walker =

British artist (1882-1965)

Winifred Ethel Walker (1882–1965) was a British artist known for her botanical illustrations.

== Biography ==
Walker was born at Hampstead in north London, both her parents being school teachers from Bath, Somerset. She attended the Camden School of Art where she won the King's Prize for Modelled Design and gained her Art Masters' Certificate and also spent time studying at Ghent. Walker became a botanical artist, painting in oils and watercolours. From 1929 to 1939 she was an official artist with the Royal Horticultural Society having been elected a Fellow of the Society in 1912 and throughout her career won over thirty medals with the Society. Her flower paintings were awarded a gold medal in Philadelphia and she also received awards at exhibitions in London and Paris. Walker was elected a Fellow of the Linnean Society. From 1943, she was an artist in residence at the University of California.

Walker exhibited works at the Royal Academy, with the Society of Women Artists, the Royal Institute of Painters in Water Colours, the Fine Art Society, at the Paris Salon and at the Chelsea Flower Show. She illustrated a number of botanical and gardening books, including Hardy Perennials (1922) by Albert Macself, The Low Road: hardy heathers and the heather garden (1927) by D Fyfe Maxwell and an edition of The Gardener's Assistant. Walker wrote and illustrated All the Plants of the Bible (1957). Walker spent most of her career in London and died at Bognor Regis in Sussex in 1965.
