= Tony Franks =

Tony Franks (born 1940) is an English ceramic artist. He was born in Birmingham, and studied ceramics at Wolverhampton College of Art from 1962 until 1966. He was previously Head of Ceramics, and is now an emeritus professor and Research Fellow at Edinburgh College of Art. Until 2007 he was the President of the International Academy of Ceramics. In 2008, he is one of the British artists invited to create work on site for the British pavilion at the FLICAM International Ceramic Art Museum, Shaanxi province, China.

== Awards ==
- Poisson d'Or, 4th International Contemporary Porcelain Triennial, Nyon 1995
- Honorary Doctor of Arts, University of Wolverhampton
