= Flora Macdonald Reid =

British painter

- Born: 1860; London, United Kingdom
- Died: 1938 (aged 76–77)
- Known for: Painting

Flora Macdonald Reid (1860 – 1938) was a British, Scottish painter and the sister of the artists John Robertson Reid and Elizabeth Reid.

== Life ==
Reid was born in London in 1860, to Scottish parents, and the family later moved to Edinburgh. She studied at the Trustees School of Art, and was also tutored by her brother John. In 1881 she and her siblings returned to London, where they lived in the Haverstock Hill area of the city. Later in her life she spent a decade in Cornwall, living in Looe and Polperro.

== Work ==
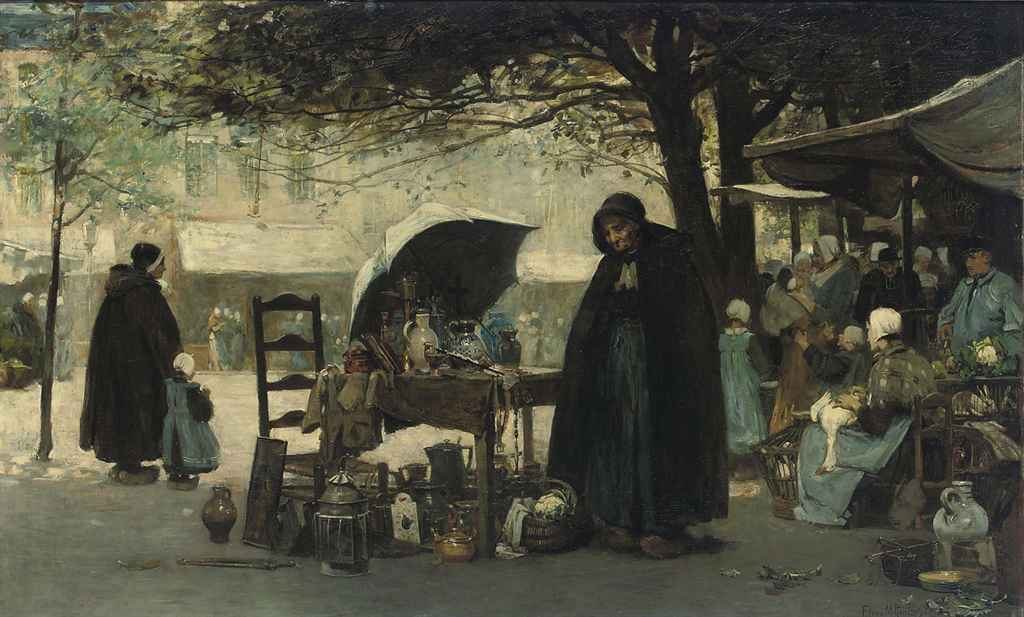
Faith, or A Bruges Market Place, 1893.

At the age of sixteen Reid exhibited work at the Royal Scottish Academy, at the Royal Glasgow Institute of the Fine Arts from the age of 19, and at the Royal Academy from 20. She is recorded as showing paintings at the Royal Academy in 1900 with her paintings The Miller's Frau, A Wonderful Tale and A Man Convinced Against His Will, is of the Same Opinion Still. Her painting Faith (later named A Bruges Market Place) was included in the 1905 book Women Painters of the World.

Reid's painting Fieldworkers, 1883 (Fleming-Wyfold Foundation) was included in the Modern Scottish Women: Painters and Sculptors 1885-1965 exhibition at the Scottish National Gallery of Modern Art in 2016.

== International reputation ==
Reid travelled and lived in Norway, France and Belgium, and was in 1900 awarded a gold medal at the Exposition Universelle (1900) in Paris.

Reid exhibited her work at the Palace of Fine Arts at the 1893 World's Columbian Exposition in Chicago, Illinois.

Between 1895 and 1932 Reid exhibited six times at the Parisian Salon de Société des Artistes Français, frequently at the Royal Scottish Academy between 1877 and 1922, and in almost every year between 1880 and 1938 at the Royal Glasgow Institute of theFine Arts.

== Work in public collections ==
- The Flemish Lacemaker, Dudley Art Gallery, acquired 1894 by public subscription.
- Bruges, National Galleries of Scotland
- Market Scene, Bruges, National Galleries of Scotland
- A Cornish Fishwife, Manchester Art Gallery
