= Fanny Byse =

English artist

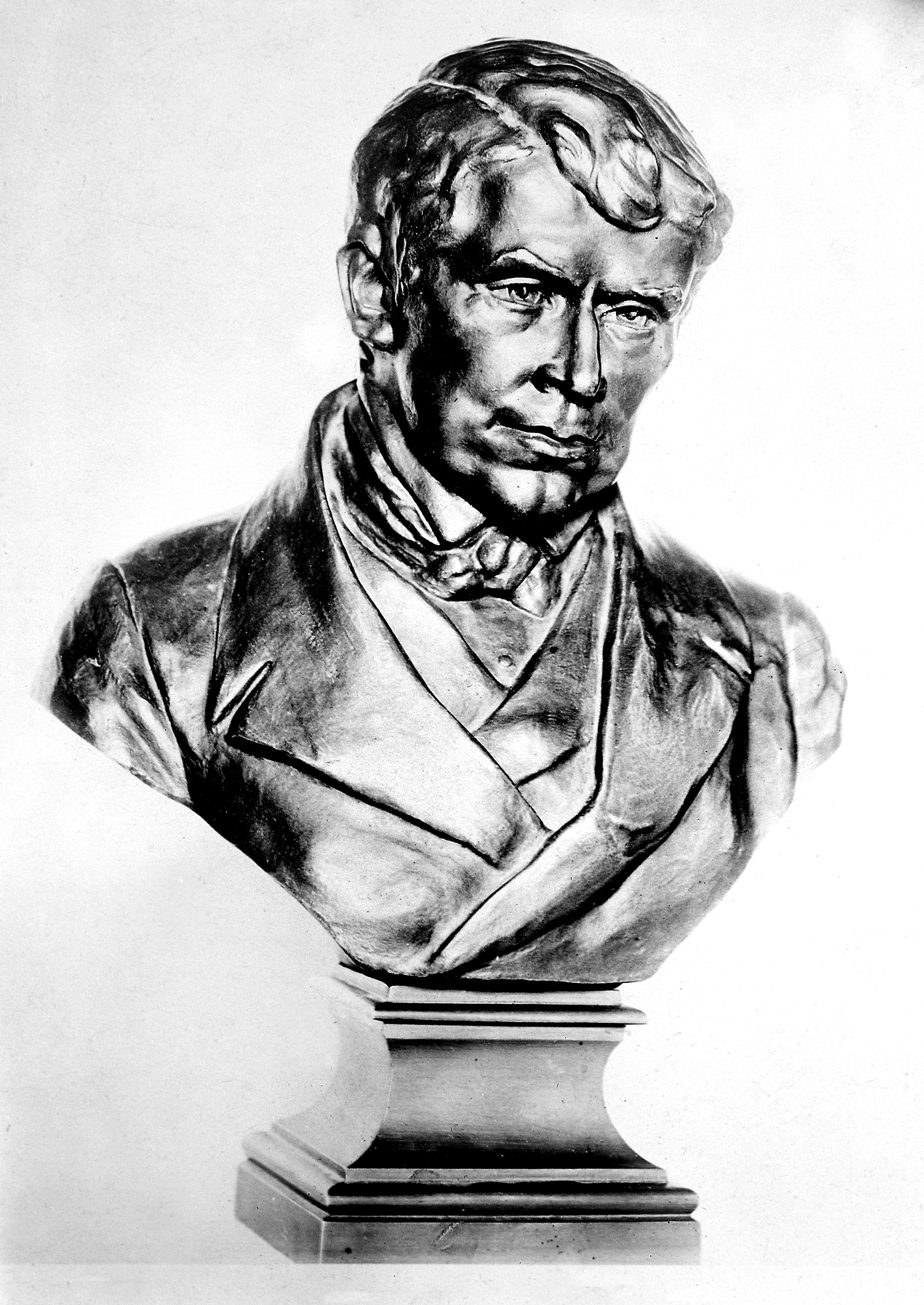
Bronze bust of Alexandre Vinet

Fanny Byse née Lee (born 1849) was a British sculptor who specialised in creating heads and busts.

== Biography ==
Byse was born in London in 1849 but did not begin practising sculpture until 1893 when she went to Geneva where she was taught by Jules Salmson, the director of the School of Industrial Arts there. Subsequently, she studied in Rome, Florence and Paris. Byse produced numerous busts and head figures, which she mainly exhibited in Paris with the Salon des Artistes Francais but also at the Royal Academy in London during 1902. Her bronze bust of Alexandre Vinet is in the Wellcome Collection in London.
