= Beatrice Angle =

British artist (1859–1915)

Beatrice Angle (1859–1915) was a British sculptor who worked in terracotta and bronze.

== Biography ==
Angle was born in Hornsey in north London but grew up in neighbouring Islington, one of the eleven children of Susan and John Angle, a job master. Angle specialised in terracotta and bronze busts and heads, but on occasion also produced porcelian pieces and more imaginative designs. At the Paris Salon of 1892 she showed a statuette entitled The Young Venitian. Angle exhibited pieces at the Walker Art Gallery in Liverpool and in London, showing some 16 works at the Royal Academy between 1885 and 1899 and two pieces at the Society of Women Artists in 1890. For some time Angle maintained a studio at Yeoman's Row in Kensington but later lived at Sandwich in Kent.
