= Enid Peate =

Enid May Meredith Peate, née Cartwright, (1883–1954) was an English artist and craftworker, producing pieces in brass and leather.

== Biography ==
Peate was born in the Willesden area of London, where her father was a chartered accountant. She studied at the Willesden School of Art and at the Oswestry School of Art. Peate qualified as an art teacher and alongside her teaching career created watercolour paintings, embroidery pieces and craft pieces in brass and leather. She exhibited works at the Liverpool Academy of Arts, with the Liver Sketching Club and at the Walker Art Gallery in Liverpool, which holds examples of her work.

In 1915 she married Arthur Peate, a flour miller from Oswestry. The couple had three children and later lived at Portmadoc in Caernarfonshire.
