= Largeworker =

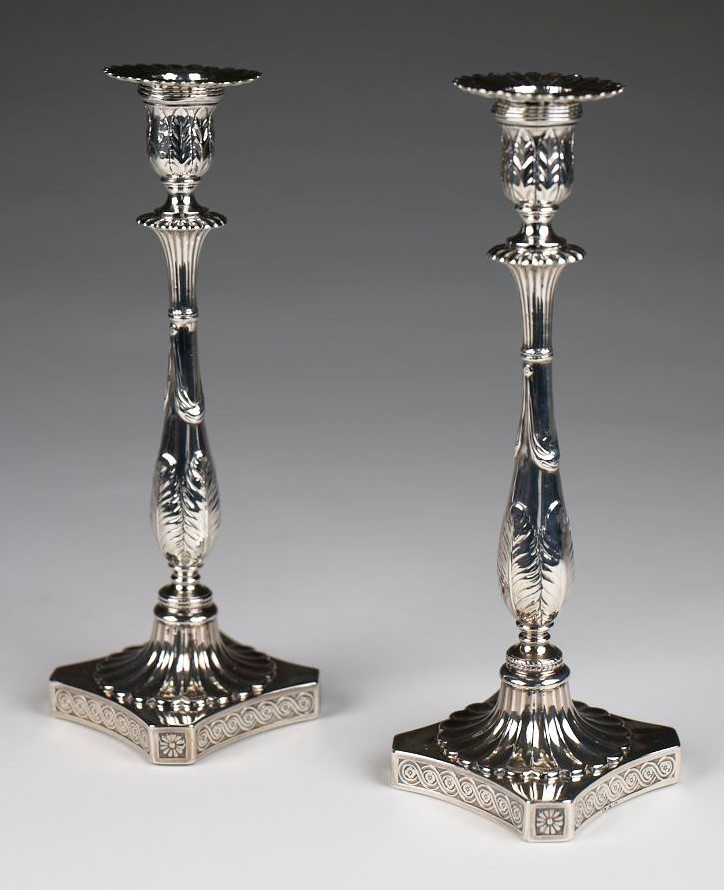
Pair of silver candlesticks made by Matthew Boulton and John Fothergill in Birmingham, England, 1773 or 1774.

A largeworker was a form of silversmith in England from the 17th to the early 20th centuries who made items of a larger size such as dishes or candlesticks. When craftsmen registered their mark they would classify themselves as "goldworker", "smallworker", or "largeworker" according to their skill and specialism.
