= Wilhelmina Barns-Graham =

British abstract artist (1912–2004)

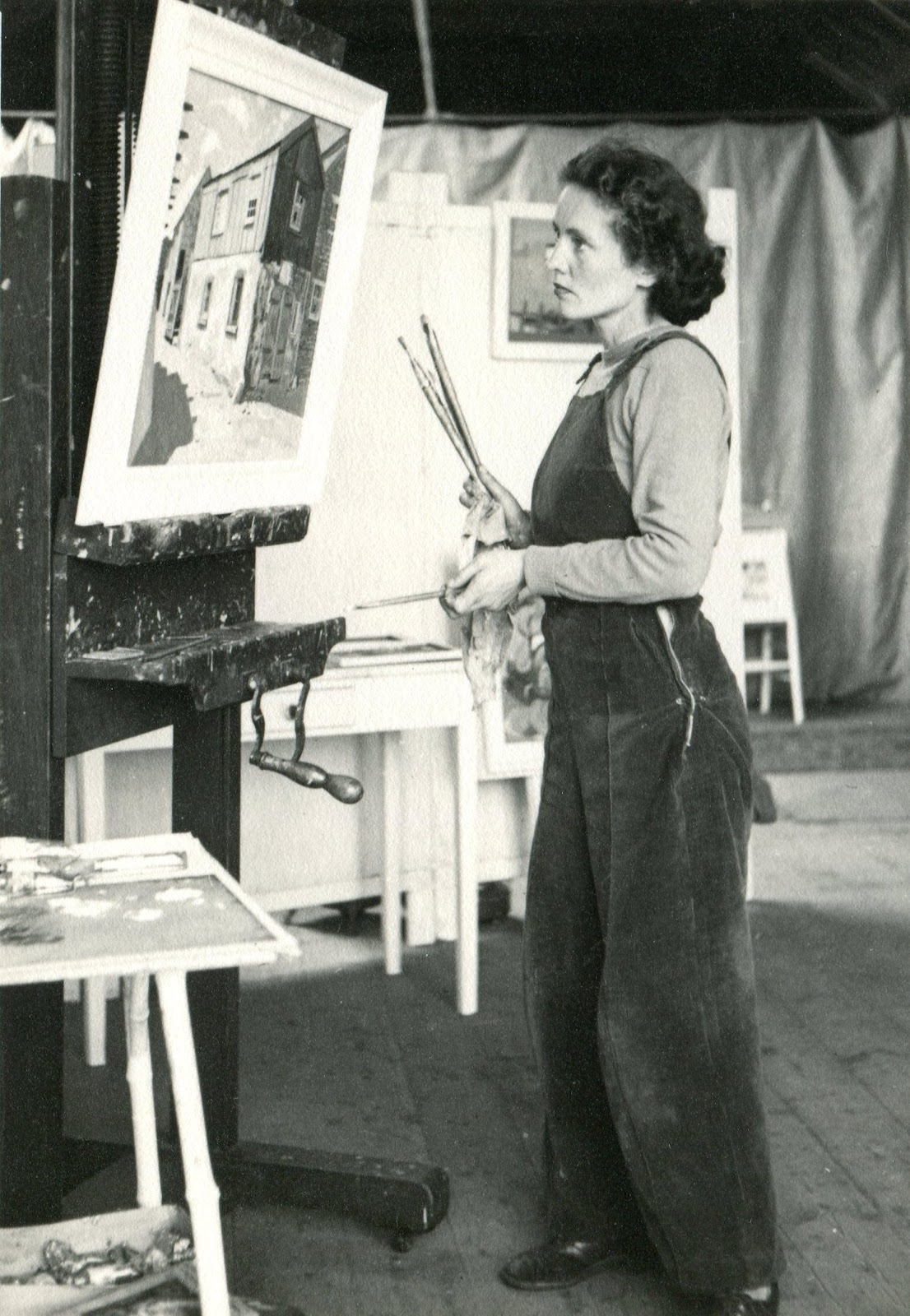
- Barns-Graham at No. 1 Porthmeor Studio, St Ives 1947
- Born: 8 June 1912; St Andrews, Fife, Scotland
- Died: 26 January 2004 (aged 91); St Andrews, Fife, Scotland
- Resting place: Eastern cemetery, St Andrews
- Education: Edinburgh College of Art
- Occupation: Artist

Wilhelmina Barns-Graham CBE (8 June 1912 – 26 January 2004) was one of the foremost British abstract artists, a member of the influential Penwith Society of Arts.

== Early life ==
Wilhelmina Barns-Graham, known as Willie, was born in St Andrews, Fife, on 8 June 1912, daughter of Allan Barns-Graham, head of a Scottish landed gentry family—he owned estates named Lymekilns and Cambuslang in Lanarkshire, Kirkhill in Ayrshire, Fereneze in Renfrewshire, and Carbeth Guthrie in Stirlingshire, Scotland—and his wife Wilhelmina Menzies, daughter of Charles Bayne Meldrum, whose family of minor Scottish gentry owned the estates of Dura and Balmungo, Fifeshire. Barns-Graham's parents were second cousins. As a child she showed very early signs of creative ability. It was at school that Wilhelmina decided that she wanted to be an artist after one of her paintings was chosen to be displayed on the wall there; she stated later in life that "painting chose me, not I it".

== Education ==
After school she set her sights on Edinburgh College of Art where, after some dispute with her father, and six months at the Edinburgh College of Domestic Science, she enrolled in 1931. During her time at College Barns-Graham was taught by tutors including portrait painter David Alison and painter William MacTaggart, her friends there included the influential Scottish painters Robert MacBryde, Robert Colquhoun, Margaret Mellis and William Gear. Since birth Barns-Graham suffered from weakness of the lungs, exacerbated by stress or anxiety, and in 1933 she contracted pleurisy forcing her to take a break from College. Barns-Graham finally graduated with her diploma in 1936.

== Early artistic career ==
Linear Abstract, 1958, Tate Gallery.

After her education Barns-Graham made study trips to Paris, London and St Tropez before moving to St Ives, Cornwall in 1940 at the suggestion of the Edinburgh College of Art's Principal Hubert Wellington. Barns-Graham moved near to where a group of modernist artists had settled, at Carbis Bay, including her College friend, Margaret Mellis, and Mellis's husband Adrian Stokes. This was a pivotal moment in her life. On one of her first evenings there she met the sculptor Barbara Hepworth who made an immediate and lasting impression on her she then went on to meet Borlase Smart, Alfred Wallis and Bernard Leach, as well as the painter Ben Nicholson and the sculptor Naum Gabo. After two weeks in St Ives, Barns-Graham acquired her first studio, directly below the Porthmeor Gallery which was the administrative headquarters of the St Ives Society of Artists. Her paintings at the time were heavily influenced by the Cornish landscapes and the St Ives harbour. During 1940 and 1941 Barns-Graham contributed to the war effort by volunteering in a factory making camouflage nets however using the rough materials gave her dermatitis so she had to give up the work, instead knitting string vests and socks.

In 1942 Barns-Graham became a member of the Newlyn Society of Artists, in which she exhibited with every year, and the St Ives Society of Artists. While establishing herself in St Ives, Barns-Graham also continued to send work back to Scotland for major exhibitions held there such as the Royal Scottish Academy's 117th Exhibition in 1943. The 1940s were an active time for the St Ives Society of Artists who received a number of invitations to send exhibitions and groups of works to galleries in the UK and abroad, Barns-Graham's work was always included in these as the Society's secretary, Borlase Smart, thought highly of her work.

After the war the number of young modern artists joining the St Ives Society of Artists increased, of which Barns-Graham was one; their works were often shown in the darkly lit font area of the New Gallery of the Mariners' Church which gave them the nickname 'The Artists Around the Font'. There was deemed to be hostility from the more traditional artists of the Society so Barns-Graham and the other modern artists decided to exhibit their work separately in the crypt area of the New Gallery, calling themselves the Crypt Group. The use of the crypt as an exhibition space caught on and was used again a number of times to exhibit the work of the young modernist members of the St Ives Society of Artists. Barns-Graham was included in two Crypt Group exhibitions. In the second, during August 1947, with Sven Berlin, John Wells, Peter Lanyon, and Guido Morris. And in the third, in July/ August 1948, with (alongside Berlin, Wells, and Lanyon) Bryan Wynter, Kit Barker, David Haughton, Patrick Heron, and Adrian Ryan.

Barns-Graham's first opportunity to exhibit in London came when her work was included in a group exhibition of six at the Redfern Gallery. This was due to the introduction and support of Patrick Heron who visited Barns-Graham's studio in St Ives and was excited by her work. Barns-Graham would later have her first one-person exhibition in London at Redfern in 1952.

After a few years of tension, Barns-Graham eventually left the St Ives Society of Artists in 1949, becoming one of the founding members of a new breakaway group named Penwith Society of Arts. The first Penwith Society exhibition opened in June 1949 with huge success and 2755 paying visitors coming to see it.

In May 1949 Barns-Graham was invited to accompany the Brotherton family on a trip to the Grindelwald Glacier in Switzerland. This was a pivotal moment in her artistic career, inspiring Barns-Graham to embark on a series of glacier paintings that she would revisit for decades to come.

In the same year she married the young author and aspiring poet, and later noted architect, David Lewis; the marriage was annulled in 1960.

In 1950 Barns-Graham's painting Upper Glacier was purchased by the British Council. This was her largest sale so far, and the following year the work was included in Herbert Read's book Contemporary British Art. Barns-Graham's work was also increasingly being included in London exhibitions such as the Leicester Galleries Artists of Fame and Promise and the inaugural exhibition at the new Institute of Contemporary Arts premises. In 1951 Barns-Graham's work could be seen in international exhibitions such as the Biennale de Peinture de France, where Barns-Graham was one of only eight British artists invited to contribute.

== Later artistic career ==
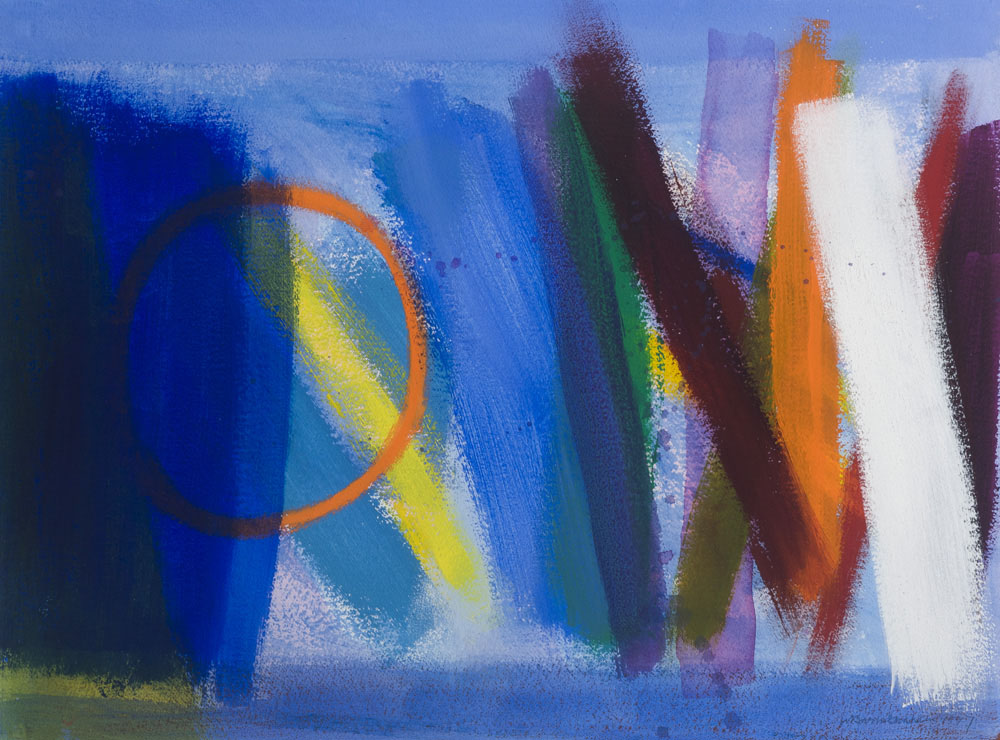
Scorpio Series 3, No.9 1997, in the Wilhelmina Barns-Graham Trust collection

Barns-Graham travelled extensively in the 1950s, often with her husband David Lewis. She visited the Scilly Isles, Paris, Italy and Sicily, and Spain, including the Balearic Islands. With the exception of a short teaching term at Leeds School of Art (1956–1957), where fellow St Ives artist Terry Frost, and future studio-mate Stass Paraskos were studying, and three years in London (1960–1963), she lived and worked in St Ives. From 1960, on inheriting a house outside St Andrews from her aunt Mary Niesh (who had been a support to her throughout her art college years), she split her time between summers in Cornwall and winters in Scotland.

Further travels to the US – on a tour of public and private art collections organised by the Contemporary Art Society – and the Netherlands in the 1960s; and to Orkney, Lanzarote, and Barcelona in the 1980s and 1990s provided rich stimulus for Barns-Graham's artistic practice.

In the second half of the twentieth century, when St Ives had ceased to be a pivotal centre of modernism, Barns-Graham's work and importance as an artist was sidelined, in part by an art-historical consensus that she had been only as a minor member of the St Ives school. In old age, however, she received belated recognition. She received honorary doctorates from the University of St Andrews in 1992 and later from the universities of Plymouth in 2000, Exeter in 2001 and Heriot Watt Universities in 2003. In 1999 she was elected an honorary member of the Royal Scottish Academy and the Royal Scottish Watercolourists. She was awarded a CBE in 2001, the same year that saw the publication of the first major monograph on her life and work, written by Lynne Green — W.Barns-Graham : A Studio Life (Lund Humphries). This publication was followed in 2007 by The Prints of Wilhelmina Barns-Graham: a complete catalogue by Ann Gunn (also a Lund Humphries publication). Her work is found in several major public collections in Britain.

Wilhelmina Barns-Graham died in St Andrews on 26 January 2004. She is buried by the western wall of the Eastern Cemetery, not far from the cathedral. She bequeathed her entire estate to The Barns-Graham Charitable Trust, which she had established in 1987. The aims of the trust are to foster and protect her reputation, to advance the knowledge of her life and work, to create an archive of key works of art and papers, and, in a cause close to her heart, to support and inspire art and art history students through offering grants and bursaries to those in selected art college and universities.

== Legacy ==
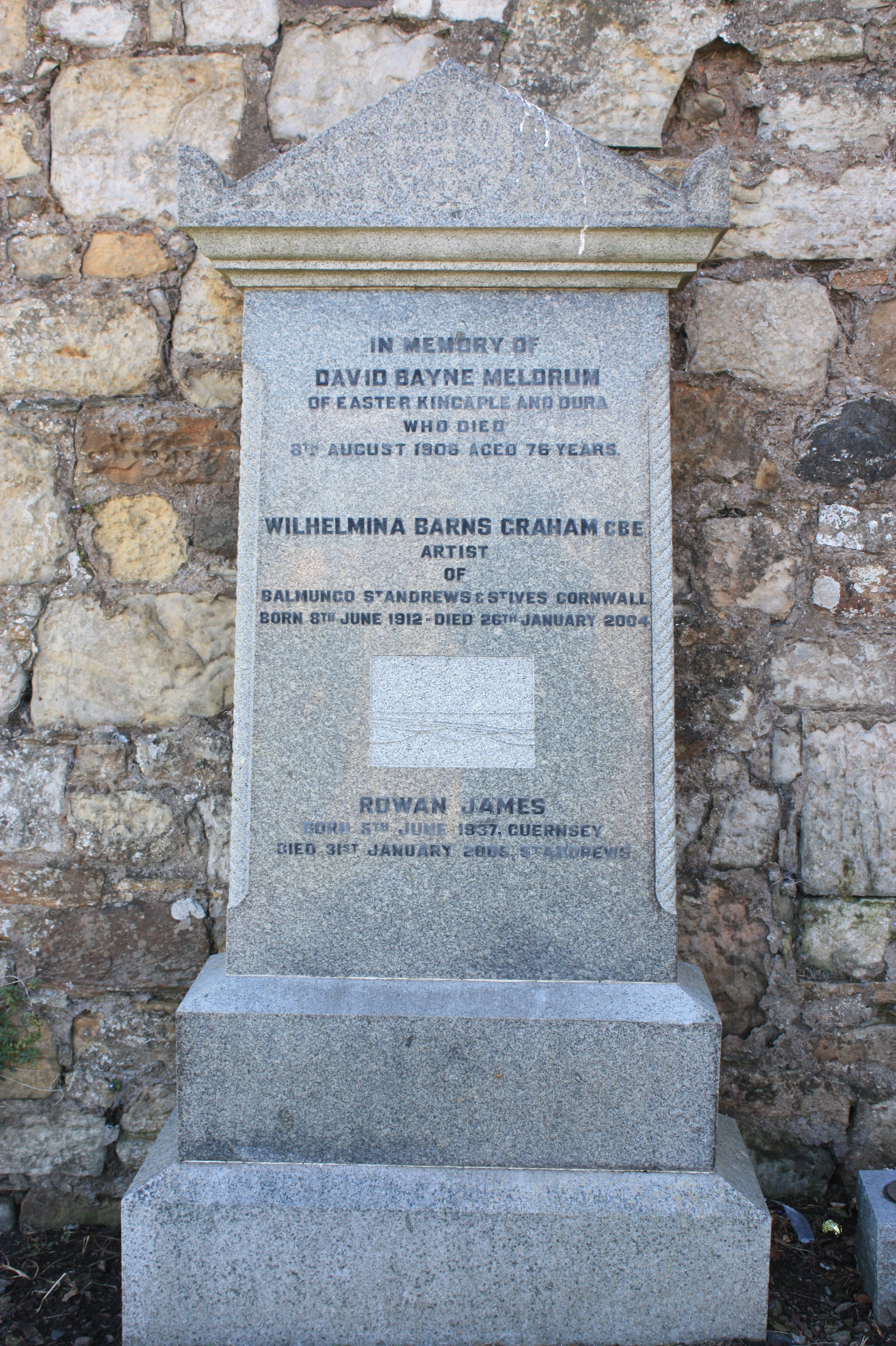
The grave of Wilhelmina Barns-Graham, Eastern Cemetery, St Andrews

There was the solo exhibition Wilhelmina Barns-Graham, 1912–2004: A tribute – Recent Paintings and New Prints, at Art First, London, in 2004.

The Prints of Wilhelmina Barns-Graham: a complete catalogue by Ann Gunn (a Lund Humphries publication) was published in 2007.

In 2024 Barns-Graham was profiled in A Sudden Glimpse to Deeper Things, a documentary film directed by Mark Cousins.

Also in 2024, a plaque was unveiled by the Wilhelmina Barns-Graham Trust at Barns-Graham's birthplace, in St Andrews.

Barns-Graham's name is one of those featured on the sculpture Ribbons, unveiled in 2024.

Barns-Graham's work is now owned by a number of public collections including the Arts Council of Great Britain, Tate Britain, the British Museum and the Victoria and Albert Museum.

== Artistic style ==
Through the course of her life Wilhelmina Barns-Graham's work generally lay on the divide between abstract and representational, typically drawing on inspirations from landscape. From as early as the age of eight Barns-Graham had been creating abstract shapes with coloured chalks. From 1940, when she arrived in Cornwall, her pictures were exploratory and even tentative as she began to develop her own method and visual language. The influence of St Ives then began to take hold as local shapes and colours became apparent – the Cornish rocks, landscape and buildings. Perhaps the most significant innovation at this time derived from the ideas of Naum Gabo, who was interested in the principle of stereometry – defining forms in terms of space rather than mass. Barns-Graham's series of glacier pictures that started in 1949, inspired by her walks on the Grindelwald Glacier in Switzerland, reflect the idea of looking at things in a total view, not only from the outside but from all points, including inside. In 1952 her studies of local forms became more planar and two dimensional. From the mid-1950s Barns-Graham developed a more expressionist and free form attitude following journeys to Spain.

In the early 1960s, reflecting the turmoil in her personal life, Barns-Graham adopted a severe geometrical form of abstraction as a way of taking a fresh approach to her painting. Combined with an intuitive sense of colour and design, the work often has more vitality than is immediately apparent. Squares tumble and circles flow across voids. Colour and movement come together and it is at this point in her work that St Ives perhaps exerts the least influence; rather, this approach more likely reflects an interest in the work of Josef Albers who was exciting UK artists at this time, in embracing new possibilities offered by the optical effects of a more formulaic abstraction.

Nonetheless there is evidence to suggest that many images did stem from observations of the world around her. This is seen in a series of ice paintings in the late 1970s and then in a body of work that explores the hidden energies of sea and wind, composed of multiple wave-like lines drawn in the manner of Paul Klee. The Expanding Form paintings of 1980 are the culmination of many ideas from the previous fifteen years – the poetic movement in these works revealing a more relaxed view.

From the late 1980s until her death, Barns-Graham's paintings became increasingly free; an expression of life and free flowing brushwork not seen since the late 1950s. Working mainly on paper (there are relatively few canvases from this period) the images evolved to become, initially, highly complex, rich in colour and energy, and then, simultaneously, bolder and simpler, reflecting her enjoyment of life and living. "In my paintings I want to express the joy and importance of colour, texture, energy and vibrancy, with an awareness of space and construction. A celebration of life – taking risks so creating the unexpected." (Barns-Graham, October 2001) This outlook is perfectly expressed in the extraordinary collection of screen prints that she made with the Graal Press of Edinburgh, between 1999 and 2003.

== Solo exhibitions ==
- Downing Gallery, St Ives, 1947, 1949 and 1954
- Redfern Gallery, London, 1949/52
- Roland, Browse and Delbanco, London, 1954
- Scottish Gallery, Edinburgh, 1956. 1959, 1960 and 1981
- City Art Gallery, Wakefield, 1957
- Richard Demarco Gallery, Edinburgh and The Bear Lane Gallery, Oxford 1968
- Sheviock Gallery, Cornwall and Park Square Gallery, Leeds, 1970
- Marjorie Parr Gallery, London, 1971
- Wills Lane Gallery, St Ives, 1976
- The New Art Centre, London, 1978
- LYC Museum and Art Gallery, Cumbria, 1981
- The Crawford Centre, St Andrews and Henry Rothschild Exhibition, Germany, 1982
- The Piers Art Centre, Orkney, 1984
- Gillian Jason Gallery, London, 1987
- Ancrum Gallery, Roxburghshire, 1988/1990
- Scottish Gallery, London, 1989
- Retrospective exhibition, touring: Newlyn Art Gallery, Penzance; City Art Gallery, Edinburgh; Perth Museum and Art Gallery; Crawford Art Centre, St Andrews and Maclaurin Art Gallery, Ayr, 1989–1990
- Crawford Art Centre, St Andrews and The Royal Cornwall Museum, Truro, 1992
- W Barns-Graham at 80, William Jackson Gallery, London touring to: Lillie Art Gallery, Milngavie; Abbott Hall Art Gallery, Kendal; Royal Albert Memorial Museum, Exeter; Dundee Art Galleries & Museum, Dundee and Wakefield Art Gallery, Wakefield, 1992–1993
- Drawings 1945–1960, Art First, London; and The Wolf at the Door, Penzance, 1994
- Art First, London, 1995
- The Scottish Gallery, Edinburgh, 1995
- Scottish National Gallery of Modern Art, 1996–1997
- Art First, London; The New Millenium Gallery, St Ives, 1997
- The McGeary Gallery, Brussels and Art First, London, 1999
- Wilhelmina Barns-Graham: An Enduring Image, Tate Gallery, St Ives; W Barns-Graham Prints, Exeter University; Art First, London and Scottish National Gallery of Modern Art, 1999–2000
- Wilhelmina Barns-Graham – Painting as Celebration, Crawford Art Centre, St Andrews; Aberdeen Art Gallery; Royal Cornwall Museum; Graves Art Gallery, Sheffield; City Art Gallery and Museum, York; Peter Scott Gallery, Lancaster University and Ferens Art Gallery, Kingston upon Hull
- W. Barns-Graham: A Celebration at 90, Scottish Gallery, Edinburgh; W. Barns-Graham at 90: A tribute from Art First, Art First, London, 2002
- Wilhelmina Barns-Graham, 1912–2004: A tribute – Recent Paintings and New Prints, Art First, London, 2004
- 'Wilhelmina Barns-Graham, Nature in Motion', Museum Belvédère, The Netherlands, 2026

== See also ==
- List of St. Ives artists
