= Denis Mitchell (sculptor) =

English abstract sculptor

- Born: June 30, 1912; Wealdstone, Middlesex
- Died: March 24, 1993 (aged 80); Newlyn, Cornwall
- Known for: Sculpture
- Website: denismitchell.co.uk

Denis Adeane Mitchell (30 June 1912 – 23 March 1993) was an English abstract sculptor who worked mainly in bronze and wood. A prominent member of the St Ives group of artists, he worked as an assistant to Barbara Hepworth for many years. His work is in the collection of the Tate St Ives, the Art Gallery of New South Wales, the Fitzwilliam Museum, and the Museum of New Zealand Te Papa Tongarewa.

== Early life ==
Mitchell was born in Wealdstone, Middlesex on 30 June 1912. His father was a music hall impresario. In 1913, his parents separated and he moved with his mother and older brother Endell to live with an uncle in Swansea. He grew up in Mumbles and attended the local grammar school.

Mitchell's obituary in The Daily Telegraph said he had "a happy but unremarkable childhood". He left school at 16 and worked in various jobs in Swansea, including at an art studio. During this time, he met Dylan Thomas while drinking in the Mermaid pub and the two became friends.

Mitchell briefly enrolled at Swansea Art College in 1930, leaving after a few months to move to Cornwall. The art evening classes he took there were to be the only formal art training he ever had.

== Move to Cornwall and Second World War ==
In 1930, Mitchell moved to Cornwall with his brother Endell to help renovate his aunt's derelict cottage at Barnoon, St Ives. The pair ended up living there, establishing a market garden and taking odd jobs. Denis became interested in the art scene in St Ives, attending local studio shows and, by the mid-1930s, creating his own paintings.

During the Second World War, Denis worked as a tin miner at Geevor Mine from 1942 to 1945 as an alternative to conscription into the army. He was part of the Home Guard, becoming friends with Bernard Leach and Adrian Stokes, both of whom sparked his interest in modern art.

== Post-war work ==
In 1946, Mitchell joined the St Ives Society of Artists. He continued to work on his market garden as well as being a fisherman from 1946 to 1948. In 1949, Leach mentioned Mitchell's name to Barbara Hepworth who was looking for an assistant; after a trial day, she hired Mitchell. Mitchell would work for Hepworth for a decade, until 1959. During his time working for Hepworth, he began to create sculptures, first with wood and later with bronze.

The same year, Mitchell was involved in the founding of the Penwith Society of Arts. This came after a split in the St Ives Society of Artists between progressive and conservative members which had, according to The West Briton, "been threatening for some years". Denis organised the first meeting of the new society at the Castle Inn, where Endell was landlord. Other founding members included Hepworth, Ben Nicholson, Sven Berlin and Wilhelmina Barns-Graham.

In 1953, Mitchell sold his first sculpture, an elm carving called Mother and Child, to the parents of Angela Flowers while they were visiting Hepworth. He was elected chair of the Penwith Society in 1955, holding the position until 1957. He was known for his calm and diplomatic manner in the role and "did much to harmonise the community and encourage younger artists" according to his Independent obituary.

Mitchell stopped working for Hepworth in 1959. (Note: In a 1992 interview with Iain Gale, Mitchell said he worked for Hepworth for eleven years. However, most other sources say he worked for Hepworth for ten years, from 1949 to 1959.) He later said in a 1992 interview that he stayed with Hepworth for "far too long really, but there was no work down here and there was no other way for me to make money." Mitchell started to sculpt mainly in bronze and took on Breon O'Casey as an assistant. O'Casey would later also become an assistant to Hepworth.

Between 1960 and 1967, Mitchell taught part time at the Redruth School of Art and Penzance Grammar School. He gained greater attention during the 1960s: exhibiting in London, Chicago and New York, receiving an award from the Arts Council in 1966, and becoming a full-time sculptor in 1967 after the success of his first London show at the Marjorie Parr Galleries. Needing more space than his studio on Fore Street allowed, Mitchell joined John Wells in moving to a new larger studio in Newlyn at the end of the 1960s. (Note: The Guardian and Sotheby's suggest that the move to Newlyn was in 1967, but articles in The Independent and The Daily Telegraph say the two artists moved in 1969.) He received commissions from the Foreign Office and the British Council, including a 1968 commission for bronze sculpture for the University of the Andes in Bogotá, Colombia. From 1973 to 1979, the British Council toured an exhibition including his sculptures in the Middle East and Far East. Mitchell also helped to set up the Newlyn Orion Gallery in the 1970s.

After several mixed shows since 1956 and a major solo exhibition in 1977, Mitchell's first retrospective was held at the Glynn Vivian Art Gallery, Swansea in 1979. He was particularly pleased with the exhibition and envisaged it as his final show.

== Personal life ==
Mitchell married Jane Stevens in 1939 and the couple had three daughters, the first being born in 1940.

== See also ==
- List of St Ives artists
