= St Ives School =

Artistry group in the United Kingdom

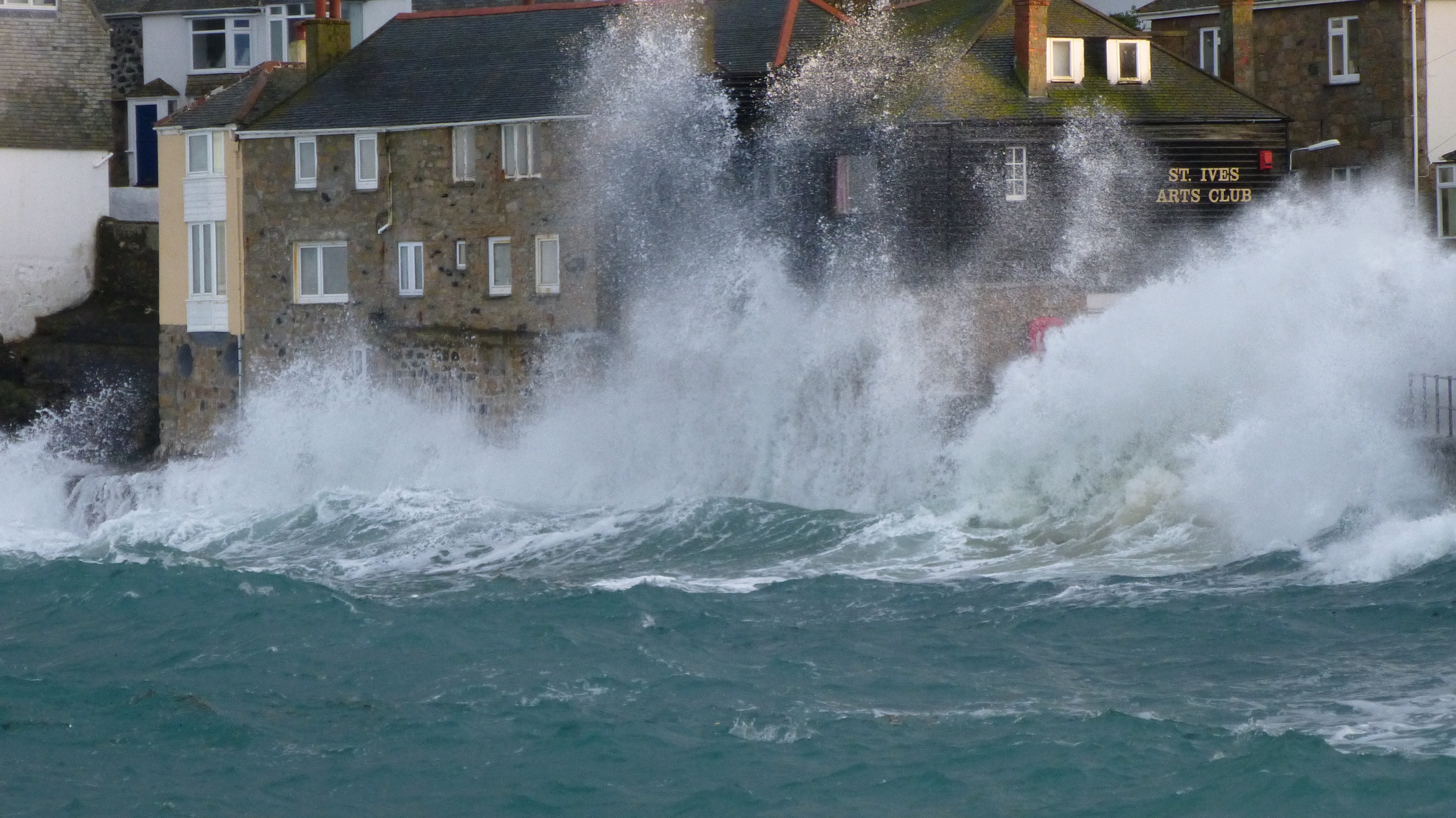
Waves breaking against the St. Ives Arts Club, 2013

The St Ives School refers to a group of artists living and working in the Cornish town of St Ives. The term is often used to refer to the 20th century groups that sprang up after the First World War around such artists as Borlase Smart; however, there was considerable artistic activity there from the late 19th century onwards.

== History ==
The town became a magnet for artists following the extension to west Cornwall of the Great Western Railway in 1877. Painter James McNeill Whistler and his pupils, Walter Sickert and Mortimer Mempes, arrived in 1884, and spent the winter in the town. The Sloop Inn in St Ives, located on the wharf, was the favourite haunt of Victorian artists including Louis Grier. Many of his paintings hung there in earlier years.

Albert Julius Olsson and Louis Grier opened the town's first art school in 1888, and were later joined by Algernon Talmage. Talmage lived and worked in his studio (then called 'The Cabin', located on Westcotts Quay, St Ives). John Noble Barlow settled in St Ives in 1892, although later, he had a studio in the Lamorna Valley, Cornwall. Thomas Millie Dow moved with his family to St Ives in 1894, where Dow joined his friends and fellow painters Louis Grier and Lowell Dyer as members of the St Ives Art Club.

=== Expatriate artists ===
American Impressionist painters Edward Emerson Simmons and Howard Russell Butler came to St Ives in 1886, and founded a studio at Porthmeor. Butler stayed for two summers, but Simmons and his wife, artist Vesta Simmons, lived and painted in the area until 1891. Swedish artist Anders Zorn painted in St Ives, 1887–88, and his Fish Market, St Ives won a gold medal at the 1889 Paris Salon. American painters Sydney Laurence and Alexandrina Dupre honeymooned in St Ives in Summer 1889, and their stay in the fishing village and art colony eventually extended for nearly fifteen years. Canadian painter Emily Carr came to St Ives in 1899, and studied under Olsson and Talmage. Australian painter Hayley Lever first came to St Ives in 1900, married a local woman, Aida Gale, in 1905, and painted there until their 1914 emigration to the United States, while another Australian E. Phillips Fox met his wife-to-be, artist Ethel Carrick, there in 1903. American painter Walter Elmer Schofield and his wife made St Ives their residence from 1903 to 1907, lived in Perranporth after World War I, and retired to Breage in 1937. Schofield recommended the area to fellow American painters George Oberteuffer, Frank Shill and Frederick Judd Waugh. American artist Paul Dougherty lived six months of the year in St. Ives from 1908-1913 following the death of his wife, developing the maritime style for which he would become most famous.

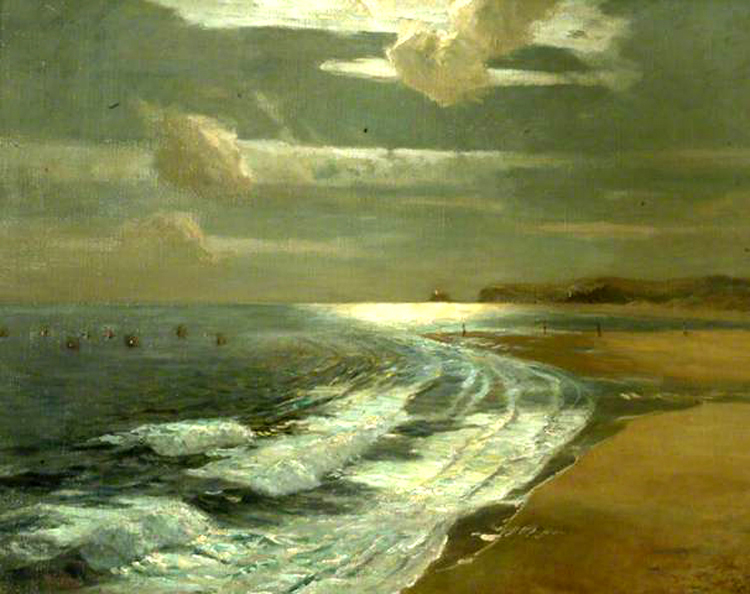
Julius Olsson, Silver Moonlight, St Ives Bay, Southampton City Art Gallery, UK

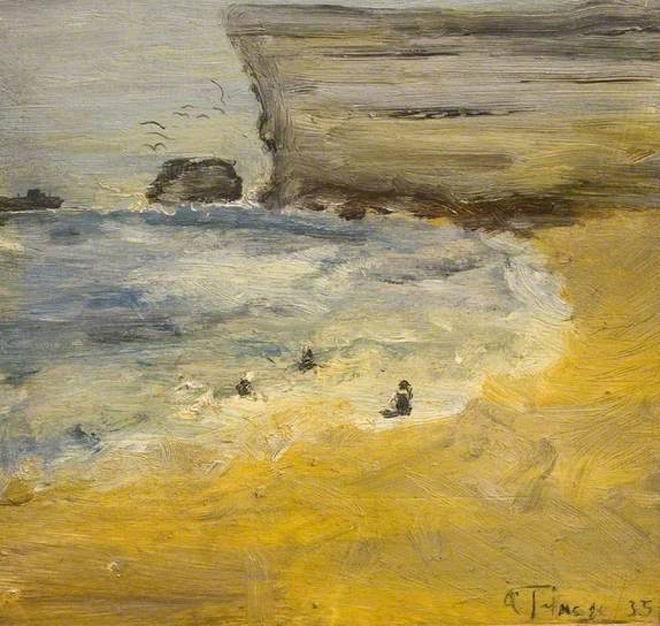
Algernon Talmage, Marine, Bushey Museum, Hertfordshire, UK

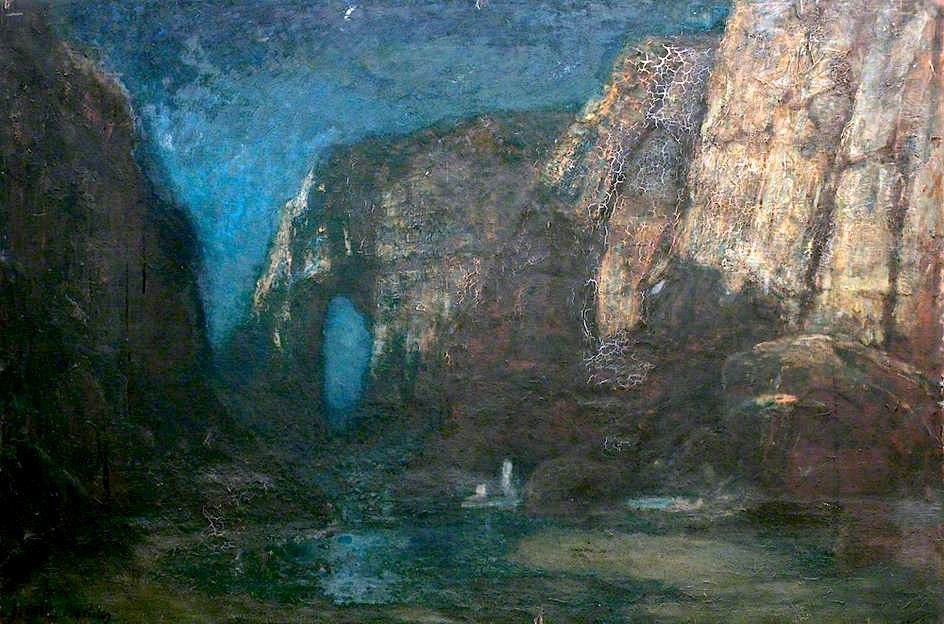
John Noble Barlow, Cliff Scene, Royal Cornwall Museum, Truro, UK

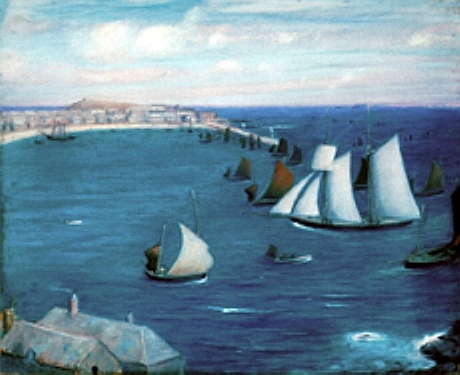
Thomas Millie Dow, St Ives Harbour

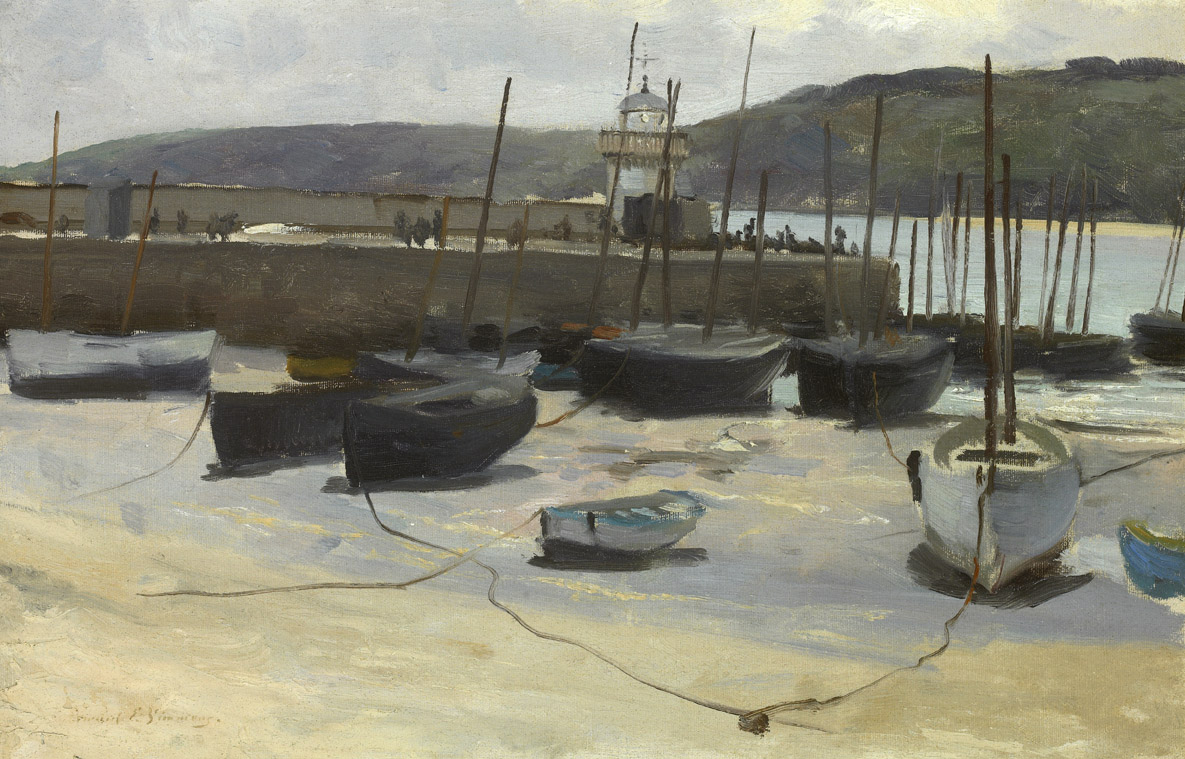
Edward Simmons, Low Tide, St Ives Harbor, private collection

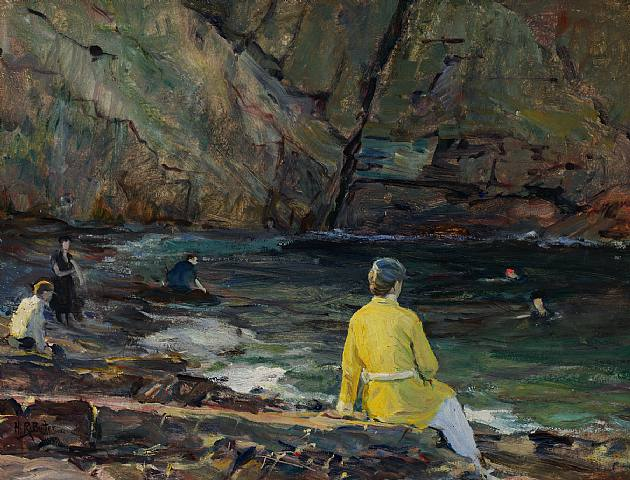
Howard Russell Baker, Yellow Sweater, private collection

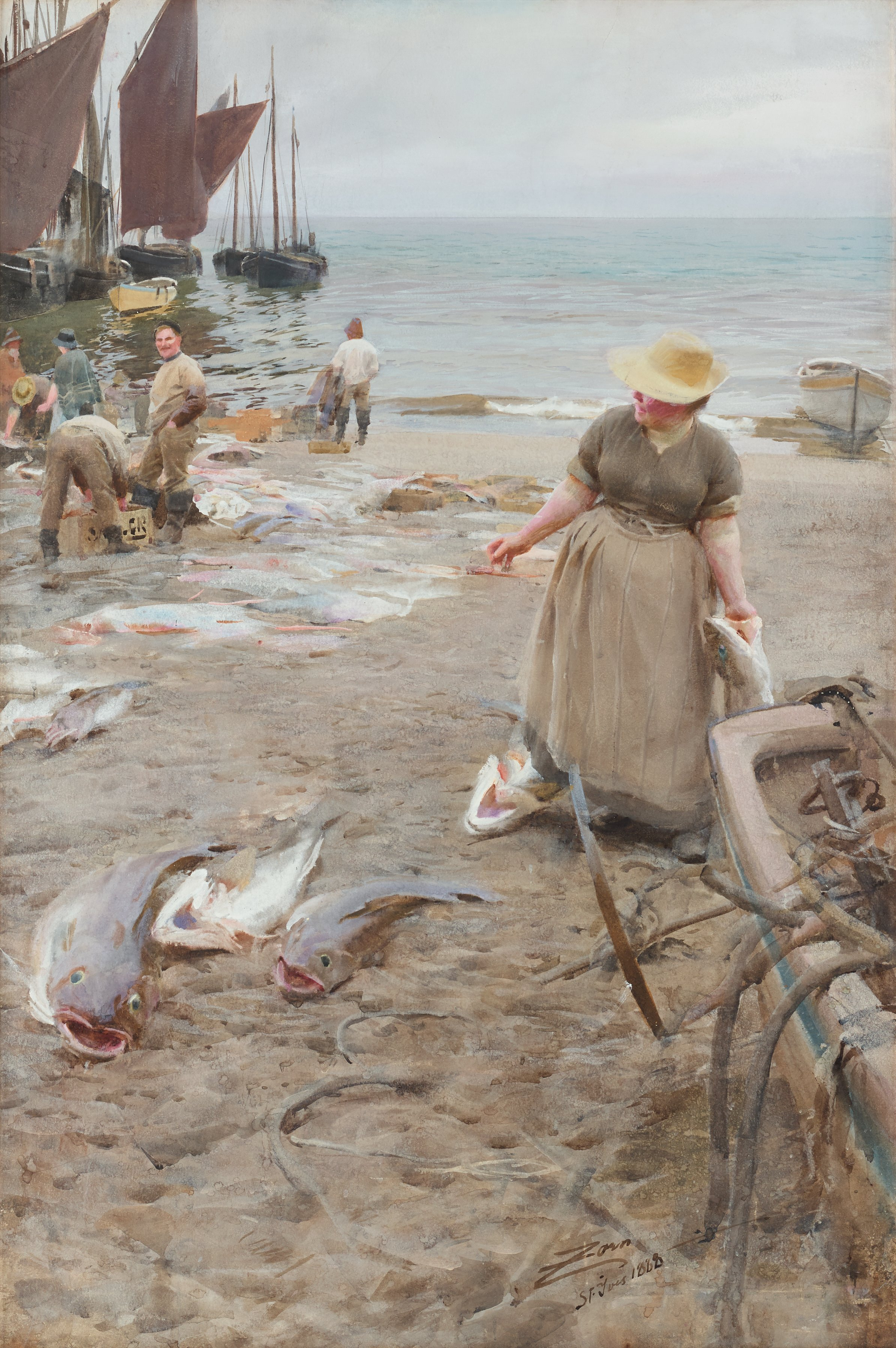
Anders Zorn, Fish Market, St Ives, private collection

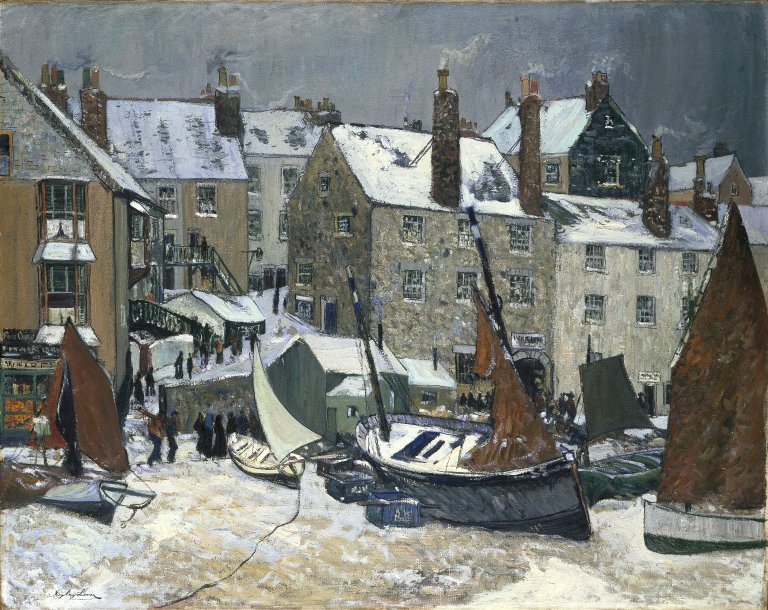
Hayley Lever, Winter in St Ives, Brooklyn Museum, New York City

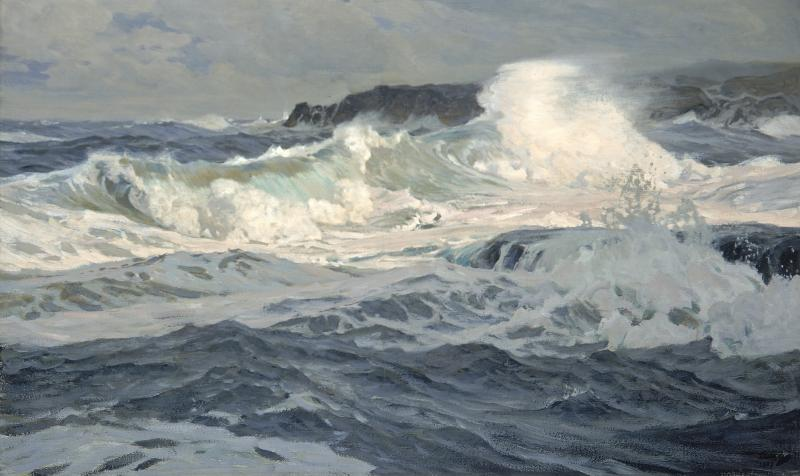
Frederick Judd Waugh, Southwesterly Gale, St Ives, Smithsonian American Art Museum, Washington, D.C.

== Post-WWI ==
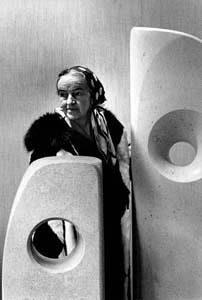
Dame Barbara Hepworth, in 1966

In 1920, Bernard Leach and Shoji Hamada set up a pottery in St Ives, creating a further international art connection for the town.

In 1928, Ben Nicholson and Christopher Wood visited St Ives where they were impressed by the work of local artist Alfred Wallis. This started another strand in the development of the Cornish fishing port as an artists' colony.

The St Ives School of Painting was established in the historic Porthmeor studios at the centre of St Ives' artists' quarter in 1938 by Borlase Smart and Leonard Fuller.

With the outbreak of the Second World War in 1939, Ben Nicholson and his then wife the sculptor Barbara Hepworth settled in St Ives, establishing an outpost for the abstract avant-garde movement in west Cornwall. They were soon joined by the prominent Russian Constructivist sculptor Naum Gabo.

After the war ended, a new and younger generation of artists emerged, led by Hepworth and Nicholson (Gabo departed in 1946). From about 1950 a group of younger artists gathered in St Ives who included Peter Lanyon, John Wells, Roger Hilton, Rose Hilton, Bryan Wynter, Patrick Heron, Terry Frost, Alexander Mackenzie, Harry Ousey, Wilhelmina Barns-Graham, Tony O'Malley, Jane O'Malley (née Harris), Stass Paraskos, Paul Feiler, and Karl Weschke together with the pioneer modern potter, Bernard Leach (Nicholson departed in 1958), and including, for a while, Sven Berlin. It is with this group, together with Hepworth and Nicholson, that the term 'St Ives School' is particularly associated.

A 2010 ninety-minute BBC 4 film, The Art of Cornwall, presented by James Fox explored in some detail the lives and works of many of the key figures and the contributions they made in establishing St Ives as a major centre of British art from the 1920s onwards. Helen Hoyle's review of this programme is also very informative.

== St Ives School today ==
The heyday of the St Ives School was in the 1950s and 1960s. In 1993, the Tate St Ives, a new, purpose-built art gallery overlooking Porthmeor Beach, was opened; it exhibits the Tate collection of St Ives School art.

== See also ==
- List of St Ives artists
- Barbara Hepworth Museum
- The Nine British Art
- Marlow Moss
- Penwith Society of Arts
