= Penwith Society of Arts =

Art group in Cornwall, England

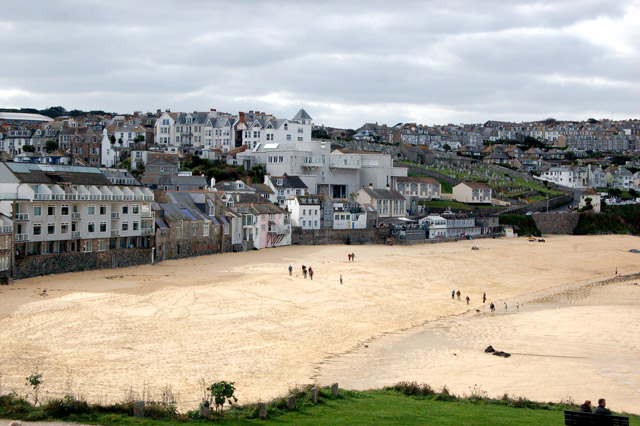
Fishing lofts on Porthmeor Beach

The Penwith Society of Arts is an art group formed in St Ives, Cornwall, England, UK, on 8 February 1949 by abstract artists who broke away from the more conservative St Ives School. It was originally led by Barbara Hepworth and Ben Nicholson, and included members of the Crypt Group of the St Ives Society, including Peter Lanyon and Sven Berlin. Other early members included: Leonard Fuller, Isobel Heath, Alexander Mackenzie, John Wells, Bryan Wynter, Wilhelmina Barns-Graham, David Haughton, Denis Mitchell, and the printer Guido Morris. Herbert Read was invited to be the first president.

Then on 8 February 1949, after a town meeting at the Castle Inn, a dissident group set up shop in Fore Street, St Ives. In 1960 an old pilchard factory was taken over with converted studios above. The Society’s home is the Penwith Gallery on Back Road West, a former pilchard-packing factory that now contains three public galleries and artists’ studios. After ten years of sincere guidance and deep interest, funds were raised by Barbara Hepworth with the aim of converting adjacent buildings into studios for craft and sculpture as well as painting; these expanded the project still further at Back Road West. In 1967 Kathleen Watkins was appointed curator and secretary (1967-2013) of the society, advising, among other things, clients on potential purchases.

== Members ==
The original founder members were:

- Shearer Armstrong
- Wilhelmina Barns-Graham
- Sven Berlin
- David Cox
- Agnes E Drey
- Leonard John Fuller
- Isobel Heath
- Barbara Hepworth
- Marion Grace Hocken
- Peter Lanyon
- Bernard Leach
- Denis Mitchell
- Guido Morris
- Marjorie Mostyn
- Dicon Nance
- Robin Nance
- Ben Nicholson
- Hyman Segal
- John Wells

As of 2025, the current full members are:

- Jenny Beavan
- Noel Betowski
- Clive Blackmore
- Colin Caffell
- Lar Cann
- Margrit Clegg
- Stephen Clutterbuck
- Jessica Cooper
- Mary Crockett
- Sue Davis
- Paula Downing
- Jill Eisele
- Christine Feiler
- Sophie Fraser
- Anthony Frost
- Aidan Hicks
- Richard Holliday
- Carol Hosking-Smith
- Paul Jackson
- Robert Jones
- Rachael Kantaris
- Mary Kaun English
- David Kemp
- Tom Leaper
- Jason Lilley
- Karen McEndoo
- David Moore
- John Piper
- Jeff Powell
- Michael Praed
- Debbie Prosser
- Lieke Ritman
- Stephanie Sandercock
- Jennifer Semmens
- Michael Sheppard
- Sutton Taylor
- Mark Verry
- Rod Walker
- Glyn Walton
- Tamsyn Williams
- Jenny Woodhouse
- Peter Wray & July Collins
- Jane Yates

Honorary Members:

- Peter Hayes
- Tommy Rowe
- Philip Wakeham
