= Isobel Heath =

British artist and poet (1908-1989)

Isobel Atterbury Heath
- Born: 29 December 1908; Kingston Upon Hull, England
- Died: 1989 (aged 80–81)
- Known for: Painting, Poetry
- Spouse: Marc Prati

Isobel Atterbury Heath (29 December 1908 – 1989) was a British artist and poet active in the St Ives area of Cornwall.

== Biography ==
Heath was born in Kingston Upon Hull. Little is known of her childhood but later in life she indicated that her father had been a chemist and that she had been educated by nuns. Heath studied at the Académie Colarossi in Paris before, in the late 1930s, taking classes at the school of painting run by Leonard Fuller in St Ives. During World War II Heath worked as an illustrator for the Ministry of Information, painting and drawing workers in ordinance factories and at a camouflage factory in St Ives. During the war, she also made pencil drawings of British and American troops stationed in Cornwall. She was given permission to record naval subjects and also spent time at the Spitfire station at RAF Perranporth. During the conflict she met her future husband, Dr. Marc Prati, a political correspondent for La Stampa, who as an Italian national had been interned in Cornwall.

Heath was a member of the St Ives Society of Artists and in 1949 was a founder member of the breakaway Penwith Society of Arts but resigned in 1950 and rejoined the St Ives Society in 1957. She continued to exhibit with the St Ives Society for the rest of her life. The Cornish landscape was the principal subject of Heath's paintings and she would regularly camp out on the moors in Cornwall for several days at a time painting landscapes. In 1962, for the Royal Watercolour Society she organized an exhibition of unknown Cornish artists, entitled The Cornish Experiment. Heath exhibited with the Royal Institute of Oil Painters, Royal Institute of Painters in Water Colours and the Royal Scottish Academy. She was included in the centenary exhibition of the Society of Women Artists held in London during 1955. Heath also published three volumes of poetry.

== Published works ==
- Passing Thoughts, 1971
- Love, 1973
- Reflections, 1978
