= William Gear =

Scottish painter (1915–1997)

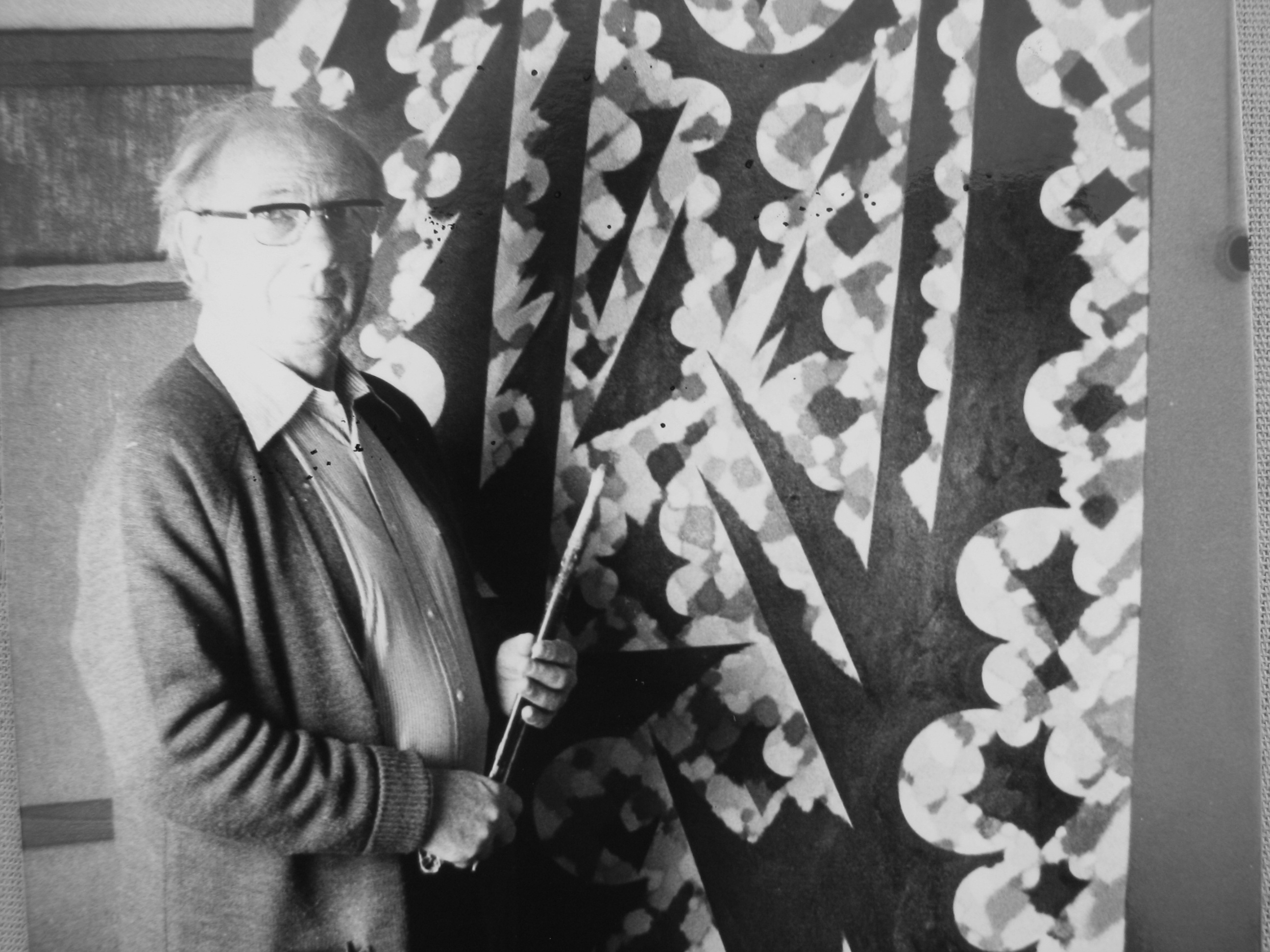
- Gear in his Edgbaston studio, August 1979
- Born: 2 August 1915; Methil, Fife, Scotland
- Died: 27 February 1997 (aged 81); Birmingham, England
- Known for: Abstract painting

William Gear RA RBSA (2 August 1915 – 27 February 1997) was a Scottish painter and printmaker, notable for his abstract compositions. He was also a teacher, museum curator and in World War II an army officer.

== Early life ==
Gear was born in Methil in south-east Fife, Scotland, the son of Janet (1886–1955) and Porteous Gear (1881–1965), a coal miner. He attended Buckhaven High School where he won the Dux Arts Medal (1932). From 1932 to 1936 he studied at Edinburgh College of Art where fellow students included Wilhelmina Barns-Graham and Margaret Mellis.

== Career ==
=== Early years & military service ===
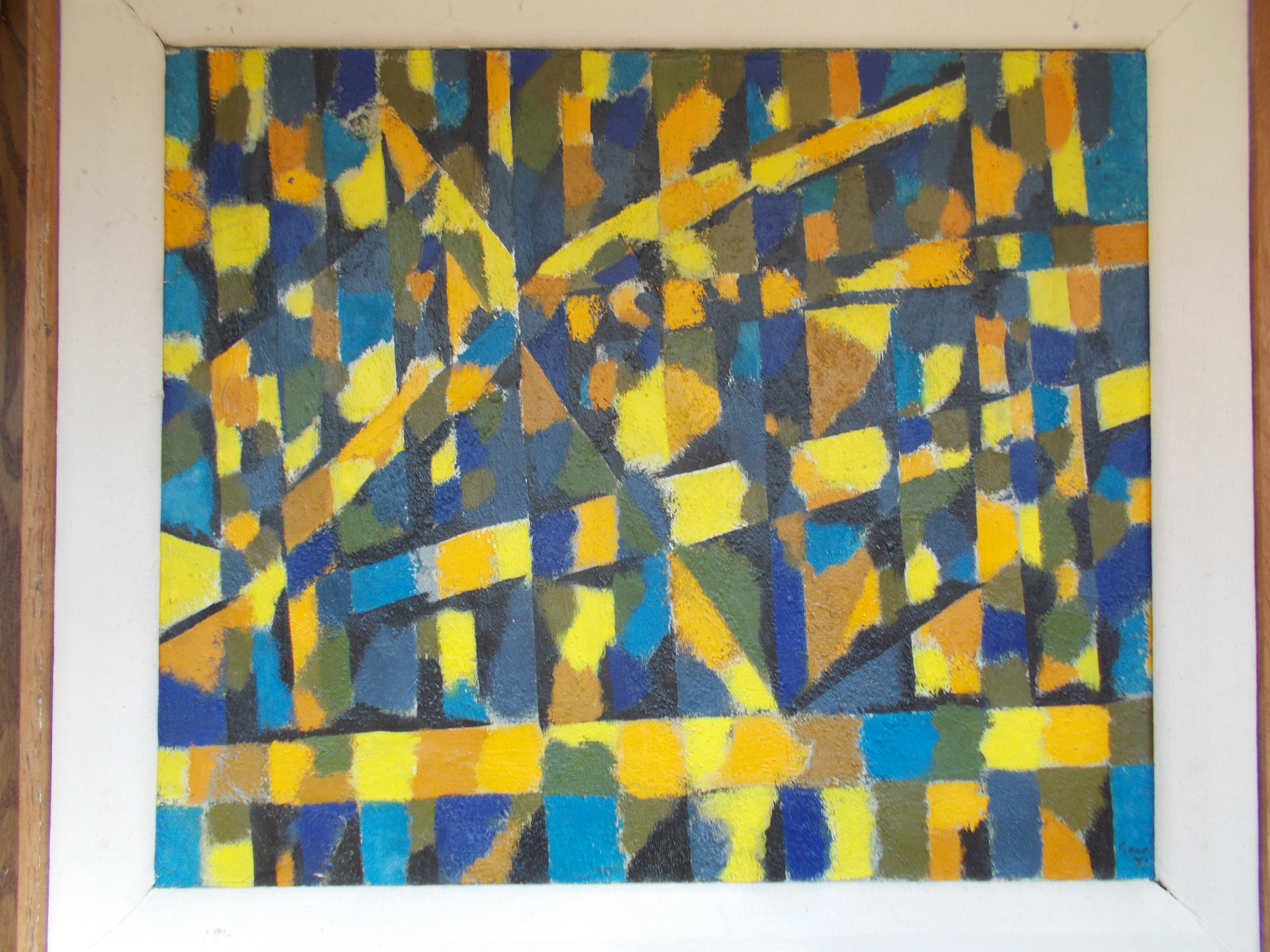
'Landscape' Sep 1951, oil on canvas

He first exhibited in 1934 with the Royal Scottish Academy and Society of Scottish Artists, and his postgraduate scholarship (1936–37) included history of art studies with Professor David Talbot Rice at the University of Edinburgh.

Awarded a travelling scholarship (1937–38), Gear visited France, Italy, Yugoslavia, Albania, Greece and Turkey. This trip included a stay in Paris studying with Fernand Léger. At summer school in Arbroath (1938) he met Robert Colquhoun and Robert MacBryde. A brief interest in Surrealism led him to exhibit with the New Era Group in Edinburgh in 1939.

Called up for military service in 1940, and commissioned 2nd Lieutenant in 1941, during World War II Gear served with the Royal Corps of Signals. He met Merlyn Evans in Durban, en route to his first posting in the Middle East. Gear subsequently served in Egypt, Palestine, Syria and Cyprus, before participating in the Allied invasion of Italy, where in Siena and Florence he held his first solo exhibitions in 1944. After VE Day he worked for the Monuments, Fine Arts and Archives section (MFAA) of the Allied Control Commission, with responsibility for securing art works in Lower Saxony in the British Zone of occupied postwar Germany. During his travels through Europe he also worked to promote local artists suffering from wartime deprivations, including Karl Otto Götz.

=== Paris, CoBrA and influences ===
Between 1947 and 1950 Gear lived and worked in Paris, where he met Eduardo Paolozzi, Alan Davie, Stephen Gilbert and many of the leading post-war generation of Parisian artists including Atlan, Da Silva, De Staël, Dubuffet, Hartung, Mathieu, Pignon, Poliakoff, Schoffer, Singier, Soulages and Zadkine. In 1948 he held his first solo exhibitions in Paris and at Gimpel Fis in London and visited Terry Frost, Patrick Heron, Roger Hilton, Peter Lanyon and Bryan Winter in St Ives. After meeting Appel, Constant, Corneille, and Jorn, he joined and exhibited with the North European avant-garde CoBrA art group in Amsterdam during 1949. That year he also co-exhibited with Jackson Pollock in New York, married an American citizen, Charlotte Chertok (1920–88), and his son David was born. While holidaying in Brittany in 1950, he was visited by William Scott.

=== 1950s & the avant-garde ===
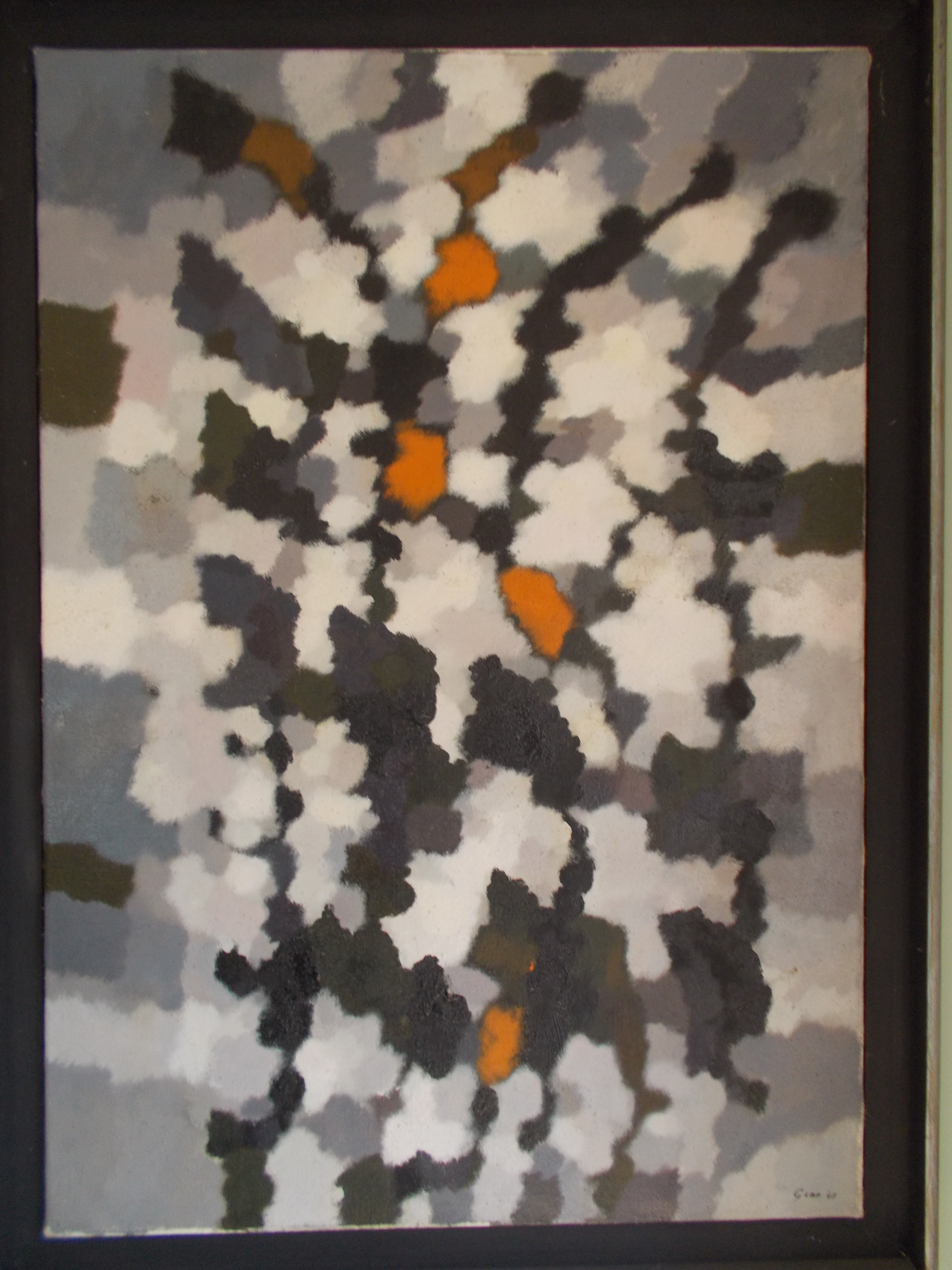
'Landscape with Orange' May 1961, oil on canvas

In 1950 William Gear moved with his family to England (Loosley Row, Buckinghamshire), and in response to an Arts Council invitation to produce a work for its "Sixty Paintings for '51" exhibition, he painted "Autumn Landscape", now in the Laing Art Gallery, Newcastle. When the work was awarded a Festival of Britain purchase prize in 1951, the result was a public furore. Following a further move to the nearby Speen Farm (Flowers Bottom, Buckinghamshire), his son Robert was born the same year.

In 1952, Gear produced the notable works, 'Early Spring' and 'March Landscape', both paintings similar in style, with abstract organic shapes in vibrant blues and greens. 'Early Spring' remained in the collection of Gear and remained with his Estate after he died.

'March Landscape' went directly to The Bishop Suter Art Gallery in New Zealand, purchased by Lady Mabel Annesley while on a trip to England. The Suter Trust Board questioned 'March Landscape' and Lady Annesley resigned as a gallery trustee in protest at its reaction. When 'March Landscape' went on display for the first time at The Suter, a public debate about the merits of abstract art erupted in the 'Nelson Evening Mail' in December 1952, so much so that this was reported in England. This served to confirm Gear's reputation as being one of the most avant-garde painters of his day. The painting was renamed 'Spring Landscape' by the Suter Trustees and was influential on New Zealand artists; possibly inspiring Colin McCahon (such as his 'Titirangi Kauri' paintings from 1953) and most certainly Irvine Major, whose 1967 exhibition 'Nelson in Abstract Form' owed much to this work.

=== Awards, posts & fellowships ===
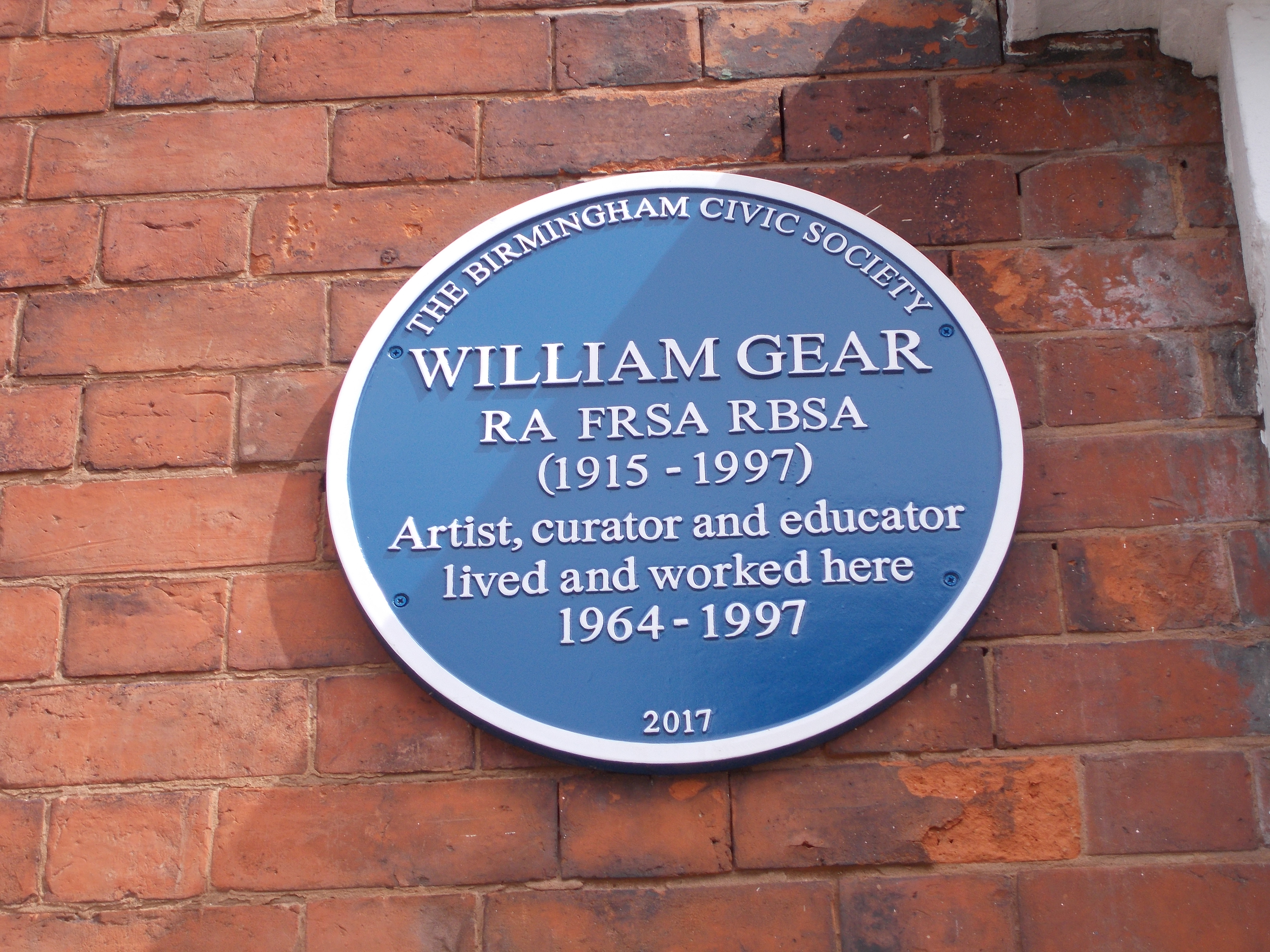
The blue plaque at Gear's house, Edgbaston, Birmingham

Gear was amongst the pioneers in Britain to produce prints using the silk screen technique. He moved to Littlebourne in Kent (1953), was elected a member of The London Group, and began receiving commissions for fabric and wallpaper designs, producing about 100 over the following nine years. He was curator of the Towner Gallery in Eastbourne from 1958 to 1964, and then head of the Faculty of Fine Art at Birmingham College of Art, a post from which he retired in 1975. He became a member of the Royal Birmingham Society of Artists in 1966, and was Guest Lecturer at the National Gallery of Victoria, Melbourne, and the University of Western Australia, Perth (1966/67).

In 1967 Gear received the David Cargill Award from the Glasgow Institute of Fine Arts, was appointed to the Fine Art Panel of the National Council for Diplomas in Art and Design in 1968, elected FRSA in 1971, and awarded the Lorne Fellowship in 1975. The same year he retired from his Fine Art post, which by then was encompassed within Birmingham Polytechnic.

=== Late works and exhibitions ===
A touring exhibition (Paris, Chalon, and Rennes) of CoBrA artists' work during 1982/83 heralded a revival of interest in the movement (1948–51). Over the next decade he participated in group CoBrA exhibitions in several countries, and also held solo shows of his CoBrA period works in London (1987 and 1989) and Paris (1988). In 1994 he was awarded the Royal Academy's Sir Howard Barker Scholarship, and an Honorary Doctorate by the University of Central England. The following year he attended the opening of the new CoBrA Museum in Amstelveen, Holland, and was elected a RA.

To celebrate his centenary in 2015, exhibitions were held at the Fosse Gallery Stow-on-the-Wold, The Redfern Gallery London, and a major retrospective which showed at the Towner Gallery Eastbourne, and City Art Centre Edinburgh.

== Death ==
Gear died on 27 February 1997 in Birmingham. A few days before his death he had visited Hanover to receive the Leporello Prize from the government of Lower Saxony, to mark his work for "democratic art and artistic freedom."

== Legacy ==
A retrospective of Gear's work, Colour and Form, was held at the Royal Birmingham Society of Artists gallery in November 2017, and early the following year the house in Edgbaston where he had lived and worked from 1964 to 1997 was accorded a blue plaque. In 2019 a blue plaque was also added to Gildredge Manor, Eastbourne, the former Towner Art Gallery of which he was curator from 1958 to 1964.
