= Bernard Bergonzi =

British literary scholar (1929–2016)

Bernard Bergonzi FRSL
- Born: 13 April 1929; London, United Kingdom
- Died: 20 September 2016 (aged 87)
- Spouses: Gabriel Wall (died 1984) Anne Samson (m. 1987)
- Children: 3

Bernard Bergonzi FRSL (13 April 1929 – 20 September 2016) was a British literary scholar, critic, and poet. He was Emeritus Professor of English at the University of Warwick and an expert on T. S. Eliot.

He was born in Lewisham, London, the son of an Italian dance band musician, and after a period spent as a clerk in the City studied at South-East London Technical College, Newbattle Abbey College and Wadham College, Oxford, where he read English. He had an academic position in Manchester before moving to Warwick, and held visiting professorships at American universities.

Bergonzi was a practising, somewhat liberal Catholic, who described himself as a "papist critic". He expressed approval at the changes of the Second Vatican Council.

== Works ==
- Godolphin and Other Poems (Latin Press, 1952)
- Descartes and the Animals - Poems 1948–54 (1954)
- The Fantasy Poets: Number 34 (Fantasy Press 1957) with Dennis Keene and Oscar Mellor
- The Early H. G. Wells: A Study of The Scientific Romances (1961)
- L.P.Hartley and Anthony Powell (1962) with Paul Bloomfield, British Council, Writers and Their Work #144, revised 1971 as Bergonzi on Powell
- Heroes' Twilight. A Study of the Literature of the Great War (1965) revised 1980
- An English Sequence (1966) poems
- Innovations: Where is our Culture Going? (1968) editor, with Marshall Mcluhan, Frank Kermode, Leslie Fiedler
- Great Short Works of Aldous Huxley (1969) editor
- T.S.Eliot: Four Quartets (1969) editor, essays
- The Situation of the Novel (1970)
- "The Twentieth Century" (1970) editor, Volume 7 of the Sphere History of Literature in the English Language
- Memorials (1970) poems
- T. S. Eliot (1972)
- The Turn of a Century - Essays on Victorian and Modern English Literature (1973)
- H. G. Wells - A Collection of Critical Essays (1976) editor
- Gerard Manley Hopkins (1977)
- Reading the Thirties (1978)
- Years (Mandeville Press 1979) poems
- The Roman Persuasion (1981) novel
- The Myth of Modernism and Twentieth Century Literature (1986)
- A Short History of English Literature (1990) revision of Ifor Evans
- Exploding English: Criticism, Theory, Culture (OUP, 1991)
- Wartime and Aftermath : English Literature and Its Background, 1939-60 (OUP, 1993)
- David Lodge (1995)
- War Poets and Other Subjects (1999)
- A Victorian Wanderer. The Life of Thomas Arnold the Younger (OUP, 2003)
- A Study in Greene (OUP, 2006)
