= David Haughton =

David Haughton may refer to:

- David Haughton (artist)
- David Haughton (basketball)
