= Michael Bird =

Michael Bird may refer to:

- Michael Bird (politician), economics lecturer and member of the Colorado State Senate, 1984–1994
- Michael Bird (author) (born 1958), British author and art historian
- Michael Bird (bishop) (born 1957), Canadian Anglican bishop
- Michael Bird (theologian) (born 1974), Australian New Testament scholar
- Michael Bird (footballer) (born 1983), English former footballer
- Michael J. Bird (1928–2001), English writer

== See also ==
- Mickey Bird (born 1958), Japanese manga artist
- Michael Byrd, CSPD officer, killed Ashli Babbitt in the 2021 storming of the US Capitol
