= Noel Betowski =

British artist

Noel Betowski (born 1952 in Tilbury, Essex, England) is an artist living and working in Cornwall.

He graduated from Central School of Art and Design in 1976, having been taught by David Haughton. Betowski was a winner of the John Constable prize in 1987 and 1988 and has exhibited at Royal Cornwall Museum, The Royal Academy and The National Portrait Gallery.

Betowski is an elected member of the Penwith Society of Arts and a member of the Newlyn Society of Artists.

His work references Entoptic phenomenon and Dazzle camouflage which was used on shipping to confuse enemy guns in World War II.

== Publications ==
- St. Ives 1893-1993: Portrait of an Art Colony - Marion Whybrow ACC Art Books 1994.
- St. Ives Revisited by Peter Davies Old Bakehouse Publications 1993 ISBN 978-1874538059
- Behind the Canvas - Sarah Brittain & Simon Cook Truran 2001 ISBN 978-1850221593
- Noel Betowski Illumination The Great Atlantic Galleries 2005.
- St. Ives 1975-2005: Art Colony in Transition - Peter Davies St Ives Printing & Publishing Co 2007 ISBN 978-0948385452
- Noel Betowski-Triptych - Minchin 2009.
- Noel Betowski - Out of Nowhere - Royal Cornwall Museum, exhibition catalogue 2011.

== See also ==
- List of St Ives artists
