= Mary McCrossan =

English artist (1865-1934)

- Born: 1865; Liverpool, England
- Died: 3 November 1934 (aged 68–69)
- Education: Liverpool School of Art; Académie Delécluse
- Known for: Artist

Mary McCrossan (1865 - 3 November 1934) was a British painter, who painted landscapes and marine scenes.

== Biography ==
McCrossan was born in Liverpool and attended the Liverpool School of Art and subsequently studied at the Académie Delécluse in Paris. McCrossan was a successful student, winning gold and silver medals and a travelling scholarship while at Liverpool and a silver medal and a travelling scholarship during her time in Paris. McCrossan moved to St Ives in Cornwall where she studied with the artist Albert Julius Olsson and established her own studio. Later she would also maintain a studio at Cheyne Walk in London.

McCrossan exhibited with the New English Art Club, the International Society of Sculptors, Painters and Gravers, the Royal Society of Painter-Etchers and Engravers and at the Paris Salon. She first exhibited at the Royal Academy in London in 1898. During her career she exhibited some twenty-two pieces in total there. In 1914 McCrossan exhibited views of Venice at the Société Nationale des Beaux-Arts in Paris. In 1926, she was elected to the Royal Society of British Artists. The Walker Art Gallery in Liverpool held a memorial exhibition for McCrossan and the Contemporary Art Society hold examples of her work.
