= Juanita Casey =

Poet, playwright, novelist and artist

- Born: Joy Barlow; 1925; Teddington, England
- Died: 24 October 2012 (aged 86–87); Okehampton, Devon
- Occupations: Poet, Writer, Artist, Potter, Horse Breeder, Horse Trainer, Zebra Trainer

Juanita Casey (10 October 1925 – 24 October 2012) was a poet, playwright, novelist and artist as well as a horse and zebra trainer and breeder. Her writing celebrates her time in Ireland and the New Forest. Having been critically neglected, Casey returned to prominence with the July 2022 reissue of her darkly comic and poetic 1971 novel, The Horse of Selene.

== Early life ==
Juanita Casey was born in 1925 in England and adopted at birth into a wealthy Southampton-based brewing family by Gerald Haw Taunton Barlow (1878–1952) and his wife Mary (née Bischoff) and named Joy Barlow. Her true heritage has always remained in doubt. Casey was told her mother was an Irish Traveller, Annie Mahoney, but the identity of her biological father was shrouded in mystery, though he was rumoured to have been an English Romany. In the 1980s, Casey found a birth certificate that stated that she was born Lorna at Elm Drive, Teddington to mother Bertha Louise Newman, with no recorded father. It is suspected the story Casey was told may hold some truth as Newman is a common British Romani surname.

She remained in close contact with her extended family, especially an uncle, Andrew Walter Barlow, who had a farm in Herefordshire. Casey suspected he was her real father. A fluent Romani speaker, Barlow introduced her to the world of the circus (which overwintered on his farm), steeplechasers, horse fairs, including those in Ireland, and Gypsy vans. He also took her sailing, kindling a life-long love of tall ships and the sail-carrying J-class yacht.

== Education ==
Casey's education included three boarding schools, among them Elmers Court in Lymington, Hampshire from which she was expelled. When the family moved to Branksome Park, Bournemouth, she attended art school there.

== First marriage ==
Following the outbreak of the Second World War, Casey was working on the land in Cheselbourne, Dorset. Here in 1945, aged 19, she met and married gentleman farmer John "Crusoe" Fisher. She had also become friends with the Powys brothers. She visited John Cowper Powys in Wales and went for walks with Theodore, reminiscing on his friendship with Thomas Hardy.

A sudden decision by Fisher to sell Place Farm at Mappowder and live on an ex-fishing boat, resulted in the purchase of a top rigged schooner, The Star (aka The Looe). A series of vessels followed including the famous Brixham trawler Provident which they sailed to Kinsale, Ireland. In between sailings from their moorings in Fowey and Penzance, their son William was born (in Bournemouth) in 1947. Based in Cornwall, Juanita, an accomplished equestrian artist, began selling her work through Newlyn art galleries as well as in London.

== Second marriage ==
It was in nearby St. Ives that she was introduced to the painter and sculptor Sven Berlin. With him she had another son, Jasper.

Berlin became disillusioned with the modernist movement and the influence of Ben Nicholson, Barbara Hepworth and others. Following their marriage in Penzance in 1953, the family travelled to the New Forest in a Gypsy wagon. They set up camp not far from Shave Green, one of the last compounds in the New Forest. A local farmer's kindness allowed them to move off the Forest into a field and the couple continued to paint and exhibit their work; in 1956 they held an exhibition at the Bladon Gallery, in Hurstbourne Tarrant, Hampshire (opened by Augustus John and attended by numerous Gypsy families) while in the same year Juanita exhibited her monotypes at the Berkeley Gallery in London - her 'straining, fiery horses...jumping out of their frames' wrote her friend the author Denys Val Baker in 'Britannia & Eve'magazine. Her play 'Stallion Eternity' was transmitted by the BBC on 15 November of the same year.

When Juanita came into an inheritance it allowed her to buy Home Farm in Emery Down in the New Forest, where the couple set up a zoo. Here she kept and bred Appaloosas and endeavoured to breed a zorse (a striped horse) keeping two zebras among other unusual animals.

At the same time she was supporting Berlin in his efforts to continue his work as a writer and artist, finding little time for her own creativity. Among the many friends and acquaintances who visited them in the New Forest were Robert Graves with whom she had a long correspondence, Denys Val Baker, Vaughan Williams and Augustus John as well as their neighbour John Boorman. Juanita appears in the 1961 Mai Zetterling film Lords of Little Egypt made about the Gypsy festival of Les Saintes-Maries de la Mer in the Camargue in which she acted as interpreter.

== Third marriage ==
Juanita, aged 38, met Irish journalist Fergus Casey (27) when the Berlins employed him as a groom in Emery Down. Leaving Berlin and the New Forest they married in Cornwall in 1963 following her divorce - their witnesses were the Scottish poet W S Graham and his wife Nessie who lived in Mevagissey. Their daughter Sheba was born the same year.

Based in Ireland with Fergus and Sheba in the 1960s, she began writing seriously. Fergus was found drowned in 1971, leaving Juanita to raise her daughter, and she moved to Sneem in County Kerry. By now her poetry and short stories were being published, significantly by Liam Miller's The Dolmen Press, while she was working in the pottery decorating pots and plates. She was a regular at the Listowel Writers' Week .

In 1974 she returned to the UK where she joined Roberts' Circus as Horse Master but succumbed to a more settled lifestyle when she made her home in Okehampton, Devon, with her daughter Sheba, where she continued to write. Juanita is considered 'the first in Ireland to write haiku as we know them', and as well as poetry she produced short stories and completed her extensive autobiography Azerbaijan! She always maintained her profound interest in horses and sailing ships and her connections with the Romany people.

== 2022 reissue of The Horse of Selene ==
Casey returned to prominence in the summer of 2022 when Tramp Press reissued her 1971 cult classic, The Horse of Selene, in an edition with an Afterword by Mary M. Burke. The Irish Times hailed the novel as 'strange, mystical and utterly hypnotic.'

== Bibliography ==
=== Poetry ===
• Horse by the River and other poems (Dublin: The Dolmen Press 1968)

- Eternity Smith & Other Poems (Dublin: The Dolmen Press 1985);
- Numerous contributions to collections including:
- Our Shared Japan. Edited by Irene De Angelis & Joseph Woods. Afterword by Seamus Heaney. A collection of poems by Irish writers. (Dedalus Press 2007)
- The White Page/An Bhileog Bhán: Twentieth Century Irish Women Poets (English and Irish Edition) Joan McBreen, Salmon Poetry 1999

=== Novels and Short Stories ===
- Hath the Rain a Father? (London: Phoenix House Ltd.1966)
- The Horse of Selene (Dublin:The Dolmen Press; London: Calder & Boyars 1971; NY: Grossman 1972; rep. 1985; Dublin: Tramp Press, 2022)
- The Circus (Dublin:The Dolmen Press 1974; Nantucket, Mass: Longship Press [1974])
- The Seagull (short story). Set as GCSE examination coursework in 2005 in a comparison with Thomas Hardy's The Withered Arm.
- Azerbaijan! (Autobiography). Limited Edition. Edited by Sonia Aarons (New Forest: Millersford Press: 2008).
- Short stories, poetry and articles reproduced in:

Chicago Review, Reader's Digest, Horse & Hound, Ireland of the Welcomes magazine, Irish Times, Western Mail and in anthologies of poems and short stories.

=== Collected works and contributions ===
- A Grab-bag of Juanita Casey, Journal of Irish Literature, X, 2 (May 1981); Also published as Juanita Casey A Sampling. No. 3 The Proscenium Chapbooks. Proscenium Press, Newark, DE (1981)

=== Plays ===
- Stallion Eternity (BBC commissioned play, transmitted November 1956 )
- 30 Gnu Pence (a reading at The Abbey Theatre, Dublin 1973)

== Further listening ==
Interview with Mary M. Burke on Juanita Casey. "Arena." RTÉ (Irish national radio). 27 July 2022.
