= Michael Bird (author) =

British author and art historian

Michael Bird (born 12 April 1958) is a British author and art historian. He was born in London and educated at Haberdashers' Aske's School and Merton College, Oxford. After teaching at Sherborne School he worked in publishing, including a stint on the editorial team of the Macmillan Dictionary of Art (now Oxford Art Online). Throughout the 1980s and 1990s, Bird published poetry, essays and reviews. His books on modern British art include monographs on the artists Sandra Blow (2005), Bryan Wynter (2010), Lynn Chadwick (2014) and George Fullard (2017),The St Ives Artists: A Biography of Place and Time (2008, 2nd edn. 2016) and Studio Voices: Art and Life in 20th-century Britain (2018). He has also written a history of art for children, Vincent's Starry Night and Other Stories (2016).

Bird has written for The Times, The Guardian, The Daily Telegraph, Modern Painters, Tate Etc and PN Review. His work for radio includes contributions to the BBC arts programmes Kaleidoscope, Night Waves and The Essay, and features for BBC Radio 3 and 4, including The Wreck of the Alba (2009), based on a painting by Alfred Wallis, Lanyon's Last Flight (2011), The Flower Fields (2012) and Frost–Heron (2017).

Bird was National Life Stories Goodison Fellow in 2016. In 2018 he was appointed Royal Literary Fund Fellow at the University of Exeter.

Bird lives in Cornwall with his wife, the artist Felicity Mara.

== Select bibliography ==
=== Books ===
- Sandra Blow (2005). Lund Humphries. ISBN 978-0853319214
- The St Ives Artists: A Biography of Place and Time (2008). Lund Humphries. ISBN 978-0853319566
- Bryan Wynter (2010). Lund Humphries. ISBN 978-1848220096
- 100 Ideas that Changed Art (2012). Laurence King Publishing. ISBN 978-1856697958
- Lynn Chadwick (2014). Lund Humphries. ISBN 978-1848221352
- Vincent's Starry Night and Other Stories: A Children's History of Art (2016). Laurence King Publishing. ISBN 978-1780676142
- George Fullard: Sculpture and Survival (2017). Gallery Pangolin. ISBN 978-0957041738
- Studio Voices: Art and Life in 20th-century Britain (2018). Lund Humphries/British Library. ISBN 978-1848222304
- Lynn Chadwick: A Sculptor on the International Stage (with contributions by Daniel Chadwick, Eva Chadwick, Sarah Marchant and Marin R. Sullivan) (2018). Scheidegger & Spiess. ISBN 978-3858818249
- Artists' Letters: Leonardo da Vinci to David Hockney (2019). White Lion Publishing. ISBN 978-0711241282

=== Selected essays and articles ===
- ‘The perception of symmetry’, Tate Etc. (Spring 2004)
- 'In character: Alexander Mackenzie and Landscape', Alexander Mackenzie (exhib. cat., London: Austin/Desmond Fine Art, 2007)
- ‘The transformed total: the constructions of Margaret Mellis’, Margaret Mellis (exhib. cat., London: Austin/Desmond Fine Art, 2008)
- ‘I have heard of your paintings: an artist in rehearsal’, Lisa Wright: The Histories (exhib. cat., London: Beardsmore Gallery/Roundhouse, 2008)
- ‘Myth and continuity: Peter Lanyon’s Porthmeor’, Porthmeor: A Lanyon Mural Rediscovered (exhib. cat., Bath: Victoria Art Gallery, 2008)
- ‘Questions of balance: Sandra Blow’, Sandra Blow (exhib. cat., Beaux Arts London, 2009)
- 'Janet Leach, William Marshall, Jason Wason' (exhib. cat. essay on Jason Wason) (London: Austin Desmond Fine Art, 2011)
- 'Introduction: Dressed in Human Form', The Sculpture of Kenneth Armitage, by James Scott and Claudia Milburn (Lund Humphries, 2016)
- 'Figures in the Post-war Landscape', Facing Fear: Giacometti / Chadwick (exhib. cat., Zwolle: Museum de Fundatie, 2018)
