= Peter Lanyon =

English painter (1918–1964)

- Born: George Peter Lanyon; 8 February 1918; St Ives, Cornwall, England
- Died: 31 August 1964 (aged 46); Taunton, Somerset, England
- Education: Penzance School of Art, Euston Road School
- Known for: Painting, Sculpture
- Movement: Modernism, abstract art

George Peter Lanyon (8 February 1918 – 31 August 1964) was a British painter associated with the St Ives School. His work brought together landscape painting and abstract art, drawing on the coast, communities and industries of his native Cornwall. Although his mature paintings often appear abstract, they remained rooted in particular places and in his experience of space, weather and movement. He also made constructions, ceramics and collages.

Lanyon developed his practice through contact with Ben Nicholson and Naum Gabo, and subsequently with American painters associated with abstract expressionism. His paintings included Porthleven (1951), St Just (1953) and the works inspired by gliding that occupied much of his final years. He began gliding in 1959 and used flight to extend his exploration of landscape into the movement and forces of the air. He died in 1964 following a gliding accident, aged 46. Subsequent exhibitions and scholarship have examined his contribution to the development of modern landscape painting.

== Life and career ==
=== Early life and training ===
Lanyon was born in St Ives on 8 February 1918, the son of Herbert Lanyon and Lilian Priscilla Vivian. Both families had connections with Cornish mining. He was educated at St Erbyn's School in Penzance and Clifton College in Bristol, and received tuition from the painter Borlase Smart. He attended Penzance School of Art and, on the advice of the critic Adrian Stokes, studied briefly at the Euston Road School in London under Victor Pasmore.

The arrival of Nicholson, Barbara Hepworth and Gabo in St Ives in 1939 brought him into direct contact with modernist painting and sculpture. Nicholson gave him private lessons, while Gabo's constructions offered another approach to form and space. Lanyon began making constructions alongside his paintings; both artists influenced his work during the 1940s.

Lanyon joined the Royal Air Force in March 1940, hoping to become a pilot, but recurrent migraines prevented him from doing so and he served as a flight mechanic. He was stationed in North Africa, Palestine and Italy, and returned to St Ives after his demobilisation in March 1946. In 1946 he married Sheila St John Browne; they had six children between 1947 and 1957.

=== St Ives and the post-war years ===
Lanyon participated in the Crypt Group with John Wells, Sven Berlin and Bryan Wynter, and was a founder member of the Penwith Society of Arts in 1949. He subsequently opposed a proposed division between figurative and non-figurative work, regarding the distinction as incompatible with his own use of abstraction to explore landscape. He resigned from the Penwith Society in 1950.

He exhibited at the Lefevre Gallery in London in October 1949, in an exhibition also featuring Lelia Caetani. His first exhibition at Gimpel Fils followed in 1952. From 1950 to 1957 he taught at the Bath Academy of Art at Corsham Court. During the 1950s he also ran St Peter's Loft, an art school in St Ives, with Terry Frost and William Redgrave.

In 1953 Lanyon spent four months in Italy on an Italian government scholarship. He received the Critics' Prize of the British section of the International Association of Art Critics in 1954 and second prize at the John Moores Exhibition in Liverpool in 1959.

=== International exhibitions and later career ===
Lanyon took part in Three British Painters at the Passedoit Gallery in New York in 1953 and held his first American solo exhibition at the Catherine Viviano Gallery in 1957. His American contacts included Robert Motherwell, Mark Rothko and Joseph Glasco. Glasco became a friend and helped him in his dealings with Viviano.

He continued to exhibit in New York, and in 1962 worked on a mural commission for the home of the collector Stanley Seeger in New Jersey. In 1963 he was a visiting painter at the San Antonio Art Institute in Texas and visited Mexico. He travelled to Czechoslovakia for the British Council in 1964.

Lanyon also served as chairman of the Newlyn Society of Artists. In 1961 he was elected a bard of Gorsedh Kernow for services to Cornish art, taking the name Marghak an Gwyns (Rider of the Winds).

=== Gliding and death ===
In June 1959 Lanyon joined the Cornish Gliding Club at Perranporth Airfield. His first logged instructional flight took place on 5 October that year, and he first flew solo on 30 June 1960. He continued training and had obtained the British Gliding Association's A, B and C certificates by March 1961. He also served on the club's committee and joined a syndicate that bought and restored a 1935 Kirby Kite glider, which he flew regularly.

On 27 August 1964 Lanyon was injured in a landing accident while attending an advanced course in cross-country gliding at Dunkeswell Airfield in Devon. He was taken to hospital in Taunton with spinal injuries and died on 31 August after developing a blood clot following the accident. His friend, the poet W. S. Graham, commemorated him in the elegy "The Thermal Stair".

== Work ==
=== Landscape and abstraction ===
The Cornish landscape provided Lanyon with subjects that included fishing, farming and the region's industrial history. His increasingly abstract handling of paint retained these associations, even as his brushwork became freer during the 1950s. The National Galleries of Scotland describes his principal concern as the evocation of space, air and the sensations of nature.

Lanyon explored places through movement and repeated encounters, bringing different viewpoints and moments into a single painting. Walking, looking over cliffs and changing the position of his body were ways of investigating how a place was experienced. His subjects also extended beyond Cornwall. Visits to Italy generated paintings associated with places such as Saracinesco, which he connected with themes of birth and death.

Lanyon set out his ideas in the 1952 lecture "The Edge of Landscape". He rejected the separation of an observer from nature implied by a fixed viewpoint, arguing that a painting should embody the experience of a person moving through an environment.

His thinking was informed by the philosopher of science Lancelot Law Whyte's The Next Development in Man. Toby Treves and Barnaby Wright relate Lanyon's emphasis on movement to Whyte's understanding of nature as a continuous process, and to his criticism of ideas that separated human beings from their environment.

=== Figure and mythology ===
Lanyon often developed related paintings in series. Treves interprets the Generation series, which includes The Yellow Runner (1946), as a sequence concerning the conception, gestation and birth of Lanyon's first child, Andrew, within the wider circumstances of post-war reconstruction.

Human relationships were also expressed through landscape. Lulworth (1956), the first painting in the Susan series, referred both to the Dorset cove and, in Lanyon's account, to two embracing lovers. His division of paintings into adjoining areas of land and sea could carry a similar association: he conceived of the land as female and the sea as male.

Classical and Christian subjects appeared in paintings and constructions. Lanyon explored the abduction of Europa by Zeus in plaster works and in the painting Europa (1955). Treves relates Orpheus (1961) and Clevedon Bandstand (1964) to the story of Orpheus and Eurydice, interpreting the myth as a means of expressing grief and separation.

=== Porthleven and the mining paintings ===
Porthleven (1951) developed from an Arts Council commission for the Festival of Britain exhibition Sixty Paintings for '51. Lanyon researched the fishing port extensively and worked for months on an initial version, which he abandoned before making the final painting on board. The work entered the Tate collection in 1953. The critic Mark Hudson describes its harbour imagery as combining recognisable features of the town with the sensation of movement around it, and with suggestions of a fisherman and a waiting woman.

In Botallack (1952), the tall, narrow format evokes a mine built into the cliffs. Treves and Wright describe its combination of surface views, underground shafts and tunnels, and overlapping spatial arrangements as a means of conveying movement through the site. They connect this approach with Lanyon's understanding of his work as a form of realism.

St Just (1953) brought together the history of Cornish mining and the imagery of the Crucifixion. In discussing the painting, the curator Chris Stephens connected its layered forms with the Levant mining disaster of 1919 and with Lanyon's identification with the miners, against the background of his own family's mining connections. Hudson describes its dominant dark form as suggesting both a crucified figure and a mine shaft.

Mining remained a subject in later paintings. Wheal Owles (1958) referred to the mine where twenty workers drowned in 1893. Lost Mine (1959) combined the subject of a mine flooded by the sea with shifting impressions of depth and height.

=== Constructions and other media ===
Lanyon made three-dimensional constructions throughout his career, using materials including glass, metal, tile and plaster, and also produced glazed pottery. The constructions could serve as aids to the development of a painting: assembling and rearranging materials allowed him to investigate relationships between forms and the spaces around them.

Stephens has argued that these objects also merit consideration as sculpture in their own right. Discussing Construction for St Just, made from pieces of old window glass, he interpreted its fragile and visibly reused materials as a reworking of Gabo's approach in the circumstances of the post-war world.

Lanyon admired an exhibition of Kurt Schwitters at Lord's Gallery in London in October 1958. Treves identifies Schwitters's influence in Lanyon's later constructions, which combined painted boards with found objects such as fragments of picture frames, roof tiles and stained glass. In Glide Path (1964), Lanyon attached two lengths of black plastic tubing to the canvas, bringing the construction's use of actual space into a large painting.

=== Materials and working methods ===
Lanyon made much of his own oil paint, grinding pigments with a glass muller and adjusting the mixture of oil and turpentine to vary its flow and consistency. He also used commercially prepared paints and sometimes added sand or sawdust to produce granular surfaces. Between 1946 and 1959 his preferred support was Masonite hardboard, using both its smooth and textured sides. From 1959 he chose canvas for most large paintings, allowing him to work in wider, squarer formats than the standard hardboard sheets.

During the making of Offshore (1959), Lanyon recorded an account of the painting's development over roughly ten days. He described walking at Portreath, observing a fishing boat and the effects of wind and waves, alongside his changing ideas and decisions in the studio. The recording also discussed his preparation of paint and his anticipation of particular brushstrokes.

=== Murals ===
Lanyon completed three major mural commissions between 1959 and 1963. The Conflict of Man with Tides and Sands (1959–1960), for the University of Liverpool, was painted on ceramic tiles; the commission for the University of Birmingham (1963) was painted on board. These public works accompanied the mural for Seeger's house in New Jersey (1962). Lanyon described mural painting as an opportunity to develop landscape painting in relation to the scale and open spaces of modern architecture.

=== Gliding paintings ===
Lanyon's interest in flight and the atmosphere preceded his gliding. Bird flight appeared in the construction White Track (1939) and the painting Bird Wind (1955). Sky (1956) was an early experiment in painting the weather, while Coast Soaring (1958) addressed gliding before he began formal training. He described Silent Coast (1957), developed through a prolonged process of simplification, as the beginning of his weather paintings and a step towards painting the air itself.

Gliding gave Lanyon access to changing relationships between land, sea and sky, and to the thermals and air currents on which unpowered flight depends. His paintings drew on the bodily experience of flying and on the air's changing forces as well as on views of the ground.

Rosewall, completed by the end of January 1960, was his first gliding painting after beginning pilot training. Thermal, Solo Flight and Cross Country followed that spring and summer; these works were exhibited at Gimpel Fils in October 1960. Treves and Wright identify approximately thirty gliding and related late weather paintings, representing just over a third of his oil paintings from 1960 to 1964, with most produced in 1960 and 1961.

In Soaring Flight (1960), Lanyon associated the movement of the eye around the painting with a bird's changes of speed and direction. The red passage on the left sets up a circuit through the composition, with moments of suspension followed by faster movement. The Arts Council Collection contrasts the work's colour and lightness with the earthier palette of his earlier paintings, and relates its expressive brushwork to American abstract expressionism.

Thermal (1960), in the Tate collection, uses layers of blue and white that Hudson interprets as conveying suspension between different atmospheric conditions. Other paintings in the group include Rosewall (1960), Drift (1961), Near Cloud (1964) and Glide Path (1964). Reviewing them in 2015, Sam Cornish emphasised their changes of scale and viewpoint, which could position the viewer above, beneath or within the represented space.

=== Relationship to modern painting ===
Lanyon's work has been interpreted both through the British landscape tradition and through the development of international abstraction. The Courtauld's account of the gliding paintings emphasised his ambition to extend landscape painting, particularly the example of J. M. W. Turner.

Lanyon considered his paintings a form of realism and resisted their classification as abstract expressionism or action painting. In 1954 Patrick Heron argued that his synthesis of different levels of experience distinguished his work from the abstraction of Jackson Pollock. In 1959 Lawrence Alloway suggested that Lanyon might be "our last landscape painter", interpreting his use of movement and changing viewpoints as a renewal of the Picturesque tradition.

Treves and Wright argued in 2015 that the gliding paintings had received comparatively little attention partly because they fitted uneasily within established accounts of the St Ives artists and abstract expressionism. Their subjects frequently concerned air and flight without reference to a particular Cornish location.

Cornish questioned the emphasis on Lanyon as a realist landscape painter in the catalogue accompanying the 2015 Courtauld exhibition. He argued that Lanyon's encounters with American painting, particularly the work of Willem de Kooning, were also essential to understanding his development. In this reading, the paintings' grounding in bodily experience and specific subjects could coexist with their relationship to abstract expressionism.

== Reception and legacy ==
Lanyon's reputation expanded during his lifetime through exhibitions and purchases in Britain and North America. From 1957 his principal buyers were American collectors, including Richard Brown Baker, Seymour H. Knox, Seeger and Joseph Hirshhorn. Treves notes that Lanyon's prominence in North America declined after his death, while British accounts increasingly situated his work within the St Ives artists' colony.

A retrospective at Tate St Ives in 2010–2011, curated by Chris Stephens, examined Lanyon's development across paintings and constructions. Reviewing the exhibition, Hudson argued that his achievement should be assessed in the wider context of the painting of his period.

Soaring Flight: Peter Lanyon's Gliding Paintings, at the Courtauld Gallery from 15 October 2015 to 17 January 2016, was the first exhibition devoted to the gliding paintings. Curated by Toby Treves and Barnaby Wright, it brought together paintings and constructions from public and private collections.

Toby Treves's Peter Lanyon: Catalogue Raisonné of the Oil Paintings and Three-Dimensional Works was published by Modern Art Press on 8 February 2018, the centenary of Lanyon's birth. It catalogues 613 works and includes essays on his historical context and painting technique, as well as a chronology and exhibition history.

Works by Lanyon are held by Tate, the British Council, the Arts Council Collection and the National Galleries of Scotland.

English museum holdings include High Moor (1962) at Bristol Museum & Art Gallery, Offshore (1959) at Birmingham Museum and Art Gallery, Silent Coast (1957) at Manchester Art Gallery and Glide Path (1964) at the Whitworth, University of Manchester.

Other English collections holding his work include the Ashmolean Museum, Oxford, the Fitzwilliam Museum, Cambridge, Abbot Hall, Kendal, the Ferens Art Gallery, Hull, Leeds Art Gallery, the Victoria Art Gallery, Bath, The Box, Plymouth, Cornwall Museum and Art Gallery, Truro, Falmouth Art Gallery and Norwich Castle Museum and Art Gallery.

The Pier Arts Centre in Stromness, Orkney, holds Heather Coast (1963). In Wales, National Museum Cardiff holds Beach Girl (1961), and the Glynn Vivian Art Gallery in Swansea holds Ilfracombe (1960). The Ulster Museum in Belfast holds Rosewall (1960).

University collections include those of the University of Birmingham, the Victoria Gallery & Museum, University of Liverpool, and the University of Chichester. In 2019, Birmingham and Liverpool received large gouache studies for their Lanyon murals through the Acceptance in Lieu scheme.

In the United States, collections holding his work include the Buffalo AKG Art Museum (formerly the Albright-Knox Art Gallery), Carnegie Museum of Art, Cleveland Museum of Art, Hirshhorn Museum and Sculpture Garden, Minneapolis Institute of Art, Princeton University Art Museum, RISD Museum, San Francisco Museum of Modern Art, Smith College Museum of Art, Yale Center for British Art and Yale University Art Gallery.

The Buffalo AKG collection includes Lulworth and Sky, both painted in 1956. Sky was donated by the Seymour H. Knox Foundation in 1971.

On 19 November 2018, Lanyon's Orpheus (1961) sold at Christie's in London for £1,268,750, including the buyer's premium, setting an auction record for his work at the time.

== See also ==
- List of St Ives artists
