= Hayley Lever =

Australian-American painter

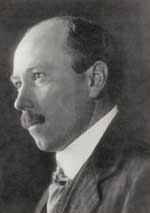
- Hayley Lever
- Born: 28 September 1876; Bowden, South Australia
- Died: 6 December 1958 (aged 82); Mount Vernon, New York, United States
- Education: Adelaide's Prince Alfred College, Ashton's Academy of Arts
- Known for: Painting
- Movement: Impressionism, Post-Impressionism, Modernism and Realism
- Awards: National Academy of Design's Carnegie Prize (1914), Gold medal at the National Arts Club (1915), Amsterdam Olympic Medal for Painting (1928)

Richard Hayley Lever (28 September 1876 – 6 December 1958) was an Australian-American painter, etcher, lecturer and art teacher. His work was part of the art competitions at the 1928 Summer Olympics and the 1932 Summer Olympics.

== Life and work ==
Lever was born in Bowden, South Australia on 28 September 1875, the son of Albion W. Lever. He excelled in painting classes at Prince Alfred College under James Ashton and on leaving school continued to study under Ashton at his Norwood art school. He was a charter member of the Adelaide Easel Club in 1892.

Street Scene, ca 1910

Harbor scene sold at auction for $159,625 in 2005

Summer Sailboats, 1940

Nantucket Yachting Season, Oil on board

Lever's maternal grandfather Richard Hayley, owner of Bowden Tannery, died in 1882, and the subsequent inheritance was sufficient for Lever to finance a trip to England in 1899 to further his career in painting. He moved to St. Ives, a fishing port and artistic colony on the Cornish coast. The town's reputation as a centre for marine painting was largely due to Julius Olsson, who became a prominent British seascape painter. In St. Ives, Lever shared a studio with Frederick Judd Waugh, and studied painting techniques under the Impressionists Olsson and Algernon Talmage. Lever also painted in the French port villages of Douarnenez and Concarneau, Brittany, directly across the English Channel from St. Ives.

In late 1904 Lever made a trip back to Adelaide, where his mother was dying of tuberculosis. During his twelve-month stay he staged several exhibitions, painted seascapes and taught. In 1906, upon returning to Europe, he married Aida Smith Gale in St. Ives' Parish Church. In 1908, Lever did a series of paintings called Van Gogh's Hospital, Holland expressing the profound influence he felt from that artist.

In 1911, Ernest Lawson, an Impressionist painter, persuaded Lever to move to United States, saying he would have greater success there. Lever arrived in New York City in 1912 and painted views of the Hudson River, Times Square and Central Park. Upon discovering the American east coast, he painted in Gloucester, Massachusetts for several summers and at Marblehead, Massachusetts. Both artists developed spontaneous, bold painting styles, and Lever was accepted into Lawson's circle of friends: Robert Henri, William Glackens, John Sloan and George Bellows. He exhibited with this group regularly, but eventually left New York to settle in Massachusetts.

From 1919 to 1931, Lever taught art classes at the Art Students League of New York where he maintained a Gloucester studio and often traveled to paint on Nantucket and Martha's Vineyard. He offered this message to his students: "Art is the re-creation of mood in line, form and color. If I were confined to my own back yard for the rest of my life, I'd still have more pictures in my mind than I would have time to paint. Art is nothing but having a good time." Lever went to Pittsburgh in 1922 as an art juror for the Carnegie International exhibition.

In 1924, Lever was commissioned to paint a portrait of the presidential yacht, USS Mayflower, which was subsequently presented to President Calvin Coolidge in the Cabinet Room of the White House.

By 1930, Lever had moved to Caldwell, New Jersey, staying there until 1938, when he moved to Mount Vernon, New York. While living in New York, Lever painted marines and landscapes in New Jersey, New England, New York and the Canadian Maritimes. Throughout his life, he traveled and painted extensively, including Nova Scotia and Grand Manan Island in Canada, The Bahamas and Florida, while often returning to Europe. In 1933, Hayley was named Director of the Green Mountains summer art school at Smugglers Notch in Stowe, Vermont. Lever also taught painting classes at the Forum School of Art in Bronxville, New York from 1934 to 1935.

In later life, Lever was inflicted with arthritis in his right hand, which prevented him from further travel and forced him to concentrate on still-life subjects instead. As his arthritis advanced, he taught himself to paint with his left hand. However, following the death of his wife Aida in 1949, Lever was confined to his home, where he continued to paint from 1953 until his death.

Hayley Lever died on 6 December 1958 at his home in Mount Vernon, New York. News of his death surprised some: Lever had all but disappeared from public view over two decades earlier, despite once having been enormously popular and critically acclaimed. Even so, he had continued to paint in the intervening years to such a degree that colleagues and dealers alike were confounded by the cache of unsold, and largely unseen, paintings in his Mount Vernon barn. Since his death, he has been recognized as one of the leaders of American Impressionism in the 20th century.

== Displayed works/exhibitions ==
=== Displayed works ===
- White House
- The Hirshhorn Museum and Sculpture Garden
- Baltimore Museum of Art
- Detroit Institute of Arts, Michigan
- The Montclair Art Museum, New Jersey
- The Brooklyn Museum of Art
- The Nantucket Historical Association, Massachusetts
- New Britain Museum of Art, Connecticut
- Corcoran Gallery of Art, Washington, D.C.
- Dallas Museum of Art
- The Wichita Art Museum
- Des Moines Art Museum
- Fort Worth Museum of Art
- L.A. County Museum of Art
- The Westmoreland Museum of American Art
- Telfair Academy
- National Arts Club
- National Academy of Design
- Memphis Art Museum; Australia Art Museum
- Cincinnati Art Museum
- The Addison Gallery of American Art
- Sydney Art Gallery of Australia
- Art Gallery of South Australia (one work only – The last glow, St. Ives fishing fleet)

=== Exhibitions ===
2010	"Gilded Age to Modern Era Paintings: An Exhibition of European and American Fine Art", Galerie Werner, Pittsburgh, Pennsylvania
2010	"American Still-Life Paintings (1829–2009)", Spanierman Gallery, New York
2005	"Art In Bloom – Works from the Permanent Collection", Norton Museum of Art, West Palm Beach, Florida
2003	"Hayley Lever (1876–1958)", Spanierman Gallery, New York
1922–1946	The Whitney Museum of American Art, New York
1945	Westchester Arts & Crafts
1945	Art Institute of Chicago; Machbeth, Rehn, Ferargil, Daniels, French, & Company; Clayton Galleries
1914–1941	Corcoran Gallery Biennials, New York
1940	Pennsylvania Academy of Fine Arts Annual Exhibition
1940	National Arts Club, New York
1938	National Academy of Design, New York
1936	National Academy of Design, New York
1936	Newark Art Club, Newark, New Jersey
1934	Salons of America, New York
1913–1932	Pennsylvania Academy of Fine Arts Annual Exhibition
1927	Frank K. M. Rehn Gallery, New York City (two-person show with Jan Matulka)
1926	Sesqui-Centennial Exposition, Philadelphia
1922	National Arts Club, New York
1920	Society of Independent Artists, New York
1920	Buffalo Fine Arts Academy
1918	Philadelphia Watercolor Club, Pennsylvania
1914–1916	National Arts Club, New York
1915	Panama-Pacific International Exposition, San Francisco, California
1914	Memorial Art Gallery in Rochester
1914	Syracuse Museum of Fine Arts
1914	National Academy of Design, New York
1905	New Salon, Paris
1904	Adelaide, South Australia
1904	The Royal Academy, London

== Memberships ==
- National Academy of Design
- National Arts Club
- New Society of Artists
- Royal Society of British Artists
- Royal Institute of Oil Painters
- Royal West of England Academy
