= David Haughton (artist) =

British painter (1924–1991)

- Born: David Haughton; 1924; London
- Died: 1991 (aged 66–67); London
- Known for: Painting

David Haughton (1924–1991) was a British artist associated with the St Ives movement. Many of his paintings, etchings and drawings feature aspects of the Cornish landscape, particularly the area around St Just.

== Biography ==
Haughton was born in London, spent his early childhood in India and later studied painting at the Slade School. In 1947 he moved to Nancledra, near St Ives, where he became a member of the Penwith Society. He left Cornwall to teach at the Central School of Art and Design in London from 1951 to 1984.

After 'discovering' St Just while on a bicycle ride with Kit Barker, a friend and artist, Haughton wrote:

The turning point in my life occurred when I first discovered the town of St. Just. What happened to me on that Spring day was inexplicable, but it was an experience that has, I believe, happened to a good many people. The mystics have found it impossible to describe in detail, and they use very generalized terms. But once one has experienced anything of that nature it is impossible to forget it. And unless one is quite unworthy of one’s human dignity one must live by it for the rest of one’s life. I have no idea what caused it, whether it really was the divine and transcendant visitation that it so clearly seemed to be or merely a freak of one’s chemistry. But I do know that it was all important and unutterably beautiful, a trance that went beyond logic but never against it, and that I was at home and everything was mine, loving and tender, the landscape and houses a living thing. (David Haughton from a letter to Norman Levine)

John Halkes has also written about the artist's fascination with the Cornish town:

The excitement of St Just gripped David Haughton back in the late forties. He has spent the best part of thirty years painting and drawing there. Even when he left West Cornwall in 1951, to teach in London, he returned each year to work. Countless students who have been privy to his company on these visits have also been transformed by his insight and enthusiasm.

Haughton was a friend of the artists Robert Colquhoun and Robert MacBryde. A portrait of him by Colquhoun is in the Dundee Art Galleries and Museums Collection.

Haughton died in London in 1991.

== Exhibitions ==
Selected one man exhibitions:

- Hilton Gallery Cambridge 1964;
- David Haughton paintings, drawings, prints 1948–79, Newlyn Art Gallery, Newlyn (toured to Exeter, Cirencester and Sheffield) 1979;
- David Haughton paintings, drawings and prints, Work of Art Gallery, London, 1983;
- David Haughton in St Just, Penlee House, Penzance, 13 January – 17 March 2018.

Selected group exhibitions:

- Crypt Gallery, St.Ives 1948;
- Penwith Gallery, St.Ives 1949–52;
- Piccadilly Gallery, 1965;
- Four Holistic Painters, Commonwealth Institute 1972;
- St Ives 1939-64: 25 years of painting, sculpture and pottery, Tate Gallery, 1985.

== Public collections ==
Haughton's work is held by the Arts Council Collection, Derbyshire County Council, the Kyffin Art Collection at the National Library of Wales, Newnham College, Cambridge, the Towner Gallery, the Victoria and Albert Museum and other organisations.
