= Albert Julius Olsson =

Albert Julius Olsson RA (1 February 1864 – 7 September 1942) was a British maritime artist and keen yachtsman. Olsson cruised with his yacht most summers, and The Studio commented: 'He knows the way from the Scillies to the Isle of Wight as most men know their way to the nearest railway station.'

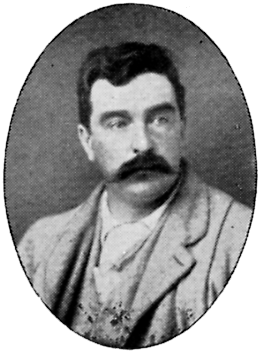
Albert Julius Olsson, was a British maritime artist.

== Biography ==
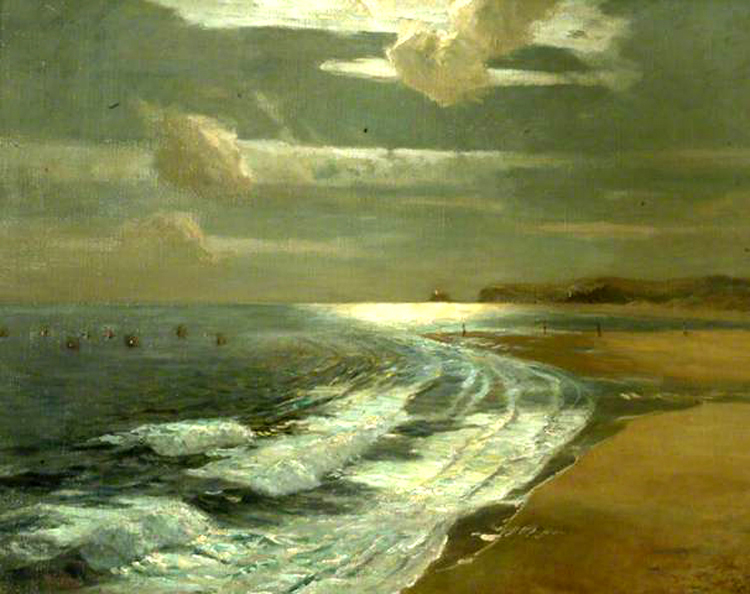
Silver Moonlight, St Ives Bay.

Olsson was born in Islington, London, to a Swedish father and an English mother. He exhibited a painting of Newlyn in 1887, and sold a painting at Newlyn in 1897. By then he was an important figure in the St Ives school of artists where, from circa 1890 to 1912, despite having little or no formal artistic training himself, he taught alongside Louis Grier and later Algernon Talmage. His work was first accepted at the Royal Academy in 1890, and he joined the New English Art Club in 1891. In 1912 he returned to London. During his time at St. Ives, the town drew in many artists and Olsson taught many of them, including Mary McCrossan and Richard Hayley Lever, Reginald Guy Kortright, Emily Carr, John Anthony Park, Charles David Jones Bryant, Robert Borlase Smart and many others. In 1914 Olsson was elected an Associate member of the Royal Academy. During the First World War he served as a lieutenant in the RNVR, giving him the opportunity to paint naval ships in action. He became a full member of the Royal Academy in 1920.

In St Ives, with his artist wife Kathleen, he designed and set up home at what was to become (until 2014) the St Eia Hotel. St Eia was situated with views North to St Ives Harbour and round to the east overlooking Carbis Bay, and during their time there it was to house a studio and become a school of art. Elsewhere it is stated that (after leaving St Ives) he married Edith Ellison in 1925. Edith was the daughter of an Irish horse breeder, and after the marriage he made frequent painting trips both to Ireland and to Sweden.

In the Second World War Olsson was bombed out of his London studio. He died at Dalkey, near Dublin, in 1942. His works may be found in museums all over the UK.
