= Alexander Mackenzie (artist) =

English painter (1923–2002)

Alexander Mackenzie (9 April 1923 – 18 September 2002) was a British abstract artist, an active member of the Penwith Art Society and Newlyn Art Gallery and educator.

== Personal life ==
Mackenzie was born on 9 April 1923 in Liverpool. He was married to Coralie Crockett and the couple had three daughters, Pat, Althea and Rachel.He died in Penzance on 18 September 2002.

He had a brother named Paul Mackenzie who had three daughters Alison, Alexandra and Elli Mackenzie.

== Career ==
At the beginning of the World War II, Mackenzie's school was evacuated to Newburgh Priory, which was part of his introduction to art – he later described it as "a marvellous place, filled with tapestries and paintings".

As soon as he was old enough, he enlisted in the army, serving for 5 years in the armoured Inns of Court Regiment. He fought in the European theatre of war, including commanding an armoured car up the beaches on D-Day. Following his demobilisation in 1945, he studied at Liverpool College of Art. He graduated in 1950, and the following year he moved to Cornwall, where he soon established close relationships with many artists, including Ben Nicholson and Barbara Hepworth. He was based in Cornwall for the rest of his life.

For several years he taught art at Leskudjack school in Penzance before becoming a senior lecturer at Plymouth College of Art and Design in 1964. He spent the next 20 years at the college as Head of the Department of Fine Art.

His auction record is £27,500, set for Gwithian at Christie's, London, on 27 May 2010.

== Collections ==
His Drawing, June 1963 is in the Tate collection. Two works are in the Arts Council collection.

Mackenzie's art work can be seen at The Suter Art Gallery, Nelson, New Zealand, Brasenose College, University of Oxford, Bradford City Art Gallery, the Calouste Gulbenkian Foundation collection, the Contemporary Art Society collection, Art Gallery of New South Wales, Sydney, Australia, the Nuffield Foundation collection, Plymouth City Art Gallery, Salford Museum & Art Gallery and York Art Gallery.

== Exhibitions ==
Mackenzie exhibited widely throughout his life and posthumously, and was included in the following significant exhibitions:

=== Solo exhibitions ===
- 1959, 1961, 1963: Waddington Galleries, London
- 1960, 1962: Durlachers Gallery, New York
- 1965: Paintings by Alexander Mackenzie, Plymouth City Art Gallery
- 1965, 1968, 1970: Maltzahn Gallery, London
- 1977: Retrospective Exhibition Paintings and Drawing by Alexander Mackenzie, the Truro Gallery
- 1980: Newlyn Orion Gallery, Newlyn
- 1982: Festival Gallery, Bath
- 1999: Austin/Desmond Fine Art, London
- 2007: Austin/Desmond Fine Art

=== Selected group exhibitions ===
- 1952: Penwith Society of Arts, St Ives (and then annually)
- 1955: Daily Express Young Artists Exhibition, London
- 1959: Whitechapel Art Gallery Graven Image
- 1959: Arte Grafica Britanico, Bogotá, Colombia
- 1960: Bradford City Art Gallery, Contemporary British Art
- 1960: Brooklyn Museum, 21st International Water Colour Biennal, New York,
- 1961: Arts Council Exhibition, New Painting 58-61
- 1962–63: Premio Marzotto E L’Arte, European Community Contemporary Painting Exhibition, Rome, Milan and London
- 1970: Plymouth City Art Gallery, Alexander Mackenzie and Bryan Wynter
- 1975: Plymouth City Art Gallery, Painting & Sculpture 1975
- 1977: New Art Centre, Cornwall 1944–55
- 1977: Kunst Aus Cornwall, Cuxhaven, Germany
- 1984: Newlyn/Orion, Second Nature, toured to the Institute of Contemporary Arts, London
- 1985: Tate Gallery, St Ives 1939–64
- 1985: Plymouth City Art Gallery, Landscape: Fact and Feeling
- 1986: Pallant House Gallery, Cornwall in the 80s
- 1987: Newlyn Art Gallery, Looking West, touring to the Royal College of Art, London
- 1992: Royal West of England Academy, Artists in Cornwall

== Bibliography ==
- Herbert Read & Roland Penrose: Premio Marzotto Award Catalogue, 1963
- A. Cumming: Profile of Alexander Mackenzie, Arts Review, Vol XX No.20
- Sir Herbert Read: Contemporary British Art, Penguin Publications, 1964
- Dictionary of Twentieth Century Art, Phaidon Press, 1973
- Tate Gallery, Catalogue of Acquisitions 1976-8
- Arts Council Collection, 1979
- Richard Mabey: Second Nature, Jonathon Cape, 1984
- Tate Gallery, St Ives 1939–64, Tate Gallery Publications, 1985
- Alan Windsor: Handbook of Modern British Painting 1900–1980, Scolar Press, 1992
- Peter Davies: St Ives Revisited, Old Bakehouse Publications, 1994
- Melissa Hardie: 100 Years in Newlyn/Diary of a Gallery, Pattten Press, 1995
- David Archer: Alexander Mackenzie, Austin/Desmond Fine Art, 1999
- Michael Bird: Alexander Mackenzie: In character, Austin/Desmond, 2007
- Keith Chapman: 'Alexander Mackenzie - Paintings 1951 to 2001', Styca Publishing, 2023
