= Robert Borlase Smart =

British painter (1881–1947)

Robert Borlase Smart RBA ROI RBC RWA SMA, generally known as Borlase Smart (11 February 1881 – 3 November 1947) worked as an art editor and critic on the Western Morning News / Illustrated Western Weekly News from 1901 to 1913, but is principally known as an artist, in which capacity he became a founding member of the St Ives School during the years following his return from the First World War.

== Artistic career ==
Borlase Smart was born in Kingsbridge, Devon, and studied at Plymouth Art College between 1897 and 1900, and obtained, after a further year's study, a first class honours certificate in teaching from the Royal College of Art in 1901.

Smart worked as an art editor and critic at the Western Morning News which, while he was there, became the Illustrated Western Weekly News, from 1901 to 1913. During this time he continued to paint.

In 1912 his painting ‘Moonlight on the Cornish Riviera’ made it through the selection process and was hung in the Royal Academy Summer Show. Following this recognition of his abilities he decided to become a professional artist and he gave up his post as a journalist and moved to St Ives, Cornwall in 1913 to study seascape painting. He became a student at the School of Painting which had been established by Julius Olsson in 1895.

During the First World War he served with the Artists Rifles, the Machine Gun Corps, the London Regiment and the Queen’s Regiment. During the conflict he made charcoal and wash drawings which illustrated the conditions that the soldiers endured at the front and the destruction of towns and villages on the Somme, at Arras and at Ypres. These drawings were exhibited at the Fine Art Society in London in 1917, The Harris Galleries in Plymouth and Lanham’s Gallery in St Ives in 1919. In 1916 he met and established a lifelong friendship with Leonard Fuller while they were producing illustrations of the Lewis gun.

In 1919, Smart, now married, moved to St Ives to occupy the Ocean Wave Studio. In the three decades that followed, Smart gained a reputation as a fine painter and an organiser and promoter of the St Ives artistic community. He was known for encouraging emerging artists.

He exhibited at the first exhibition of the Society of Graphic Art in London in 1921.

Borlase Smart published a number of books on the techniques of painting (including 'The Technique of Seascape Painting' , published in 1934), and was a key figure, in the final year of his life, in establishing a permanent home for the St Ives Society of Arts in the Mariners' Church.

== Personal life ==
He married Kathleen Irene Godson on 31 October 1917.

They had two sons Michael, born in 1926 and Brian, born in 1929.

He died at home, in St Ives, Cornwall, on 3 November 1947, of a heart attack.

== Bibliography ==
- Hardie, Melissa (2009). Artists in Newlyn and West Cornwall 1880-1940. Art Dictionaries Limited. ISBN 978-0953260966
- Marion Whybrow (2012). Borlase Smart – St Ives Artist – Man of Vision. Halstar. ISBN 978-1906690410
- Marion Whybrow (2012). St Ives 1883-1993 Portrait of an Art Colony. Halstar. ISBN 978-1851491704
- David Carter (2014). Borlase Smart – A Life in Art. Sims Gallery. ISBN 978-1291959079
