= Sven Berlin =

English painter, writer and sculptor (1911–1999)

- Born: 14 September 1911 Sydenham, London, England
- Died: 14 December 1999 (aged 88) Wimborne, Dorset, England
- Occupation: Painter, sculptor, poet, writer and dancer

Sven Paul Berlin (14 September 1911 – 14 December 1999) was an English painter, writer and sculptor. He is now best known for his controversial fictionalised autobiography The Dark Monarch, which was withdrawn just days after publication in 1962 following legal action. The book became the theme of an exhibition in Tate St Ives in autumn 2009 when it was re-published.

== Early life ==
Berlin was born and grew up in Sydenham, south-east London, in a conventional household for the time, though he was obliged to leave school due to financial pressures at the age of twelve, pursuing a successful career as an adagio dancer until his mid-twenties, where he met his first wife, Helga.

== First marriage and Second World War ==
In 1938 he moved to Cornwall to develop his artistic skills, and came under the influence of Dr Frank Turk, an Exeter University educationalist, and attended lectures on philosophy, ancient cultures and the arts. A son, Paul, and daughter, Janet (who later adopted the name Greta), were born in Cornwall. In the Second World War Berlin registered as a conscientious objector, and worked in the market garden established by the art critic Adrian Stokes at Little Park Owles, Carbis Bay, outside St Ives, where he met fellow artists Ben Nicholson and Barbara Hepworth. He also began research into the naive artist Alfred Wallis, and his book, the first profile to be written, was eventually published by Tambimuttu's Poetry London in 1949. Berlin later renounced his position as a conscientious objector after observing some distressing naval bombing in the English Channel and joined the Army, taking part in the D-Day landings as a Forward Observer in France, Holland and Belgium. As well as writing about his experiences to Adrian Stokes, he also produced a series of pen and ink drawings of army life, local people and children caught up in the War. A breakdown led to his return, culminating in a divorce soon afterwards.

== St Ives ==
Berlin was a member of the burgeoning artistic community around St Ives on his return and met a local girl, Jacqueline Moran, with whom he moved into a cottage provided by the writer Mabel Lethbridge. He met his second wife, the artist Juanita Fisher in 1949 while living in a small concrete building next to Porthgwidden Beach, dubbed The Tower. Here he became something of a tourist attraction, carving stone outside, stripped to the waist. Among commissions, he illustrated Peggy Pollard's book Cornwall and also exhibited in 1946 at the Lefevre Gallery in London among others. His friendship with writer Denys Val Baker led to numerous contributions to and illustrations of his work in the literary magazine Cornish Review.

Exhibiting paintings, drawings and sculpture regularly with the St. Ives Society of Artists and in London, Berlin was a founding member of the Crypt Group of modern-minded young artists, along with Peter Lanyon, John Wells and Bryan Wynter, and of the Penwith Society of Arts for a short time, before leaving the group following a much-publicised rift between the Modernists, led by Ben Nicholson and Barbara Hepworth on one side and the more representational artists on the other. This artistic clash of egos was the inspiration for The Dark Monarch. Berlin's increasing isolation after he was forced to leave his studio, when the council decided to build new conveniences on the site, led to the Berlins' departure for the New Forest in 1953 after their marriage and the birth of their son, Jasper.

== New Forest ==
Berlin and Juanita settled in the New Forest in Hampshire and lived alongside the gypsies, where he famously recorded, in oil paintings and drawings, the last days of the community in Shave Green, a body of work which was exhibited in 2003 at St Barbe Museum & Art Gallery in Lymington and at the retrospective of his work, Out of the Shadows at Penlee House, Penzance in 2012. Once settled in Home Farm in Emery Down in 1958, he was able to work from a studio and workshop, while Juanita, an accomplished horsewoman, set up a stud farm. He completed his 7.5-ton Carrara marble bas-relief The White Buck in 1958; this was saved from demolition in 2015. Berlin was able to paint, carve, cast bronze in his own foundry and write, exhibiting at shows including in London at Arthur Tooth and Son, and appearing on television and in newspapers. I Am Lazarus (1961), based on his war experiences, and The Dark Monarch (1962) were published. On the latter's publication, four St. Ives residents portrayed in it (none of them artists, although they included the poet and writer Arthur Caddick) began actions for libel.

Berlin was also fascinated by the Romany culture and wildlife of the New Forest, realised in a series of mystical and philosophical stories Jonah's Dream: A Meditation on Fishing and the story of his journey from St. Ives to the New Forest in a gypsy wagon, Dromengro, Man of the Road. His marriage to Juanita, a talented writer, poet and artist in her own right, ended in divorce, after she eloped with Fergus Casey, their groom.

== Later life ==
Berlin met his third wife, Julia, 33 years his junior, and moved to the Isle of Wight in 1970, before finally settling near Wimborne in 1975. He remained prolific in painting, writing and sculpture until his death at the age of 88.

== Selected works ==
- Alfred Wallis: Primitive (Biography) (1949)
- I Am Lazarus (1961)
- The Dark Monarch (1962)
- Jonah's Dream: A Meditation on Fishing (1964)
- Dromengro: Man of the Road (1971)
- Pride of the Peacock – The Evolution of an Artist (1972)
- Amergin (1978)
- Who Wrote Joke Grim? (1993)
- The Coat of Many Colours (1994)
- Virgo in Exile (1996)
- The Rime of the Ancient Mariner (1997) Illustrations and handwritten.
- The Walking Door Bramden Records. Poetry written and read by Sven Berlin
- The Other Man (2005)
- "Teenagers" (1971) a watercolour painting once owned by David Bowie

== See also ==
- List of St. Ives artists
