= Kit Barker =

English painter

- Born: 1916; London, England
- Died: 1985 (aged 68–69)

Kit Barker (1916–1988) was a British painter.

== Biography ==
Barker was born in London, England, to English father George Barker (1879–1965), a police constable and former Army batman, and Irish mother Marion Frances (1881–1953), née Taaffe, from Mornington, County Meath, near Drogheda, Ireland. His elder brother was the poet George Barker; they were raised at Battersea, London, and the family later lived at Upper Addison Gardens, Holland Park.

Barker served in the British Army from 1942 to 1945. In 1948 he married the writer Ilse Gross (1921–2006), who wrote under the pen name Kathrine Talbot. They had one son, Thomas (born 1962). Barker lived in Cornwall from 1947 to 1948, where he and Ilse were involved with the artists' colony in St Ives.

In 1949 the Barkers travelled to the USA where Kit lectured at Skidmore College in New York. Kit later taught with Hassel Smith, Elmer Bischoff and David Park at the California School of Fine Arts in San Francisco (1951–1952). During their time in the USA, the Barkers stayed at Yaddo artists' community in Saratoga Springs, New York.

From 1953 Barker lived on Bexley hill, Sussex and travelled extensively in Europe and the US. He died in West Sussex in 1988.

== Career ==
Barker was a self-taught artist. His influences included the surrealists – he exhibited some surrealist paintings.

His work is found in private collections in Australia, Brazil, Canada, Ireland, the United Kingdom, Mexico, Italy, South Africa, Sweden, the United States and Germany.

== Public collections ==
Barkers works have been purchased by:

- Olsen Foundation, US
- Contemporary Art Society, London
- Magdalen, Nuffield, New and Pembroke Colleges, Oxford
- Memorial Art Gallery, Rochester NY, USA
- Towner Art Gallery, Eastbourne, UK
- Cartwright Hall Art Gallery, Bradford, UK
- West Riding of Yorkshire Education Committee
- Nottingham Training College
- Aberdeen Art Gallery
- Nuffield Foundation Pictures for Hospitals Fund
- Isle of Wight Health Authority Pictures for Hospitals
- Arts Council of Great Britain

== Major solo exhibitions ==
- 1950 Weyhe Gallery, New York
- 1951 Palace of the Legion of Honor, San Francisco
- 1951 St. Louis Artists' Guild, St Louis
- 1957 Hanover Gallery, London
- 1959 Waddington Galleries, London
- 1960 Waddington Galleries, Montreal
- 1961 Waddington Galleries, London
- 1964 Waddington Galleries, London
- 1965 Waddington Galleries, Montreal
- 1966 Waddington Galleries, London
- 1967 Waddington Galleries, Montreal
- 1970 Arthur Tooth & Sons, London
- 1971 Villiers Art Gallery, Sydney, Australia
- 1972 Toorak Gallery, Melbourne, Australia
- 1972 Arthur Tooth & Sons, London
- 1978 Christ's Hospital Arts Centre, Horsham, Sussex
- 1981 The New Arts Centre, London
- 1988 Newburg Street Gallery, London
- 2001 University College Chichester, Otter Gallery, Sussex
- 2005 The Canon Gallery Petworth, Sussex

Barker had regular one man exhibitions throughout the 1960s and 1970s at: The David Paul Gallery, Chichester, Sussex; Reid Gallery, Guildford, Surrey and Century Galleries, Henley on Thames.

== Major group exhibitions ==
- 1948 The Crypt Gallery, St Ives, Cornwall
- 1948 Downings Bookshop, St Ives, Cornwall
- 1948 St George's Gallery, London
- 1949 Durlacher Gallery, New York, NY
- 1951 Whitney Museum of Art, New York, NY
- 1951 Philadelphia Art Alliance, PA
- 1952 Art Institute of Chicago, IL (Drawings from 12 countries)
- 1954 Institute of Contemporary Arts, London (Eight Painters)
- 1957 John Moores Exhibition, Liverpool
- 1959 Contemporary Art Society, London (Recent Acquisitions)
- 1960 Irish Exhibition of Living Art
- 1960 Birmingham City Art Gallery (Contemporary British Painters)
- 1960 International Gallery, Chicago, IL
- 1961 Memorial Art Gallery, Rochester, NY (Two Painters)
- 1962 Festival of Arts, Battle, Sussex
- 1967 Worthing Municipal Art Gallery, Sussex (Two Painters)
- 1969 Camden Arts Centre, London (English Traditional Landscape)
- 1973 Paintings in Hospitals, London
- 1974 Festival of the City of London, London
- 1976 Madden Gallery, London
- 1981 New Arts Centre, London
- 1985 Parkin Gallery, London (Cornwall 1925 -1975)
- 1987 Questra Gallery, Kingston upon Thames, SU
- 1990 Birch and Conran Gallery, London

== Other reproduced works include ==
- Frost and Reed [Venture] prints, 'Marsh Grasses & Inner Harbour, Concarneau 1964.
- Winter At Gurnard's Head, poem poster with David Wright MidNAG 1979.
- Curlew, poem poster with Leslie Norris Armstrong poem poster 1969.
- North Haven, poem poster with Elizabeth Bishop Lord John Press 1979.
