= Latin Press =

The Latin Press was a small letterpress printing business (not, strictly speaking, a private press, although it is sometimes described as such), run by Douglas "Guido" Morris (1910–1980). He became interested in printing in his twenties and first experimented with type and a home-made press in Oxford in 1934. In the following year Morris bought his first iron hand-presses (a small Albion press and a larger Columbian press) and established the Latin Press at Langford, near Bristol, undertaking some of his earliest work for Bristol Zoo.

Morris was a passionate printer and typographical designer, but he was not a good businessman and had to move several times, suffering a series of difficulties and bankruptcy before being called up for active service in 1940. He suffered a breakdown during the War, and for a short while ran a tea-shop with his first wife, Doreen. In 1946, after the break-up of his marriage, he moved to St Ives in Cornwall and re-established the Latin Press. Here he printed posters, catalogues and other ephemera for the local artistic community, and had his most settled period, continuing to operate until 1953, when the Press was again declared bankrupt. Later he worked as an editor and as a guard on London Underground. In 1969 an article about his life and work appeared in The Private Library, and interest in his printing was revived, not least with Morris himself, who bought a small press and began to print again, this time calling his press the "Officina Mauritiana" or "Officina Guidonis". He printed some ephemera and pamphlets between 1970 and 1974, but did not produce work on the scale, or of the quality, of his Latin Press days.

Morris's printing was chiefly "jobbing" work, and he saw himself as a fine jobbing printer. He disliked printing books, although he printed several, for various clients over the years, which work he usually regarded with disdain. He did, however, attempt to launch an artistic/literary periodical called Loquela Mirabilis of which only three issues appeared in 1936 and 1937 before he was forced to abandon the project. While at Saint Ives, he also instituted a series of pamphlets called the Crescendo Poetry Series which was a little more successful, including new work by a number of contemporary poets (as well as by Morris himself). The first Crescendo pamphlet appeared in 1951 and the eighth, and last, in June 1952. Morris generally used Bembo type for his work at the Latin Press, though he did possess other typefaces and once remarked that he believed he had made a mistake in selecting Bembo as his "house" fount. When he re-established his press in 1970 he bought Van Dijck types instead.

Morris was a handsome man, with a charming manner, wit, intelligence and intellectual curiosity – qualities which helped him in his many, often short-lived, relationships with women, and in his business dealings (though his financial skills were somewhat limited, and he developed an unfortunate reputation for taking on work which he could not complete and for not paying bills). Specimens of his printing have been collected since the 1930s, and major collections can be found at the Bodleian Library, the British Library (although currently (2008) the main portfolio of ephemera is missing), the Newberry Library at Chicago, and the Bibliothèque Nationale de France, as well as in several private collections. An exhibition of his printing was held at the Tate Gallery, Saint Ives in 1995.
