= John Wells (artist) =

St Ives artist

John Clayworth Spencer Wells (27 July 1907 – 28 July 2000) was an artist and maker of relief constructions, associated with the St Ives group.

== Biography ==
He was born in London and spent his early years in Ditchling, Sussex. He took evening classes at Saint Martin's School of Art from 1927 to 1928 while studying for a medical degree at University College Hospital and exhibited at the Daily Express Young Artists Exhibition in 1927. His mother was Cornish and from 1936 to 1945, he worked as a General Practitioner for the Isles of Scilly. After the Second World War he decided to pursue a full-time career as an artist. At that time he settled in Newlyn, Cornwall and became closely involved with the renowned artistic community at the nearby town of St. Ives. From 1967, Wells shared his Newlyn studio with fellow artist and friend Denis Mitchell.

He was the co-founder of the Crypt Group and the Penwith Society of Arts. He worked with Barbara Hepworth from 1950 to 1951 and exhibited regularly in London, the provinces and abroad. His work is represented in the Tate Gallery. His works of geometric abstraction were influenced by Gabo, Ben Nicholson and Barbara Hepworth.

Wells died on 28 July 2000 on the Penwith peninsula, at the southwest tip of Cornwall.

An exhibition held at the Tate St Ives in 2007, celebrated the centenary of his birth.

== See also ==
- St Ives, Cornwall
- List of St. Ives artists
