= Trevor Bell (artist) =

English painter

- Born: 18 October 1930; Leeds, West Riding of Yorkshire, England, UK
- Died: 3 November 2017 (aged 87)
- Education: Leeds College of Art
- Known for: Painting
- Movement: St Ives group

Trevor Bell (18 October 1930 – 3 November 2017) was an English Leeds-born artist and contemporary visual artist.

== Life and career ==
=== Education ===
Bell was awarded a scholarship to attend the Leeds College of Art between 1947 and 1952 and, encouraged by Terry Frost, moved to Cornwall in 1955.

=== Early life and St Ives ===
Bell was drawn to St Ives, Cornwall as at that time it was the epicentre for British abstract art being the home to the St. Ives group of artists such as Patrick Heron, Peter Lanyon, Ben Nicholson, Barbara Hepworth, and Terry Frost. From these artists, especially Nicholson, Bell received advice and help. Nicholson encouraged him to show in London and Waddington Galleries gave Bell his first solo exhibition in 1958. Patrick Heron wrote the introduction to the exhibition catalogue, stating that Bell was 'the best non-figurative painter under thirty'.

The following year Bell was awarded the prize for painting at the Biennale de Paris. He stayed in St. Ives for five years constantly developing his technique and painting language but in 1960 was offered the Gregory Fellowship in Painting at the University of Leeds so he moved back to his hometown. It was during his time at the University of Leeds that Bell developed his shaped canvases, which set his work apart from other abstract artists of his generation.

In the 1960s Bell showed work in exhibitions in the UK and USA including a major touring exhibition covering the period of 1966 to 1970, organised by the Richard Demarco Gallery in Edinburgh, that travelled to Belfast and Sheffield. During this time his work was bought for the Tate collection.

=== United States ===
In 1973 he presented his new work at the Whitechapel Gallery in London, having just taken part in a major exhibition at the Corcoran Gallery in Washington, D.C. Over the course of the next thirty years Bell combined painting with teaching in various locations eventually moving to Florida State University, Florida, in 1976 to become the Professor for Master Painting. Here with the provision of a warehouse sized studio and time to really develop his painting he produced new and powerful work. He called them his "heatscapes", reflecting the influence of the sub-tropical climate and landscape on him and his work. He would spend the next 20 years in America before returning to west Cornwall, whose dramatic coastlines were an influence upon him, permanently.

=== Return to St Ives ===
In 1985 Bell was included in the London Tate Gallery's St Ives 1939-64 exhibition and in 1993 he was part of the inaugural show of the Tate St Ives, where he was again re-established as part of the St Ives artists. He moved back to Cornwall in 1996 and was invited by David Falconer, the former Director of Millennium (Now Anima-Mundi), to have a solo exhibition in St Ives, which has culminated in a long-term relationship with the gallery and its current Director Joseph Clarke.

=== Death ===
Trevor Bell died on 3 November 2017, at the age of 87 after a "short illness".

== Prizes and fellowships ==
- Paris Biennale – Major Prize Winner
- Gregory Fellow, Leeds University
- Italian Government Scholarship
- Florida Art Fellowship
- Emeritus Professor, Florida State University
- Honorary R.W.A.
- Honorary Fellow, University College Falmouth

== See also ==
- List of St. Ives artists
- St Ives, Cornwall
- Leeds College of Art
- Terry Frost
