= Beatrice Pauline Hewitt =

British painter

Beatrice Pauline Hewitt (1873–1956) was a British painter who created many works which consisted of ocean-themed landscapes, coastal scenes, flower subjects, figures, and portraits.

== Biography ==
At the age of twenty-one, Pauline Hewitt went against her mother's wishes and pursued a career in the arts. Hewitt studied art at the Slade School of Fine Art for six years, alongside fellow students; Theresa Copnall, Augustus John, and Sir William Orpen. There she won many prizes and traveled to Paris, Germany, and London where she exhibited her works regularly. Hewitt once presented her works at an international fair in London, where she won a prize for the best picture executed entirely with Rembrandt oil colors. Hewitt had many connections in the art community, for she was a member and follower of numerous established art organizations. This list included the St. Ives Society of Artists, The Royal Institute of Oil Painters, The International Society of Sculptors, Painters, and Gravers, the Society of Women Artists, the Royal Academy of Arts, and the Royal Glasgow Institute of the Fine Arts.

Pauline Hewitt's career came to a halt as soon as she married her husband and had a son. It wasn't until her son turned twelve, when she began to reimmerse herself into painting once again. In hopes to find more sources of inspiration, Hewitt purchased a small house in St. Ives; otherwise known as the small coastal town nestled in the county of Cornwall, England.. Hewitt was a member of the St. Ives Society of Artists, which grew to be the hub for Cornwall artists to meet and socialize. St. Ives Society of Artists is where she exhibited many of her works, and also organized the fist drawing classes hosted by this art organization.

After forty years living in St. Ives, Hewitt decided to move into a nursing home located in Surrey, England to be closer to her son shortly before her death at the age of eighty-three.

== St. Ives ==
St. Ives, is a small coastal town settled in Cornwall, England where most of Hewitt's source of inspiration derived from. It is said that Hewitt was first introduced to St. Ives during a short holiday in 1912, and stayed there until 1954. Many artists moved to St.Ives after the town's bustling sardine market headed into a heavy decline. There were many reasons to blame for this decline: increased absence of silver shoals, a warm current that traveled away from the coast, and or the decrease of the red water that had run through their rivers. The town's industry began to slowly weaken, which lead to the increase of vacancies in pilchard palaces, net-lofts, and workshops of boat builders, coopers and blacksmiths. For artists, these empty spaces were close substitutes to potential studio spaces. Slowly, an art community began to grow in this quaint town, for the arrival of the Great Western Railway improved the town's accessibility and made it easier to transport works to London for exhibitions. Over time, St. Ives eventually morphed into a visiting center for artists from across the world to come and visit regularly.

=== Life on St Andrews Street ===
Pauline Hewitt purchased a bungalow that looked right out to St Ives’ harbor. This three story one-bedroom house was her home for forty years.

Hewitt painted many works from her balcony, for the bungalow held views that inspired her and another British painter named Patrick Heron. One painting of Herons', “Harbour Window with Two Figures, St Ives: July 1950”, was greatly inspired by the surroundings of Hewitt's bungalow. Heron stated in a letter dating back in Aprils of 1983, that he adored the property so much that he rented the space every year from 1947 to 1954. He wrote about the "immense sensation" he felt when first entering the space. One famous characteristic of Hewitt's bungalow was the balcony, for it provided a vast and open view of St. Ives harbor. One rare black and white photo shows Hewitt peacefully sitting on her balcony looking out towards the bay, accompanied with a canvas in front of her. Hewitt's life was mostly situated in St. Ives for the town's scenes inspired her and neighboring artists in creating many coastal and natural scenes. The ultimate reason she departed from St.Ives was in order spend her last years with her son in Surrey.

== Known works ==
- 1913: Monday St Ives
- 1924: Summer Afternoon; Flowers by a Window
- 1930: Kathleen Bradshaw
- 1938: The Swan Pool
- 1939: Kitzbuhel
- Ladies and Parasols
- Herring Packing
- St Ives
- Mousehole harbour
- Zennor, Cornwall
- Flowerpiece
- Market Day
- Polperro
- Canal scene

== Memberships ==
- 1932, 1934,1936,1937,1947: Society of Women Artists (Touring Shows)
- 1927-1947: Royal Academy of Arts
- 1934: Royal Glasgow Institute of the Fine Arts.
- 1940: Royal Institute of Oil Painters
- 1927-1954: St. Ives Society of Artists

== Exhibitions ==
- 1914: St Ives Summer Permanent Exhibition 1913; Lanham's (Painters and Etchers)
- 1924: Newlyn Art Gallery
- 1928: Porthmeor Gallery Summer
- 1932: St. Ives Society of Artists (tour)
- 1938: Royal Institute Galleries
- 1939: Show Day St Ives
- 1939: Society of Women Artists
- 1880-1940,1996: Falmouth Art Gallery Women Artists in Cornwall
- 2002: Penlee House, Penzance Women Artists in Cornwall Exhibition

== See also ==
1. List of St Ives artists
