= Derek Jenkins (painter) =

British teacher & artist (born c.1937)

- Born: c. 1937; Cardiff, Wales
- Occupations: Teacher, Artist
- Years active: 1989 - 2005
- Known for: Oil Painting
- Notable work: South from Cape Cornwall

Derek Jenkins is a former teacher and retired artist known primarily for his paintings of Cornish landscapes and paintings of striped pebbles found on beaches throughout the county. His best known work is 'South from Cape Cornwall' which was exhibited in the Tate.

He was born in Cardiff, Wales c. 1937. He went on to study art at the West of England College of Art in Bristol, United Kingdom. He completed his teaching diploma at the London University. In 1972 he moved from London to Truro, Cornwall where he was the Head of the Art Department at Falmouth School of Art for 17 years.

After his retirement from teaching in 1989, he pursued his own artistic works, which have been exhibited in the Tate St Ives and locally, in Falmouth and St Ives art galleries. He was a member of the Newlyn Society of Artists during their centenary year and was a member of the Penwith Society of Artists. He retired from painting in 2005, aged 68.
