= List of St Ives artists =

A list of St Ives artists, artists who have lived in the town of St Ives in Cornwall, southwest England, is as follows:

== 19th century ==
- John Noble Barlow
- Howard Russell Butler
- Thomas Millie Dow
- Elizabeth Forbes (artist)
- Sydney Laurence
- Mary McCrossan
- Albert Julius Olsson
- Richard Short
- Edward Simmons (painter)
- Adrian Scott Stokes
- Marianne Stokes
- Algernon Talmage
- William Holt Yates Titcomb
- John Reinhard Weguelin
- Anders Zorn

== Early and mid 20th century ==
- Wilhelmina Barns-Graham
- Claude Francis Barry
- Sven Berlin
- Dorothy Bordass
- Charles David Jones Bryant
- Emily Carr
- Stanley Dorfman
- Paul Dougherty (artist)
- Albert Moulton Foweraker
- Leonard Fuller
- Naum Gabo
- Patrick Hayman
- Isobel Heath
- Barbara Hepworth
- Patrick Heron
- Frances Hodgkins
- Faust Lang
- Peter Lanyon
- Bernard Leach (potter)
- Hayley Lever
- John Milne (sculptor)
- Denis Mitchell
- Alice Moore
- Ben Nicholson
- Winifred Nicholson
- Raymond Ray-Jones
- Walter Elmer Schofield
- Robert Borlase Smart
- Dirk Smorenberg
- Brian Wall
- Alfred Wallis
- Frederick Judd Waugh
- John Wells
- Christopher Wood
- Bryan Wynter
- Beatrice Pauline Hewitt

== Late 20th century/ 21st century ==
- Robert Adams (sculptor and designer)
- Ray Atkins
- Wilhelmina Barns-Graham
- Trevor Bell
- Anthony Benjamin
- Sven Berlin
- Sandra Blow
- Bob Crossley
- Yankel Feather
- Paul Feiler
- Terry Frost
- Patrick Heron
- Roger Hilton
- Peter Lanyon
- Alan Lowndes
- Alexander Mackenzie
- Alice Mumford
- Kate Nicholson
- Breon O'Casey
- Tony O'Malley
- Jane O'Malley
- Stass Paraskos
- Bryan Pearce
- William Scott
- Bob Vigg
- Bryan Wynter

== Gallery ==
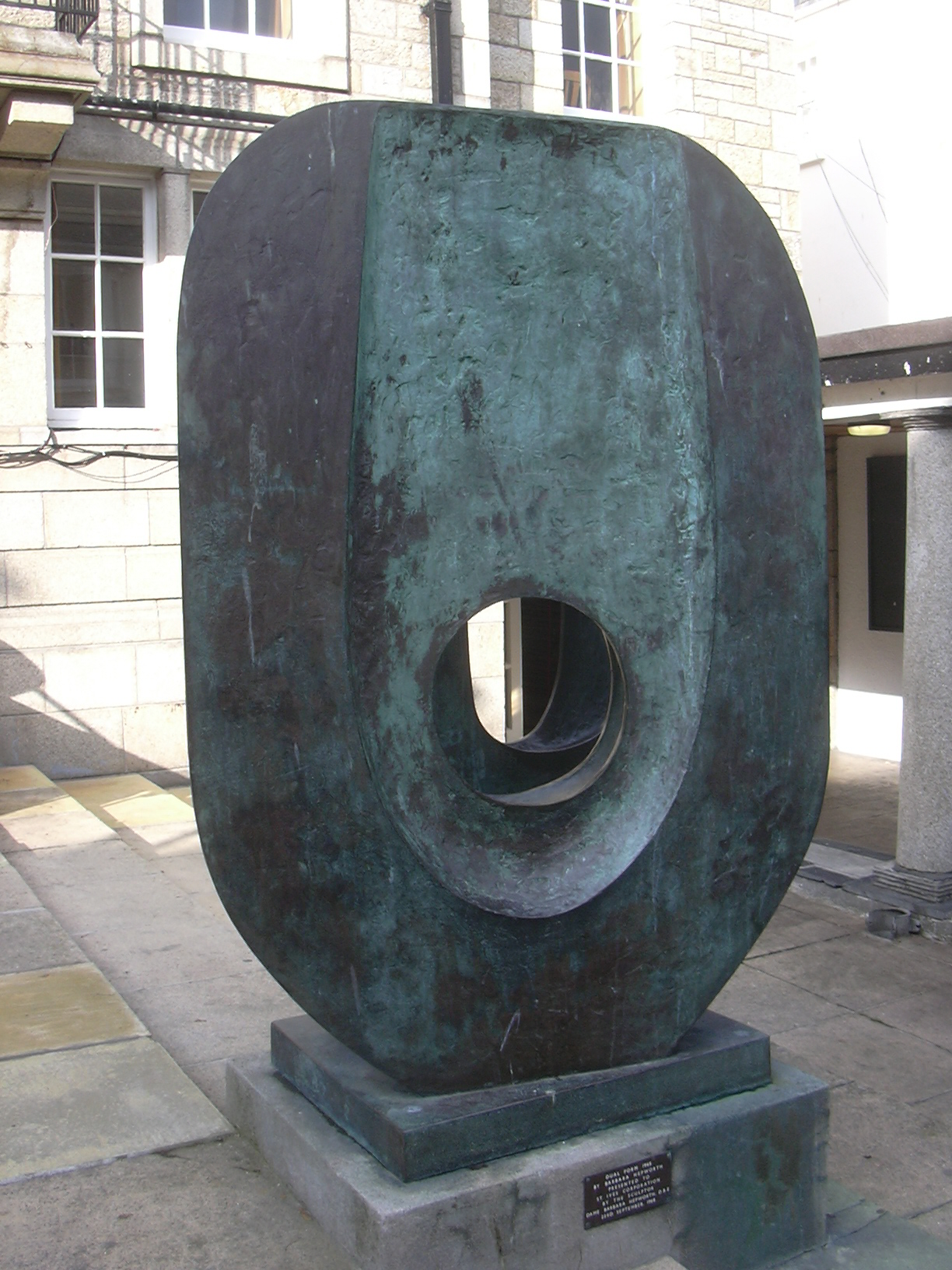
Dual Form by Barbara Hepworth, St Ives Guildhall

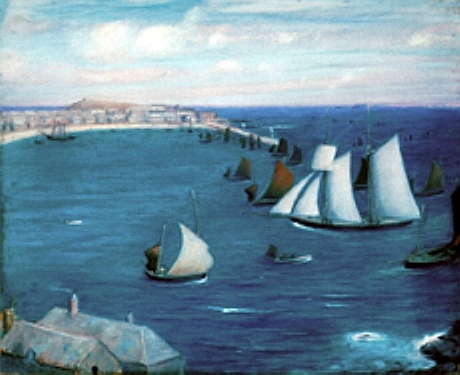
St Ives Harbour by Thomas Millie Dow

== See also ==
- Barbara Hepworth Museum and Sculpture Garden
- Marlow Moss
- St Ives School
- Tate St Ives art gallery
