= Bryan Pearce =

English painter (1929–2007)

Walter Bryan Pearce
- Born: July 25, 192725 July 1929; St Ives, Cornwall, England
- Died: January 11, 2007 (aged 77)11 January 2007; St Ives, Cornwall, England
- Education: St. Ives School of Painting
- Known for: Naïve art, landscape paintings of Cornwall

Walter Bryan Pearce (25 July 1929 – 11 January 2007) was a British painter. He was recognised as one of the UK's leading naïve artists.

== Early life ==
Bryan Pearce was born in St. Ives, Cornwall, which remained his home for the rest of his life. His father, Walter, was a butcher in St Ives, played rugby for Cornwall, and was later mayor of St Ives. His mother, Mary Warmington, was a painter from another local family.

Pearce suffered from the congenital disease phenylketonuria, which affects the normal development of the brain. He attended a special needs school in the 1940s and 1950s and then, encouraged by his mother and, later, by other St. Ives artists, he began drawing and painting in watercolours in 1953 before moving on to oil paint on board and, later, conté crayon. He attended Leonard Fuller's St. Ives School of Painting from 1953 to 1957.

== Artistic career ==
Pearce specialised in paintings of his home town, and the surrounding Penwith area, drawn in typically flat style, with areas of bright colour surrounded by heavy outlines, like stained glass. His learning disabilities gave his art, in the words of Peter Lanyon, an "awareness more direct" than pure observation.

Guided by Denis Mitchell, he joined the Penwith Society of Arts in 1957, and the Newlyn Society of Artists. He had his first solo exhibition at the Newlyn Gallery near Penzance in 1959, and his first solo exhibition in London at the St Martin's Gallery in 1962. Retrospectives were held at various venues from 1966 to 2004, particularly at Penwith Gallery in 1966, the Museum of Modern Art in Oxford in 1975, the Royal Cornwall Museum in Truro in 2000, and the Victoria Art Gallery in Bath in 2004. Examples of his work are held by many public galleries. His business affairs were dealt with first by his family and ultimately by trustees, enabling him to concentrate on his art. In the second half of his career a good deal of his work was produced and sold in the form of prints in relatively small signed, numbered editions. Some of these were small hand-made etchings, with which the artist had a 'hands on' creative involvement; others were full size screenprints made by printer-craftsmen 'after' works in other media. The latter certainly render just over twenty of Pearce's original images, with their pure, expansive areas of specific colours, extremely convincingly. Two of the earliest screenprints, 'St Ives All Round' and 'Newlyn All Round' (both 1976) were printed in black line only. A number of one-colour lithographs also exist.

== Death ==
Pearce died peacefully at home in St Ives on 11 January 2007. His funeral was held at St Ives Parish Church on 22 January 2007. An exhibition was held at the Tate Gallery, St Ives from 3 February - 13 May 2007. It had been planned in retrospective to his death but became a memorial show.

== Paint Collection Information ==
The Bryan Pearce Estate gave a collection of his works from the 1950s to 2006 to the Royal Cornwall Museum. These were shown 17 November 2007 – 5 January 2008, at the Museum. Meanwhile, on 12 March 2008, an auction record for a painting by Bryan Pearce was set at Bonham's New Bond Street Auction Room in London when the work "St Ives Harbour 1" (1965), 20" x 46", realised a hammer price of £28,000 (with commission around £33,500). This record was soon broken as, in the following May, Pearce's largest known oil painting, 'Penzance Harbour (all round)', oil on board 20.5" x 60.5", sold for £39000 (with commission around £47,000) at a Penzance auction house, and was destined for the permanent collection at Penlee House, Penzance. In October 2011, his St. Ives (all round) 1977, oil on board 24" x 45½", exceeded the pre-sale top estimate at Christies three times over, selling for £55250 (including buyer's premium) making it the most expensive Pearce to-date.

Several biographies have been published about Bryan Pearce, including Ruth Jones's The Path of the Son (1976), Marion Whybrow's Bryan Pearce: a private view (1985) and Janet Axten's The Artist and His Work (2004).
