= Alan Lowndes =

British painter (1921–1978)

- Born: 23 February 1921; Heaton Norris, Lancashire, England
- Died: 22 September 1978 (aged 57); Cam, Gloucestershire, England
- Occupation: Painter

Alan Lowndes (23 February 1921 – 22 September 1978) was a British painter known primarily for his scenes of northern life. He also spent time in St Ives, and he was a close friend of many of the St Ives School artists.

== Life ==
Lowndes was born in Heaton Norris, Lancashire, a suburb of Stockport in 1921, the fourth child of Samuel Lowndes, a railway clerk, and his wife Helen Morrey (died 1924) from Kilmarnock. He left school at 14, and was apprenticed to a decorator.

During the Second World War Lowndes saw active service in South-west Asia and Italy. After the war he studied painting at night school, but was largely self-taught. He began to achieve success in the late 1950s and early 1960s in the period when northern writers such as Stan Barstow, John Braine and Alan Sillitoe were also coming to the fore.

== Work ==
Lowndes had one man exhibitions in Manchester, London and New York and is represented in many public collections. Although often compared to L. S. Lowry, he is considered by Terry Frost to be a greater painter. Alan Lowndes died in Gloucestershire in 1978.

Grayson Perry selected work by Lowndes for his Unpopular Culture exhibition (2008).

In 2021, the centenary of Lowndes’ birth was marked by an exhibition at the Crane Kalman Gallery, London. In reviewing this exhibition David Nowell Smith of the University of East Anglia said "It's time for Alan Lowndes to emerge from L.S. Lowry’s shadow".

== See also ==
- List of St. Ives artists
