= John Milne (sculptor) =

John Milne (1931–1978) was an English abstract sculptor who worked mainly in bronze and wood but also aluminium and stone. A prominent member of the St Ives group of artists, he was a pupil and worked as an assistant to Barbara Hepworth for two years.

== Biography ==
Born in Eccles, Lancashire, in 1931 Milne studied electrical engineering at the Salford Royal Technical College in 1945, then transferred to the art school at the College, specialising in sculpture, until 1951. In the following year he attended the Académie de la Grande Chaumière, in Paris. For two years he was then a pupil of the sculptor Barbara Hepworth and her assistant, along with amongst others, the sculptor Denis Mitchell. Although some of Hepworth’s assistants later moved away from her style, Milne’s work continued to bear some relation to it. In 1956, he purchased Trewyn House, a large property in St Ives, next to Hepworth's studio (her studio had once been an outbuilding of his house), which provided him with studio space and a view to the sea below. Milne from the early 1960s visited Greece regularly, an influence which showed itself in works such as Gnathos, owned by the Tate Gallery. The artist wrote: ‘I often cast works with more than one type of finish in order to be absolutely sure that the final result is the most perfect that I can obtain. I consider the polished bronze of Gnathos as the ultimate fulfilment of my original idea. The Greek word “Gnathos” means “jaw” or “jawbone” which describes my feeling of “biting” or “getting ones teeth into” something, be that something my life or my work—this was the emotion of the sculpture. Gnathos was a complete change of direction in my work at that point (1960). I have since carried out many other sculptures and reliefs which continue this pincer-like feeling amongst which are Totemic II and the relief Icarus'.

Milne participated in many group exhibitions, including with the Penwith Society of Arts and the Newlyn Society of Artists in Cornwall, at Plymouth City Museum and Art Gallery and the Genesis Galleries, New York.

One-man exhibitions included several at Marjorie Parr Gallery (1969 & 1972), Lad Lane Gallery, Dublin, and a retrospective at the Plymouth City Museum and Art Gallery in 1971. His reputation grew and his work was collected and exhibited extensively in the UK and abroad; exhibitions were held in Vancouver in 1974 and, jointly with Denis Mitchell and Enzo Plazzotta, in Saudi Arabia in 1976; several Milne exhibitions were also mounted in the USA. He continued to live and work in St Ives until his death in 1978 at the age of 47. The Belgrave Gallery exhibition in 2000 marked the publication of Peter Davies’s The Sculpture of John Milne.

== Representation in public collections ==
Arts Council of Great Britain.

London Borough of Camden

Manchester Art Gallery

National Galleries of Scotland

Pallant House Gallery, Chichester

Salford Museum & Art Gallery

Tate Gallery

The Whitworth, Manchester

== See also ==
- List of St Ives artists
