= Bob Crossley =

English painter

- Born: 30 August 1912; Northwich, Cheshire, England
- Died: 19 September 2010 (aged 98)
- Education: Manchester Academy of Fine Arts
- Movement: Abstract art
- Spouse: Marjorie Belfield (m. 1938; died 2000)
- Military career
- Allegiance: United Kingdom
- Branch: Royal Air Force
- War: World War II

Bob Crossley (30 August 1912 – 19 September 2010) was an abstract artist who lived in Cornwall, England from 1959. He was still painting at the age of 97. He worked in oil and acrylic, producing paintings influenced, in part, by the modernism of the 1950s.

He was born in Northwich, Cheshire but grew up in Rochdale, the Lancashire town where his father, an engine fitter, worked. He left school at 14 and spent the 1930s working as a coach painter and signwriter and served in the RAF during the Second World War. After demobilisation he attended drawing classes in Manchester and joined the Rochdale Art Society and the Manchester Academy. LS Lowry bought a painting from his first major London show at the Reid Gallery in 1960.

He moved to Cornwall in 1959 and alternated between painting and running a beachside shop in St Ives. In 1960 he became a member of the Penwith Society of Arts and a member of the Newlyn Society of Artists a year later, his election supported by his friend Terry Frost. He painted from the 1970s in a large Porthmeor studio within the long-established artists' complex with views directly onto Porthmeor beach.

His last solo exhibition was at the Belgrave Gallery in St Ives in 2009, when he was 97.

He married Marjorie Belfield in 1938. They had two daughters and one son. Marjorie died in 2000.
