= Alfred Wallis =

English painter (1855–1942)

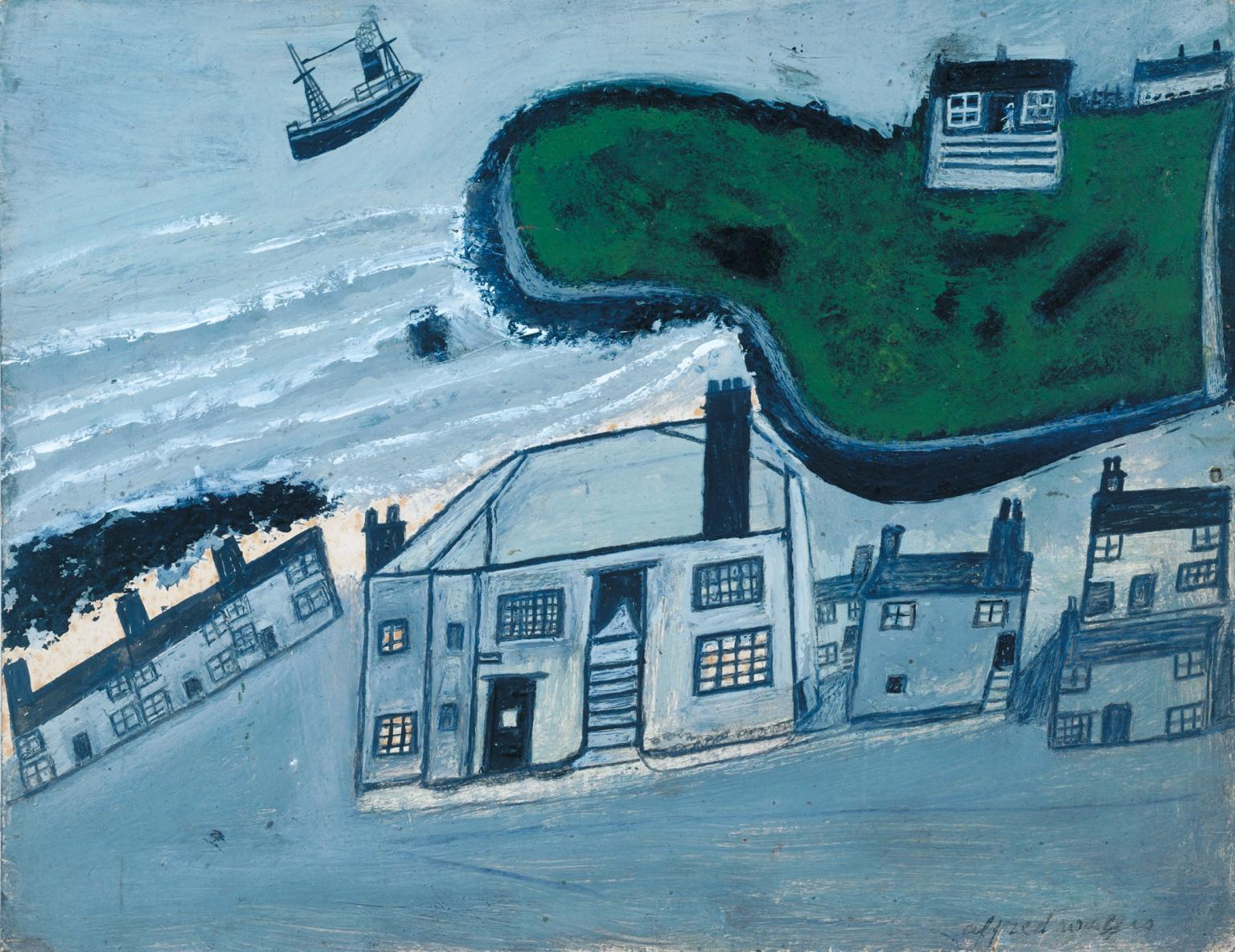
- The Hold House Port Mear Square Island Port Mear Beach, c. 1932, Tate Gallery
- Born: 8 August 1855; Devonport, Plymouth, England
- Died: 29 August 1942 (aged 87); Madron workhouse, near Penzance, Cornwall, England
- Resting place: Barnoon Cemetery, St Ives; 50.213445°N 5.484258°W
- Occupations: Artist; Fisherman; Marine stores dealer
- Style: Naïve
- Spouse: Susan Ward

Alfred Wallis (8 August 1855 – 29 August 1942) was a British artist and marine stores dealer. He began painting at the age of 70, in 1925, using household paint on scraps of cardboard. Having lived by the sea all his life, and no artistic training, he painted port landscapes and shipping scenes in a naïve style. He achieved little commercial success, although his work was championed by progressive artists such as Ben Nicholson and Christopher Wood.

== Life and work ==
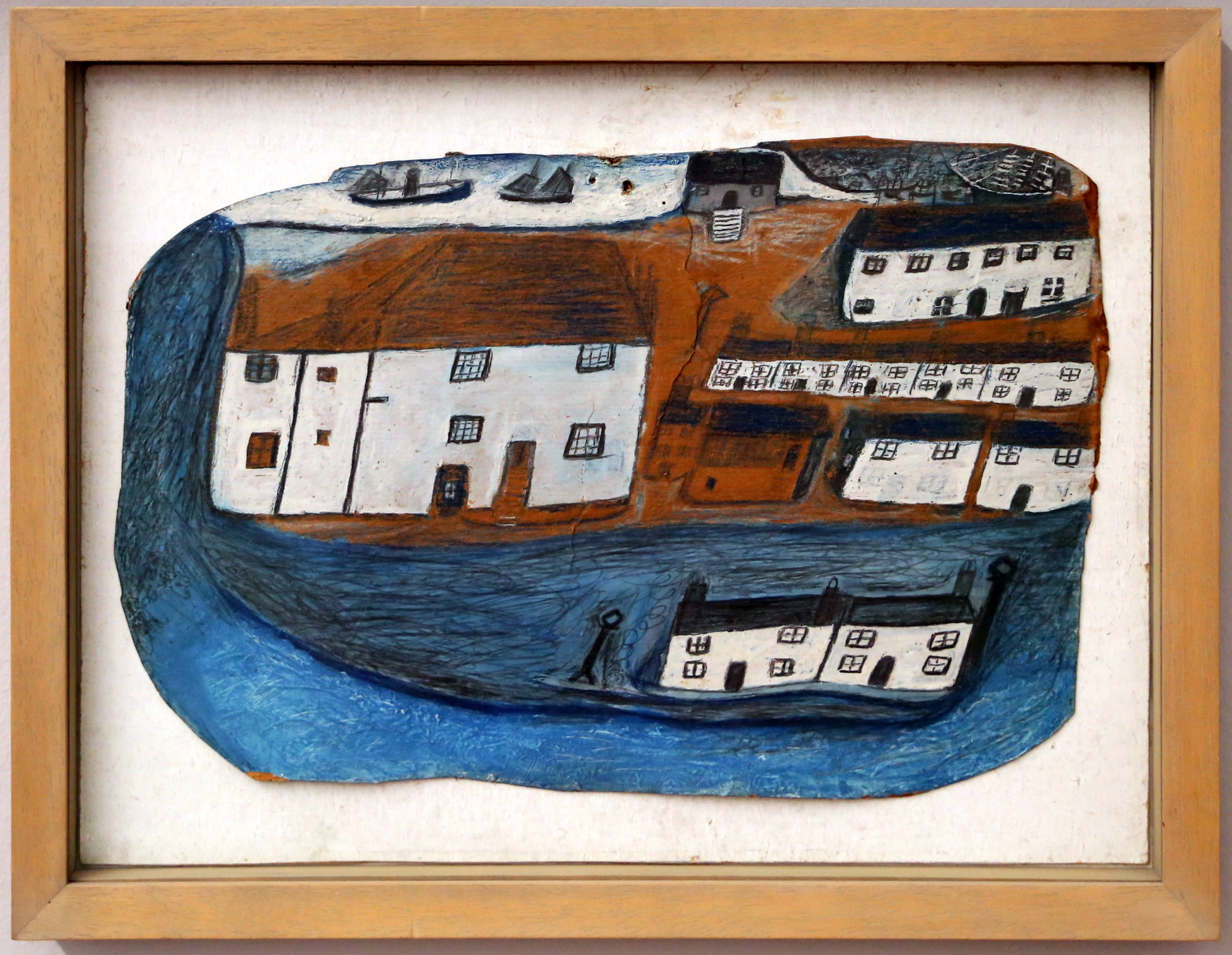
St Ives, c. 1928

Wallis's father, Charles Wallis, was from Penzance in Cornwall, and his mother, Jane Ellis, was from the Isles of Scilly. They moved to Devonport, Plymouth, in 1848, to find work and had 13 children there in extremely impoverished conditions. Alfred and his brother Charles were born there and were the only children to survive. His birth certificate shows he was born on 8 August 1855.

After Wallis's mother Jane died of tuberculosis in 1866, his father returned to Penzance with Wallis and his brother. It is not known if Wallis went to school at Penzance but in 1871, when he was 15, he was apprenticed to a basketmaker, his father's cousin William Wallis. Alfred then worked on the Mount's Bay fishing fleet out of Newlyn, sailing on distinctive boats called luggers. He married Susan Ward in St Mary's Church, Penzance, in 1876, when he was 20 and Susan was 41. He became stepfather to her five children, George, Albert, Emily, Jessie and Jacob.

Wallis became a mariner in the Merchant Navy that same year, sailing on schooners across the North Atlantic between Penzance and Newfoundland, which enabled him to earn a good wage. In August 1876 Wallis sailed to a remote part of Labrador called Batteau Harbour, where he spent several months and acted as ship's cook.

Wallis's ship, the Belle Aventure, encountered a storm on the return to Penzance in October 1876 and the crew survived only by jettisoning part of the cargo of dried cod overboard. While he was away at sea, his first child, Alfred Charles, died at just a few weeks old. On Wallis's return he took up offshore fishing for a year, but following the early death of his second child, Ellen Jane, he switched to labouring in Penzance.

The family moved to St Ives, Cornwall, in 1882 where Wallis ran a marine stores business, buying scrap iron, sails, rope and other items on behalf of his employer Joseph Denley. In the late 1890s Wallis took over the business himself until 1912, when he and Susan retired to a little terraced house in Back Road West. Wallis and Susan were staunch followers of the Salvation Army, and Wallis kept busy with odd jobs for a local antiques dealer, Andrew Armour, which provided him with some insight into the world of objets d'art.

Following Susan's death in 1922, Wallis took up painting, as he later told Ben Nicholson, "for company because his wife had died and he did not care for the rest of the company in St Ives". He was self-taught, and never had an art lesson.

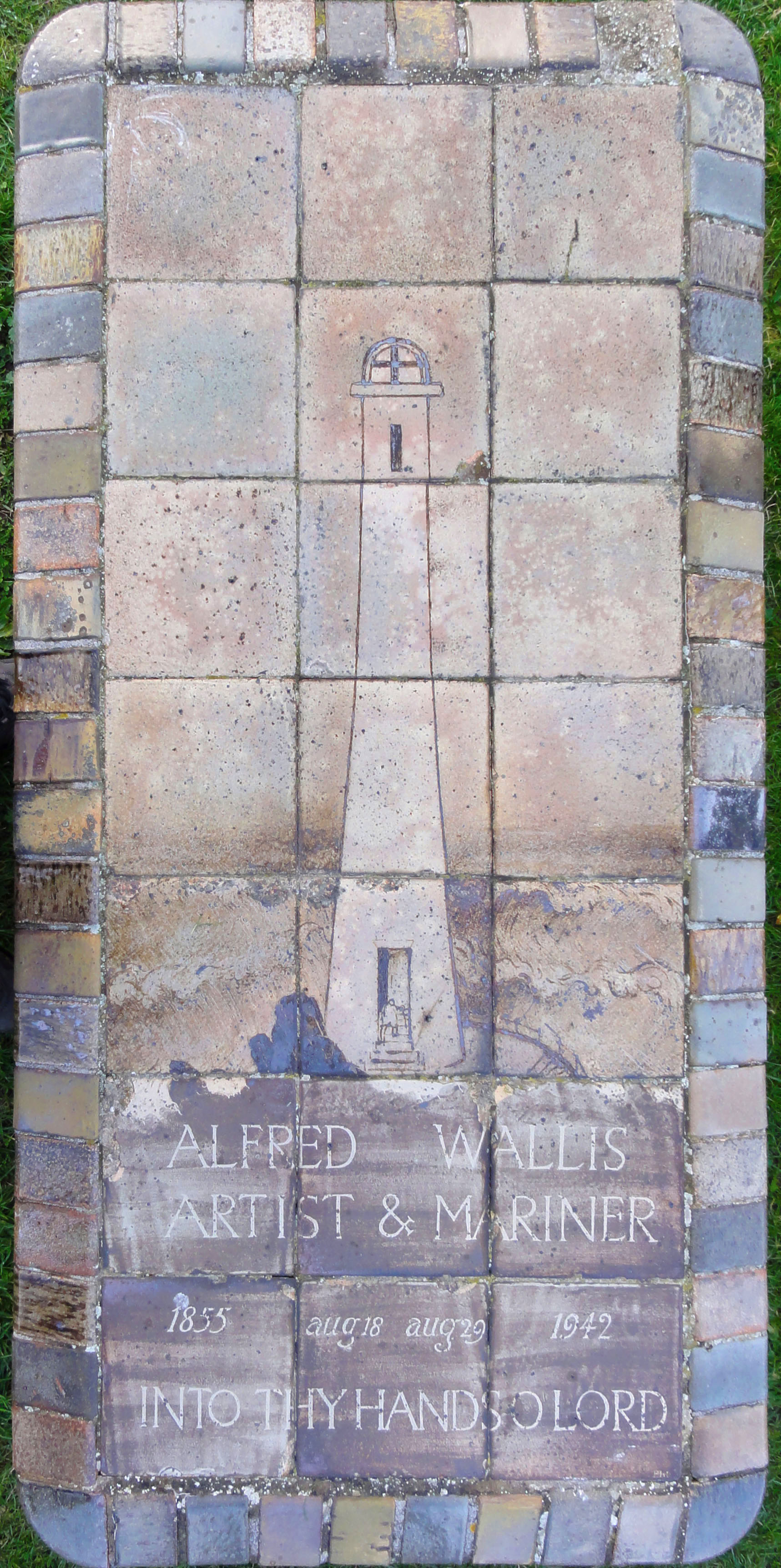
Wallis's grave in St Ives decorated in the style of his paintings by Bernard Leach

His paintings are an example of naïve art; perspective is ignored and an object's scale is often based on its relative importance in the scene, giving many of his paintings a resemblance to early maps. Wallis painted seascapes from memory, in large part because the world of sail and steamships he knew was being replaced by vessels with diesel engines. As he put it, his subjects were "what use To Bee out of my own memery what we may never see again..."

Wallis had little money and used materials that were readily available, mostly painting on cardboard torn from packing boxes and using a limited palette of paint. However, close examination of the different types of cardboard he used, and the specific brand of Peacock & Buchan ships paint he insisted on (bought from the Burrells' hardware shop in the Digey), suggests that these were conscious artistic choices.

Wallis painted as a hobby for three years until, in August 1928, he sold some of his paintings to two young modern artists Ben Nicholson and Christopher Wood, who were visiting St Ives for the day. They returned with their partners and stayed for several weeks, often visiting Wallis and buying more of his paintings. They were delighted by Wallis and celebrated his direct approach to image-making. Nicholson commented later that "to Wallis, his paintings were never 'paintings' but actual events". Wallis was propelled into a circle of some of the most progressive artists working in Britain in the 1930s.

The influence, however, was all one way; Wallis continued to paint as he always had. Nicholson later termed Wallis's art "something that has grown out of the Cornish seas and earth and which will endure".

Through Nicholson and Wood, Wallis's work was introduced to Jim Ede who promoted his work in London. Despite the admiration of some of the foremost artists, critics and collectors in the British Modern Art scene throughout the 1930s – as well as international acclaim – Wallis's paintings were only ever bought for a few shillings. Wallis continued to live in poverty until he was taken, destitute and gravely ill, to Madron workhouse near Penzance in July 1941.

After his death on 29 August 1942, his family funeral at Barnoon Cemetery was interrupted part-way through by his admirers, who then organised a private grave and second funeral, described as "a queer little ceremony". Wallis's grave lay bare and unmarked for a year and a half until the potter Bernard Leach suggested he make a set of decorative tiles to cover it. Thus Leach created a beautifully unique and fitting memorial, depicting an old man at the foot of a lighthouse – a popular nautical motif in Wallis's paintings. His grave can still be seen today, overlooking Porthmeor beach and Tate St Ives.

Wallis thought his neighbours resented his fame, and that they believed him to be secretly rich. In one of his last letters, to Ede, he wrote:

i am thinkin of givin up The paints all to gether i have nothin But Persecution and gelecy [jealousy] and if you can com [come] down for an hour or 2 you can take them with you and give what they are worf [worth] afterwards. These drawers and shopes are all jealous of me.

— Alfred Wallis letter to Jim Ede 27 July 1938

Examples of Wallis's paintings can be seen at Tate St Ives and Kettle's Yard in Cambridge (Jim Ede's home).

In October 2020, an exhibition titled "Alfred Wallis Rediscovered" opened at Kettle's Yard.

From 21 November 2026 – 2 May 2027, Pallant House Gallery exhibited Alfred Wallis: An Artists’'Artist which displayed "his lasting influence on modernist approaches to perspective, form, colour and composition, while celebrating a body of work that remains entirely unique."

== See also ==
- List of St Ives artists
