= Alice Mumford =

British painter (born 1965)

Alice Mumford is a Colombia-born painter born in 1965.

== Biography ==
Mumford attended Dartington Hall School between 1978 and 1982 before studying at Southwark College of Art and Design in London until 1984. She studied at the Camberwell School of Arts and Crafts from 1984 to 1987 and enrolled for a master's degree at Falmouth College of Art in 1995. Mumford lives and works in Cornwall and teaches life drawing and painting at St Ives School of Painting and is an Academician of the Royal West of England Academy. Professor Richard Demarco has said of her work "I delight in the mark-making of Alice Mumford. Her brush strokes animate the surface of paper, canvas and board." Mumford often uses reflected images in her paintings, painting the mirror image of an object rather than the object itself to create a sense of space. Mumford has featured in a number of group exhibitions at the Rainyday Gallery in Penzance from 1996 and at the Covent Garden Gallery in 1988 and at the Great Atlantic Map Works in St Just during 1999. Solo shows included one at Cobra & Bellamy in 2001 and at Julian Lax in 2003. In 2018 Mumford won the David Simon Contemporary Award at the 165th Annual Open Exhibition of the Royal West of England Academy.

== See also ==
- List of St. Ives artists
