= Maurice Sumray =

English painter

- Born: 26 December 1920; London, England
- Died: 21 July 2004, (age 83); Carbis Bay, St Ives, Cornwall, England
- Education: Goldsmiths, University of London
- Known for: Painting, Engraving
- Movement: figurative

Maurice Sumray (1920–2004) was an English artist and engraver, based in St Ives, Cornwall. Sumray was described by Wyndham Lewis in The Listener as one of the "best artists in England".

Major retrospective exhibitions of his work were displayed at the Penwith Gallery, St Ives in 1984, and the Falmouth Art Gallery in 1997,
