= Richard Short (artist) =

British painter

Richard Short (29 December 1841, St Ives, Cornwall – 16 December 1919) was a Cornish artist.

His grandfather, John Tregerthen Short, was a master mariner who had also started his own Navigation School in St Ives.

Richard later moved to Cardiff. In 1900 he published a historical novel, Saronia: A Romance of Ancient Ephesus. However, by 1901 he had established himself as an artist, specialising in maritime scenes. His works include scenes of Penarth, Cardiff, the Bosphoros and Corsica.

Amgueddfa Cymru – Museum Wales holds five works by Richard Short.
