= Patrick Heron =

English artist (1920-1999)

Patrick Heron CBE
- 'Red Garden Painting: 3–5 June 1985', oil on canvas, 208x335 cm
- Born: 30 January 1920; Headingley, Leeds, Yorks, UK
- Died: 20 March 1999 (aged 79); Zennor, Cornwall, UK
- Known for: Painting
- Spouse: Delia Reiss

Patrick Heron CBE (30 January 1920 – 20 March 1999) was a British abstract and figurative artist, critic, writer, and polemicist, who lived in Zennor, Cornwall.

Heron was recognised as one of the leading painters of his generation. Influenced by Cézanne, Matisse, Braque and Bonnard, Heron made a significant contribution to the dissemination of modernist ideas of painting through his critical writing and primarily his art.

Heron's artworks are most noted for his exploration and use of colour and light. He is known for both his early figurative work and non-figurative works, which over the years looked to explore further the idea of making all areas of the painting of equal importance. His work was exhibited widely throughout his career and while he wrote regularly early in his career, notably for New Statesman and Arts New York, this continued periodically in later years.

== Personal life ==
Born 30 January 1920 at Headingley, Leeds in Yorkshire, Patrick Heron was the eldest child of Thomas Milner Heron and Eulalie Mabel (née Davies). When Patrick Heron was five and his brother Michael (later known as Dom Benedict) was 4 the family moved to Cornwall, where Tom joined Alec Walker at Cryséde to manage and expand the business from artist-designed woodblock prints on silk to include garment-making and retail. The whole family, now four children (Joanna born 1926 and Antony Giles born 1928), moved again in 1929 to Welwyn Garden City where Tom established Cresta Silks. Notable designers including Edward McKnight Kauffer and Wells Coates, Paul Nash and Cedric Morris worked with Cresta, and Patrick also created fabric designs for the firm from his teenage years. At school, Patrick Heron met his future wife, Delia, daughter of Celia and Richard Reiss, a director of the company which founded Welwyn Garden City.

Registered as a conscientious objector in World War II, Heron worked as an agricultural labourer in Cambridgeshire before he was signed off for ill health. He returned to Cornwall to work for Bernard Leach at the Leach Pottery, St Ives, in 1944–45. During this time, he met many leading artists of the St Ives School, including Barbara Hepworth and Ben Nicholson. Reacquainted with Cornwall, Heron spent each summer there until it became his permanent home in 1956 after his purchase and refurbishment of Eagles Nest the year before from Mark Arnold-Forster, a house Heron had lived in during his childhood. He spent the rest of his life here, until he died at home in March 1999.

Patrick and Delia married in 1945 and had two daughters: architect and educator Katharine (1947) and sculptor Susanna (1949).

Heron was appointed a CBE in 1977 under Harold Wilson, but rejected a knighthood under Margaret Thatcher.

== Career as a painter ==
Heron used that most rare and uncanny of gifts: the ability to invent an imagery that was unmistakably his own, and yet which connects immediately with the natural world as we perceive it, and transforms our vision of it. Like those of his acknowledged masters, Braque, Matisse and Bonnard, his paintings are at once evocations and celebrations of the visible, discoveries of what he called "the reality of the eye".

Heron's early works were strongly influenced by artists including Matisse, Bonnard, Braque and Cézanne. Throughout his career, Heron worked in a variety of media, from the silk scarves he designed for his father's company Cresta from the age of 14, to a stained-glass window for Tate St Ives, but he was foremost a painter working in oils and gouache.

=== Early years ===
Heron first saw the paintings of Cézanne at an exhibition at the National Gallery in 1933, an influence which continued throughout his career. Having seen The Red Studio by Matisse (one of his other significant influences) at the Redfern Gallery in 1943, Heron completed The Piano, which he considered to be his first mature work. His first solo exhibition was held in 1947 at the Redfern Gallery, London. That same year, Heron began a series of portraits of T. S. Eliot, one of which was acquired by the National Portrait Gallery in 1966. In 2013 this highly abstracted portrait was the centre of an exhibition at the gallery, displayed for the first time alongside a selection of Heron's original studies from life and memory from which it was produced.

=== From 1956 ===
Heron's permanent move to Eagles Nest above the Cornish village of Zennor in 1956 coincided with his commitment to non-figurative painting and resulted in a very productive period of his work. Its roots can be seen in the Space in Colour exhibition held at Hanover Gallery, London in 1953 where the works of Heron and nine of his British contemporaries were displayed, which he both curated and wrote the catalogue for. His Tachiste paintings made reference to the garden at Eagles Nest, such as Azalea Garden, in the Tate collection.

His 'Stripe' paintings, described by Alan Bowness as being 'suffused with light and colour and full of a positive life-enhancing quality so free and so refreshing' emphasised this move towards the principles of colour. Writing in 1968, Bowness went on to describe how he could 'think of few more disconcerting paintings in the last twenty years than Heron's stripe paintings of 1957'. (Note: Alan Bowness "On Patrick Heron's Stripe Paintings", in Bowness (1968), reprinted in Gooding (1998, pp. 135–136)) Heron described how the 'vertical touch' of the Tachiste paintings were pushed to the ultimate conclusion, as the lines "became longer and longer, until on one painting in early 1956 they became so long that the strokes touched top and bottom". From 1958 onwards, Heron was represented by Waddington Galleries in London, and in the 1960s he was also represented by the Bertha Schaefer Gallery in New York. When Ben Nicholson moved to Switzerland in 1958, Heron took over his studio at Porthmeor Studios, overlooking the beach at Porthmeor, St Ives, and began to take advantage of the larger space to paint at a bigger scale – first soft-edged and then the self-described "wobbly hard-edge painting", (Note: The phrase first appeared in print in Heron's article ‘Colour in my paintings : 1969’) such as Cadmium with Violet, Scarlet, Emerald, Lemon and Venetian: 1969 in the Tate. He won the John Moores Painting Prize in 1959 with Black Painting, Red, Brown and Olive, 1959.

=== From 1979 ===
The shock of Delia's unexpected death in 1979 meant Heron did little painting for some time. When he did return to the canvas, he turned to the garden at Eagles Nest. Just as it had shown a route to abstraction when Heron first moved there in the 1950s, through it he found a way to reinvigorate his creative approach: rather than rapidly drawing large shapes in pen across the canvas which would then be filled in with a fine Japanese watercolour brush as he had through most of the 1970s, Heron used a large brush, mixed different colours together, and painted from the arm rather than the wrist, allowing the works to develop through the act of painting. This burst of creativity, resulting in paintings such as 28 January: 1983 (Mimosa), formed Heron's Barbican exhibition of 1985.

In 1989 Heron was invited to be artist-in-residence at the museum of New South Wales in Sydney, and this resulted in another highly prolific period of his work. Drawing inspiration from his daily walk to his studio through the city's Botanic Gardens located by the harbour, Heron produced six large paintings and 46 gouaches in sixteen weeks. These works are reactions to real visual experiences, yet are not direct representations; instead the line and colour encapsulate "specific visual realities without ever depicting them".

These intense periods of activity characterised Heron's later career, made obvious through his exhibitions at the Barbican, and another at Camden Arts Centre in 1994. Taking advantage of the space of the centre, Heron created a series of paintings of grand proportions – at 6 feet 6 inches (2.0 m) and ranging from 11 to 17 feet (3.35 to 5.18 m) long, they were conceived with Camden Arts Centre's galleries in mind. These paintings formed the exhibition entitled 'Big Paintings' that went on to tour Britain. The year before, Heron designed a coloured glass window for the new Tate St Ives with his son-in-law Julian Feary, which opened in 1993. Heron was commissioned to paint a portrait of author AS Byatt (1997), and the following year Tate Gallery, London staged a major retrospective of his work in 1998. This was the most comprehensive exhibition of Heron's work and brought together items from the different decades and periods of his working life. Selected by David Sylvester, the works were displayed so that the last gallery with his late paintings adjoined the first gallery with his earliest works, making explicit how the elements on which Heron's career was founded were already in place. Nicholas Serota, former director of the Tate Gallery, who was a friend as well as patron, described Heron as "one of the most influential figures in post-war British art".

Once the exhibition closed, at the Tate Gallery, London, Heron embarked on a series of 100 gouache paintings, each no bigger than A4. He stopped at 43rd, the number it took to cover the carpet in his sitting room at Eagles Nest.

== Career as a critic ==
Naturally I like the article [in the New English Weekly] very much indeed – but not only because what you say about my work pleases me, but also because it is criticism that could only come from someone who has practised himself – and responded to the work in the way it was done. Henry Moore

Dear Mr Heron, I have translated certain sections of your book on paintings which I have read with interest. You throw a new light on those things about which run-of-the-mill criticism is bewildering. My sincere compliments, Georges Braque

Heron was highly acclaimed as a writer as well as an artist, and respected by his contemporaries for being able to articulate art from the perspective of a practitioner. His writing about art began in 1945 when he was invited by Philip Mairet, editor of The New English Weekly, to contribute to the journal. His first published article, on Ben Nicholson, was written while Heron was still at Leach Pottery. This was soon followed by essays on Picasso, Klee, Cézanne and Braque. Within the next two years Heron began broadcasting a series of talks on contemporary art on the BBC World Service and the newly founded Third programme, and wrote regularly for New Statesman. In 1955, he became London Correspondent to Arts Digest, New York (later renamed Arts(NY)), and in the same year a selection of his criticism was published by Routledge as The Changing Forms of Art. In 1958, Heron took a "vow of silence" as a critic, giving up his regular columns as he said he wanted to be a painter who wrote, not a writer who paints.

He did continue to contribute to exhibition catalogues, and wrote some key articles. Notably in 1966, 1968 and 1970 he published a series of articles in Studio International questioning the perceived ascendancy of American artists, at the expense of British and Parisian artists. His final essay on the subject was in a closely worded article of some 14,000 words published over a period of three days in The Guardian in October 1974. He also wrote passionately in defence of the independence and autonomy of English Art Schools against their integration into the polytechnic system. Heron's articles and essays have been republished in collected works, such as "Selected Writings by the Artist" in Patrick Heron (Oxford: 1988), Patrick Heron on Art and Education (Leeds: 1996), and The Colour of Colour (Texas: 1979).

== Major solo exhibitions ==
Heron exhibited his work throughout his career. Key solo exhibitions include:

- 1947 The Redfern Gallery, London [First solo exhibition]
- 1952 Wakefield City Art Gallery
- 1960 Bertha Schaefer Gallery, New York
- 1960 The Waddington Galleries, London
- 1963 Galerie Charles Lienhard, Zurich
- 1965 Hume Tower, Edinburgh
- 1965 VIII Biennal de São Paulo: Gra-Bretanha 1965: Museu de Arte Moderna de São Paulo
- 1967 The Richard Demarco Gallery, Edinburgh
- 1968 Museum of Modern Art, Oxford
- 1972 Whitechapel Art Gallery
- 1973 Bonython Art Gallery, Paddington, Sydney, NSW
- 1978 The University of Texas Art Museum, Austin, Texas
- 1985 Barbican Art Gallery
- 1990 Art Gallery of New South Wales, Sydney
- 1994 Camden Arts Centre
- 1998 Tate Britain
- 2018 Tate St Ives
- 2018 Turner Contemporary
- 2021 Hazlitt Holland-Hibbert
- 2022 Cristea Roberts Gallery

== See also ==
- List of St Ives artists

== Sources ==
- "Encyclopedia of Visual Artists | Patrick Heron: Abstract Expressionist Painter, St Ives School". www.visual-arts-cork.com. 2012. Archived from the original on 1 Jun 2012.
- Bell, Gordon; Heron, Patrick (1996). Patrick Heron on Art and Education. Leeds: University College Bretton Hall / People Express. ISBN 978-0952469353.
- Berriman, Hazel (1993). Cryséde: The Unique Textile Designs of Alec Walker. Truro: Royal Institution of Cornwall. ISBN 978-1871294019.
- Bowness, Alan (May 1968). Patrick Heron: A Retrospective Exhibition of Paintings 1957–1966. Oxford: Museum of Modern Art.
- Braintree District Council (2014). Silver End Conservation Area Appraisal June 2014. p. 11. Archived from the original on 12 Nov 2018.
- Buder, Stanley (1990). Visionaries and Planners: The Garden City Movement and the Modern Community. OUP. ISBN 978-0195061741.
- "Exhibition: Patrick Heron 'Big Paintings 1994'". Camden Arts Centre. 1994. Archived from the original on 12 Nov 2018.
- Cantacuzino, Sherban (1978), Wells Coates: a monograph, Gordon Fraser
- Checkland, Sarah Jane (2000). Ben Nicholson: The Vicious Circles of His Life and Art. John Murray. ISBN 978-0719554568.
- Cole, Ina (2012). "Art review: Patrick Heron: The Colour Magician". Art Times (September / October): 5. Archived from the original on 7 Oct 2012.
- Feary, Julian; Tooby, Michael (1999). Colour in Space: Patrick Heron – Public Projects. St Ives: Tate. ISBN 978-1854372970.
- Gayford, Martin (2021), "Patrick Heron : The Colour of Colour", The Colour of Colour: 1965-1977 (Exhibition catalogue), Hazlitt Holland-Hibbert
- Gooding, Mel (1995). Patrick Heron. Phaidon Press. ISBN 978-0714834443.
- Gooding, Mel, ed. (1998). Painter as Critic, Patrick Heron: Selected Writings. Tate Gallery. ISBN 978-1854372581.
- Gooding, Mel (2004). Patrick Heron. OUP. doi:10.1093/ref:odnb/71796. (Subscription, Wikipedia Library access or UK public library membership required.)
- Heron, T.M.; Davies, P.T. (1929–1934), Sixty letters from T.M. Heron, Managing Director, and fifteen from P.T. Davies, Director, Cresta Silks Ltd, to Paul Nash., 1929 - 1934. Correspondence and papers of Paul Nash and his wife Margaret., Tate Archive, GB 70 TGA 7050/476-562
- Heron, Patrick (Dec 1969). "Colour in my Painting". Studio International: 204–205.
- McNay, Michael (22 Mar 1999). "The colour of genius". The Guardian. Archived from the original on 8 May 2014.
- McNay, Michael (2002). Patrick Heron. St Ives Artists. Tate. ISBN 978-1854373106.
- "Patrick Heron: Studies for a portrait of T.S. Eliot - National Portrait Gallery". www.npg.org.uk. 2013 [1949]. Archived from the original on 12 Nov 2018.
- Peart-Binns, John Stuart; Heron, A Giles (2001). Rebel and Sage: a biography of Tom Heron 1890–1983. Pentland / Carnegie. ISBN 978-1858218670.
- Reiss, Celia (1961). R. L. Reiss – A Memoir. Archived from the original on 8 Oct 2011.
- Heron, Patrick; Gayford, Martin; Byatt, A S (1998). Sylvester, David (ed.). Patrick Heron. Tate Gallery. ISBN 978-1854372505.
- The Independent, Marc Lopatin (21 Mar 1999). "Patrick Heron, abstract painter, dies aged 79". Archived from the original on 4 Jan 2018.
- "Patrick Heron". Waddington Custot. 2015. Archived from the original on 30 Mar 2016.
- "Patrick Heron Curriculum Vitae" (PDF). Waddington Custot. 2015. Archived (PDF) from the original on 12 Nov 2018.
- Wilson, Andrew (2001). Patrick Heron: Early and Late Garden Paintings. Tate. ISBN 978-1854373540.
- "Patrick Heron: The Colour of Colour, Paintings 1965-1977, Hazlitt Holland-Hibbert, 7 October - 17 December 2021".
- "Patrick Heron, Shaping Colour: Prints 1956 - 1999, Cristea Roberts Gallery, 28 January - 5 March 2022".
