= Newlyn Society of Artists =

Newlyn Society of Artists, often abbreviated to NSA, is an artists association founded in 1896. It is based in Newlyn, Cornwall. It was founded by a group of local artists to organise exhibitions at the new Newlyn Art Gallery built by John Passmore Edwards, its members went on to be known as the 'Newlyn School'. It currently has between 85 - 140 members, who are professional artists who either live in, or have strong connections with the South West. According to their website, the membership is composed of artists working in contemporary media such as painting, sculpture, photography, printmaking, video/digital, site specific and performance art.

The society currently exhibits work at Tremenheere art gallery, among others.

== Notable members ==
- Wilhelmina Barns-Graham
- Lamorna Birch
- Stanhope Forbes
- Terry Frost
- Norman Garstin
- Patrick Heron
- Laura Knight
- Walter Langley
- Peter Lanyon
- Bernard Leach
- Alfred Munnings
- Dod Proctor
- John Wells
