= St Ives, Cornwall =

Town in Cornwall, England

Coordinates: 50.211°N 5.480°W

St Ives: Cornish: Porthia
- Town and civil parish
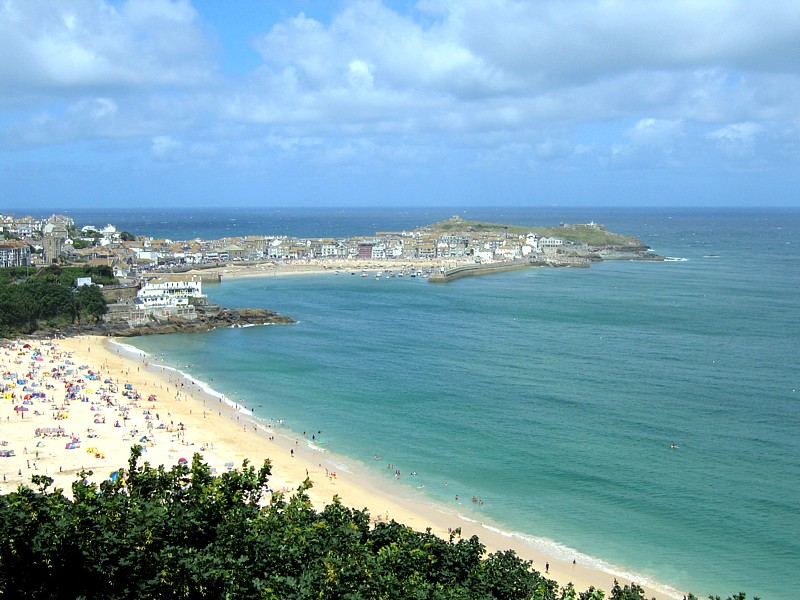
- St Ives Harbour and Porthminster Beach

- Location within Cornwall
- Population: 10,748 (Parish, 2021); 5,410 (Built up area, 2021)
- OS grid reference: SW518403
- Unitary authority: Cornwall
- Ceremonial county: Cornwall
- Region: South West
- Country: England
- Sovereign state: United Kingdom
- Post town: St. Ives
- Postcode district: TR26
- Dialling code: 01736
- Police: Devon and Cornwall
- Fire: Cornwall
- Ambulance: South Western
- UK Parliament: St Ives

St Ives (/sənt ˈaɪvz/; Cornish: Porthia [pɔrθia], meaning "St Ia's cove") is a seaside town, civil parish and port in Cornwall, England, United Kingdom. The town lies north of Penzance and west of Camborne on the coast of the Celtic Sea. In former times, it was commercially dependent on fishing. The decline in fishing, however, caused a shift in commercial emphasis, and the town is now primarily a popular seaside resort. It is notable in achieving the title of Best UK Seaside Town from the British Travel Awards in both 2010 and 2011. It was named best seaside town of 2007 by The Guardian newspaper.

St Ives has become renowned for its number of artists, and is home to the Tate St Ives gallery, among other artistic outlets.

The town was incorporated as a borough in 1639. As well as St Ives itself, the parish also includes Carbis Bay, Lelant and adjoining rural areas. At the 2021 census the population of the parish was 10,748 and the population of the St Ives built up area as defined by the Office for National Statistics was 5,410.

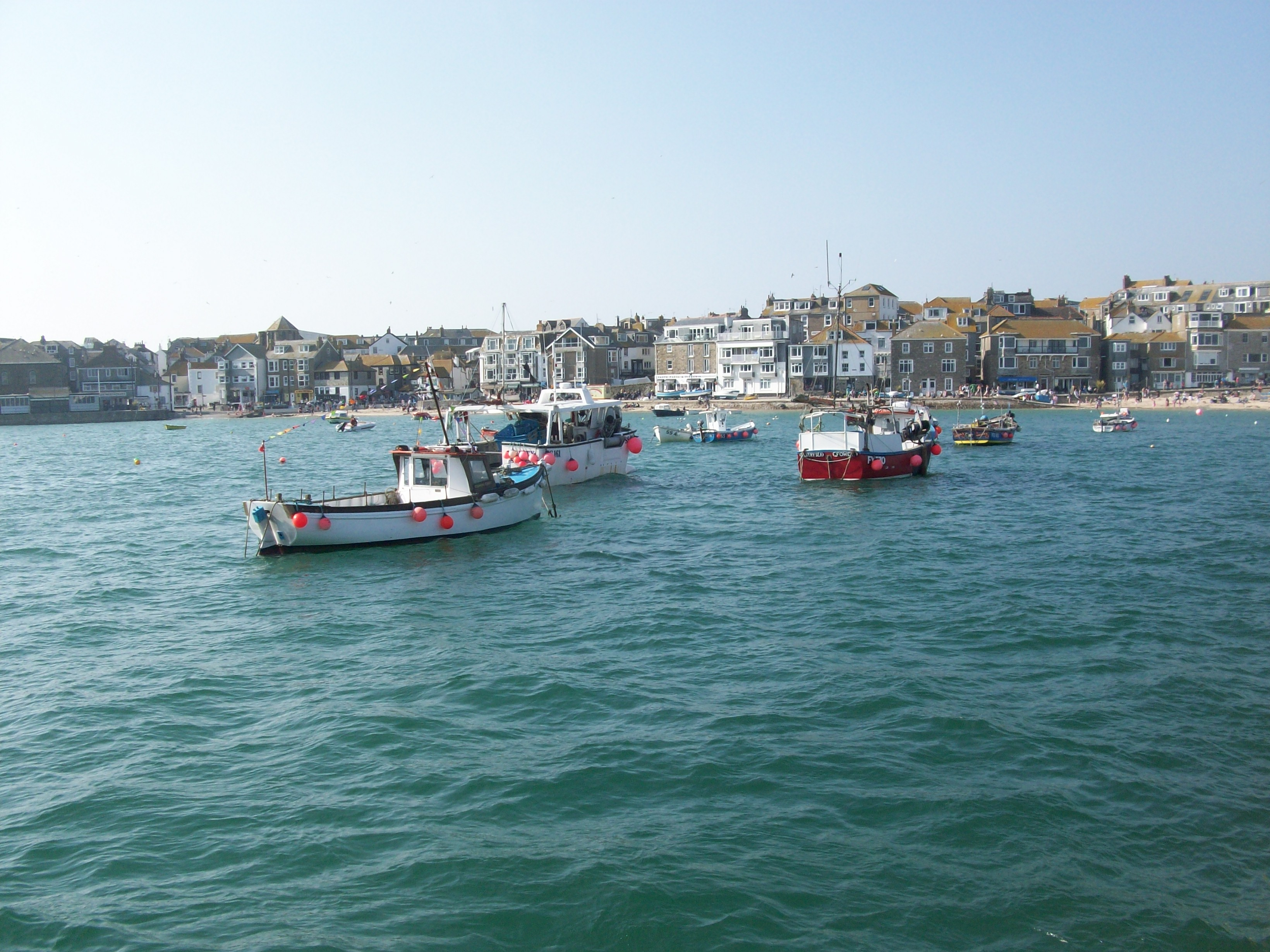
April in St Ives

== History ==
=== Early history ===
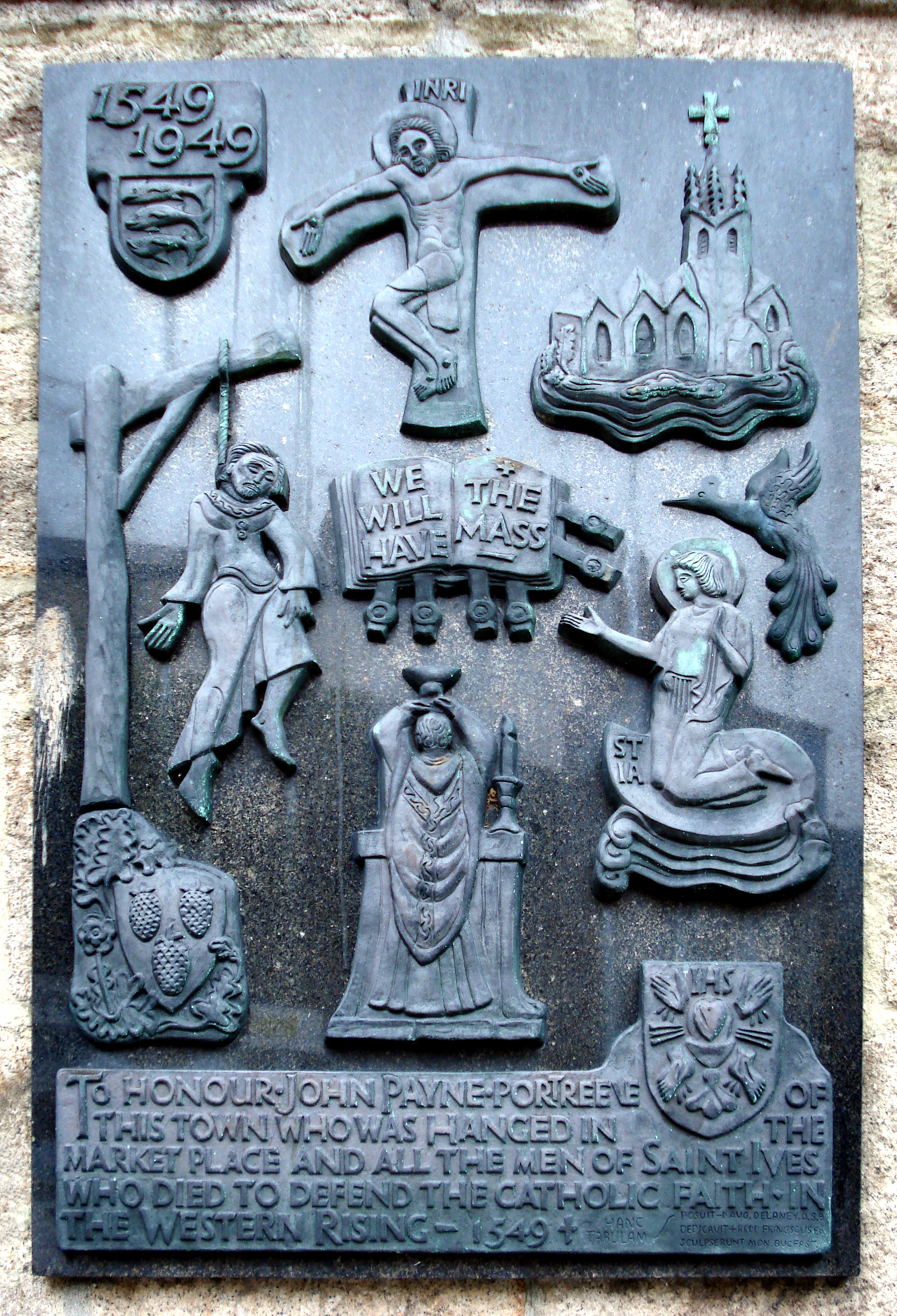
John Payne memorial, St Ives

The origin of St Ives is attributed in legend to the arrival of the Irish saint Ia of Cornwall, in the 5th century. The parish church bears her name, and the name St Ives derives from it.

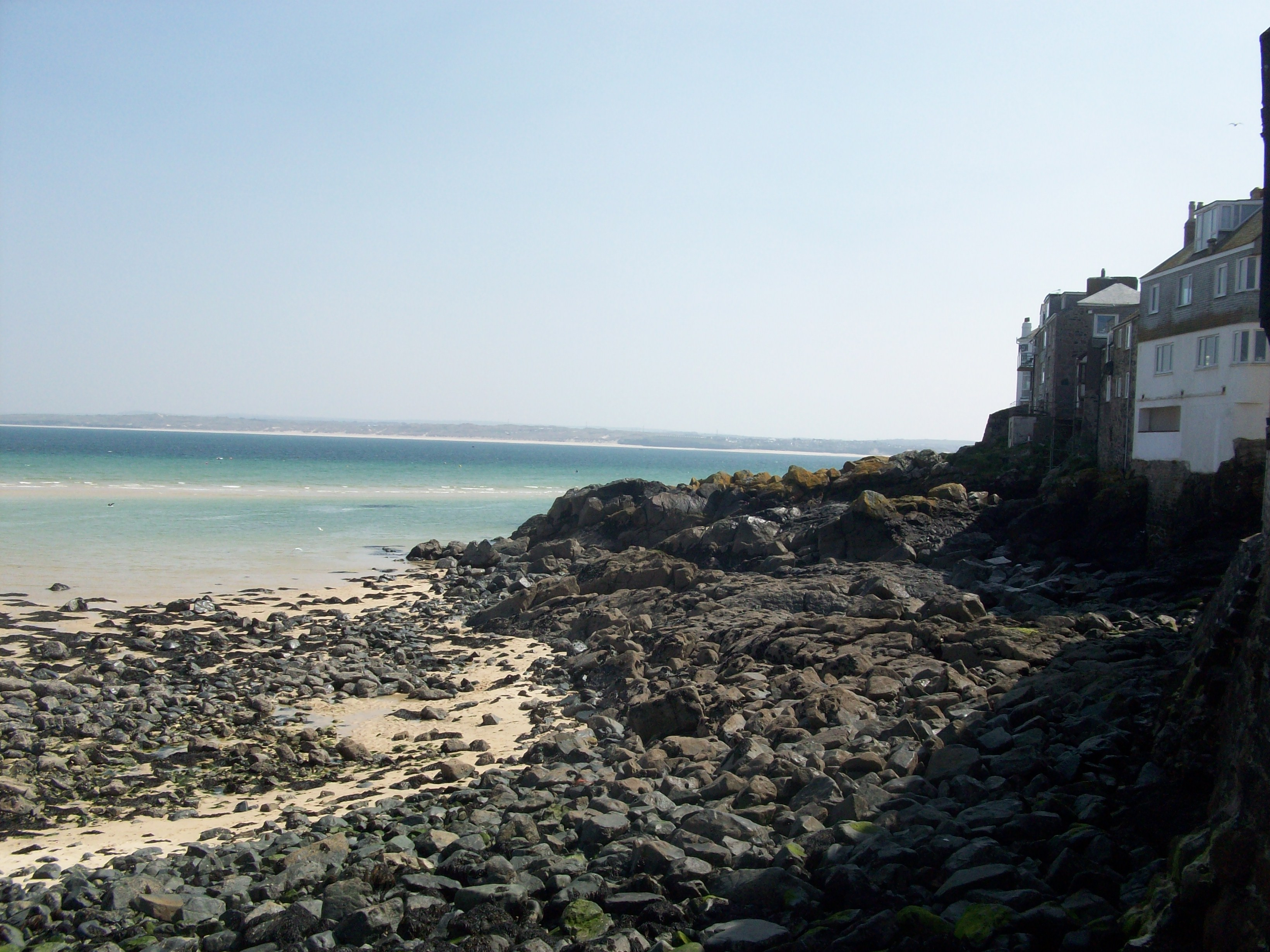
Rocky landscape

The Sloop Inn, which lies on the wharf was a fishermen's pub for many centuries and is dated to "circa 1312", making it one of the oldest inns in Cornwall.

In 1487 St Ives was granted a market charter by Henry VII, allowing it to hold a weekly market and two annual fairs. The town was the site of a particularly notable atrocity during the Prayer Book Rebellion of 1549. The English provost marshal, Anthony Kingston, came to St Ives and invited the portreeve, John Payne, to lunch at an inn. He asked the portreeve to have the gallows erected during the course of the lunch. Afterwards the portreeve and the Provost Marshal walked down to the gallows; the Provost Marshal then ordered the portreeve to mount the gallows. The portreeve was then hanged for being a "busy rebel".

The seal of St Ives is Argent, an ivy branch overspreading the whole field Vert, with the legend Sigillum Burgi St Ives in Com. Cornub. 1690.

During the Spanish Armada of 1597, two Spanish ships, a bark and a pinnace, had made their way to St Ives to seek shelter from the storm which had dispersed the Spanish fleet. They were captured by the English warship Warspite of Sir Walter Raleigh leaking from the same storm. The information given by the prisoners was vital to learning the Armada's objectives.

=== Later history ===
St Ives Harbour Beach (2011) by local artist Walter Scott (1974- )

Pedn Olva Mine, a former copper mine, at Pedn Olva Point adit, operated in St Ives before 1911, when the engine house on Pedn Olva Point was demolished, now the site of the Pedn Olva Hotel.

The modern seaside resort developed as a result of the arrival of the St Ives Bay branch line from St Erth, part of the Great Western Railway in 1877. With it came a new generation of Victorian seaside holidaymakers. Much of the town was built during the latter part of the 19th century. The railway, which winds along the cliffs and bays, survived the Beeching cuts and has become a tourist attraction itself.

In 1952, the Royal Navy warship HMS Wave ran aground near the town. The ship was later salvaged, repaired and returned to service. A propeller believed to be from HMS Wave was washed ashore in 2008.

In 1999, the town was the first landfall of the solar eclipse of 11 August 1999. The Tate St Ives displayed an exhibition called As Dark as Light, with art by Yuko Shiraishi, Garry Fabian Miller and local schoolchildren, to celebrate the event. A live BBC programme with the astronomer Patrick Moore was clouded out and the eclipse was missed.

=== Fishing ===
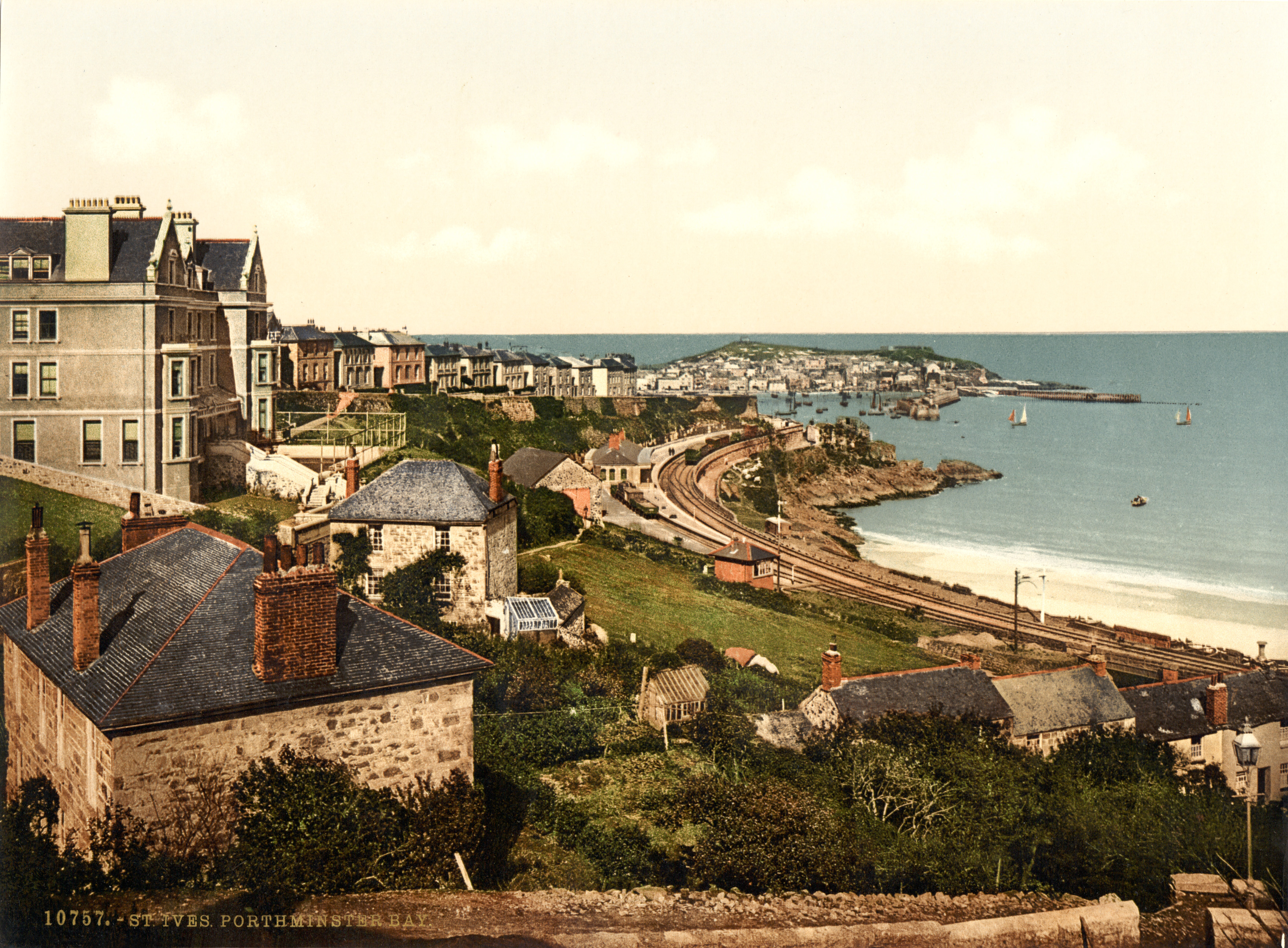
Photochrom of St Ives, 1895

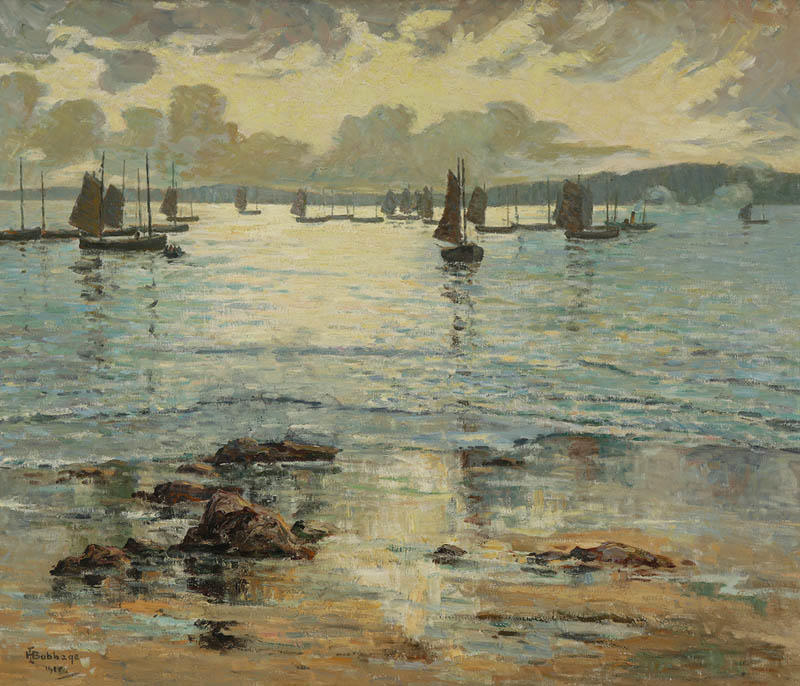
St Ives Fishing Fleet

From medieval times fishing was important at St Ives; it was one of the most important fishing ports on the north Cornish coast. The original pier's construction date is unknown but the first reference to St Ives having a pier was in 1478 in William Worcester's 'Itinerary'. The pier was re-built by John Smeaton between 1766 and 1770 after falling into disrepair. It was lengthened at a later date. The octagonal lookout with a cupola belongs to Smeaton's design.

A. K. Hamilton Jenkin describes how the St Ives fishermen strictly observed Sunday as a day of rest. St Ives was a very busy fishing port and seining was the usual method of fishing. Seining was carried out by a set of three boats of different sizes, the largest two carrying seine nets of different sizes. The total number of crew was seventeen or eighteen. However, this came to an end in 1924. In the decade 1747–1756 the total number of pilchards dispatched from the four principal Cornish ports of Falmouth, Fowey, Penzance, and St Ives averaged 30,000 hogsheads annually (making a total of 900 million fish). Much greater catches were achieved in 1790 and 1796. In 1847 the exports of pilchards from Cornwall amounted to 40,883 hogsheads or 122 million fish while the greatest number ever taken in one seine was 5,600 hogsheads at St Ives in 1868. The bulk of the catch was exported to Italy: for example, in 1830, 6,400 hogsheads were sent to Mediterranean ports. From 1829 to 1838, the yearly average for this trade was 9,000 hogsheads.

While commercial fishing is much reduced, the harbour is still in use, often for recreational boating, tourist fishing and day trips to the nearby seal colonies on the Carrack Rocks and other locations along the coast. Recently, a class of Victorian fishing boat unique to St Ives, known as a "jumbo," has been replicated by boatbuilder Jonny Nance to celebrate the town's maritime heritage. Today's jumbos are operated by the St Ives Jumbo Association.

=== Lifeboat ===
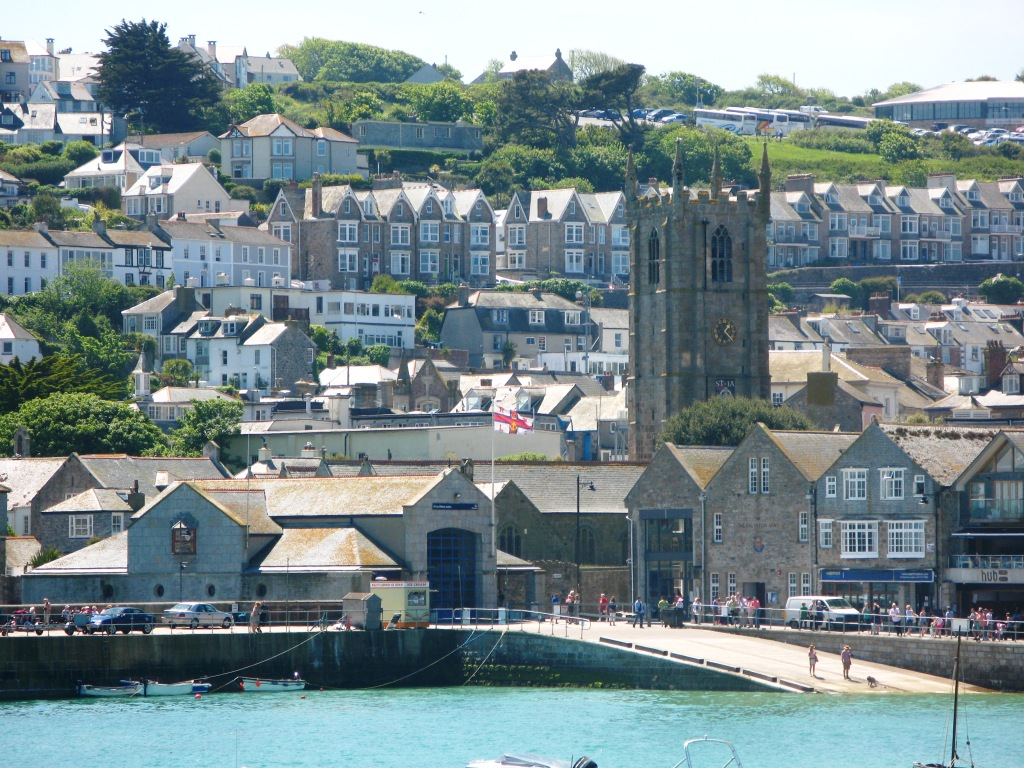
Lifeboat station in the harbour

The first lifeboat was stationed in the town in 1840. In 1867 the Royal National Lifeboat Institution (RNLI) built a boathouse at Porthgwidden beach. It proved to be a difficult site to launch from, and in 1867 it was replaced by a building in Fore Street. In 1911 a new boathouse was built on the Quay, and then in 1993 a larger station was built at the landward end of the West Pier. Since its inception in 1839, thirty eight RNLI medals have been awarded to rescuers from St Ives, 18 silver medals and 20 bronze.

Seven crewmen died in the St Ives lifeboat tragedy of 1939. In the early hours of 23 January 1939 there was a Force 10 storm blowing with gusts up to 100 miles per hour (160 km/h). The lifeboat John and Sara Eliza Stych was launched at 3 o'clock to search for a ship reported in trouble off Cape Cornwall. It rounded the Island where it met the full force of the storm as it headed westwards. It capsized three times and drifted across St Ives Bay when its propeller was fouled. The first time it turned over four men were lost; the second time one more; the third time left only one man alive. He scrambled ashore when the boat was wrecked on rocks near Godrevy Point.

=== Sharks ===
On 28 July 2007 there was a suspected sighting of a great white shark. The chairman of the Shark Trust said that "it was impossible to make a conclusive identification and that it could have also been either a Mako or a Porbeagle shark". Coastguards dismissed the claims as "scaremongering". On 14 June 2011 there was a suspected sighting of an oceanic whitetip shark; the Shark Trust said that the chances of the species being in British waters were "very small". On 18 July 2017 a suspected blue shark was spotted close to the harbour. On 16 July 2018, another blue shark was spotted in the harbour, prompting the Shark Trust to ask people to "give it plenty of space".

== Geography ==
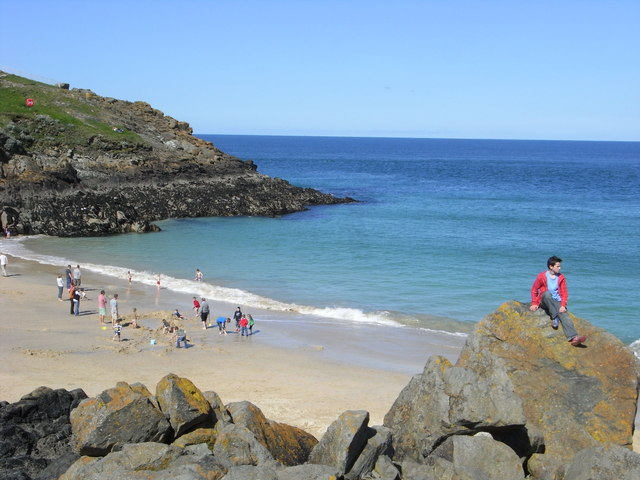
Porthgwidden Beach

St Ives is on the western shore of St Ives Bay, its harbour sheltered by St Ives Island (a headland) and Smeaton's pier. Close to the harbour, in the old part of the town, the streets are narrow and uneven while its wider streets are in the newer parts of the town on rising ground. The town has four beaches: Porthmeor a surfing beach, Porthgwidden a small sandy cove, Harbour by the working port and Porthminster which has almost half a mile of sand. St Ives has an oceanic climate and has some of the mildest winters and warmest summers in Britain and Northern Europe. It is therefore a popular tourist resort in the summer, and also benefits from an amount of sunshine per year that is above the national average. The South West Coast Path passes through the town.

Climate data for St Ives
Month	Jan	Feb	Mar	Apr	May	Jun	Jul	Aug	Sep	Oct	Nov	Dec	Year
Mean daily maximum °C (°F)	9.8 (49.6)	9.7 (49.5)	11.0 (51.8)	12.7 (54.9)	15.3 (59.5)	18.1 (64.6)	20.0 (68.0)	20.0 (68.0)	18.4 (65.1)	15.6 (60.1)	12.4 (54.3)	10.8 (51.4)	14.5 (58.1)
Mean daily minimum °C (°F)	5.2 (41.4)	5.0 (41.0)	5.7 (42.3)	6.7 (44.1)	9.1 (48.4)	11.7 (53.1)	13.7 (56.7)	13.8 (56.8)	12.5 (54.5)	10.6 (51.1)	7.6 (45.7)	6.2 (43.2)	9.0 (48.2)
Average precipitation mm (inches)	133 (5.2)	101 (4.0)	98 (3.9)	63 (2.5)	65 (2.6)	62 (2.4)	58 (2.3)	73 (2.9)	83 (3.3)	111 (4.4)	126 (5.0)	133 (5.2)	1,151 (45.31)
Average precipitation days (≥ 1.0 mm)	23	18	19	15	15	14	13	15	16	19	21	22	210
Mean monthly sunshine hours	58.5	80.1	128.8	184.1	216.6	212.4	207.8	199.0	158.6	111.2	76.5	55.6	1,689.2

== Tourism ==
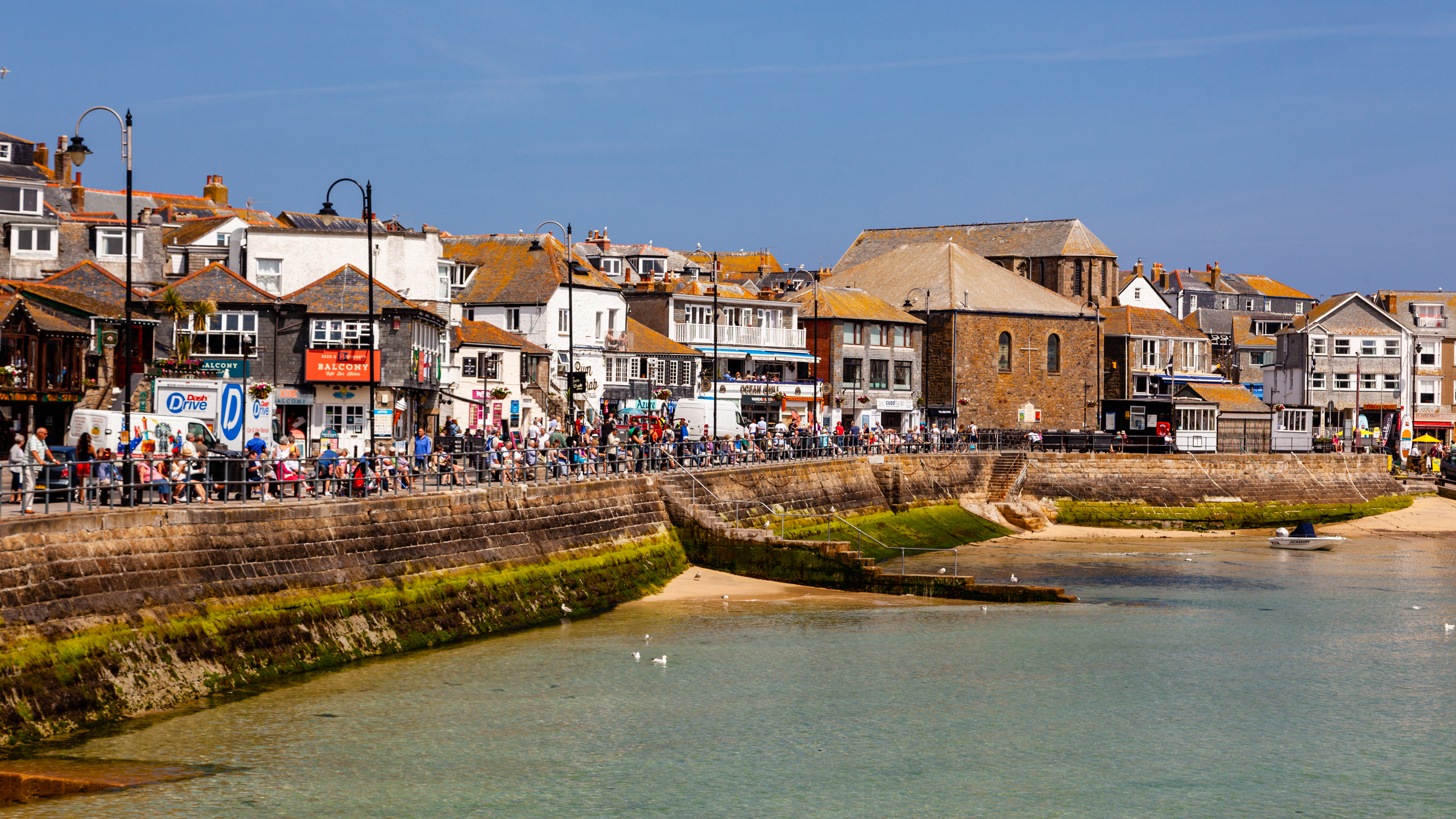
The harbourfront in summer

St Ives has been a popular tourist destination since the St Ives Bay Line opened in 1877, allowing visitors to easily get to the town. St Ives has been named the best UK seaside town by The Guardian in 2007, and by the British Travel Awards in 2010 and 2011. In 2020, St Ives was named the most expensive seaside resort in the UK. The town has the second highest visitor-related spend in the UK, with tourists spending £85 million per year. Around 540,000 day trippers and 220,000 staying tourists visit St Ives every year, with the tourism industry accounting for around 2,800 jobs in the area.

Like in the rest of Cornwall, tourism has been criticised for bringing about problems in seasonal work and affordable housing in St Ives. In 2016, St Ives residents voted to ban second-home owners from buying new build housing, with 83% in favour. This came after average house prices in the town had been pushed up to over £320,000, almost 14 times the median annual earnings of someone in Cornwall. In 2019, the Financial Times reported that average house price was £351,800, saying that the new build policy had failed to stem the number of second homes. St Ives also faces a shortage of rentals; in 2021, while there were over 1,000 properties in the town available for short-term holiday let, there was only one long-term house available to rent.

== Governance ==
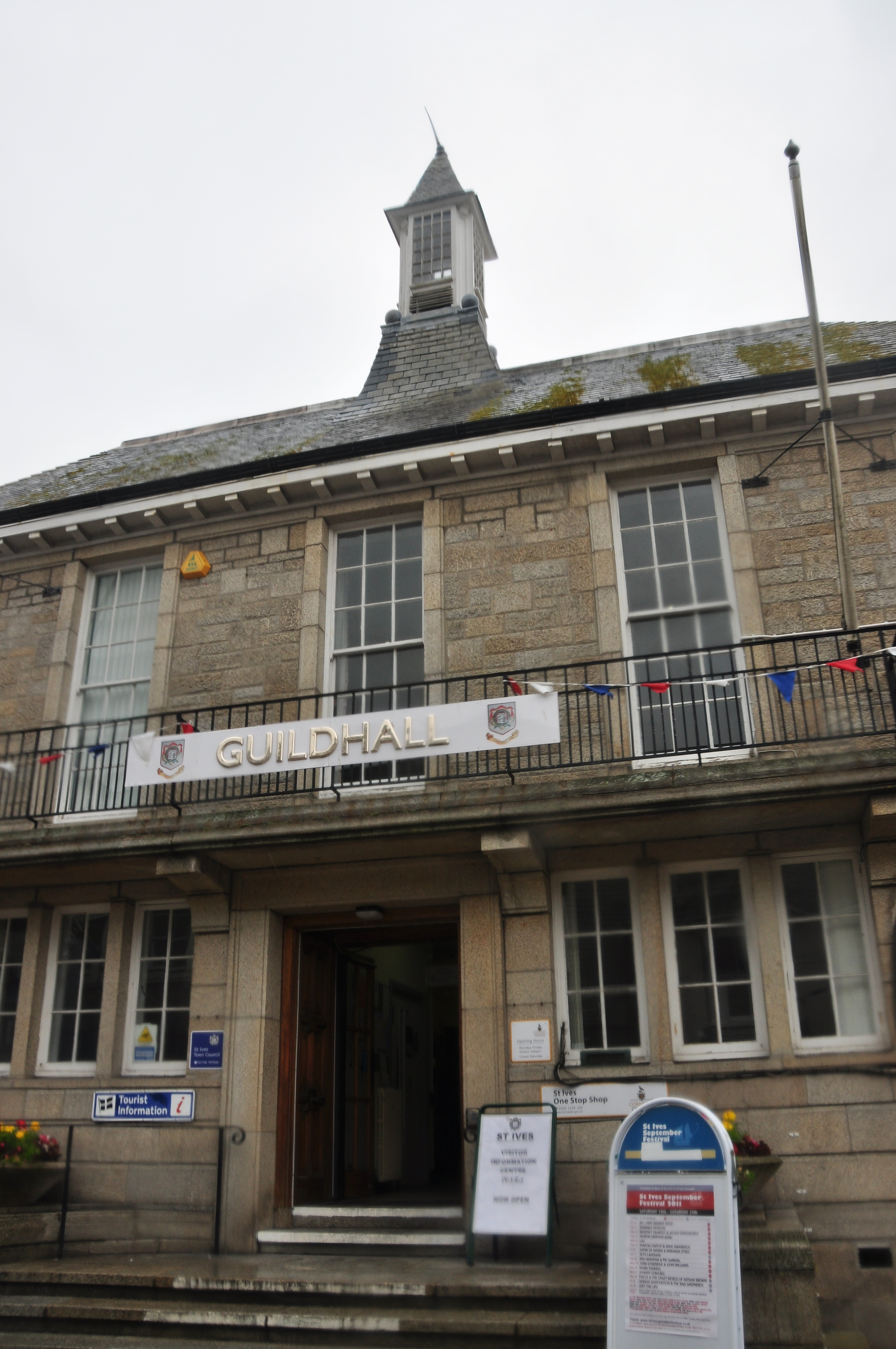
St Ives Guildhall, Street An Pol: Town Council's headquarters

There are two tiers of local government covering St Ives, at parish (town) and unitary authority level: St Ives Town Council and Cornwall Council. The town council is based at St Ives Guildhall on Street An Pol, which was completed in 1940.

=== Administrative history ===
St Ives historically formed part of the ancient parish of Uny Lelant (also known as Lelant) in the Penwith Hundred of Cornwall. When St Ia's Church was built in the early 15th century it was a chapel of ease to Lelant. The chapelry of St Ives subsequently came to be treated as a separate civil parish, but remained part of the ecclesiastical parish of Lelant until 1826, when St Ives was given funding from Queen Anne's Bounty to support its own clergy.

A St Ives parliamentary borough (constituency) was established in 1558. The town was incorporated as a borough for municipal purposes too in 1639 under a charter from Charles I. The borough boundary matched the civil parish. The borough was reformed to become a municipal borough in 1836 under the Municipal Corporations Act 1835, which standardised how most boroughs operated across the country. The 1836 reforms also saw the borough take responsibility for local policing. The St Ives Borough Police existed from 1836 until 1889, when it was taken over by Cornwall County Constabulary.

The borough was enlarged in 1934 to take in the northern part of the neighbouring parish of Uny Lelant, which was abolished, including its main settlements of Lelant village and Carbis Bay. A smaller area was transferred into the borough from the neighbouring parish of Towednack at the same time.

The borough of St Ives was abolished in 1974 under the Local Government Act 1972, when the area became part of the Penwith district. A successor parish called St Ives was created at the same time, covering the area of the abolished borough. As part of the 1974 reforms, parish councils were given the right to declare their parishes to be a town, allowing them to take the title of town council and giving the title of mayor to the council's chairperson. The new parish council for St Ives exercised this right, taking the name St Ives Town Council.

The Hepworth bronze 'Epidaurous' with Porthminster beach in the background.

In 2026 the Town Council completed the renovation of The Malakoff (taking its name from a notable battle in the Crimean War), a short promontory with small park and bus shelter overlooking the town and one of its principle beaches, Porthminster. It provides a backdrop for the bronze sculpture 'Epidaurous' which Barbara Hepworth donated to the town.

Penwith district was abolished in 2009. Cornwall County Council then took on district-level functions, making it a unitary authority, and was renamed Cornwall Council.

== Religion ==
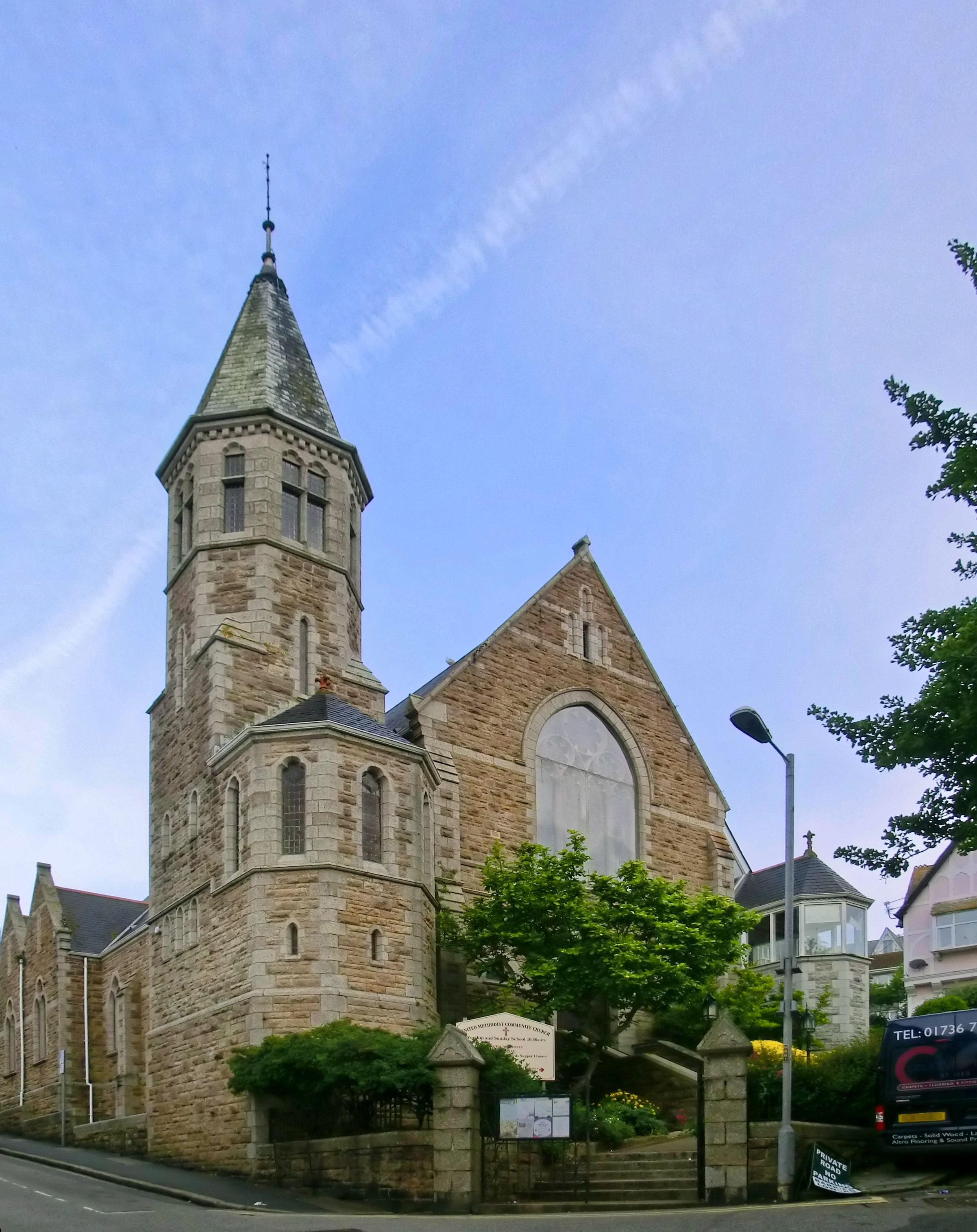
Methodist Church, Bedford Road

St Ia's parish church is dedicated to Ia of Cornwall, an Irish holy woman of the 5th or 6th century, and St Andrew, the patron saint of fishermen. In 1408 the townsmen attempted to get a papal bull to authorise the consecration of their church and cemetery, but they did not achieve this, so they continued without the rights of baptism or burial. However, they undertook the building of the present church between 1410 and 1434 as a chapel of ease, St Ives being within the parish of Lelant. They were able to obtain the right to a font in 1428 but consecration of the cemetery only in 1542. For over a century the vicars of Lelant had resisted demands from the inhabitants of St Ives and Towednack for the right of sepulture but in 1542 the right was granted so the vicars transferred their residence to St Ives and abandoned the vicarage of Lelant. There was damage to the church in 1697 when a storm broke through the sea-wall and damaged the roof and a large window over the altar.

There are chapels dedicated to St Nicholas on the headland of St Ives Island and St Leonard on the quay which were used by the fishermen and have been converted for other uses. The former chapel of St Nicholas was partially demolished by the War Office in 1904 but rebuilt in 1909, possibly by E. H. Sedding, from the old materials. It is plain and rectangular and has since been converted into the New Gallery.

The Roman Catholic Church of the Sacred Heart and St Ia was built in 1909 to a design by A J C Scoles. There are also two Methodist chapels, one in Fore Street of 1831, and another of 1845 higher up the valley, and a Congregational chapel of 1800.

== Culture ==
=== Art ===
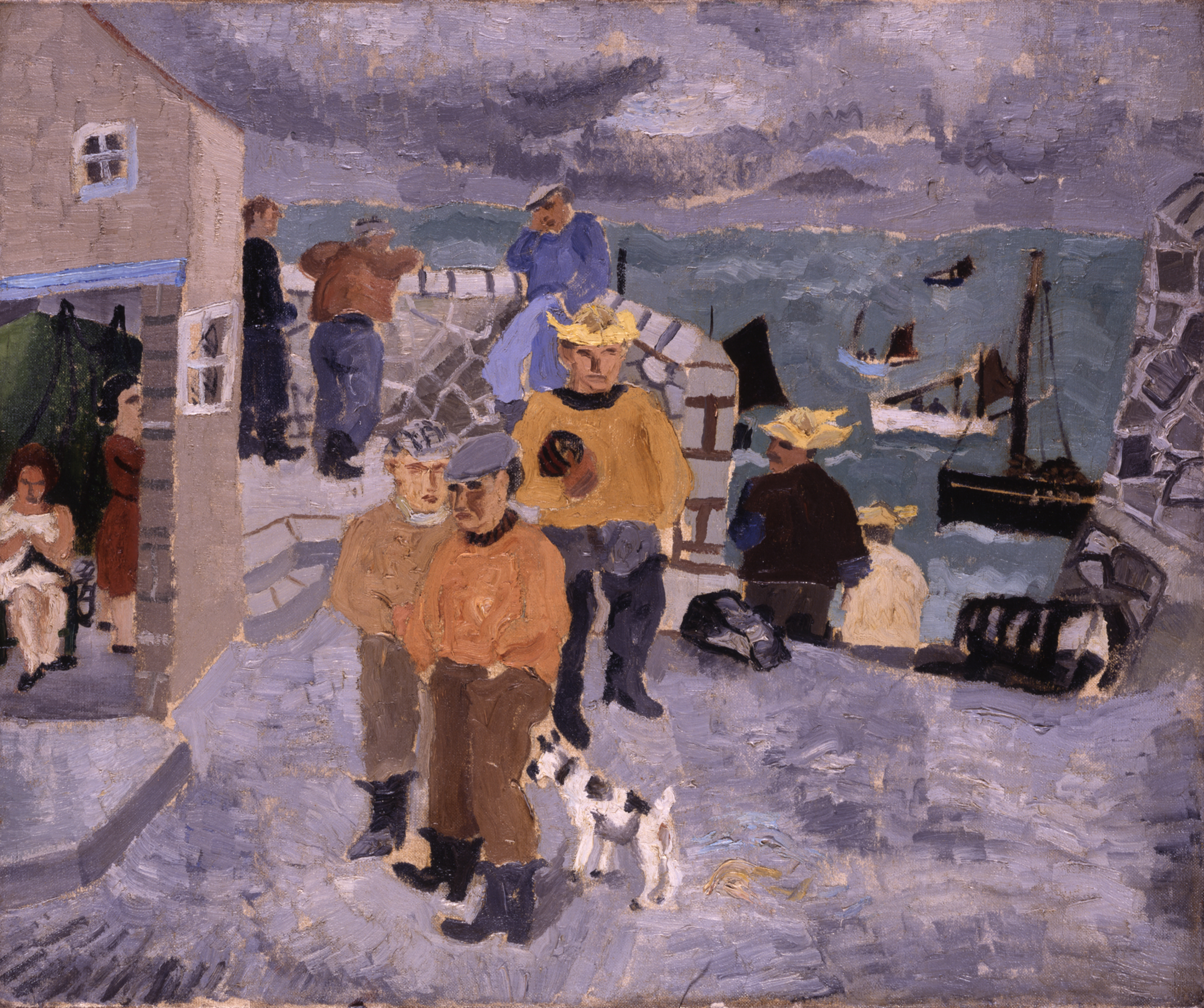
Cornish Fishermen, The Quay, St Ives by Christopher Wood, 1928

J. M. W. Turner arrived in St Ives in 1811. In 1884, James Whistler and Walter Sickert visited on the improved railway. Bernard Leach and Shōji Hamada set up the Leach Pottery in 1920. Leach, who was a studio potter and art teacher and is known as the "Father of British studio pottery", learned pottery under the direction of Shigekichi Urano (Kenzan VI) in Japan where he also met Shōji Hamada. They promoted pottery from the point of view of Western and Eastern arts and philosophies. Leach produced work until 1972, and the Victoria and Albert Museum held an exhibition of his work in 1977. The Leach Pottery remains operational and houses a small museum showcasing work by Leach and his students.

English artist Jessie Case Vesel lived in St Ives around 1913.

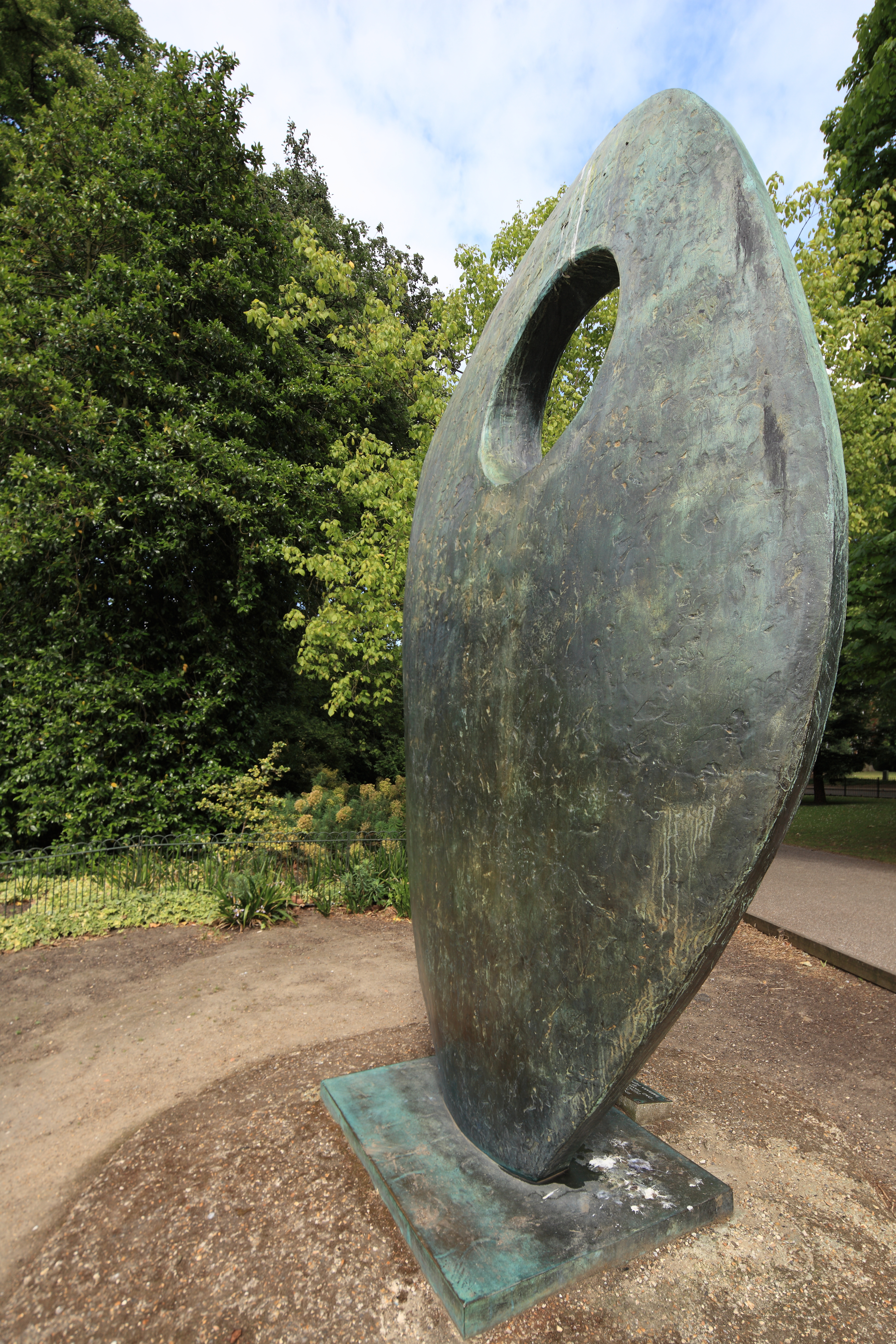
Barbara Hepworth's Single Form in Battersea Park

In 1928, the Cornish artist Alfred Wallis and Ben Nicholson and Christopher Wood met at St Ives and laid the foundation for the St Ives School artists' colony there. In 1939, Ben Nicholson, Barbara Hepworth and Naum Gabo settled in St Ives, attracted by its beauty. In 1993, a branch of the Tate Gallery, the Tate St Ives, opened. The Tate has owned the Barbara Hepworth Museum and her sculpture garden since 1980, as well as her Palais de Danse studio since 2015. The town attracted artists from overseas such as Maurice Sumray who moved from London in 1968, and Piet Mondrian, and continues to do so today with younger artists such as Michael Polat, who took up residence there from his native Germany in 1999.

Before the 1940s, most artists in St Ives and West Cornwall belonged to the St Ives Society of Artists, but events in the late 1940s led to a dispute between the abstract and figurative artists in the group. In 1948, the abstract faction broke away to form the Penwith Society of Artists led by Barbara Hepworth and Ben Nicholson.

In 1962 Frederick Spratt took a sabbatical in Britain for one year, where he lived and painted representationally in St Ives.

The studio pottery Troika was set up in 1963.

In 2010, a BBC Four film, The Art of Cornwall, presented by James Fox said that the St Ives artists "went on to produce some of the most exhilarating art of the twentieth century...for a few dazzling years this place was as famous as Paris, as exciting as New York and infinitely more progressive than London." The programme explored the lives and works of the key figures and their contributions in establishing St Ives as a major centre of British art from the 1920s onwards.

=== Museums ===
The Barbara Hepworth Museum and her sculpture garden are the responsibility of Tate St Ives. It was the wish of the late sculptor to leave her work on public display in perpetuity. The St Ives Museum has exhibits illustrating local history and culture, including mining, fishing, agriculture and domestic life.

=== Festivals ===
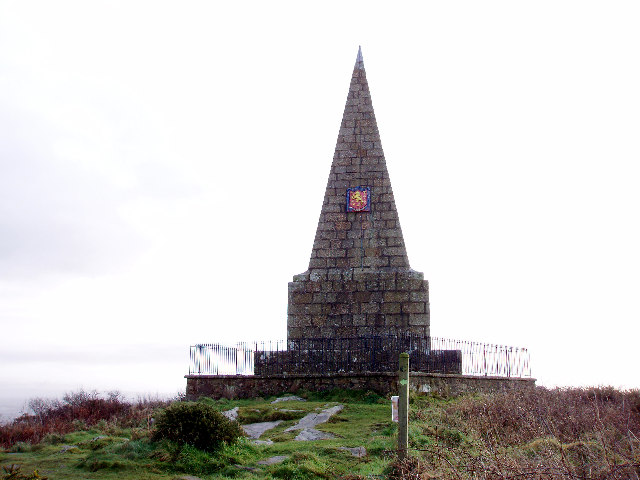
Knill's Monument, near St Ives, commemorating the mayor, John Knill

John Knill, a former mayor, constructed the Knill Steeple, a granite monument overlooking the town. In 1797, Knill laid down instructions for the celebration of the Knill Ceremony, which was to take place every five years on 25 July (St James's Day). The ceremony involves the Mayor of St Ives, a customs officer, and a vicar accompanied by two widows and ten girls who should be the "daughters of fishermen, tinners, or seamen". The ceremonies used to have athletic games, called the "Knillian games", which included Cornish wrestling.

A second celebration, of perhaps greater antiquity, is St Ives Feast, a celebration of the founding of St Ives by St Ia, which takes place on the Sunday and Monday nearest to 3 February each year. It includes a civic procession to Venton Ia, the well of St Ia, and other associated activities. It is one of the two surviving examples of Cornish Hurling (in a gentler format than its other manifestation at St Columb Major).

A third festival is the St Ives May Day, a modern revival of West Cornwall May Day celebrations that were once common throughout west Cornwall.

The St Ives September Festival celebrated its 30th anniversary in September 2008. It is one of the longest running and widest ranging Festivals of the Arts in the UK lasting for fifteen days and includes music (folk, jazz, rock, classical & world), poetry, film, talks and books. It was founded in 1978 as a joint venture by local entrepreneurs and the International Musicians Seminar. Many local artists open up their studios to allow visitors to see how their art is produced. There is free music in many pubs almost every night, and concerts. Many events are held at the Western Hotel or St Ives Guildhall. St Ives has a 500-seat theatre which hosts some of the festival events.

=== Literature and popular culture ===
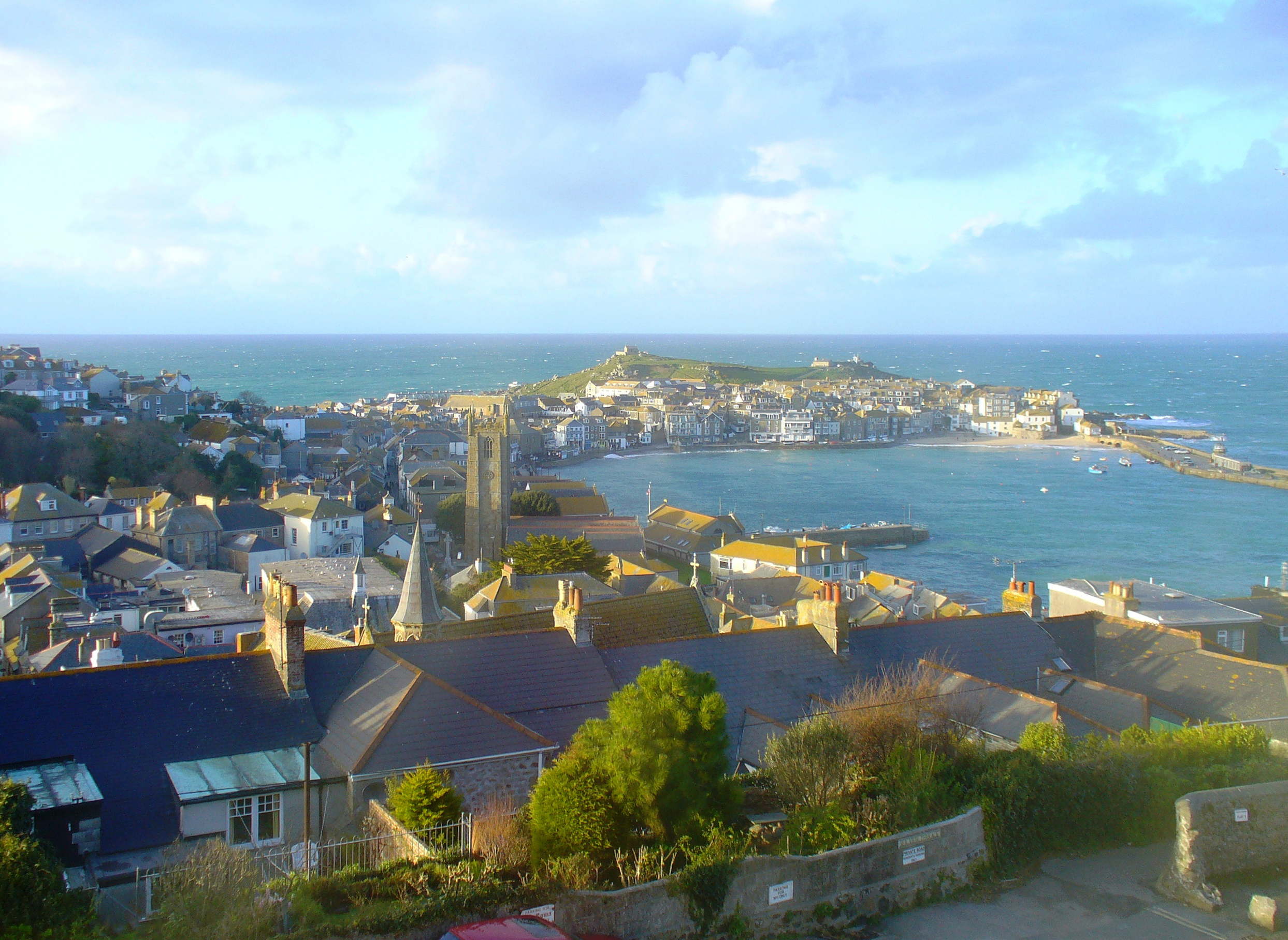
St Ives harbour and the sea beyond

Early-20th-century figures in St Ives appear in Virginia Woolf's reflections contained in "A Sketch of the Past", from Moments of Being, "... I could fill pages remembering one thing after another. All together made the summer at St. Ives the best beginning to life imaginable." Her 1927 novel To the Lighthouse is said to have been influenced by the view from Talland House where she stayed with her parents on family holidays.

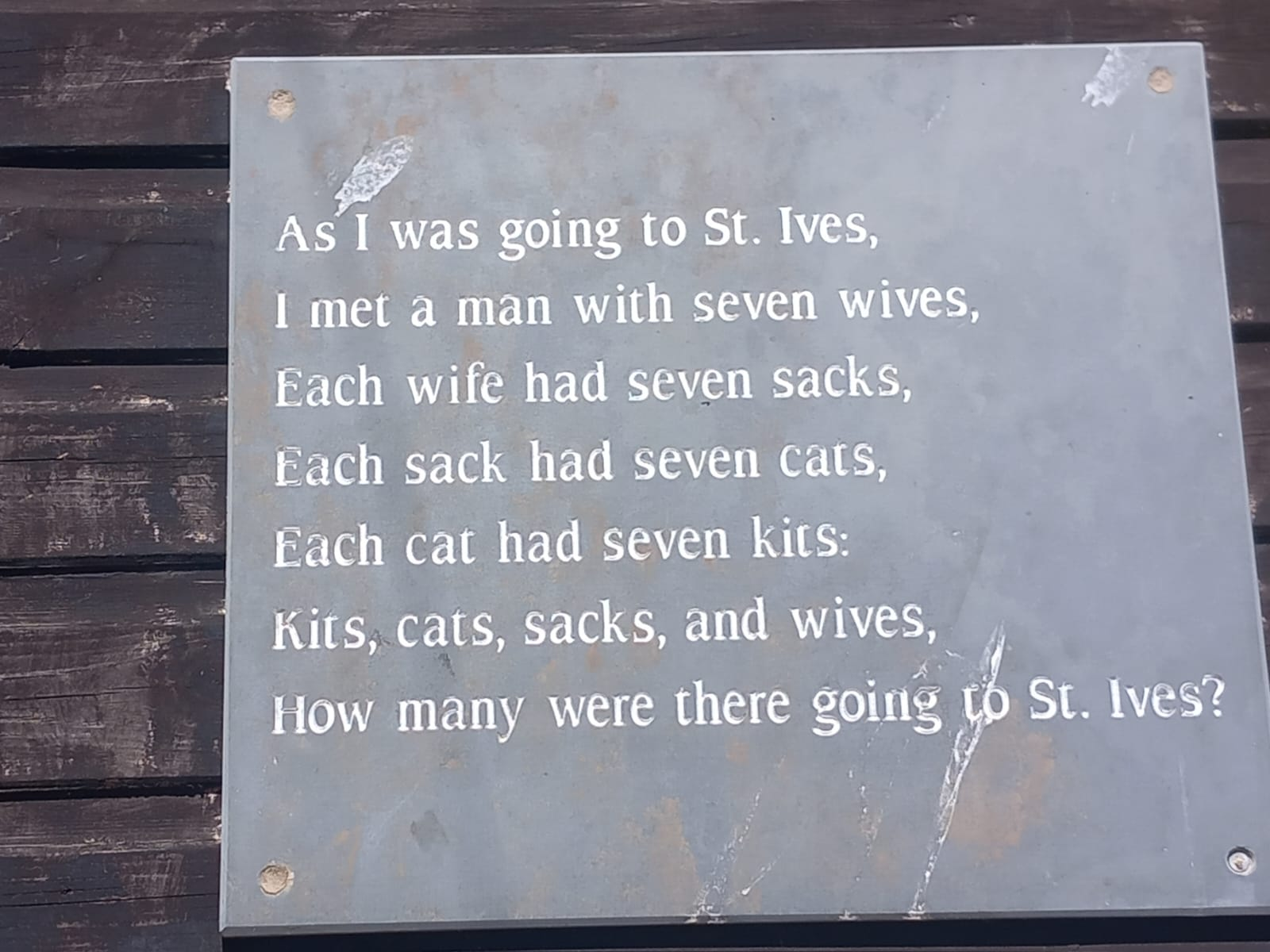
Copy of the nursery rhyme "As I was going to St Ives" located in St Ives

This St Ives is generally believed to be the one referred to in the famous nursery rhyme "As I was going to St Ives".

The Cornish language poet Mick Paynter is resident in St Ives.

Modern-day novelist Elizabeth Day, author of The Party, writes many of her novels whilst staying in St Andrews Street in St Ives.

The Ulysses Moore series of books, written by Pierdomenico Baccalario are based in the hypothetical village of Kilmore Cove near Zennor and St Ives.

Helen Dunmore's novel Zennor in Darkness is set locally, at the time of the First World War, when D. H. Lawrence and his German wife came to Cornwall to escape the war in London.

Lauren St John's Dead Man's Cove is situated in St. Ives. The first in a series of books about an eleven-year-old girl called Laura Marlin, who becomes a detective.

The St Ives Literature Festival is an annual week-long event, started in 2008, in May. Open air performances are held in Norway Square and the St Ives Arts Club, as well as talks, workshops and live music.

=== Film and TV ===
In 1978/1979 the town, the pub The Sloop Inn and Barnoon Cemetery were filmed and appeared in Jerry Jameson's film Raise the Titanic released in 1980. The final scenes with Alec Guinness were meant to have occurred in a local church but a unusually strong storm a few days earlier had damaged the building rendering it unsuitable for filming.

In 1989, a public television crew from Alaska shot scenes for a docudrama about American artist Sydney Mortimer Laurence (1865-1940), who was a member of the St. Ives Arts Club in the late 19th century. Several St. Ives residents, in period costumes, appeared as extras in the production. "Laurence of Alaska," which won two regional Emmy Awards, was produced by KAKM, Alaska Public Television, and later aired on public stations across the U.S.

The Discovery Travel and Living programme Beach Café, featuring Australian chef Michael Smith, was filmed in St Ives.

=== Local media ===
Regional TV news is provided by BBC South West and ITV West Country. Television signals are received from either the Redruth or Caradon Hill TV transmitters.

Local radio stations are BBC Radio Cornwall on 103.9 FM, Heart West on 107.0 FM, and Coast FM, a community radio station that broadcast to the town on 96.5 FM.

The St. Ives Times & Echo is the town’s local weekly newspaper.

== Sport ==
Club flag of St Ives Sailing Club, established in 1972

St Ives is the home of St Ives Rugby Football Club (founded 1889) who play at the Recreation Ground on Alexandra Road. Once one of the dominant clubs in Cornish rugby, they currently play in Tribute Western Counties West league, (tier 7 of the English rugby union system). There is also a football team, St Ives Town F.C., who play in the Cornwall Combination (division 12 of the English football system). Their ground is at Lelant Saltings.

=== Cornish wrestling ===
Cornish wrestling tournaments, for prizes, were held in the following places over the last two centuries:

- The Knill mausoleum.
- Tregenna Park.
- The Drill field.
- The Moor field, The Belyars.

== Transport ==
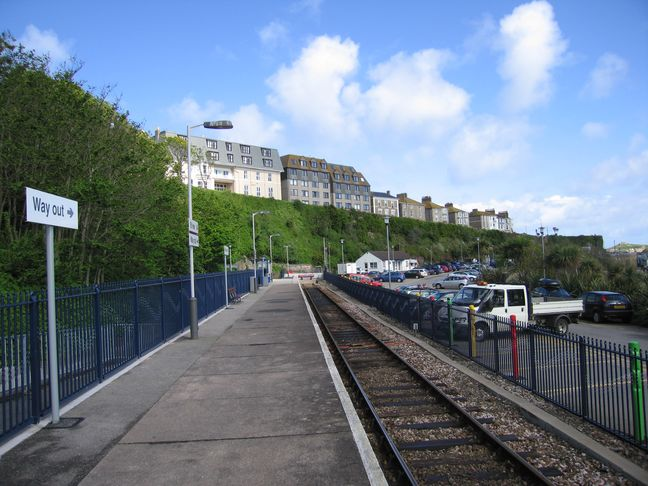
St Ives station

St Ives railway station is linked to the Paddington to Penzance main rail route via the St Ives branch line which runs frequent services from St Erth. The line was opened in 1877 by the St Ives branch railway, but became part of the Great Western Railway in 1878. Before 2019, the park & ride facility for visitors to St Ives ran from Lelant Saltings railway station. The station had been opened on 27 May 1978 specifically for this purpose. After development works at St Erth station in 2019 to improve transport links, the park and ride was moved there. The branchline also links the St Ives to nearby Carbis Bay and Lelant.

The town also has regular services by Go Cornwall Bus buses to nearby towns and villages, such as Zennor, Penzance and Truro.

The nearest airports to St Ives are Newquay and Land's End Airport, near St Just. Private jets, charters and helicopters are served by Perranporth Airfield.

== Twinning ==
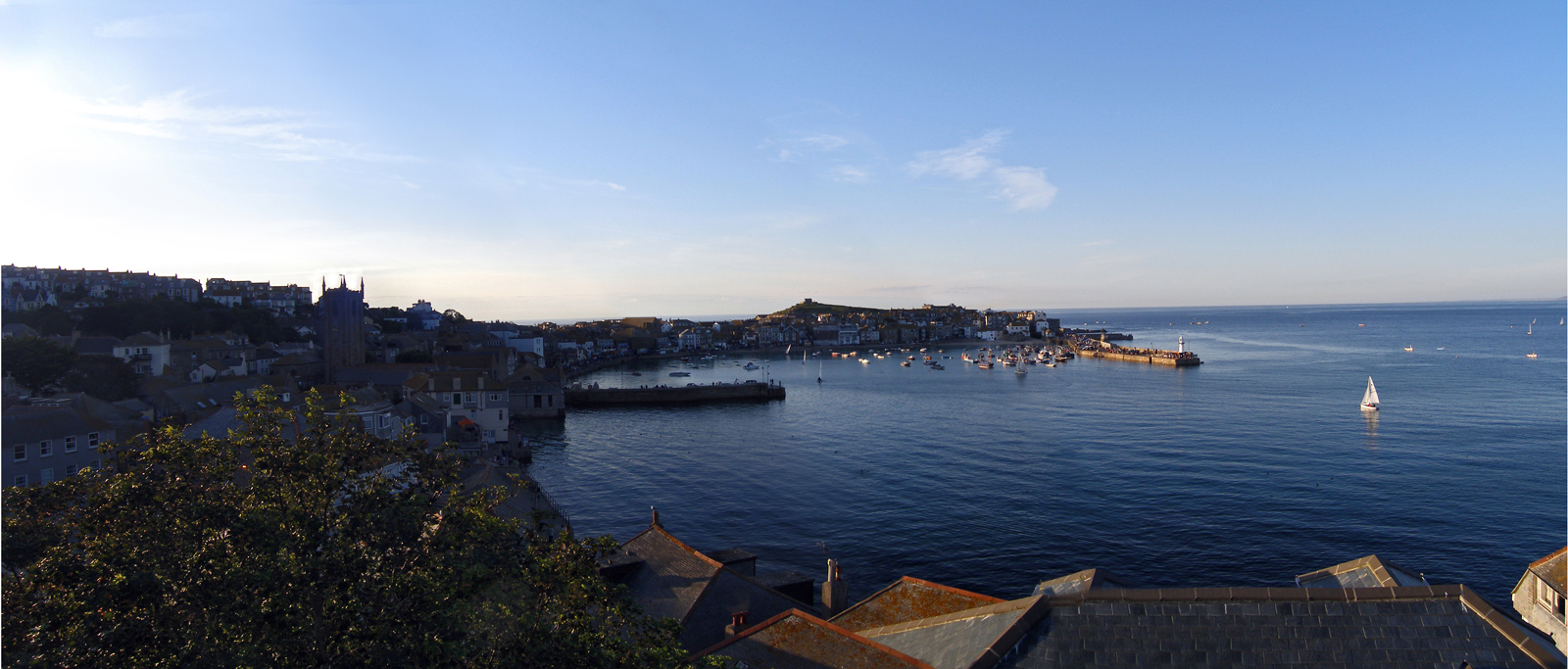
St Ives harbour from the bus stop

St Ives is twinned with Camaret-sur-Mer (Breton: Kameled) in Brittany, France and has friendship agreements with Laguna Beach, California and Mashiko, Tochigi, Japan.

On Sunday 7 September 2014, St Ives had a ceremony to make St Ives and Laguna Beach, California, US sister cities.

== Notable people ==
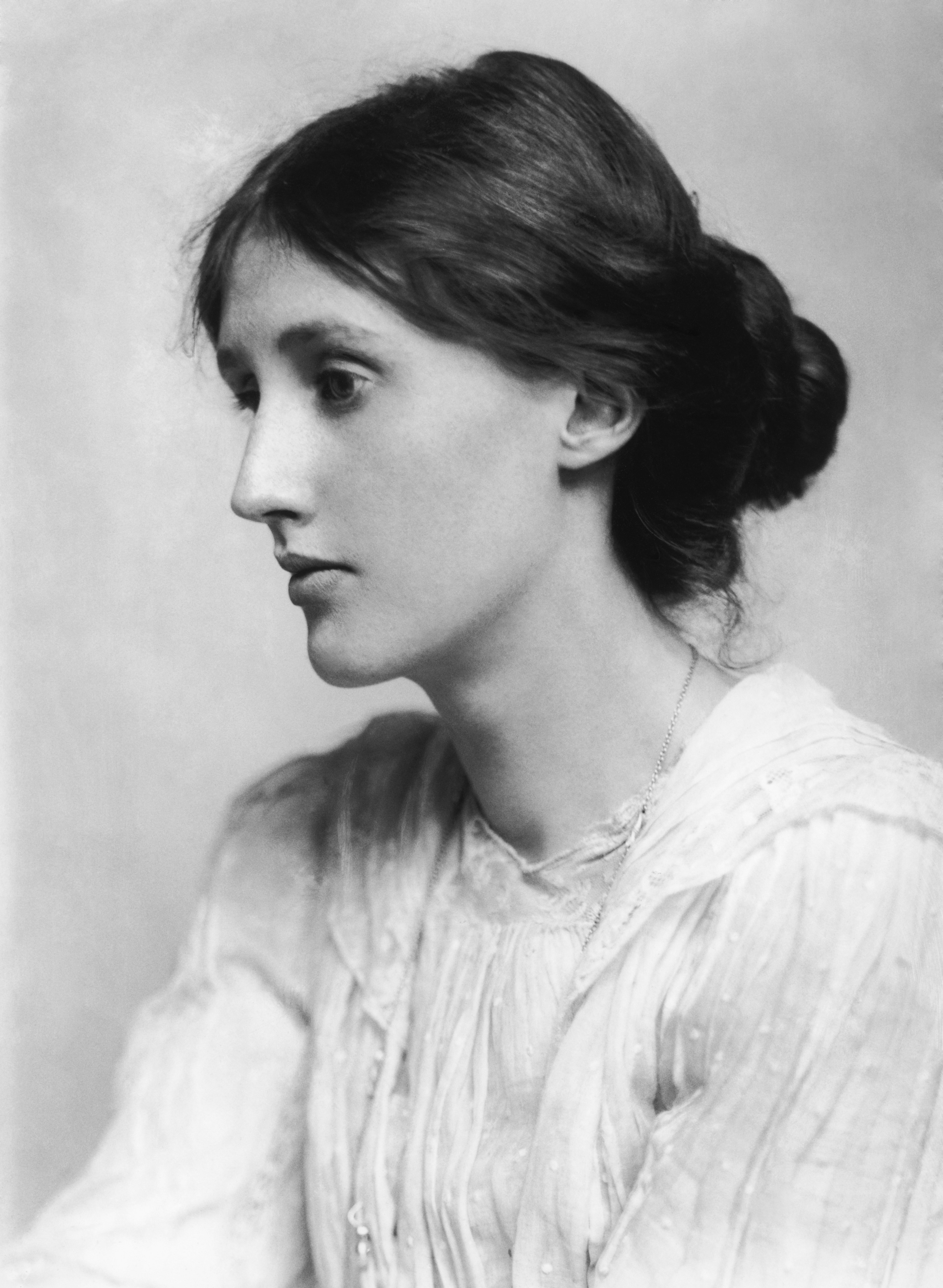
Virginia Woolf, 1902

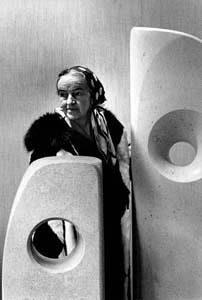
Barbara Hepworth, 1966

=== Arts ===
- Richard Short (1841–1919), was a Cornish artist; Amgueddfa Cymru – Museum Wales holds five of his works.
- John Noble Barlow (1861–1917), English artist, predominantly as a landscape and seascape painter, lived in St Ives from 1892.
- Virginia Woolf (1882–1941), English novelist, spent much of her childhood here with her family between 1882 and 1894.
- Warwick Ward (1891–1967), actor and film producer, appeared in 64 films 1919/1933; he produced 19 films 1931/1958.
- Mabel Lethbridge (1900–1968), youngest person to receive a British Empire Medal, after she was severely injured when a shell exploded in a munition factory in the Great War, lived in St Ives from 1945 as a writer.
- Barbara Hepworth (1903–1975), English Modernism artist and sculptor, lived and worked in St Ives from 1949.
- Sven Berlin (1911–1999), English painter, fiction writer and sculptor, lived and worked in St Ives from 1938 to 1953.
- George Lloyd (1913–1998), a British composer of part Welsh and part American ancestry.
- Margaret Mellis (1914–2009), British artist, one of the early members and last survivors of the group of modernist local artists
- Bryan Wynter (1915–1975), one of the St Ives group of painters, working mainly abstract, drawing upon nature
- Peter Lanyon (1918–1964), a Cornish painter of landscapes, leaning heavily towards abstract art
- Patrick Heron (1920–1999), British abstract and figurative artist, lived in Zennor.
- William Marshall (1923–2007), English studio potter who joined the Leach Pottery
- Bryan Pearce (1929–2007), British painter. He was recognised as one of the UK's leading naïve artists.
- John Milne (1931–1978), abstract sculptor who worked in bronze, wood and aluminium and stone.
- John Leach (1939-2021) a studio potter
- Mick Paynter (1948), retired civil servant, trade union activist and poet; Grand Bard of Cornwall
- Jon Middlemiss (1949–2021), a British artist and potter.
- Anthony Frost (born 1951), English painter noted for his abstract works consisting of brightly coloured prints and collages
- Simon Garfield (born 1960), British writer of nonfiction books, including Just My Type: A Book About Fonts, has a home in St Ives
- Fleur Bennett (born 1968), British television actress, known for her work in Grace and Favour
- Fink (born 1972), aka Fin Greenall English singer, songwriter, guitarist, producer and DJ

=== Public service, public thinking ===
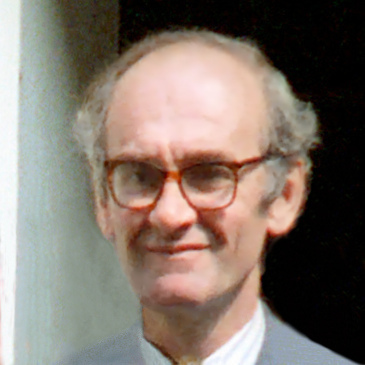
John Nott, 1982

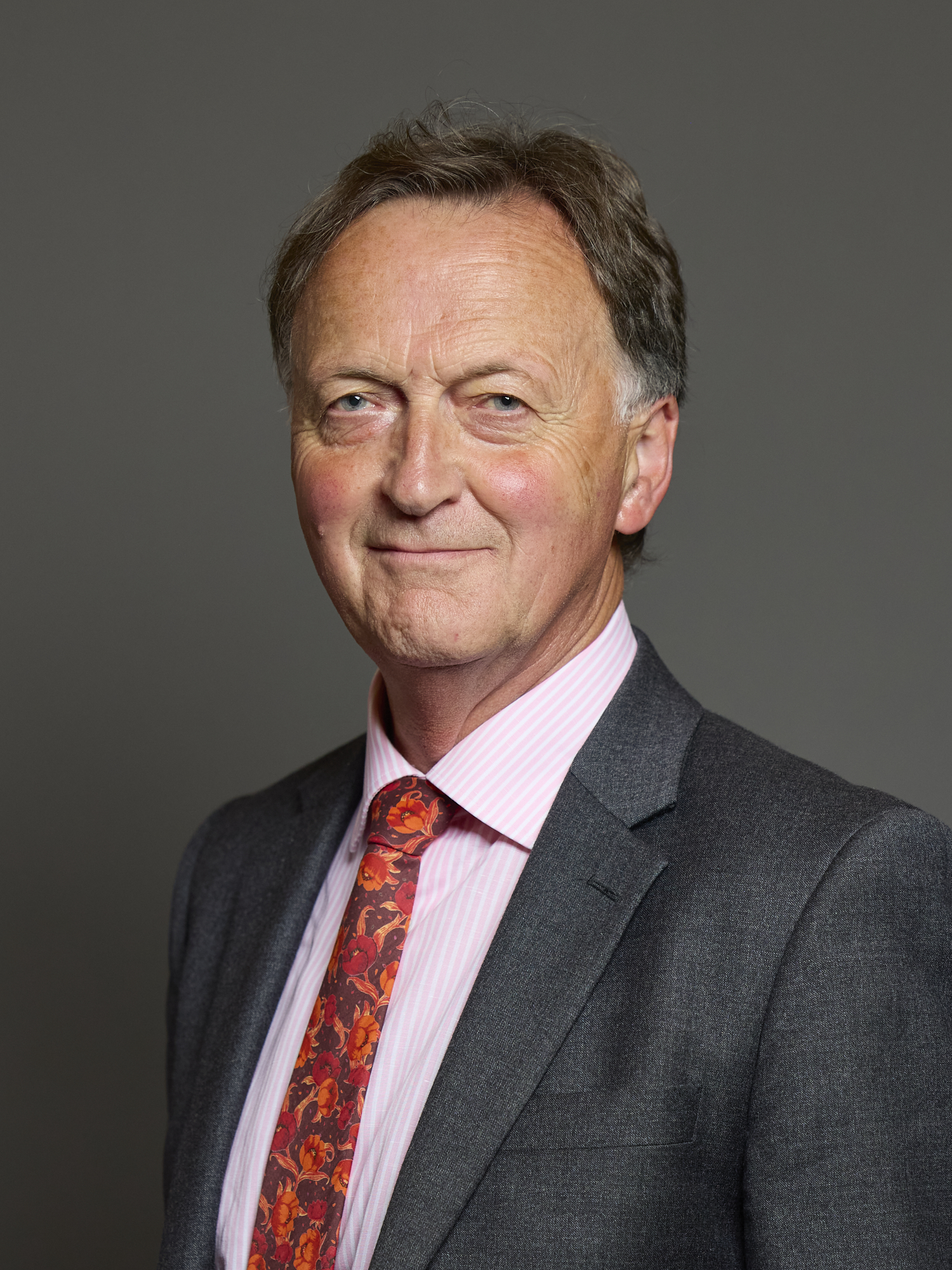
Andrew George, 2024

- Rev. Thomas Tregosse (c. 1600– c. 1670), Puritan minister who was silenced for being a Nonconformist
- Jonathan Toup (1713–1785), English philologist, classical scholar and critic.
- John Knill (1733–1811), slightly eccentric mayor of St Ives and Collector of Customs at St Ives from 1762 to 1782
- Charles Arbuthnot (1767–1850), diplomat, politician and MP for St Ives, 1828 to 1830.
- James Halse (1769–1838), English lawyer, wealthy businessman and Tory (later Conservative) politician. Settled in St Ives in 1790.
- John Baragwanath (1817–1885), miner and politician in Australia, member of Victorian Legislative Assembly
- Sir Edward Hain (1851–1917), shipping owner, MP for St Ives as a Liberal Unionist 1900/04, and as a Liberal 1904/06
- Percy Lane Oliver (1878–1944), from St Ives was the founder of the first voluntary blood donation service in 1921.
- Thomas Wedge (1881–1964) rugby union player, won a team silver medal at the 1908 Summer Olympics.
- Nicholas Tregurtha (1884–1964), rugby union player who won a team silver medal at the 1908 Summer Olympics.
- Greville Howard (1909–1987), politician and MP for St Ives 1950/1966
- John Nott (born 1932), former British Conservative Party MP for St Ives from 1966 to 1983, Secretary of State for Defence during the Falkland war, now lives on his farm at St Erth
- David Harris (born 1937), British Conservative Party MP for St Ives from 1983 to 1997
- Jennifer Gretton, Baroness Gretton (born 1943), Lord Lieutenant of Leicestershire from 2003 to 2018
- Andrew George (born 1958 in Mullion), British Liberal Democrat politician and MP for St Ives from 1997 to 2015, and again since 2024
- Derek Thomas (born 1972), property developer, politician and MP for St Ives, 2015-2024

== See also ==
- List of St Ives artists
- St Ives (UK Parliament constituency)
- St Ives School, the local secondary school
