= Hankey (surname) =

Hankey is a surname. Notable people with the surname include:

- Albert Hankey (1914–1998), English footballer
- Alex Hankey (born 1947), British physicist
- Beatrice Hankey (1858–1933), British evangelist
- Don Hankey (born 1943), American businessman
- Donald Hankey (1884–1916), English soldier and writer
- Euan Hankey (born 1987), British racing driver
- Frederick Hankey (diplomat) (1774–1855), British military officer, diplomat and colonial administrator
- Frederick Hankey (politician) (1833–1892), English banker and politician
- Graeme Hankey, Australian neurologist
- Henry Aitchison Hankey (1805–1886), British military officer
- Joseph Hankey (1754–1803), English banker and politician
- Katherine Hankey (1834–1911), English missionary
- Mabel Lee Hankey (1867–1943), British artist
- Maurice Hankey, 1st Baron Hankey (1877–1963), British military official
- Montagu Hankey (1840–1919), English Anglican cleric
- Patrick Hankey (1886–1973), Anglican priest
- Reginald Hankey (1832–1886), English cricketer
- Richard Hankey (1766–1817), English banker and politician
- Robert Hankey, 2nd Baron Hankey (1905–1996), British diplomat and public servant
- Ted Hankey (born 1968), English darts player
- Thomson Hankey (1805–1893), British merchant, banker and politician
- Vronwy Hankey (1916–1998), British archaeologist and academic
- Wayne John Hankey (1944–2022), Canadian religious philosopher
- William Lee Hankey (1869–1952), British painter, printmaker, and illustrator
