= Arthur Baker-Clack =

Australian-born British painter

- Born: Arthur Baker Clack; 10 January 1877 'Bendleby', Booleroo, South Australia
- Died: 1955 (aged 77–78); Folkestone, Kent, England
- Education: Way College, Wayville, South Australia
- Occupation: Painter
- Style: Impressionism
- Spouse: Edith Mary nee Baker (1871– 29 April 1960 Hythe, Kent)
- Parent(s): Noah Clack (18371904) and Harriet nee Baker (1836–1901)

Arthur Baker–Clack (10 January 1877 – 1955) was an Australian-born painter in the impressionist school. He was at the art colony at Étaples, Pas-de-Calais, Nord-Pas-de-Calais, France from 1910, and continued to live in the region during World War I and after.

== Early life and education ==
Arthur Baker Clack was born at Booleroo in South Australia on 10 January 1877.

He studied art at James Ashton's Art Academy, in Adelaide and at Way College, Wayville, South Australia (1899–1900).

He also trained in London and Paris and with Rupert Bunny at Étaples.

== Career ==
Baker-Clack was a tutor at Conmurra Station, Kingston SE, South Australia.

He worked as a journalist at The Register before moving to the Perth Morning Herald covering the Western Australian goldfields.

He exhibited in Paris, London and Australia and was a jury member for the Salon d'Automne and of the Société Nationale des Beaux-Arts. He was also chairman of the Folkestone Art Society.

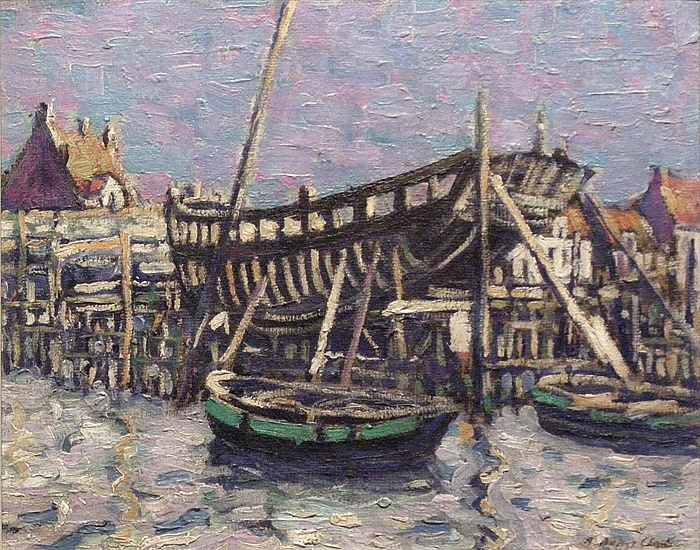
Arthur Baker-Clack, The Boat Yard, 1913

== Personal ==
He lived in Étaples with his wife, Edith, however their house was destroyed during World War I. After the war they built a residence at Etaples, 'Bendlebi'. Edith had been his nurse during a period of illness.

Baker-Clack died at Folkestone, England in 1955.
