= Étaples art colony =

Late 19th-Early 20th Century Artists retreat in Étaples, France

The Étaples art colony was a fin de siècle artists' retreat situated near the fishing port of Étaples, in northern France. The colony experienced its heyday between 1880 and 1914 before the outbreak of World War I led to its disruption. Although cosmopolitan in composition, the majority of inhabitants were Anglophone artists from North America, Australasia and the British Isles. While some artists settled permanently, others remained at the colony for a sole season, or an even shorter time as it was common for Bohemian painters of this period to lead a peripatetic existence, travelling between the various art colonies situated along the coasts of Normandy and Brittany. Stylistically, the Étaples artists represent a diverse range of schools with certain common interests, including a preoccupation with the landscape of the region, the proper use of natural light, as well as a shared interest in the lives of the common folk, fishermen and peasants, of the region. While most painters left the town in 1914 at the outbreak of war, artistic activities continued at Étaples during the conflict, pursued by artists in uniform and war artists. Following the Treaty of Versailles which ended the war, some artists returned to their studios and the persistence of a small colony continued to attract visitors to the area, although little outstanding work now resulted.

== Early decades ==
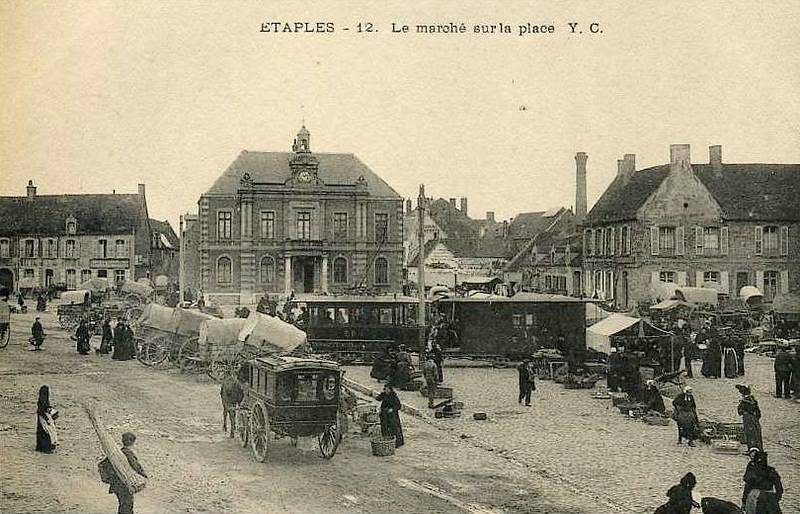
The market place and Étaples town hall, shortly after the tramway was built in 1900

The first French artists to paint in the area were those particularly associated with plein air painting. Charles-François Daubigny retreated there from the outbreak of the Paris Commune in 1871, where he spent his time drawing and executed at least one oil painting of beached boats (Gallery 3). Norman-born Eugène Boudin frequently painted along the Opal Coast and spent long periods in both Étaples and at Berck. Henri Le Sidaner, who was brought up in Dunkirk, spent the years 1885–1894 in the town and represented the area in all seasons. There he was joined between 1887 and 1893 by his childhood friend Eugène Chigot (1860–1923), who shared his interest in atmospheric light and afterwards went to stay in Paris Plage.

The heyday of the colony began around 1880. More than 200 artists from France, Britain, America and Australia had settled in the Étaples area. In 1887 also, Eugène Vail (1857–1934), moved to Étaples and spent the winter there, lodging with his Irish friend Frank O'Meara, whose letters home give us information about the colony at that time. Amongst the other artists working there were Boudin and Francis Tattegrain, several more Irish, the English Dudley Hardy, the Americans Walter Gay and L. Birge Harrison, and the Australian Eleanor Ritchie, whom Harrison met there and married. While the rest were painting tranquil figures down at the harbour or in the woods, O'Meara describes Vail as "painting the deck of a fishing boat in a heavy sea, life-size". This was "Ready, About!", which won a first-class gold medal in the Paris Salon of 1888. In the following decade, Vail's Norwegian associate Frits Thaulow was to spend some time in Étaples while André Derain stopped there and in Montreuil-sur-mer during the summer of 1909.

The colony that was in the process of being formed in Étaples and neighbouring villages such as Trépied, a mile away on the south bank of the river Canche, was in reality made up largely of English-speaking expatriates who needed to live cheaply. As Blanche McManus was to comment two decades later in the record of her travels, "the colony has been formed by buying up, or renting, the fishermen's cottages at nominal prices and turning them into studios. Such is the popularity of art that the native fisher people importune one to be taken on for models with as much insistence as the beggars of Naples appeal to strangers for money."

Her account is supplemented by Jane Quigley's description of life there published in 1907. "The usual plan is to live in rooms or studios and eat at the Hotel des Voyageurs or Hotel Joos – unpretentious hostelries with fairly good meals, served in an atmosphere of friendliness and stimulating talk. In winter the place is deserted, except by a group of serious workers who make it their home. Artists pay about twenty-five or thirty francs a week for board and rooms, and studios are cheap. Étaples has been called – and not without reason – a dirty little town, but it is healthy for all that. The artistic sense finds pleasure in its winding cobbled streets and mellow old houses and in the dark-complexioned southern looking people. Models are plentiful and pose well for a small payment, either in the studio or in the picturesque gardens that lie hidden behind the street doors. A great source of interest is the fishing fleet that comes up the estuary of the Canche to the quays where the fisher people and shrimpers live in a colony of their own. There is constant work for the sketch book, especially on Monday, when the boats go off for several days, the whole family helping the men and boys to start. All one can do amid this bewildering movement of boats putting up sail, and people bustling about with provisions, is to make hurried notes and sketches."

== Styles and subjects ==
A review of a 2011 exhibition in Étaples refers to the École d'Étaples and the large Étaples artist colony. The exhibition showed local paintings from between 1880 and 1914. Art ranged from the plein-air style of artists' colonies to the south, through Impressionism to Post Impressionism. Subject matter was obviously varied. However, two broad tendencies can be observed in their work. One is the treatment of light, that recommended itself to those of an Impressionist tendency, such as Boudin and Le Sidaner among the French and Wilson Steer from England. The other tendency among the artists was to follow the Realism of such painters as Jules Bastien-Lepage and Jean-François Millet in their choice of humble everyday subjects – in the case of Étaples, the life of the fisherfolk. There are good examples in the work of the American Louis Paul Dessar, who was in the town between 1886 and 1901, and the Anglo-Australian Tudor St. George Tucker, whose first major painting, "A Picardy Shrimp Fisher", was executed in Étaples. William Gerard Barry's "Time Flies" and Birge Harrison's "The Return of the Mayflower", mentioned above, are works of the same tendency.

Gallery 1: Light effects

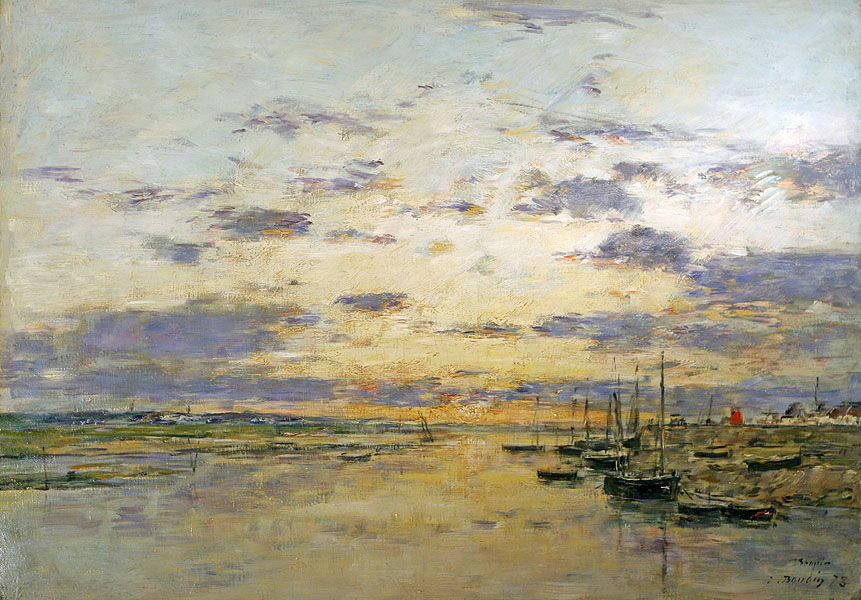
Eugène Boudin, Sunset over the Canche, 1876

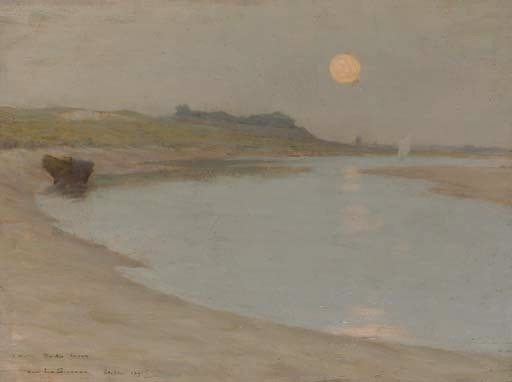
Henri Le Sidaner, Moonlight, Étaples, 1891

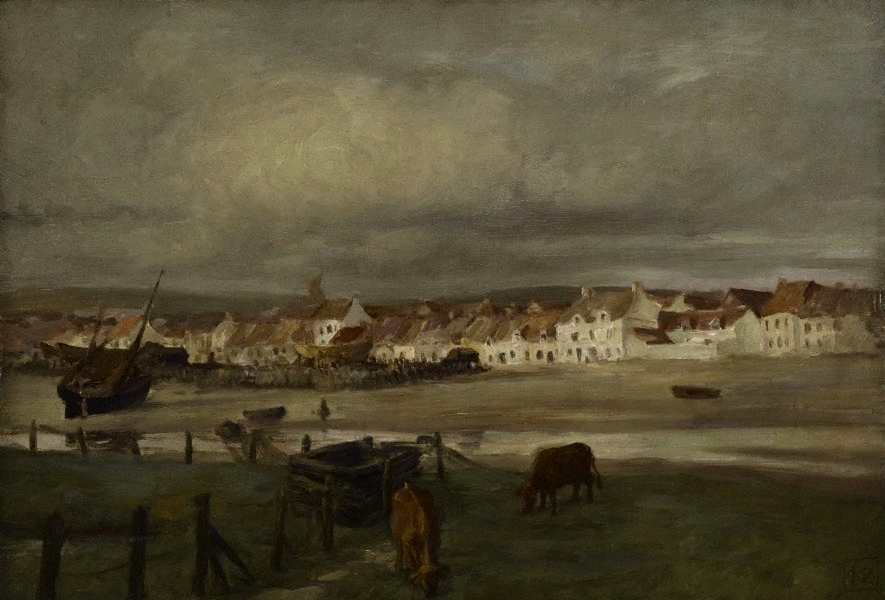
Rupert Bunny, Rainy weather at Étaples, 1902

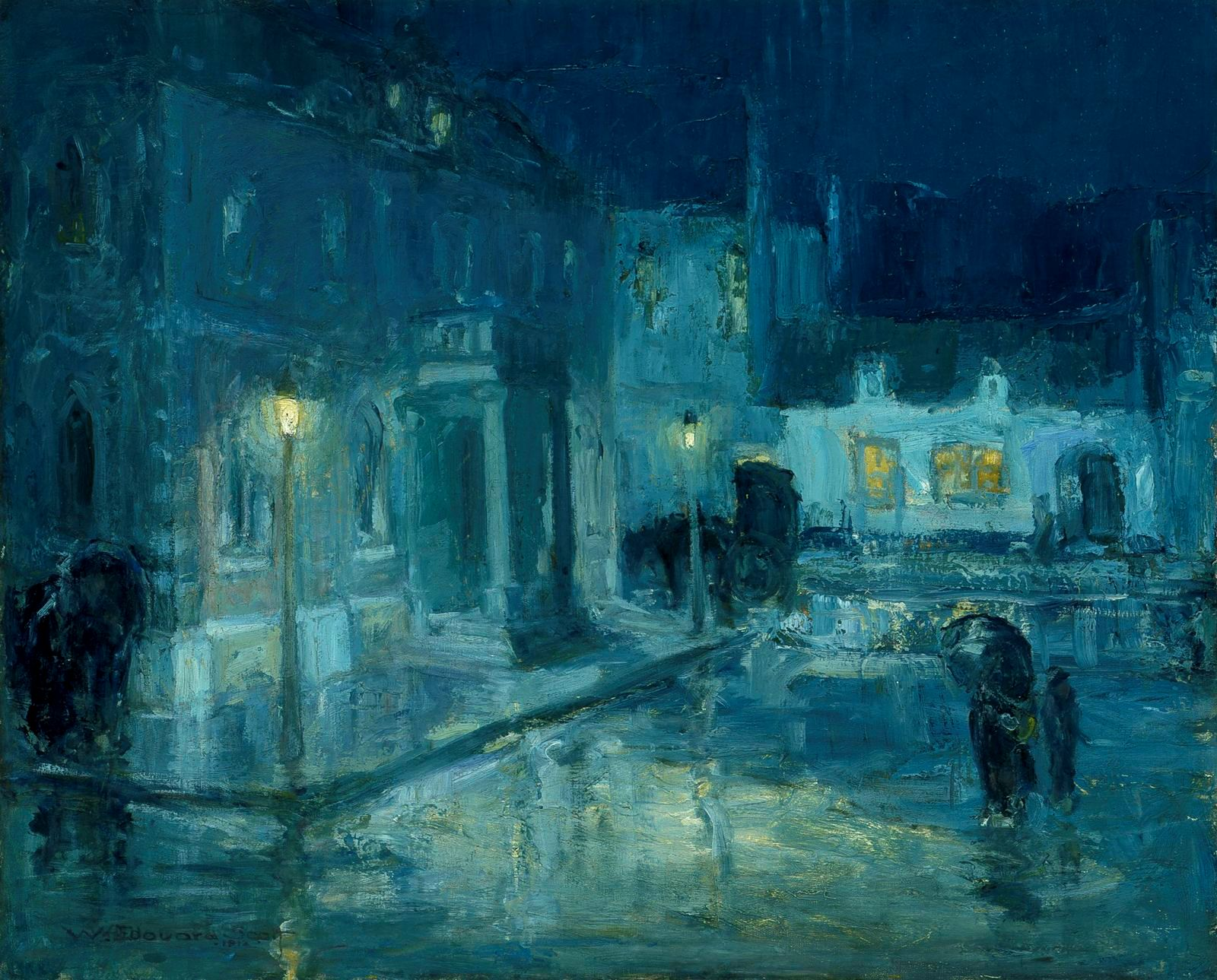
William Edouard Scott, Rainy night in Étaples, 1912

One particular focus of attention as a subject was the town's fish market, built in 1872 and now a maritime museum. Examples include "Fish Market, Etaples", shown in 1913 at the annual exhibition of the Royal Canadian Academy of Arts by Clara S. Haggarty (1871–1958), and two exhibited at the 1907 Royal Academy exhibition in England: the Australian James Peter Quinn's "Fish Market at Étaples", and "A corner of the market, Etaples" by the animal artist Evelyn Harke (fl.1899–1930). Etchings were also made, two of which are singled out in Whitman's Print Collector's Handbook (1918): Nelson Dawson's aquatint "Halles aux poisons" (1911), made after a visit to the town in 1910 and now in Georgetown University, and William Lee Hankey's "Fish Market at Étaples", now in the British Museum. The latter depicts baskets of fish on display in a stone hall with two women seated in the left foreground, bending towards one another as they talk, while men walk past them carrying baskets.

The market outside was equally popular, a subject bringing together folk in their distinctive local dress which was particularly adapted to the kind of saleable genre subjects that many of these artists were producing. It is shown in the oil paintings "Market Day" by the English William Holt Yates Titcomb (see Gallery 2), "Market at Etaples" by the Australian Marie Tuck (1866–1947 and "Market Scene at Etaples" by her compatriot Iso Rae (1860–1940). There was also the charcoal and crayon drawing "Le Marché à Etaples" by Hilda Rix (1884–1961), another Australian, and "Market Place, Étaples", a watercolour by the Irish artist Mima Nixon (1861–1939) that was displayed at the Royal Academy exhibition in 1909.

There is evidence also of a social conscience in the paintings of some artists that is manifested in the depiction of their subjects. Walter Gay's "November" might perhaps be dismissed as merely picturesque, a posed portrayal of a peasant woman at the not particularly arduous task of hoeing her cabbage patch (Gallery 4). But George Clausen's depiction of the back-breaking work of "Gathering Potatoes", painted at nearby Dannes in 1887, reflects concerns that are a constant in his output of the time. It was then too that he began to distance himself from those championing Impressionist effects precisely because drawing attention principally to technique takes it away from any other motivation for choosing the subject portrayed.

Elizabeth Nourse's "Fisher Girl of Picardy" (Gallery 2) is another example. Painted on a blustery day in 1889, Nourse's friend Anna Schmidt later described the circumstances: "I was with Elizabeth when she painted that girl on the Etaples Dunes – it was so cold and windy the model used to weep."

Gallery 2: Fisher-folk

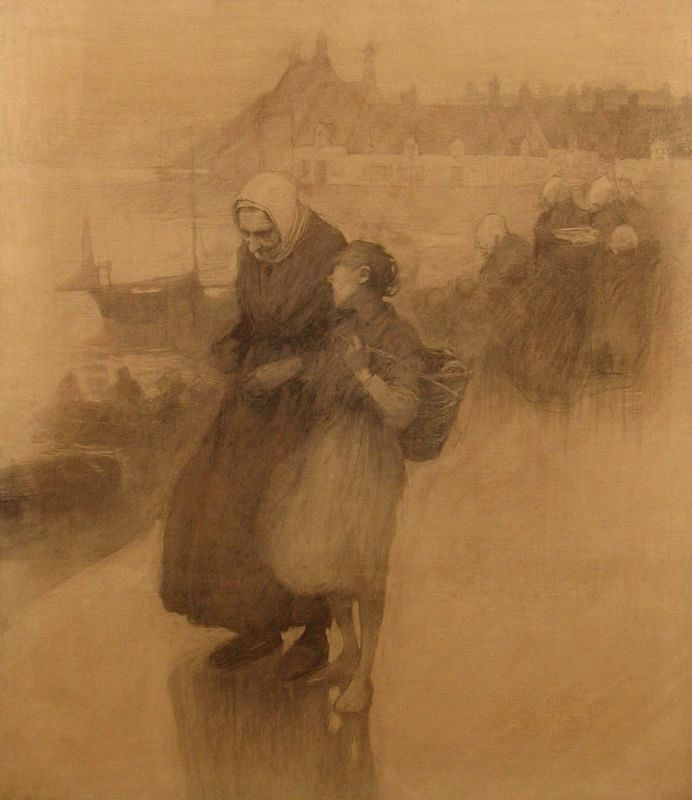
Frank O'Meara, On the quays, 1888

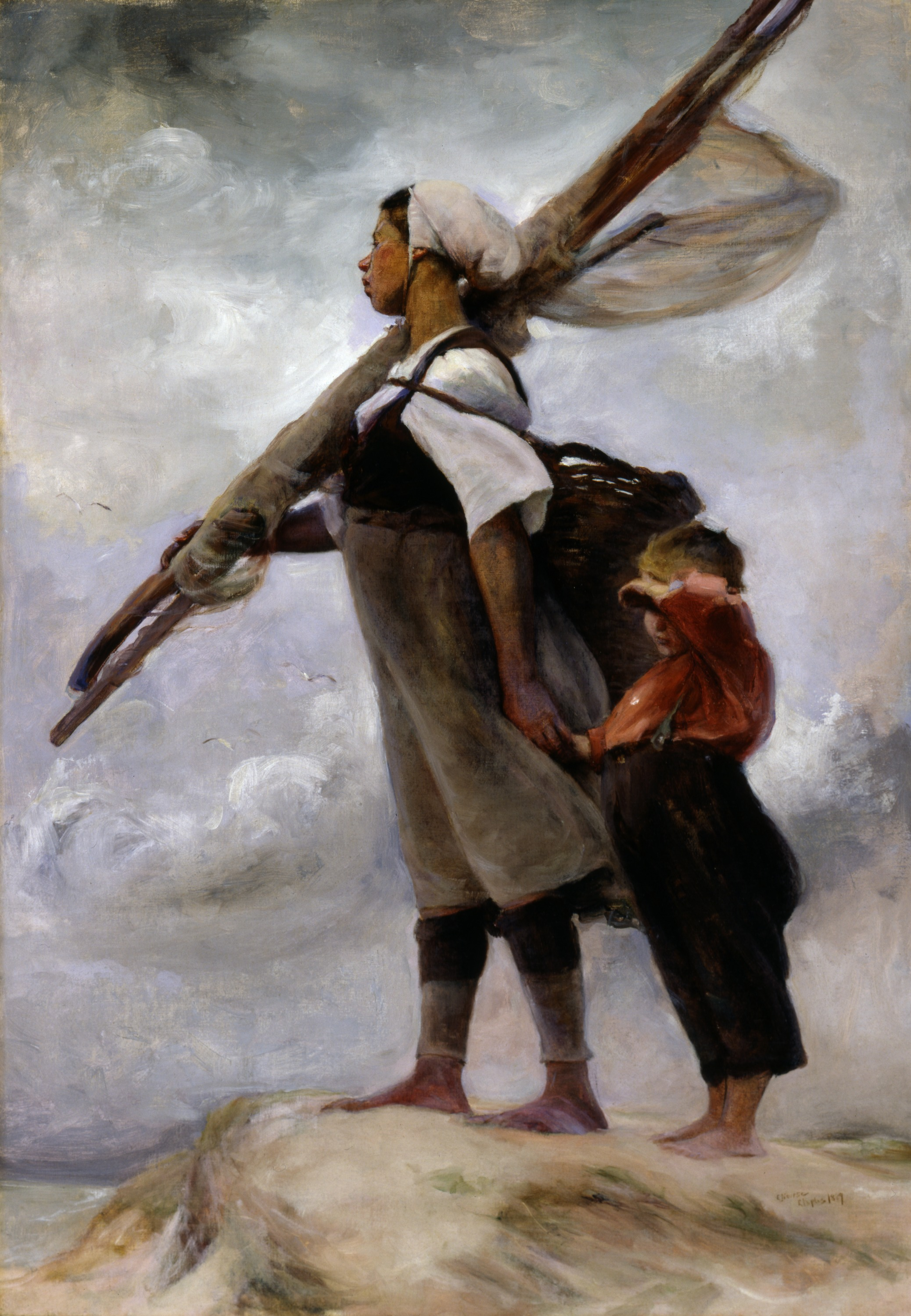
Elizabeth Nourse, Fisher Girl of Picardy, 1889

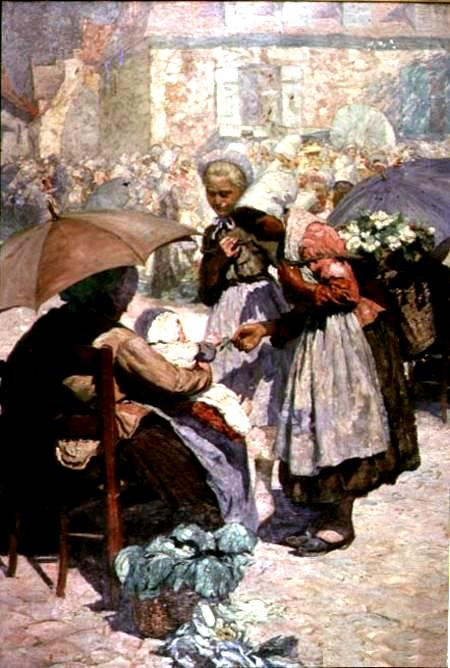
William Holt Yates Titcomb, Market Day, Étaples

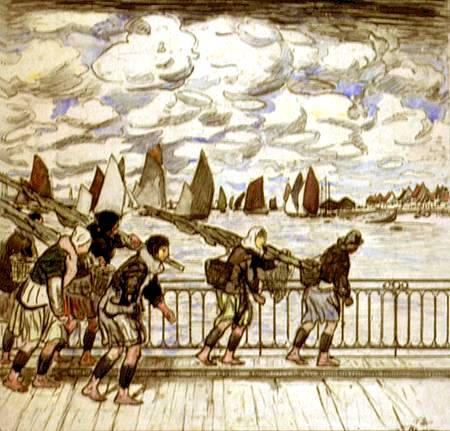
Thomas Austen Brown, Shrimpers returning

== Nationalities ==
a) Americans

The painters of two of the colony's nationalities, Americans and Australians, have been the subject of special studies. Among the earliest Americans to visit the town were Walter Gay, who was making a name for himself with Realist subjects at the time, and Robert Reid, whose long career as a painter of young women in outside settings began with portraits of peasants in Étaples before his return to the U.S. in 1889. Another early visitor was Homer Dodge Martin, who was painting on the coast between 1882 and 1886. His work included a topographical view of the harbour (Gallery 3).

In 1889 the Paris-based salon genre painter, Elizabeth Nourse, included the town on her tour. She created paintings there including "Milk Carrier", "Fisher Girl of Picardy", "An Etaples Fair" and "Street Scene". Later on Eanger Couse moved to the town and lived there between 1893 and 1896, painting its streets and fisher folk. His "Coastal Scene, Etaples" is particularly worth noting for its interpretation of light. Myron Barlow (1873–1937) also had a home in Étaples from the late 1890s to his death and specialised particularly in figures in interiors. Among his students there was Norwood Hodge MacGilvary (1874–1949), who studied under him in the years 1904–6.

Max Bohm lived in the area between 1895 and 1904. Described as a romantic visionary, his heroic depiction of Étaples fishermen, "En Mer" (see Gallery 3), received a gold medal at the Paris Salon in 1898. He then moved out of the town to Trépied and while there founded the Société Artistique de Picardie which took over arranging the annual exhibitions of work by local artists started in 1892 by Eugène Chigot. In 1912 the society's president was George Senseney (1874-1943), who was listed as still living in Etaples in a catalogue of works by American etchers the following year.

In 1913 Senseney was succeeded as president by the African-American artist Henry Ossawa Tanner, who had been driven abroad by prejudice and had settled in Trépied. Early in his career, Tanner painted marine scenes that showed man's struggle with the sea, but by 1895 he was creating mostly religious works. The simple resources at Étaples were well adapted to his subject matter, which in several cases featured Biblical figures in dark interiors. Occasionally Tanner played host at Trépied to a fellow African-American, William Edouard Scott, who painted there off and on between 1910 and 1914. In fact Tanner's son claims that he was largely responsible for establishing the foreign artistic milieu at Etaples, often entertaining up to 100 people at his Trépied summer home.

Also staying in the village during this decade was Max Bohm's friend Chauncey Ryder (1868-1949). As soon as he quitted the farmhouse he was renting in 1907, he was succeeded there by the landscape artist Roy Brown (1879–1956), who was to stay until war broke out in 1914.

Other visitors to the area included the landscapist George W. Picknell (1864–1943) and the maritime artist John "Wichita Bill" Noble (1874–1934), both of whom spent some years in France at that time. Of the other painters of marine subjects associated with the town, Frederick Frary Fursman (1874–1943) spent summers there between 1906 and 1909 while Augustus Koopman (1869–1914) kept a studio in Étaples from 1908 and died there in 1914. Yet another visitor was Caleb Arnold Slade (1882-1961), who made annual stays for some seven years until 1915. His "Moonlight at Etaples" looks over the glimmering Canche to the silhouetted buildings of Trépied on the ridge behind and justifies his description as an American Impressionist.

Students were attracted into the area to study with some of these artists. Writing in 1907, Jane Quigley testified of Max Bohm that "He attracts a following of students by his power as a teacher and the vigorous and sincere personality which exacts good work from all who come under his influence". This was certainly so of the New Zealand artist Samuel Hales (1868–1953), whose painting "La Nuit" was exhibited at the Paris Salon in 1897. A later student was the English Jessica Dismorr, who studied with Bohm in 1904 and went on to adopt a Fauvist and then a Vorticist style.

Gallery 3: Boats

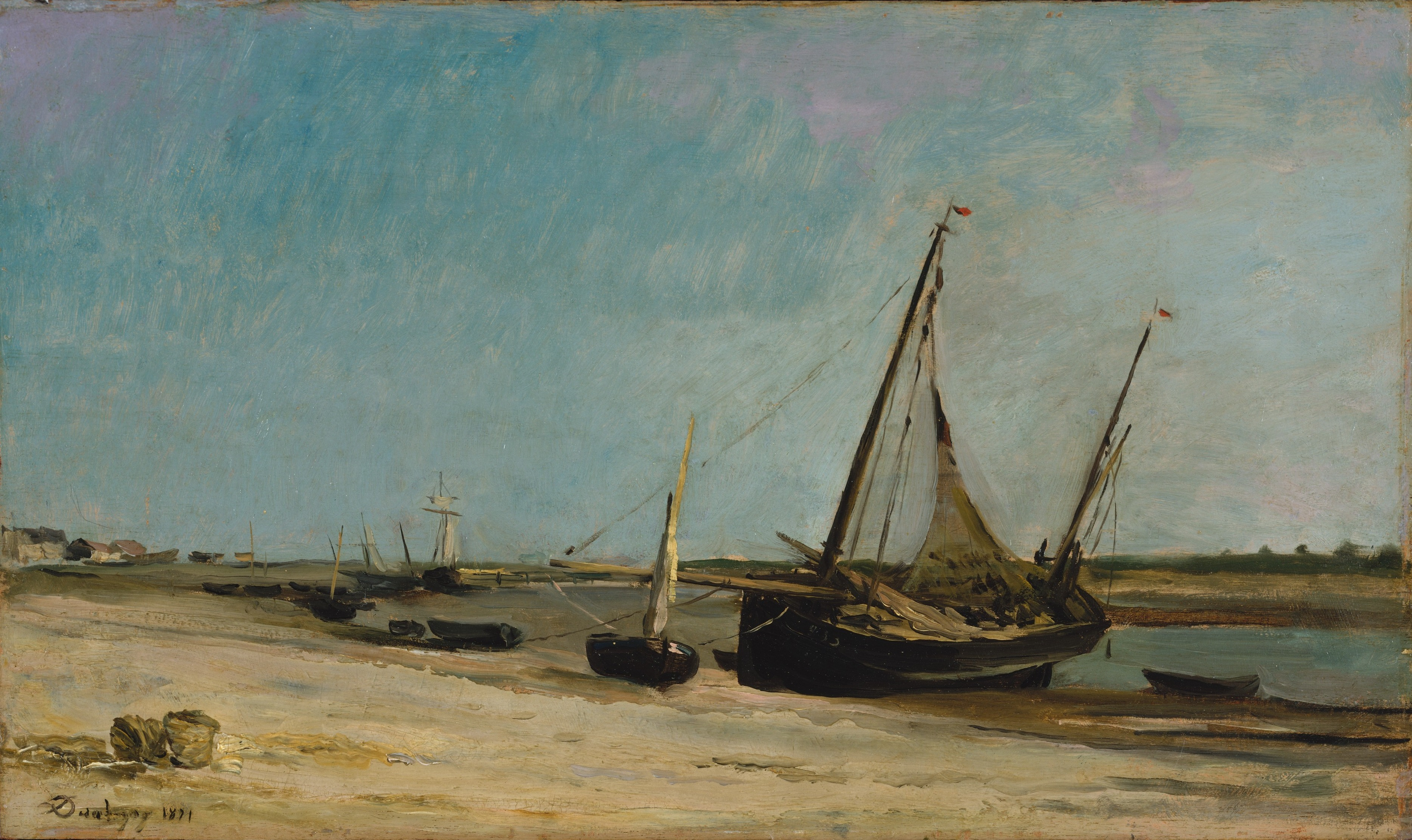
Charles-François Daubigny, Boats on the strand at Étaples, 1871

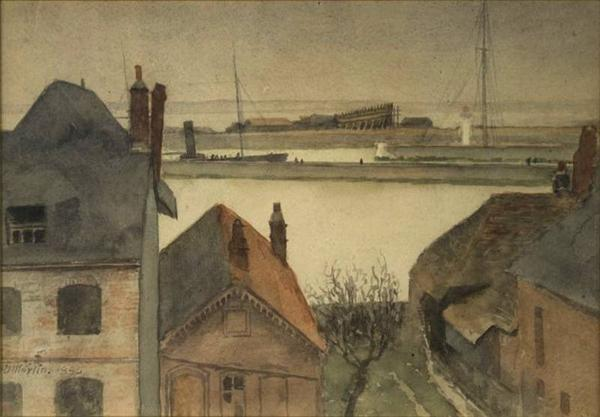
Homer Martin, The harbour at Étaples, c. 1884

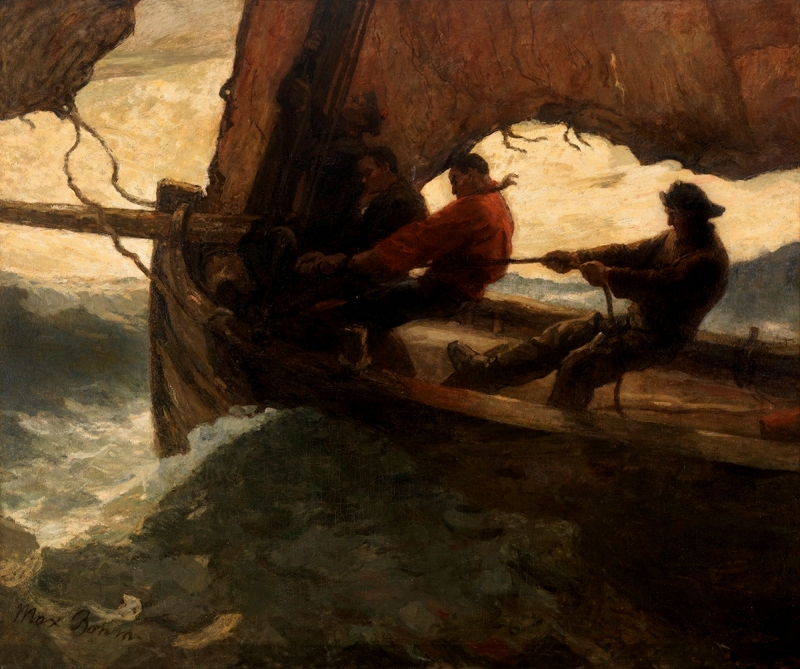
Max Bohm, At Sea, 1898

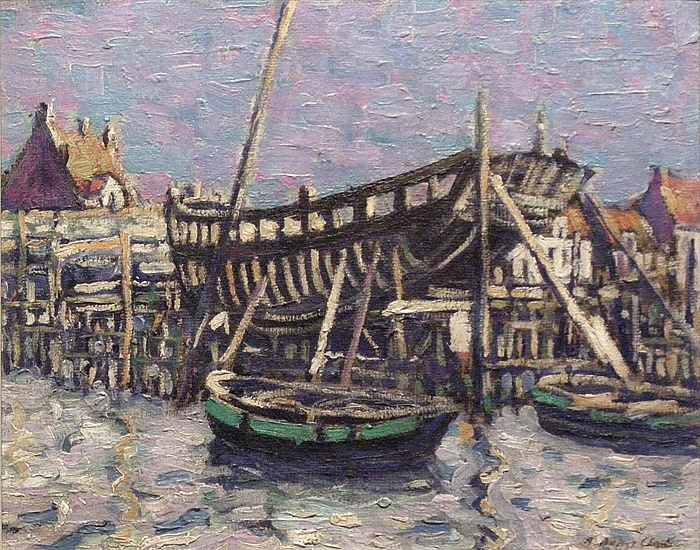
Arthur Baker-Clack, The Boat Yard, 1913

b) British colonials

While Bohm taught in Étaples, the Australian artist Rupert Bunny did most of his teaching in Paris. But between 1893 and 1907 he was a frequent visitor and has left some memorable paintings, among them the atmospheric "Light on the Canche" and "Low tide at Étaples", both dating from 1902, the same year as "Rainy weather at Étaples" (Gallery 1). Among the students that followed him down was his fellow countrywoman Marie Tuck (1866–1947), who paid for her tuition by cleaning out his studio and came to live in Étaples between 1907 and 1914, and Arthur Baker-Clack (1877–1955), another Australian, who settled in Trépied in 1910. While there he painted a local thatched cottage, "Le Chaumine", and "The boat yard" in Étaples in Neo-Impressionist style (Gallery 3).

Some twenty-five antipodean painters, twenty-two Australians and three New Zealanders, are mentioned in Jean-Claude Lesage's study. Among them was E. Phillips Fox, who was connected with several of the French artists' colonies and the plein air style associated with them. Two Australian women are particularly notable: Iso(bel) Rae (1860–1940), who joined the colony in 1890 and exhibited in the Paris Salons, and Emily Hilda Rix (1884–1961), who maintained a studio in Étaples between 1911 and 1914. While there she executed the paintings "An old peasant woman in my garden", later bought by the National Gallery of Victoria, "Picardy Girl" (1913) and the pastel drawing "There is a Dear Old Fairy Godmother who Poses for Us". There were also New Zealand women artists painting together during this time, including Frances Hodgkins, Grace Joel (1865–1924) and Constance Jenkins Macky.

Another New Zealand visitor was Eric Spencer Macky (1880–1958), who went on to make a career for himself in the United States. Macky had arrived with his Canadian friend A. Y. Jackson and they took a studio together between May and December 1908. Jackson painted his "Paysage embrumée" then and, rather to his surprise, it was accepted by the Paris Salon. Returning in 1912, he stayed in Trépied and painted with Arthur Baker-Clack. From this period date the Neo-Impressionist "Sand dunes at Cucq" and "Autumn in Picardy", which was bought by the National Gallery of Canada the following year. He was next to see Étaples in 1916, when taken to the hospital there after being wounded in World War I. A fellow Canadian painting in the town was the Welsh-born Robert Harris, who followed the Impressionist fascination with railway architecture and made the railway bridge over the Canche one of his subjects in 1911.

Gallery 4: Exteriors

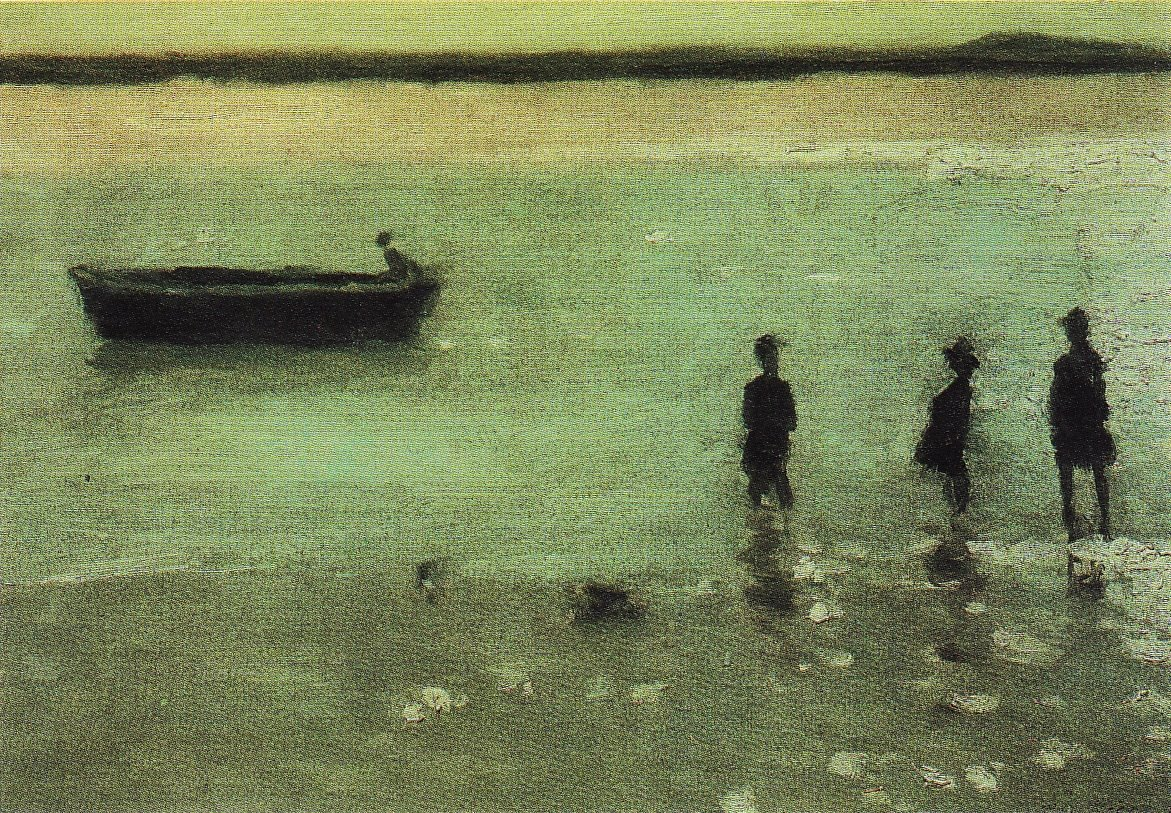
Philip Wilson Steer, Beach at Étaples, 1887

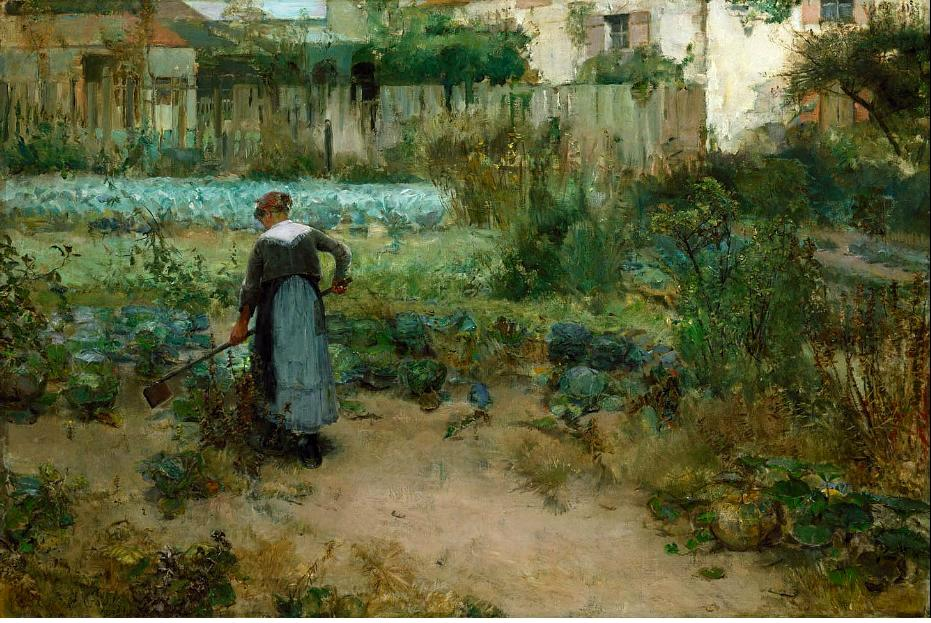
Walter Gay, November – Étaples, 1885

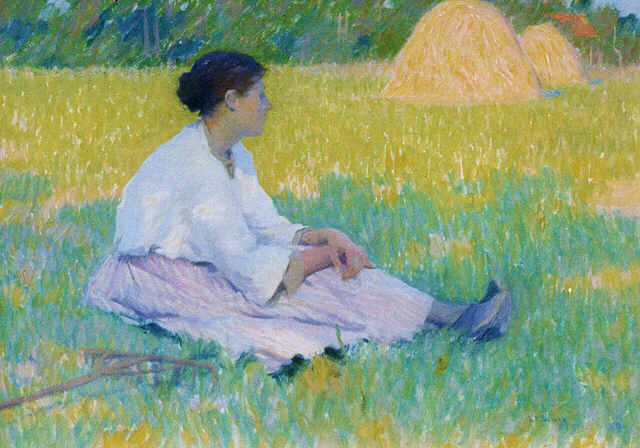
Louis Paul Dessar, Summer Sunlight, 1894

c) British and Irish

The only considerable English painter connected with Étaples was Philip Wilson Steer, who spent some time there in 1887. His misty Impressionist style is striking in such paintings as "The Beach" (Gallery 4) and "Fisher Children". Another work for which he certainly made a preliminary study while there, "The Bridge", is now considered to have been painted in Walberswick, the English estuary town to which he next moved. Other painters are mainly of topographical interest. Dudley Hardy (1866–1922) captured an evening effect in a watercolour of 1888, looking from the south side of the Canche and showing the windmills that dominated the town at that period. Nora Cundell (1889–1948) takes us into the back parlour of the Cafe Loos, through the doorway of which one can see a few artist types at table.

One English artist who visited the area over many years from 1904 onwards was William Lee Hankey. Eventually he was to have a house built in Le Touquet and maintain a studio at Étaples. His paintings include land- and seascapes such as "The Harbour", and figure studies like "Mother and Child" and "The Goose Girl". But it was his black and white and coloured etchings of the people of the town, several developed from these paintings, which gained him a reputation as "one of the most gifted of the figurative printmakers working in original drypoint during the first thirty years of the 20th century". Several other makers of fine colour prints also stayed in Étaples, including the marine painter Nelson Dawson, four of whose prints resulting from his visit in 1910 are in the collection of his work at Georgetown University, and the pioneer of Japanese-style woodblock printing, Frank Morley-Fletcher, who pictured the road from Trépied in 1910 (Gallery 5).

Among the Scots, three of the four Post-Impressionist painters known as the Scottish Colourists worked in the area. The two friends John Duncan Fergusson and Samuel Peploe regularly painted together at Paris Plage between 1904 and 1909 on visits which also included sessions in Étaples. Leslie Hunter, the other member of this trio, only began to make a name for himself after the works he produced during his visit to Étaples in 1914 identified him too as a colourist. They included paintings of figures on the beach and a study of "Fishing boats in the harbour". A rather more permanent resident in the area was the slightly older Scot, Thomas Austen Brown (1857–1924), who was living in the nearby village of Camiers to the north and whose work was characteristically Impressionist. His "Sunshine and Shadow", a view of Étaples through the trees on the south bank of the Canche, is in this style while his "Shrimpers Returning" (Gallery 2) verges on the Neo-Impressionist. Brown was also a notable maker of prints and in 1919 published his Étaples: Pictures, which included 28 tipped-in illustrations, of which ten were in colour.

Gallery 5: Prints

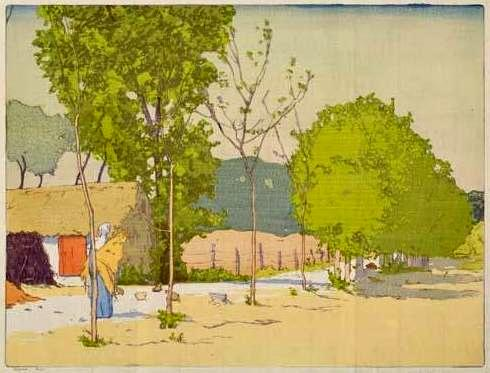
Frank Fletcher, Trépied, 1910

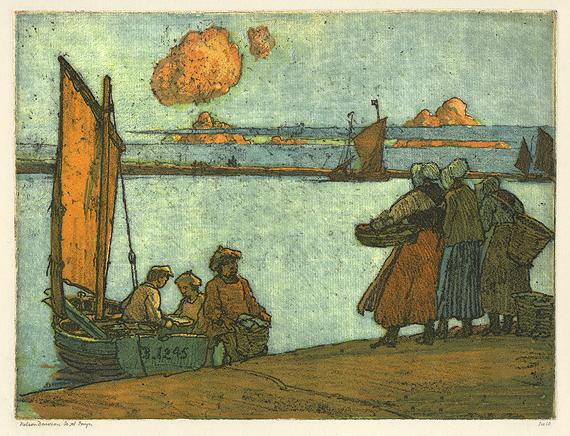
Nelson Dawson, 3 fisherwomen from Étaples, 1912

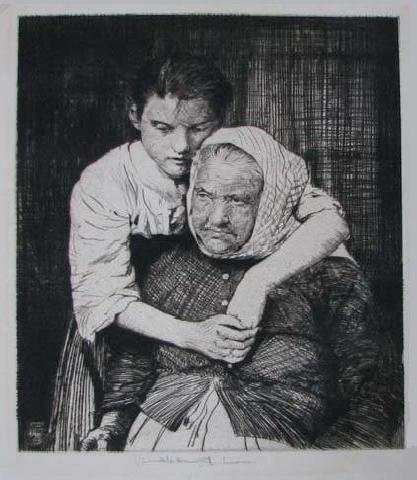
William Lee Hankey, Étaples fisherfolk, 1920

Among those painters known as Irish Impressionists were the peripatetic William Gerard Barry and the short-lived Frank O'Meara, whose early visit to Étaples has already been mentioned. Another of this group was Barry's protégé Harry Scully, who stopped in the town in 1896 but was identified with many other art colonies as well. Sarah Cecilia Harrison, noted for her paintings of children and landscapes, was there in 1890 and her "On the road to Étaples" was exhibited at the Royal Hibernian Academy the following year. In 1898 Edith Somerville was painting in the town, companioned by her friend Violet Martin. In this case, though, they profited from their stay by conceiving together the stories gathered in Some Experiences of an Irish R. M. (1899). In the following decade Edward Millington Synge (1866-1913) passed some of the winter there and executed "The Thaw, Etaples" (1909), a watercolour of a muddy lane under trees with "pale yellow sky, purple hills, dull red roof, grey and purple roadway, all obscured by patches of half melted snow". Also noted for etching, his print of a winter sunset also dates from this stay. The previous year he had married Freda Molony (1869–1924), whose name was mentioned at this period as among those painting in the town and as a successful exhibitor at the Royal Academy. Among her paintings was one of "The Blessing of the Fishing Fleet" at Étaples (1906).

Gallery 6: Interiors

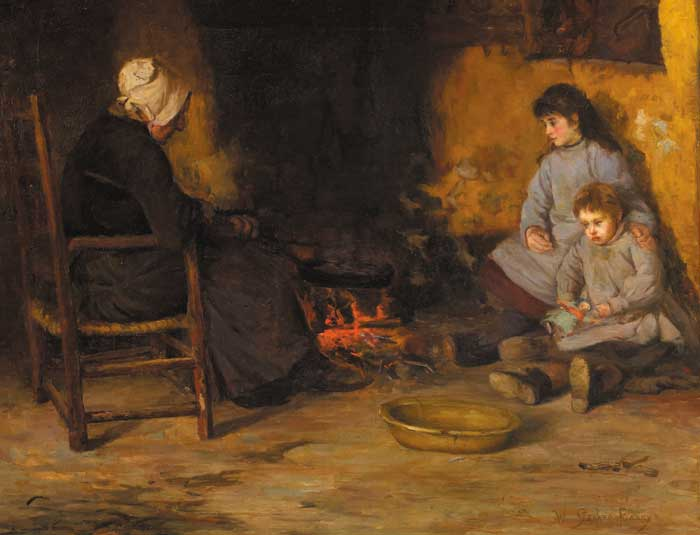
William Gerard Barry, An old woman and children in a cottage interior, 1887

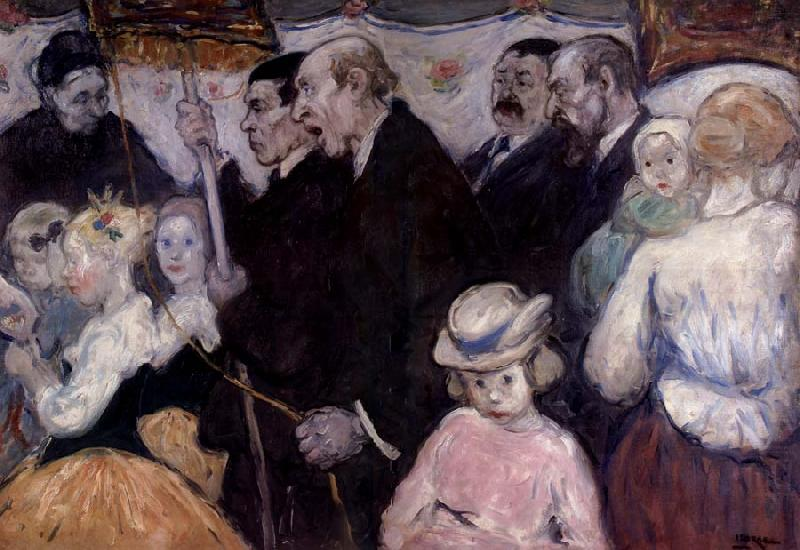
Iso Rae, Rogation Sunday, 1913

== Aftermath ==
With the outbreak of war, the artists in the colony scattered elsewhere.

Some American artists also hung on for a while. Writing in the New York Times in February 1915, the newly returned Arnold Slade gave an account of the military build-up in the area. He also mentioned how American artists in the town had volunteered for 12-hour shifts feeding troops as they passed through the station. But almost the only artist to stay on in Étaples throughout the war and record the military activity there was Iso Rae. While working for the Voluntary Aid Detachment (VAD) of the British Red Cross between 1915 and 1919, she produced about 200 pastel drawings of the army camp and the life of the soldiers there.

Another medical volunteer connected with the camp was the Yorkshireman Fred Lawson (1888–1968), who painted a watercolour of the town. There were also a few who painted among those in uniform. William McDougall Anderson (1883–1917) was a Scottish stained glass artist who served as a lance corporal and made a few studies while passing through Étaples in October 1916.

Two war artists were present during the German air raid on Étaples in May 1918 which also targeted the hospitals. Austin Spare, who was in the Royal Army Medical Corps, recorded the scene of devastation left by the raid. J. Hodgson Lobley (1878–1954), also serving in the RAMC at the time, pictured men constructing an underground dug-out which would serve as a shelter. John Lavery, one of the official British war artists, had been prevented by illness from leaving the country during the war but visited Étaples in 1919. Moved by the sight of the war cemetery that was served then only by a few women VADs, before it was officially designated by the War Graves Commission, he painted it in its sandy starkness. He also painted the officers' convalescent home over the bridge in privileged Le Touquet.

Soldier poets also passed through the camp at Étaples, among them Wilfred Owen, who commented unfavourably upon it. The author J.R.R. Tolkien "wrote a poem about England" while passing through on his way to the front in 1915. C.S. Lewis was injured in 1918 and wrote many of the poems in his Spirits in Bondage (1919) while in the Liverpool Merchants Mobile Hospital at Étaples. A longer-term resident was Iso Rae's fellow volunteer, Vera Brittain, whose Verses of a V.A.D. (1918) was written while working in the military hospital and drew on her experiences there. Muriel Stuart also devoted a poem to the town in her first collection, which included several references to the war:

'Étaples', a strange, vague word
Spelled on the lips of the guns
Where all that our wild hearts loved
Went through with the regiment once!

A few resident artists from the colony came back after the war, among them Myron Barlow, Arthur Baker-Clack and Henry Tanner, who had been working for the American Red Cross in France. In 1923 he was made a knight of the Legion of Honour for his work as an artist – as was Barlow in 1932. Iso Rae moved out of Étaples to Trépied, where she stayed until 1932, with Tanner as a neighbour. Tanner's biographer records, "life at Trépied was never to be what it had been before the war. An artists' colony still existed...but something was missing. Many of the old crowd did not return and those who did were less in step with the times."
