= Iso Rae =

Australian artist (1860–1940)

- Born: Isobel Rae; 18 August 1860; Melbourne, Colony of Victoria
- Died: 16 March 1940 (aged 79); Brighton, England
- Education: National Gallery of Victoria Art School, Melbourne; Victorian Academy of Arts, Melbourne
- Known for: Painting, drawing
- Notable work: Rogation Sunday (1913)
- Movement: Impressionism

Isobel Rae (18 August 1860 – 16 March 1940) was an Australian-born impressionist painter who lived and worked most of her life in Europe.

After training at Melbourne's National Gallery of Victoria Art School, where she studied alongside Frederick McCubbin and Jane Sutherland, Rae travelled to France in 1887 with her family, and spent most of the rest of her life there. A long-standing member of the Étaples art colony, Rae lived in or near the village of Étaples from the 1890s until the 1930s. During that period, Rae exhibited her paintings at the Royal Society of British Artists, the Society of Oil Painters, and the Paris Salon.

During World War I, she was a member of the Voluntary Aid Detachment and worked throughout the war in Étaples Army Base Camp. She and Jessie Traill were the only Australian women to live and paint in France during the war, but they were not included in their country's first group of official war artists. Following Hitler's rise to power, Rae moved to south-eastern England, where she died in 1940.

== Early life and training ==
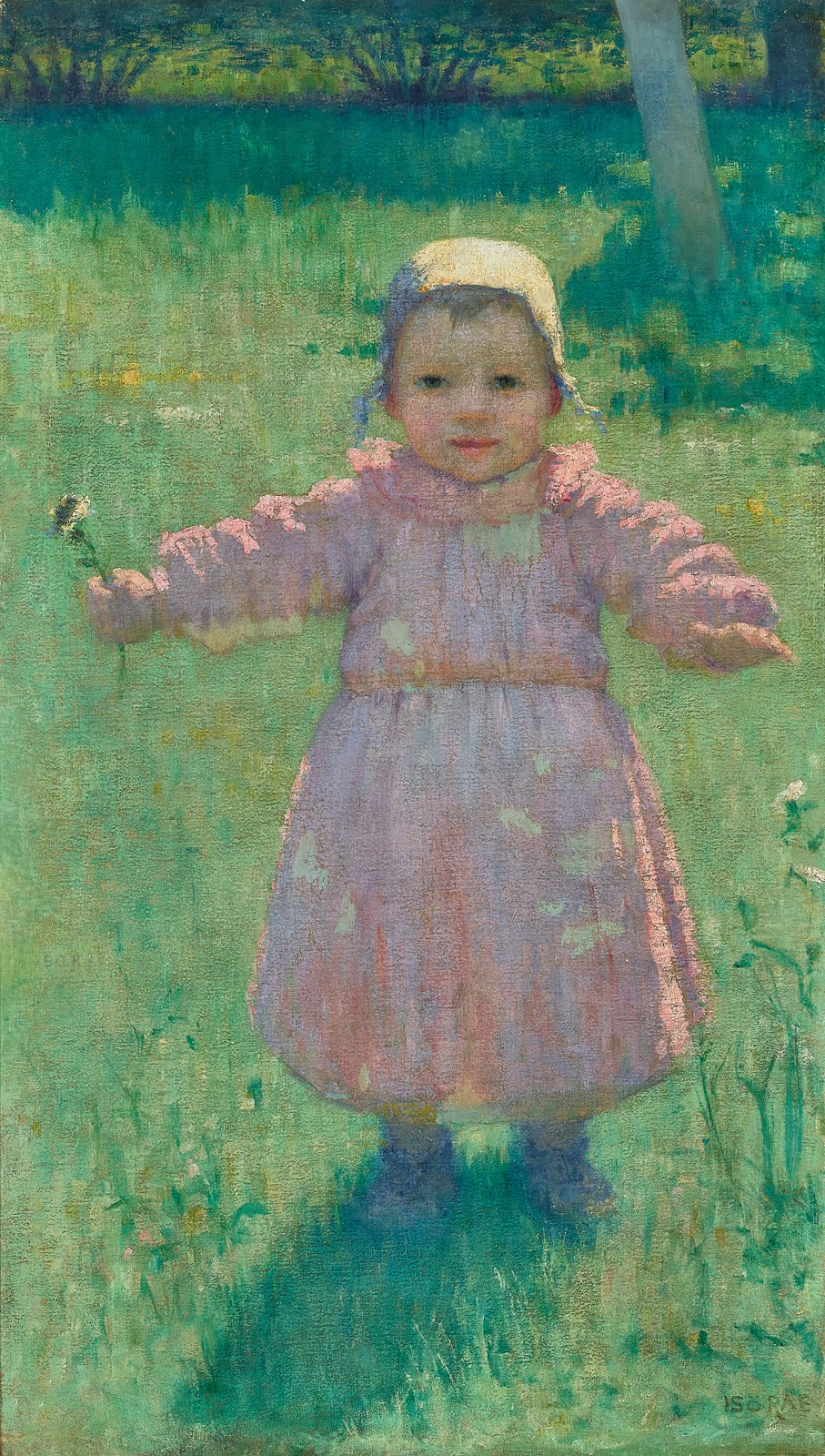
Young Girl, Étaples, 1892, National Gallery of Victoria

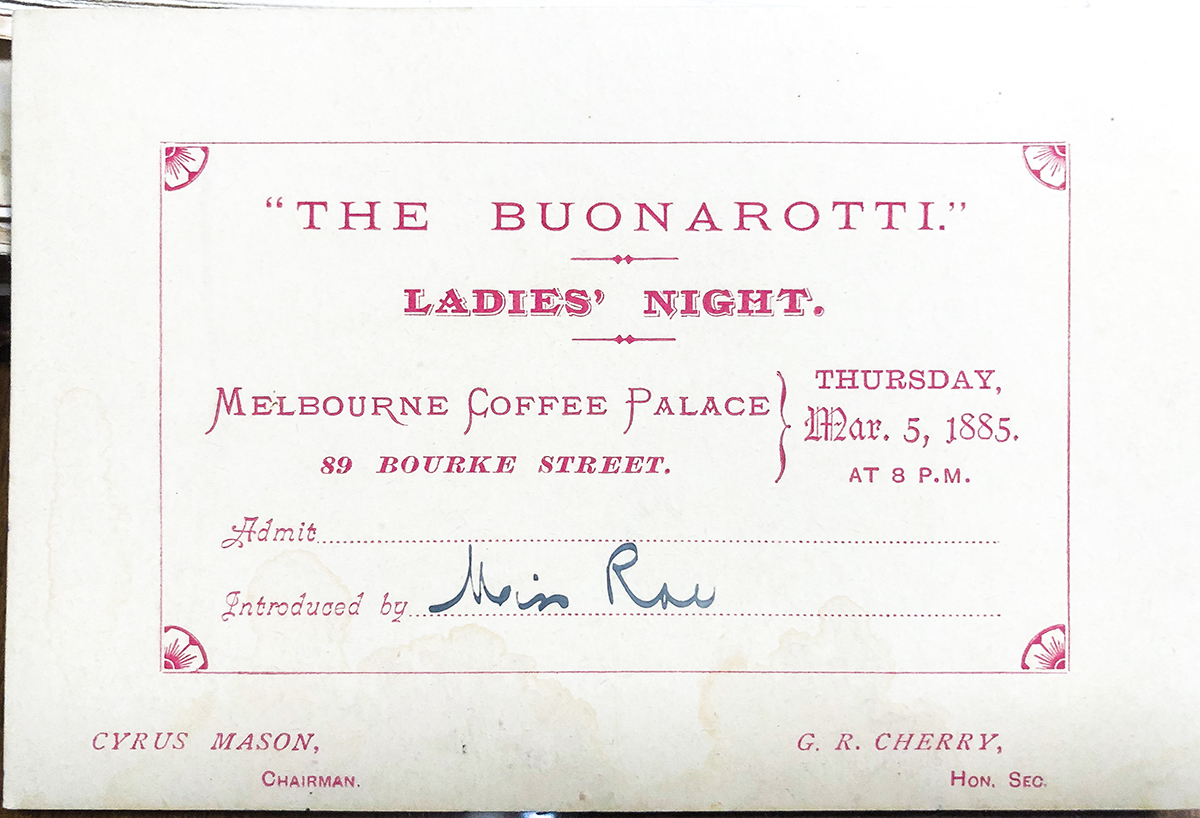
Original copy of "The Buonarotti" Ladies Night guest entry card made out to Miss (Iso) Rae. Mason Firth & McCutcheon. Printers, Melbourne 1885. Private Collection

Rae was born on 18 August 1860 in Melbourne, youngest daughter of Scottish emigrants Thomas Rae, a manufacturer and later a state politician, and his wife Janet Love. She was the granddaughter of the Reverend Andrew Love and Catherine Love of Geelong, Victoria, Australia. Rae studied at the National Gallery of Victoria Art School from 1877 to 1887, where fellow students included Rupert Bunny and John Longstaff. Her teachers included George Folingsby and Oswald Rose Campbell. Rae had some academic success in student exhibitions, receiving prizes and recognition from the judging panel on several occasions, alongside fellow students such as Longstaff, Frederick McCubbin, Jane Sutherland and May Vale. Rae joined, and exhibited with, the Victorian Academy of Arts between 1881 and 1883. Subsequently, she joined the Buonarotti Club's creative intellectual and social activities and plein air artist camps.

In 1887, Rae travelled to France and settled in Paris with her mother Janet and sister Alison. They lived there for three years, before the family moved to the artists' colony at the fishing village of Étaples, in northern coastal France. During this initial part of her career, Rae exhibited works in Australia and New Zealand, though she remained in Europe. Exhibitions in which she was hung included the 1889 New Zealand and South Seas Exhibition in Dunedin, and the 1896 Victorian Artists' Society, at which several of her landscapes were shown.

== Career ==
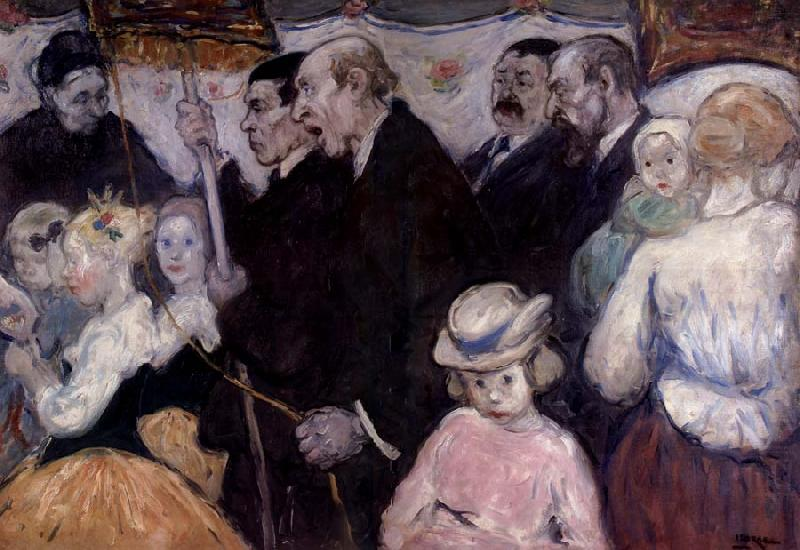
Rogation Sunday (1913)

Rae became a long-term resident at the Étaples colony. There she worked alongside a number of other Australian artists including Hilda Rix Nicholas, Rupert Bunny, Tudor St George Tucker, James Peter Quinn, Edward Officer, E. Phillips Fox and his wife Ethel Carrick, and others who took an interest in the Australians' work, such as Frenchman Jules Adler. In the late 1890s Rae exhibited regularly at the Royal Society of British Artists and the then Society of Oil Painters. Her works were sometimes of everyday scenes: she won third prize in her graduating year with a painting "of a Chinese hawker displaying his wares to two girls standing at a kitchen door", while two decades later exhibited in Australia a picture of a working-class girl carting water at dusk.

While living in Étaples, Rae exhibited regularly at the Paris Salon, with her success reported in the Australian press. She had works hung on many occasions, always in what was referred to as the New Salon, including 1908, 1909, 1910, (Note: In which year she was bizarrely recorded as being a male Tasmanian sculptor.) 1911, 1912, 1913, and 1914. On some of the later occasions, her sister Alison's works were also included.

When World War I broke out some Australians, such as Rix Nicholas, fled to England, however Rae stayed and became, along with Jessie Traill, one of only two Australian women artists to portray the war while living in France. When in 1918 Australia first appointed official war artists, sixteen men were chosen; Rae, despite having lived in France for the duration of the conflict, was not included. She nevertheless documented prolifically the experience of the war in her adopted home town, creating over two hundred drawings. Most of these portrayed the Étaples Army Base Camp, "the largest of its kind ever established overseas by the British", which at its zenith housed 100,000, including hospital services for up to 22,000 patients. Most of the drawings are of nocturnal scenes, possibly because during the war Rae and her sister both worked in the Voluntary Aid Detachment, and would have had little spare time during the days. Few of these works were acquired by public galleries, with art historian Sasha Grishin arguing that they were "generally regarded as too intimate, too personal and too feminine to be included".

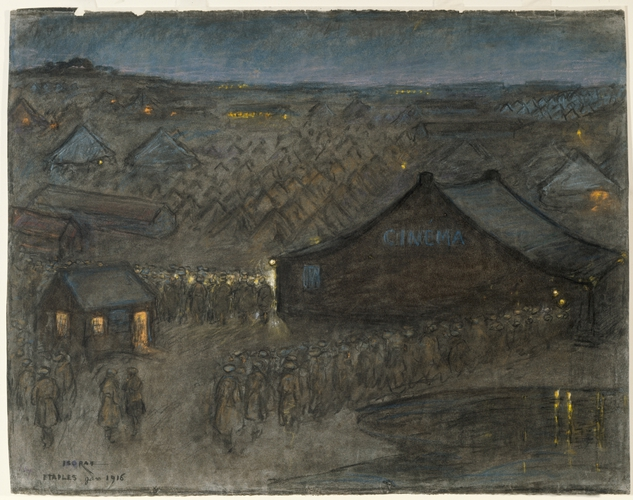
Cinema Queue, a pastel and gouache on grey paper, showing a scene at Étaples Army Base Camp, 1916

Museum curator Betty Snowden reviewed the collection of World War I drawings. She observed the influence of the post-impressionist movement to which Rae was exposed when first she came to France, and her attention to the regimentation and tensions of camp life. Snowden wrote:

In her drawings she uses black outlines filled with flat areas of colour, a post-impressionist technique reminiscent of some of the French poster artists of the late nineteenth century...The regular patterning of men, tents and buildings in many of the works suggests the control that was imposed by the vast machine of men and modern war. In many drawings there is a strong sense of waiting: waiting to move into battle, waiting for the war to end, waiting to be sent home.

The Australian War Memorial holds eleven of Rae's works, including Cinema Queue, which Snowden described as a "dramatic elevated night scene, with her use of strong glowing light against the deep black of the night, and gouache over pastel used to highlight the glow of lights in the dark. The long line of men waiting reflects a general mood of waiting prevalent in the camp – and suggests that here even entertainment is dark and regimented." A similarly foreboding work, Night Patrol, is held in the collection of the Art Gallery of New South Wales.

Rae's mother died in France during the war. The sisters remained there until the 1930s, when Hitler's rise to power prompted them to relocate to England, where they settled in St Leonards-on-Sea, in Sussex. Rae died on 16 March 1940 at Brighton Mental Hospital in Brighton.

== Legacy ==
Reviewers' assessment of Rae's work varied. She was criticised for allowing her impressionist style to become extreme and visually distracting from her subjects, but that same approach was seen by another critic as charming, and exhibiting "harmonious colour and vigorous effects".

Rae is not included in Max Germaine's Dictionary of Women Artists in Australia, Caroline Ambrus's The Ladies' Picture Show, or Helen Topliss's Modernism and Feminism: Australian Women Artists 1900–1940. Nevertheless, the secondary market for Rae's works has been relatively strong, with one work selling in 2012 for 10,000 Euros, as against a pre-auction estimate of two-thirds that sum.

== Collections ==
- National Gallery of Australia
- Art Gallery of New South Wales
- National Gallery of Victoria
- Australian War Memorial
- Musée du Touquet, Étaples

== Bibliography ==
- Ambrus, Caroline (1984). The Ladies' Picture Show: Sources on a century of Australian women artists. Sydney: Hale & Iremonger. ISBN 0-86806-160-3.
- Eagle, Mary; Jones, John (1994). A Story of Australian Painting. Chippendale, NSW: Macmillan Australia. ISBN 0-7329-0778-0.
- Germaine, Max (1991). A Dictionary of Women Artists of Australia. Roseville East, NSW: Craftsman House. ISBN 976-8097-13-2.
- Gray, Anne (1995). "Isobel Rae". In Joan Kerr and Anita Callaway (ed.). Heritage: The National Women's Art Book. Roseville East, NSW: G + B Arts International / Craftsman House. p. 434. ISBN 976-641-045-3.
- Grishin, Sasha (2013). Australian Art: A History. Carlton, VIC: The Miegunyah Press. ISBN 978-0-522-85652-1.
- Pigot, John (2000). Hilda Rix Nicholas: Her Life and Art. Carlton South, Victoria: The Miegunyah Press at Melbourne University Press. ISBN 0-522-84890-7.
- Topliss, Helen (1996). Modernism and Feminism: Australian Women Artists 1900–1940. Roseville East, NSW: Craftsman House. ISBN 976-641-025-9.
