= William Lee Hankey =

English painter

The Knitting Lesson, c. 1914, Musée d’Orsay, on loan to the Musée d’art et d’industrie de Roubaix (La Piscine).

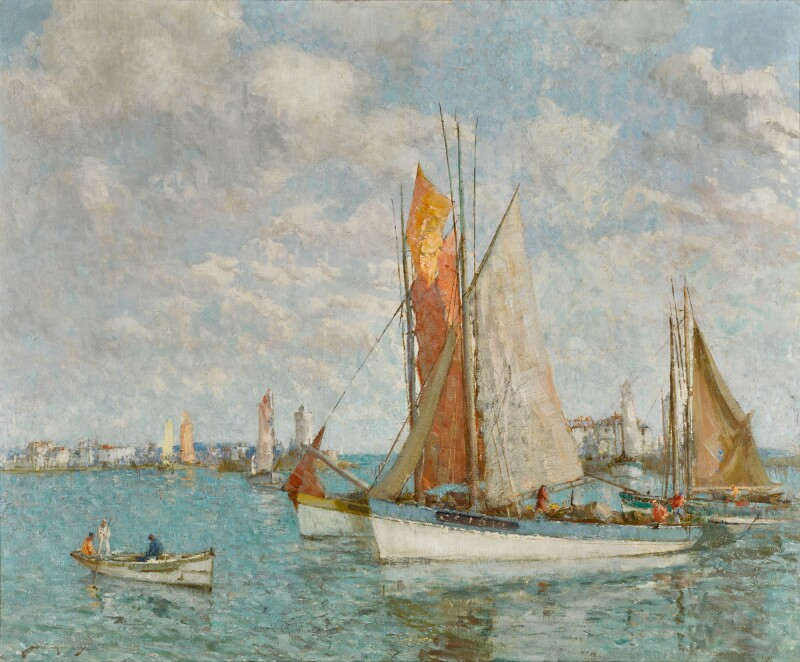
At Concarneau, oils

William Lee Hankey (1869–1952) RWS, RI, ROI, RE, NS was a British painter, printmaker, and illustrator. He specialised in landscapes, character studies and portraits of pastoral life, particularly in studies of mothers with young children such as "We’ve Been in the Meadows All Day".

He was born in Chester and worked as a designer after leaving school. He studied art in the evenings at the Chester School of Art (now the Department of Art and Design at University of Chester), then at the Royal College of Art. Later in Paris he became influenced by the work of Jules Bastien-Lepage, who also favoured rustic scenes depicted in a realistic but sentimental style. He first exhibited at the Royal Academy in 1896 and was President of the London Sketch Club from 1902 to 1904. He stayed in France in the early 1900s, painting many of his works in Brittany and Normandy, where he depicted a peasant lifestyle which was already disappearing in England. From 1904 until well after World War I he maintained a studio at the Etaples art colony.

In 1896, Hankey married fellow artist Mabel Emily Hobson (thereafter commonly known as Mabel Lee Hankey or Mabel Emily Hankey). Their marriage lasted 21 years. Hankey then married Edith Mary Garner.

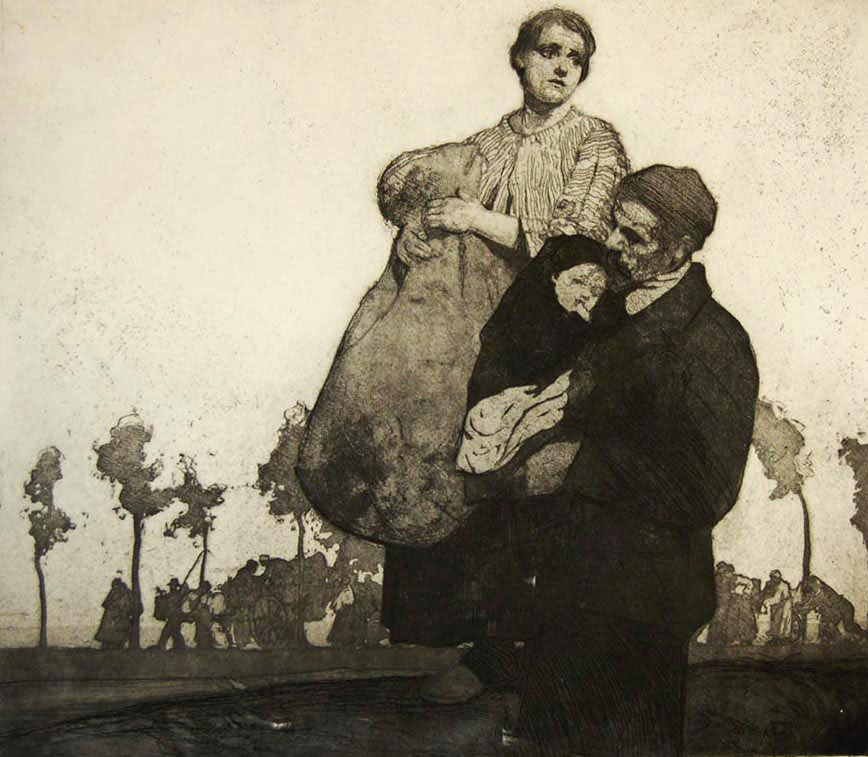
"The Refugees", based on Hankey's observations just behind the front line at Étaples

Writing in The Studio (Vol. XXXVI, No. 154, Jan. 1906) A. L. Baldry commented that "He is in his water-colours an absolute purist; he paints entirely with transparent pigments, and never has recourse to opaque colours; his brushwork is broad and confident – free, on the one hand, from affectation of showy cleverness, and, on the other, from niggling minuteness or over-elaboration; and he does not insist, as is the fashion with many present-day painters, upon lowness of tone." His French paintings include land- and seascapes such as "The Harbour at Étaples" and the distant view of the town in Auckland Art Gallery and figure studies like "Mother and Child" and "The Goose Girl".

But it was Hankey's black and white and coloured etchings of the people of Étaples, several developed from these paintings, which gained him a reputation as 'one of the most gifted of the figurative printmakers working in original drypoint during the first thirty years of the 20th century'. One that is particularly striking for its stylistic presentation was "The Refugees", his contribution to raising awareness of the consequences for ordinary people of the German invasion of France and Belgium in 1914. He went on to serve with the Artists' Rifles from 1915 to 1918.

In Britain he had been associated with the Newlyn School, a group of English artists based in the titular village in Cornwall who were themselves influenced by the romantic poets such as Wordsworth and Keats.
