= William Holt Yates Titcomb =

English artist

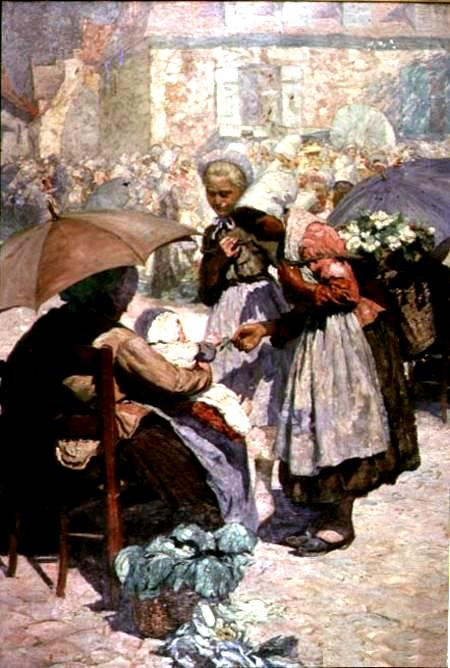
Market Day, Étaples

William Holt Yates Titcomb (22 February 1858 in Cambridge; 7 September 1930 in Bristol) was an English artist. He was a figurative oil painter, particularly known for his depictions of the Cornish fisherfolk.

Titcomb was born in Cambridge, the eighth child and first son of the Rev. Jonathan Holt Titcomb and his wife Sarah. He was educated at Westminster School in London and began his art training at the South Kensington School. His father was appointed the first Bishop of Rangoon, Burma in 1877 and Titcomb joined him there in December 1880. In Burma he made a series of paintings and sketches of life in the local monasteries.

Titcomb was taught in Paris by Gustave Boulanger and at the Royal College of Art in Antwerp by Charles Verlat. He married Jessie Ada Morison, in 1892. She was also an artist, living at the time in St. Ives, Cornwall.

His painting Primitive Methodists at Prayer, was displayed at the Dudley Museum and Art Gallery in 1889. It won many international medals and was the first of three paintings that Titcomb completed of the Primitive Methodist congregation of Fore street, St. Ives.

In 1909, Titcomb settled in Bristol, where he was already an elected Academician of the Bristol Academy of Fine Art, which later became the Royal West of England Academy (RWA). He encouraged a number of his Cornish contacts to become RWA Academicians.

Titcomb has two watercolour paintings in the V&A titled Quimperlé, Brittany and Old Houses at Oléron.
