= James Ashton (artist) =

Australian artist (1859-1935)

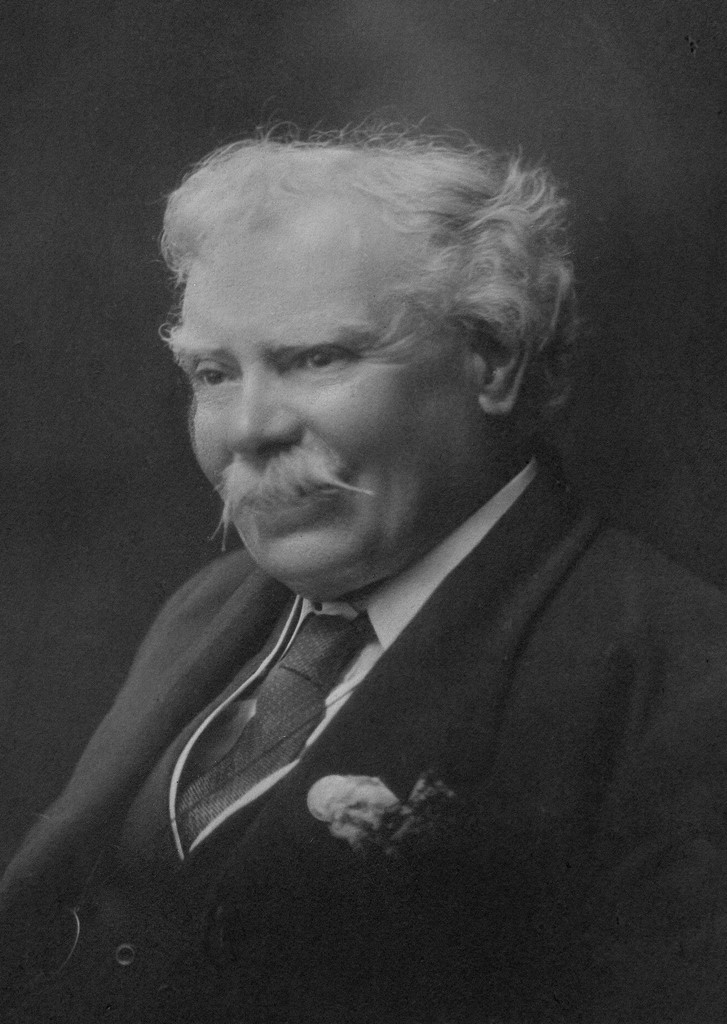
- James Ashton in 1880
- Born: James Ashton; 4 April 1859; Isle of Man, United Kingdom
- Died: 2 August 1935 (aged 76); Adelaide, South Australia
- Education: Royal College of Art
- Known for: Landscape and marine painting, art teacher
- Spouse: Mary Elizabeth Rawlings Turnbull (m. 1880)
- Children: John William "Will" Ashton
- Elected: FRSA, 1895

James Ashton (4 April 1859 – 2 August 1935) was an artist and arts educator in South Australia.

== Early life ==
Ashton was born on the Isle of Man, grew up in York and was educated at the Blue Coat School, London. After being apprenticed to a pharmacist, he studied art at the South Kensington School of Art, London and at Paris. He married Mary Elizabeth Rawlings Turnbull on 27 December 1880.

== Career ==
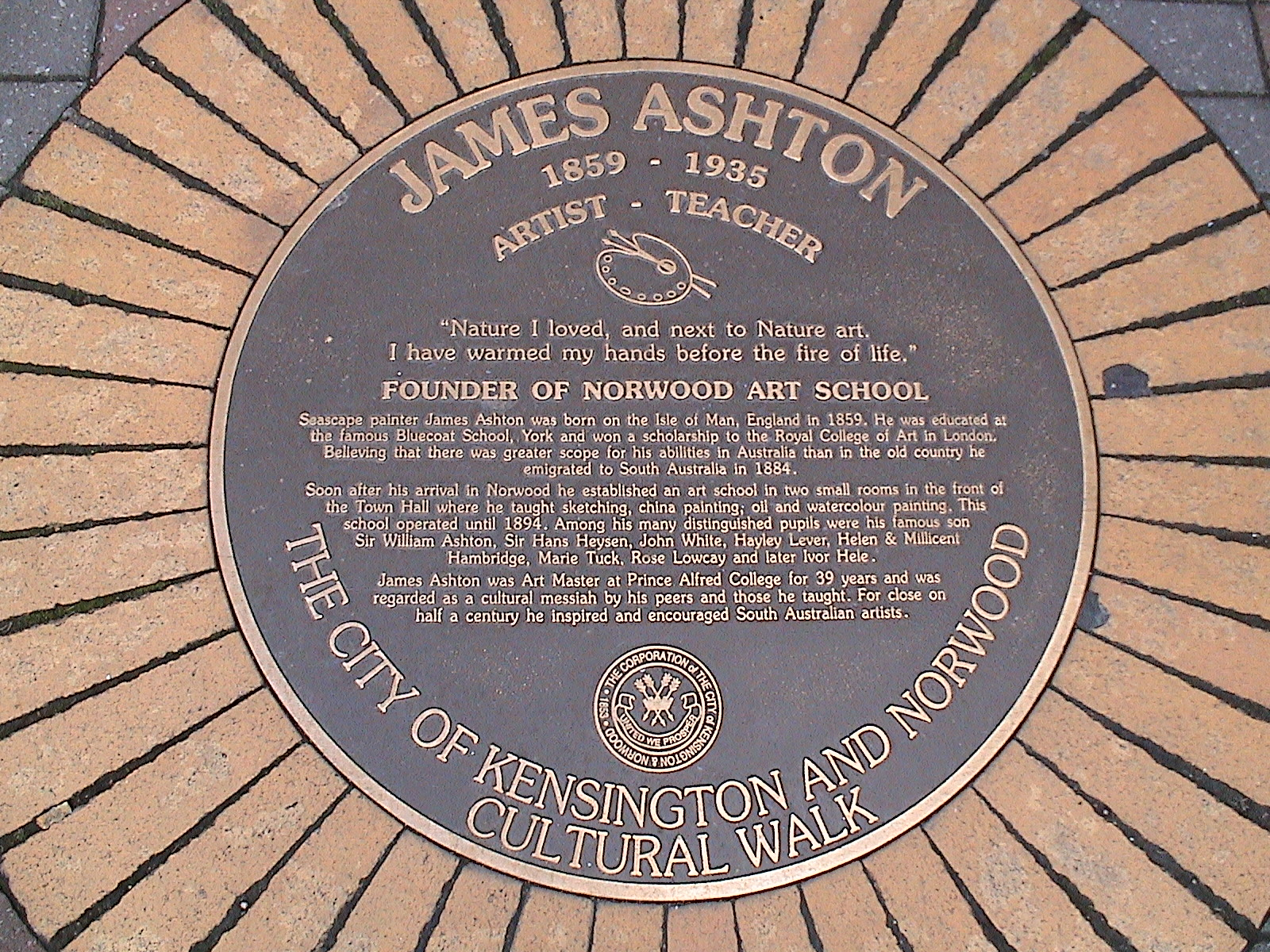
James Ashton commemorative plaque, outside the Town Hall on Norwood Parade. 34°55′15.7″S 138°38′10.6″E

Ashton emigrated to Adelaide, arriving 11 January 1884 deciding to become a professional artist. He established the Norwood art school in 1886.

He visited England in 1894, studied under Henry Moore, R.A. for three months, and was elected a member of the Royal Society of Arts.

Returning to Adelaide in 1895 he founded the Academy of Arts in Victoria Buildings, Victoria Square, and for over 30 years was the best known teacher of painting in South Australia. Among his pupils were Ivor Hele, Hans Heysen, Hayley Lever, Frank White, Arthur Baker-Clack, his son Will Ashton, and others who have since done distinguished work. He was an art teacher at Prince Alfred College for nearly 40 years, and donated his art collection and library to the school.

He was president of the South Australian Society of Arts for four years and a founding member and longtime president of the Adelaide Easel Club.

== Personal life ==
He died at Adelaide on 2 August 1935 of intestinal obstruction due to hernia. He was survived by his wife and a son and a daughter.

His son, Sir John William Ashton, became a well-known artist and was appointed director of the Art Gallery of New South Wales, Sydney in 1936.

== Works ==
Ashton is represented by five pictures in the Art Gallery of South Australia, of which The Moon Enchanted Sea is the best known. Paintings by him are also in the Broken Hill, Bendigo, and other galleries.

Works held by the Art Gallery of South Australia are:

- Where reeds and rushes grow c.1899
- Sunset on the gulf 1900
- The moon enchanted sea 1910
- Sand dunes c.1916
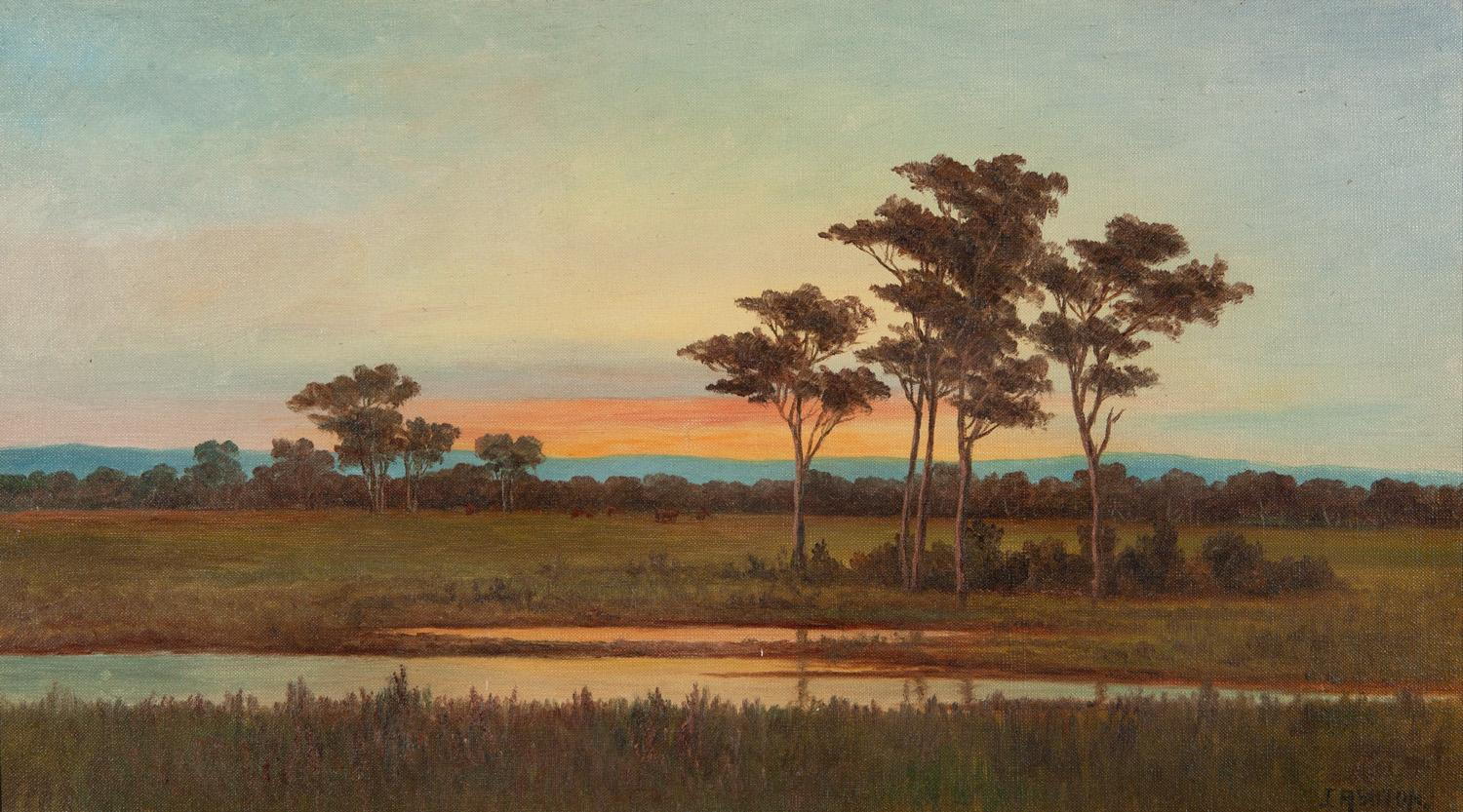
Sunrise at Canning Vale Farm, oil on canvas card.

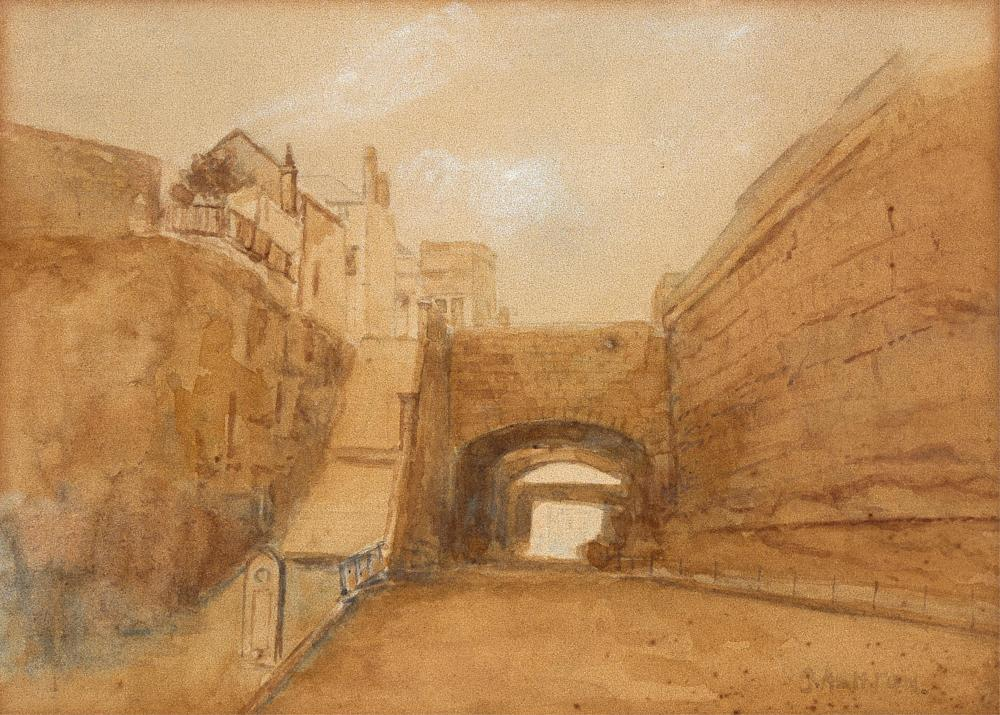
Argyle Cut, watercolor.

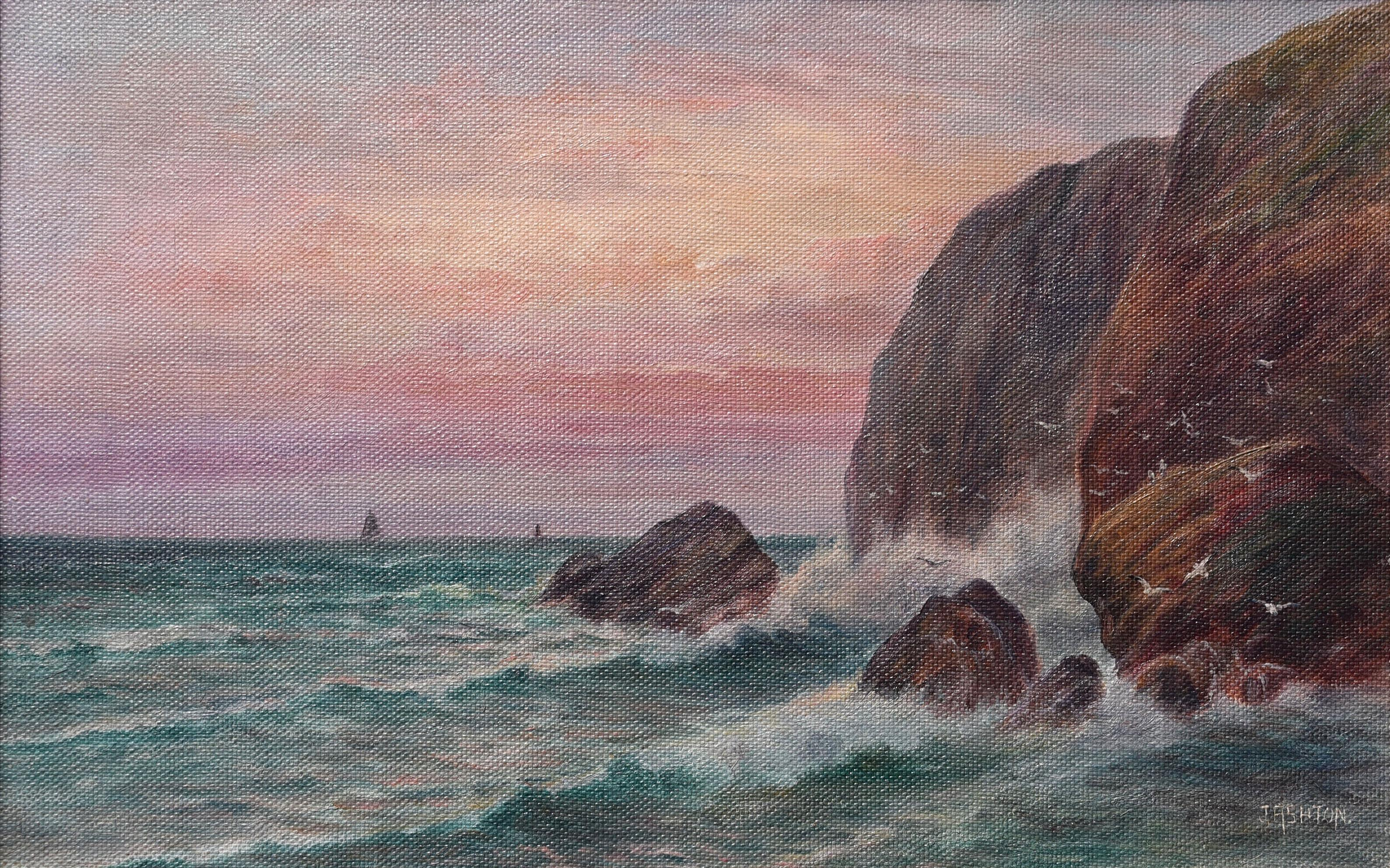
Untitled Rocky Coastal Scene with Red Sky and Gulls, oil on canvas.

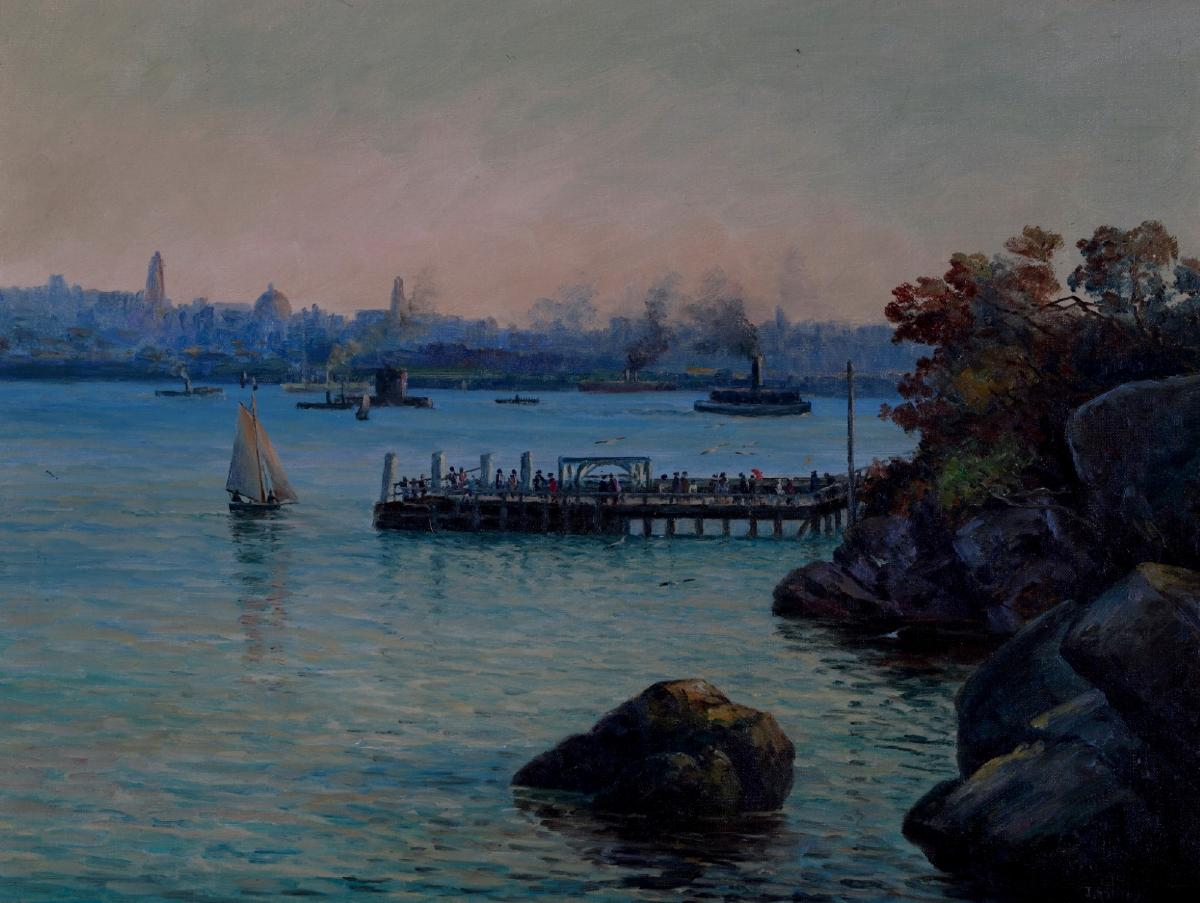
Wharf, oil on canvas
