= Beatrice Hankey =

- Born: 17 December 1858; Barnet
- Died: 1933 (aged 74–75)

Beatrice Hankey known as Help (17 December 1858 – 1933) was a British evangelist who was the founder of the Christian group or sect known as the "Blue Pilgrims".

== Life ==
Hankey was born in Barnet and Lodge in London. She came from middle class parents and she was the ninth of ten children. Her mother was Caroline Donovan and her father George Hankey was a merchant banker from Chester.

She was drawn to a religious life and she dedicated her time in assisting men and it was not an obvious move when she decided in 1902 that God wanted her to work not with poor and exploited women but with women from well off families. At the time there were few opportunities for these women. She gathered a small group around herself and called her followers knights based on an ancient translation of the word knecht meaning disciple.

Today the group is still small and it has been given the name "Blue Pilgrims" based on the items that members wear. The group now accepts both men and women and it allows members to retain their other religious associations. In 2019 it was led by Angela Youngman who was just completing ten years in the job. The group use several associations with the time of knights which new members tend to find strange, but acceptable.

Hankey died in 1933, but The Beatrice Hankey Foundation Limited is still (2019) a registered charity with a turnover of c. £50K which is spent by the trustees to "send forth Christian leaders, teachers and missionaries in deprived areas".
