= Mabel Lee Hankey =

British painter (1867–1943)

- Self-portrait c. 1930
- Born: Mabel Emily Hobson; 14 October 1867; Bath, Somerset, England
- Died: 5 January 1943 (aged 75); Storrington, Sussex, England
- Known for: Miniature portraits
- Spouse: William Lee Hankey

Mabel Lee Hankey (née Mabel Emily Hobson; 14 October 1867 – 5 January 1943) was a British artist specialising in miniature portraits painted in watercolour.

== Family and early life ==
Mabel Lee Hankey was born Mabel Emily Hobson, the fourth child of the artists Henry Edrington Hobson (1819-1881) and Ada Vinson Hardy (1829-1911). She was one of the third generation of artists in the family; both her grandfathers, Henry Hobson and James Hardy, were also artists. Mabel's siblings were also employed as artists: Henry Hope Hobson as a draftsman, Amy Elizabeth Hobson as a portrait painter, and Cecil James Hobson also as a painter of miniature portraits in watercolour.

== Marriage ==
In 1896 Hobson married William Lee Hankey (1869–1952), an artist who worked on book illustrations, character studies, landscapes, and pastoral scenes. After changing her name to Mabel Lee Hankey, she was listed variously under Lee Hankey, Lee-Hankey, or Hankey in catalogues. The marriage ended in divorce after 21 years, and thereafter Hankey used the name Mabel Emily Hankey.

== Career ==
Mabel Lee Hankey exhibited at the Royal Academy, the Royal Miniature Society, the Royal Society of British Artists and the Society of Women Artists from 1889 to 1897 under her maiden name (Mabel Emily Hobson), and again from 1898-1914 under the name Mabel Lee Hankey. She exhibited over 70 miniature portraits, mainly of women or children, at the Royal Academy.

She painted widely for aristocratic families, but is perhaps best known for her portraits of Lady Elizabeth Bowes-Lyon. In 1905, Lady Cecilia Bowes-Lyon, Countess of Strathmore and Kinghorne commissioned a watercolour miniature portrait of her daughter, Lady Elizabeth Bowes-Lyon, later Queen Elizabeth the Queen Mother, which Hankey exhibited at the Royal Academy and is now in the Royal Collection. Hankey went on to paint Lady Elizabeth Bowes-Lyon a number of times from childhood to adulthood and also her brother, David Bowes-Lyon, in 1916.

In a portrait of Lady Elizabeth painted in 1907, she wears a dress made by her mother, Lady Strathmore, based on a gown in a painting by Velázquez. Sir Roy Strong wrote about the portrait: "...there is never any doubt that the sitter has no element of hesitation or shyness in her relationship with portrait painters. The lustrous blue-grey eyes entrance the onlooker, the winsome tilt of the head already exudes that famous abundant charm, an attribute which is mentioned by every artist who has written any account of a sitting".

In 1923 Lady Strathmore commissioned a miniature portrait of Lady Elizabeth Bowes-Lyon wearing an evening dress; the painting was framed in gold and silver set with sapphires, with a jeweled crown at the top. On 23 February 1923 Lady Elizabeth wrote in her diary that a "horrible photographer" had been lying in wait for her when she went for a sitting to Mabel Hankey. The portrait was a wedding gift to Prince Albert, Duke of York on his marriage to Lady Elizabeth Bowes-Lyon in 1923. The painting was kept on the writing desk of Queen Elizabeth II in her private sitting room at Windsor Castle.

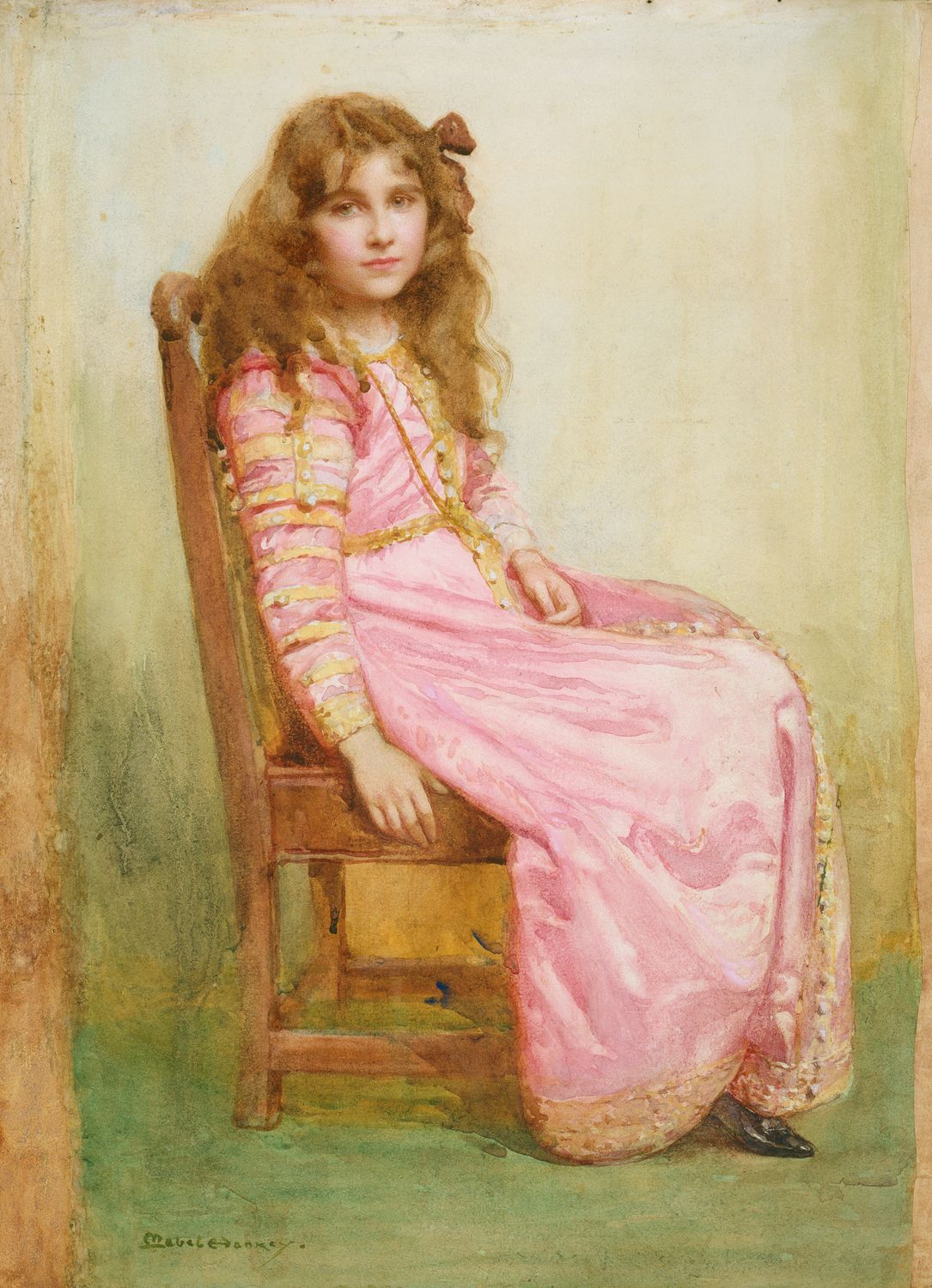
Lady Elizabeth Bowes-Lyon aged seven (1907)

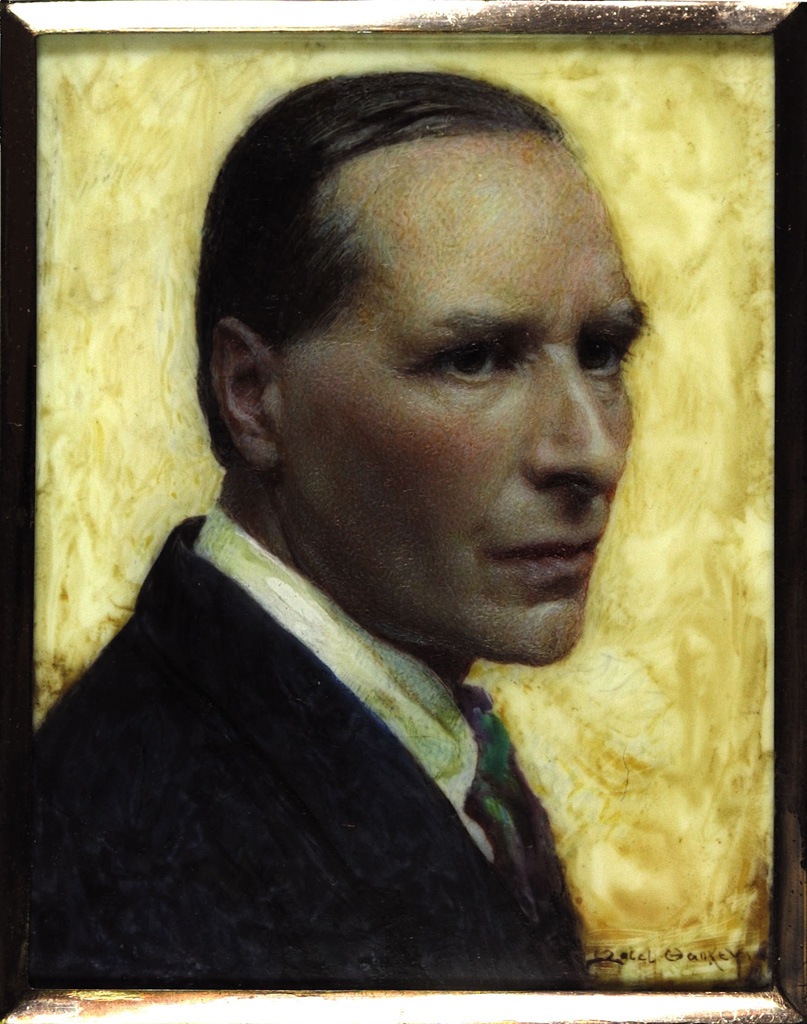
Edwin Fagg Esq. FRSL (1929)

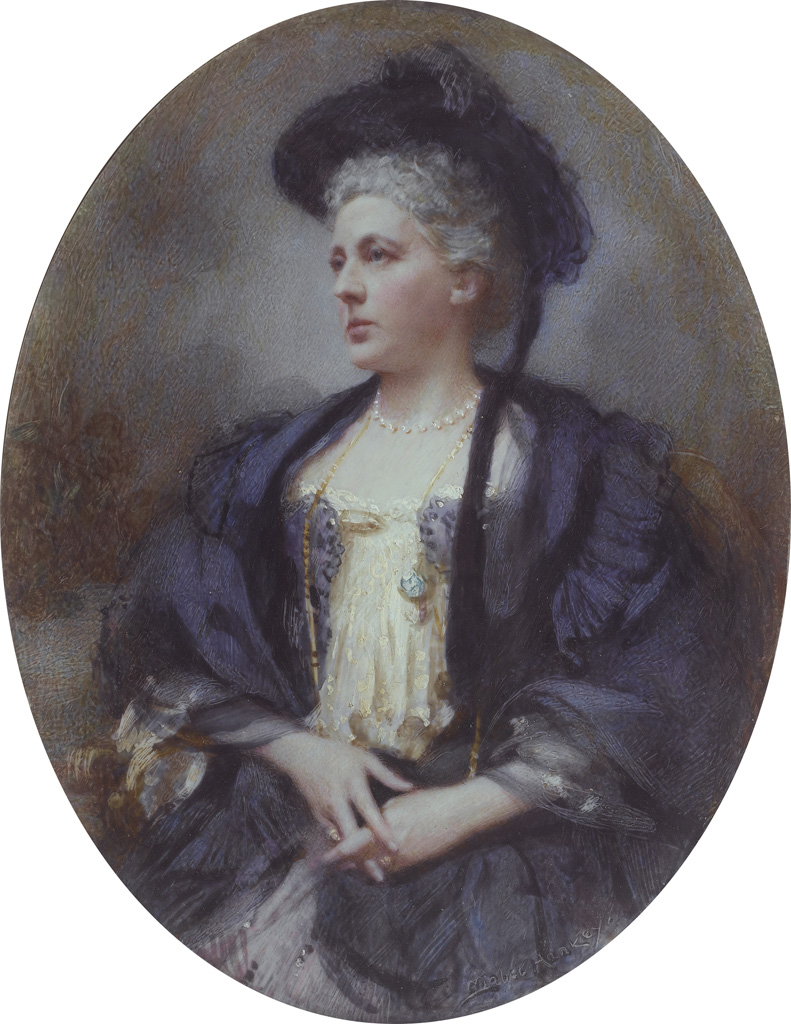
Lady Wimborne, née Cornelia Henrietta Maria Spencer-Churchill (1905)

Towards the end of 1939, Queen Elizabeth commissioned Mabel Lee Hankey to paint her portrait in watercolour, possibly as a means of providing some financial support; a memorandum written by the Queen stipulated that Mabel should be paid in advance for the portrait. At the beginning of the Second World War Mabel Lee Hankey moved from London to Storrington, Sussex (at "Fleurbaix in North Lane). In 1942 Queen Elizabeth commissioned portraits of the Princesses Elizabeth and Margaret, and another portrait of herself. The paintings were completed by Mabel Lee Hankey shortly before she died on 5 January 1943.

== Work in public collections ==
- Lady Elizabeth Bowes-Lyon, later the Queen Mother, painted 1907 (Royal Collection)
- Princess Mary, later Princess Royal & Countess of Harewood, painted 1910-14 (Royal Collection)
- Cecilia Bowes-Lyon, Countess of Strathmore and Kinghorne, painted 1923 (Royal Collection)
- Lady Elizabeth Bowes-Lyon, painted c. 1923 (Royal Collection)
- Queen Elizabeth, later the Queen Mother, painted 1940 (Royal Collection)
- Princess Elizabeth, later Queen Elizabeth II, painted 1942 (Royal Collection)
- Princess Margaret, later Countess of Snowdon, painted 1942 (Royal Collection)
- Rachel Kay-Shuttleworth, painted 1905 (Gawthorpe Textile Collection)
- Lady Cornelia Henrietta Maria Spencer-Churchill, painted 1905 (Poole Museum)
- Alice Frances Theodora Wythes, Marchioness of Bristol (1875-1957), painted 1903 (National Trust, Ickworth House)
- Lady Violet Ida Evelyn Lane-Fox, 16th Baroness Darcy of Nayth, Countess of Powis (1865-1929), painted 1885-1890 (National Trust, Powis Castle)
- Edwin Fagg Esq (Royal Society of Miniature Painters, Sculptors and Gravers archive collection)
- Summer Days (Christchurch Art Gallery)
