= Étaples =

Étaples-sur-Mer Étape-su-Mér
- Commune
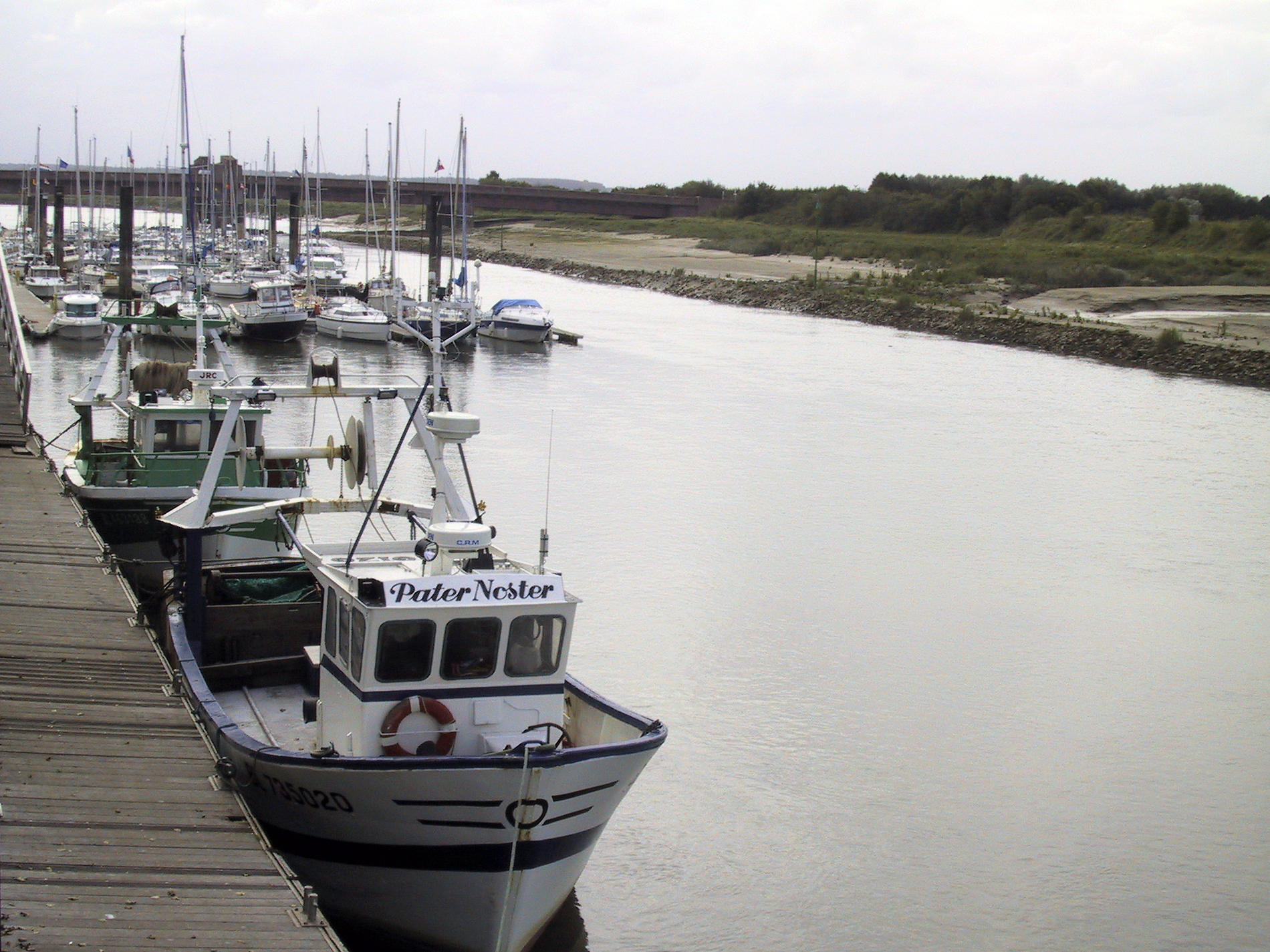
- Moorings at the mouth of the Canche River in Étaples

- Coat of arms
- Location of Étaples-sur-Mer
- Location within France Location within Hauts-de-France
- Coordinates: 50°31′07″N 1°38′29″E
- Country: France
- Region: Hauts-de-France
- Department: Pas-de-Calais
- Arrondissement: Montreuil
- Canton: Étaples
- Intercommunality: CA Deux Baies en Montreuillois

Government
  - Mayor (2022–2026): Franck Tindiller
- Area^{1}: 12.95 km^{2} (5.00 sq mi)
- Elevation: 10 m (33 ft)
- Highest elevation: 78 m (256 ft)
- Lowest elevation: 2 m (6.6 ft)
- Population (2023): 10,710
  - Density: 827.0/km^{2} (2,142/sq mi)
- Demonym(s): Étaplois, Étaploise (French); Étapoé, Étapoèse (Picard)
- Time zone: UTC+01:00 (CET)
  - Summer (DST): UTC+02:00 (CEST)
- INSEE/Postal code: 62318 /62630
- ^{1} French Land Register data, which excludes lakes, ponds, glaciers > 1 km^{2} (0.386 sq mi or 247 acres) and river estuaries.

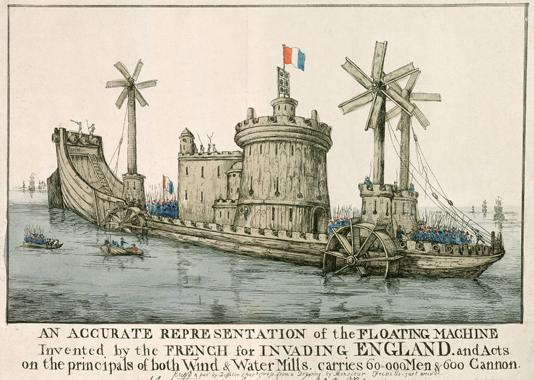
A satirical caricature of Napoleon's preparations for invasion by Robert Dighton, (1805)

Étaples or Étaples-sur-Mer (French pronunciation: [etapl syʁ mɛʁ]; Picard: Étape or Étape-su-Mér; formerly Dutch: Stapele; West Flemish: Stoapel) is a commune in the department of Pas-de-Calais, Hauts-de-France, northern France. It is a fishing and leisure port on the Canche river.

== History ==
Étaples takes its name from having been a medieval staple port (stapal in Old Dutch), from which word the Old French word Estaples derives. As a port it was part of the administrative and economic complex centred on Montreuil after access from the sea to that town was restricted by silting.

The site of modern Étaples lies on the ridge of dunes which once lay to seaward of a marsh formed off-shore from the chalk plateau of Artois. From the Canche northwards, the dunes tend to extend inland, all the way to the old chalk cliff. It lay just outside the southern edge of the mediaeval Boulonnais and some eighteen kilometres (11 miles) south of the geological region of that name.

The dunes were established as the sea level rose during the Quaternary and show signs of habitation during the Palaeolithic. They had therefore stabilized at something like their present form by 2000 BC. The dunes to the north-west of the town have revealed Iron Age, Gaulish material.

=== The Early-Medieval settlement ===
Étaples was one of a number of sites formerly identified as Quentovicus from which, as from Boulogne-sur-Mer, Roman ships prepared for the passage to Britannia. However, excavations coordinated by Dr David Hill of Manchester University between 1984 and 1991 uncovered the remains of a substantial settlement at Visemarest near the hamlet of La Calotterie. This site is located to the east of Étaples, further up the Canche valley, near the town of Montreuil-sur-Mer. This is now accepted as the site of Quentovic, although the finds from the excavations were located in the Musée de Quentovic in Étaples (at present indefinitely closed).

=== The Middle Ages ===
During the ninth century the coast was subject to raids and settlement by Norsemen. From their point of view, this off-shore site, protected by mud flats and marsh, was ideal as a base from which to conduct raids elsewhere, assemble the booty and ship it home.

In 1172, Matthew of Alsace, Count of Boulogne, built a fortress on the old Roman site. In 1193, King Philip Augustus made it the main port of his northern fleet after the southern end of the County of Boulogne (The Boulonnais) was added to the royal domain, forming the only direct access to this coast from royal lands in the hinterland.

Étaples was to suffer particularly during the Hundred Years War, owing to its proximity to the English landing places a little further north. Edward III of England burnt the port in 1346 as he was returning from the Battle of Crécy. In 1351 it was sacked by Roger Mortimer, 2nd Earl of March and burned in 1359 by Edward's son, John of Gaunt. There were sieges in 1378 and 1435 and it was burnt again in 1455 and 1546. To complete its disasters, the town had a severe outbreak of the plague in 1596.

=== The Renaissance onwards ===
On 3 November 1492, the castle was the scene of the signing of the Treaty of Étaples between Charles VIII of France and Henry VII of England. Henry had invaded France in 1492 to claim the French throne. However, he withdrew following the signing of the Treaty of Étaples, under which Charles agreed both to pay him a large subsidy and to cease supporting the Yorkist pretender Perkin Warbeck.

At the time of the Field of the Cloth of Gold, the diplomatic meeting near Calais between Francis I of France and Henry VIII of England, Francis stayed in the castle of Étaples. The meeting took place at Balinghem from 7 to 24 June 1520 and Francis slept at the castle on the 27th. Louis XIV was received there on 26 May 1637 and it was dismantled around 1641.

=== The Napoleonic period ===
Between 1803 and 1805, Napoleon gathered a large army in places along this coast, principally at Boulogne, so as to threaten an invasion of England. As part of this, for two years the Sixth Army Corps of Marshal Ney was stationed in and near to Étaples. Napoleon came several times to the town to review his troops. After the Battle of Trafalgar ended any hope of providing naval cover for an invasion, the troops moved on.

=== The nineteenth century and the influence of the railway ===
By the mid-nineteenth century, the Bradshaw railway guide was describing Étaples as 'a decayed fishing port, on a sandy plain'. The railway between Amiens and Boulogne had recently been built northwards along the coast and the Étaples-Le Touquet station was opened in 1848. Traffic was increased when the local railway company was amalgamated with the Chemins de fer du Nord in 1851 and the connection between Boulogne and Calais was completed in 1867, slowly reversing the decay. The line enabled the swift transport of fish inland as far as Paris, displacing the old chasse-marée system and requiring changes to working practices in order to accommodate the rail timetables. The town's economy also benefited from the influx of holiday visitors as what is now called the Côte d'Opale was developed. However, Étaples remained a working port with its fishing and associated trades such as boat building and rope making. The main holiday resort was developed 6 km (4 mi) away, south of the river, at what was then called Paris-Plage. The two banks of the Canche were linked by a road bridge in 1860 and the Étaples tramway was built from the town station to the resort in 1900. The big money flowed there and cheaper prices in the town attracted an international colony of artists between 1880 and 1914.

=== World War I ===
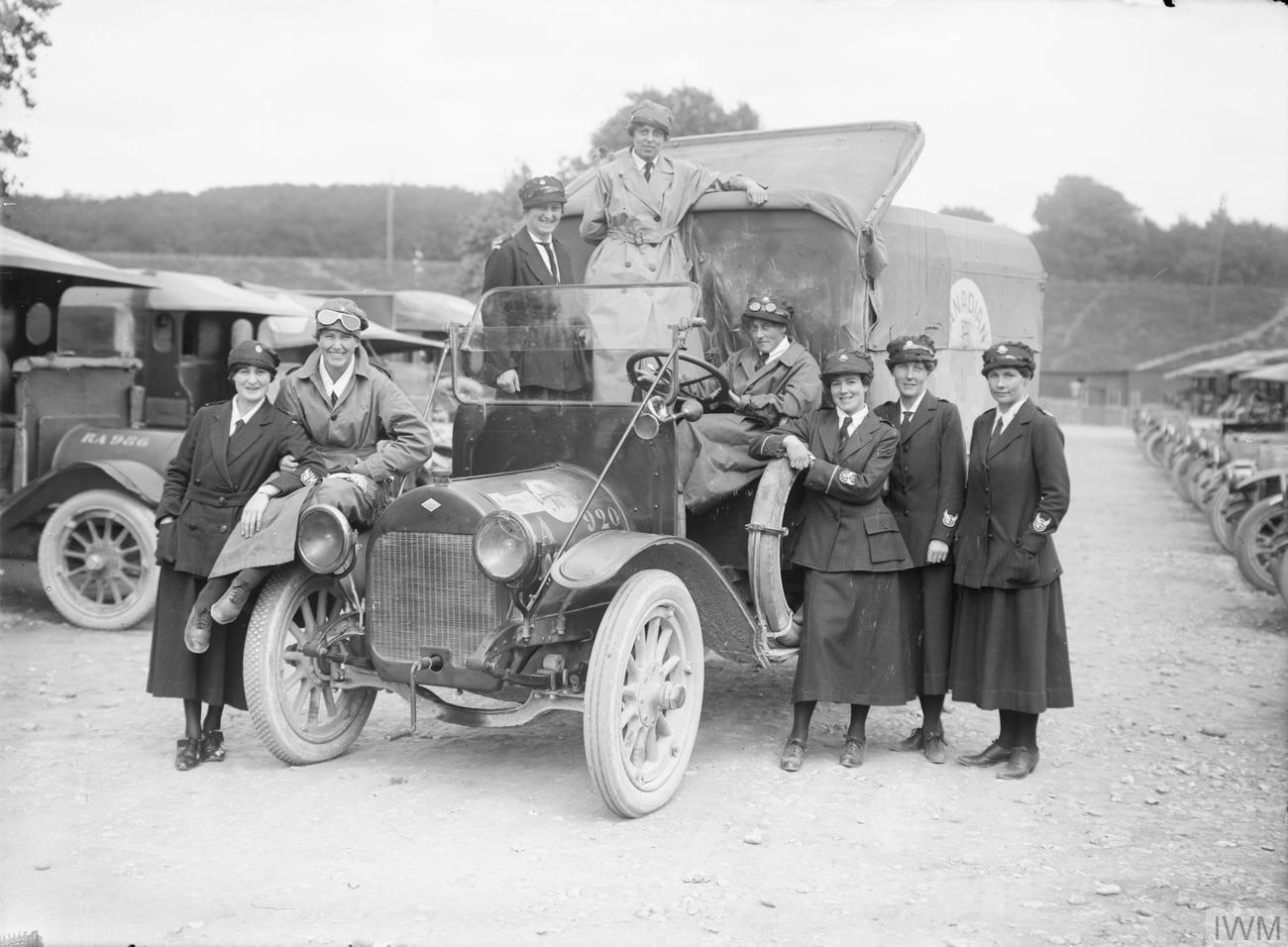
A group of ambulance drivers from the Voluntary Aid Detachment with their vehicle, a Canadian Red Cross ambulance, at Étaples (1917)

The railway, with its network of connections across the north of France, became of strategic importance during World War I, and it was added to temporarily during the period it lasted. Étaples became the principal depôt and transit camp for the British Expeditionary Force in France and also the point to which the wounded were transported.

Among the atrocities of the war, the hospitals there were bombed and machine-gunned from the air several times during May 1918. In one hospital alone, it was reported, 'One ward received a direct hit and was blown to pieces, six wards were reduced to ruins and three others were severely damaged. Sister Baines, four orderlies and eleven patients were killed outright, whilst two doctors, five sisters and many orderlies and patients were wounded.'

The military camp had a reputation for harshness and the treatment received by the men there led to the Étaples Mutiny in 1917. Étaples was also, from a later British scientific viewpoint, at the centre of the 1918 flu pandemic. The British virologist, John Oxford, and other researchers, have suggested that the Étaples troop staging camp was at the centre of the 1918 flu pandemic or at least home to a significant precursor virus to it. There was a mysterious respiratory infection at the military base during the winter of 1915–16.

Private A S Bullock recorded in his World War I memoir entering Étaples with his battalion just after the armistice. The camp, he noted, was 'almost infinitely expandable at very short notice', attributable to its organisation in groups of huts, each of which contained a headquarters, a cookhouse, and a store housing numerous additional tents and equipment. Bullock also describes the military hospital, whose thirty or so inmates were all 'murderers...at psychological war with one another'.

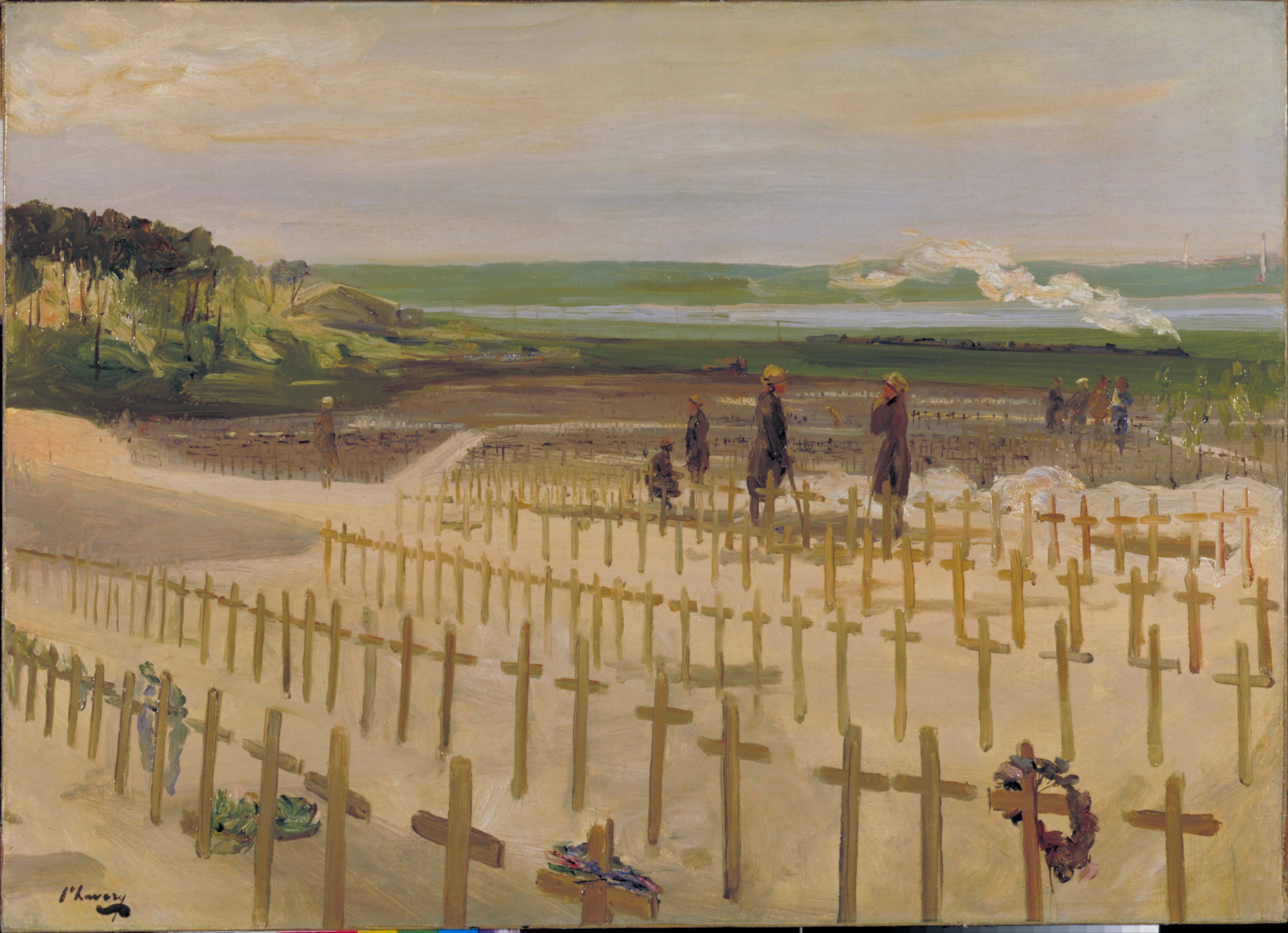
Sir John Lavery's oil painting The Cemetery, Etaples, 1919

The nearby six-hectare Étaples Military Cemetery is resting place to 11,658 British and Allied soldiers from the conflict. When the war artist John Lavery depicted it in 1919, he showed a train in the background, running along the bank of the river below the sandy crest on which the cemetery was sited.

Following the war, the town was given recognition by the French state for the difficulty of accommodating up to 80,000 men at a time over four years (according to Bullock 'when full it could accommodate half a million men') and the damage done by the enemy bombing which their presence attracted, and it was awarded the Croix de guerre in 1920.

=== World War II ===
In World War II, Étaples suffered again from German bombing and the tramway was irreparably damaged. The town was then occupied by the Germans and during the Allied invasion was again bombarded, causing seventy civilian casualties and destroying or damaging a third of its houses. In 1949, the Minister of Defence came and added a palme (bar) to the Croix de guerre.

== Demography ==
In 1807 the population was recorded as 1,507 and had grown to 4,692 by 1901. This had nearly doubled to 9,095 by 1968 and had grown to 11,714 in 2007.

Historical population
Year	Pop.	±% p.a.
1968	9,095	—
1975	10,559	+2.16%
1982	11,292	+0.96%
1990	11,305	+0.01%
1999	11,177	−0.13%
2007	11,714	+0.59%
2012	11,213	−0.87%
2017	10,865	−0.63%
2023	10,710	−0.24%
Source: INSEE

== Places of interest ==
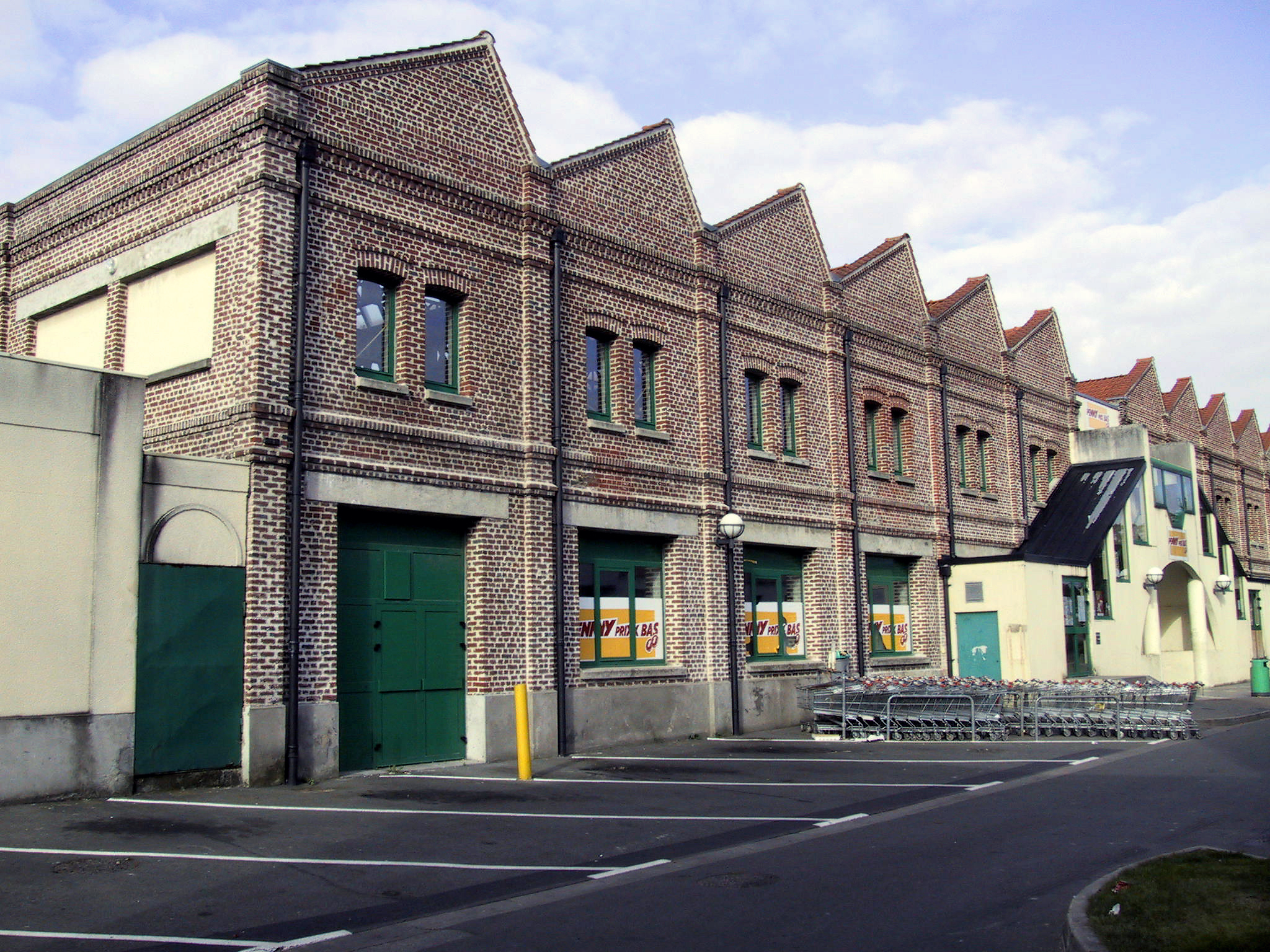
The old rope walk (rope-making works)

- The Rope Walk houses the tourist information office, the Museum of the Miniature (models etc.), the Maréis (all aspects of sea fishing).
- Étaples Museum of Seafaring: mainly the history of étapleois fishing. In the former fish market.
- The Canche Bay nature reserve: 505 hectares, mainly of natural dunes.
- Hôtel Souquet-Marteau noted for its façade and roof on the main square. It was occupied in 1803-5 by Marshal Ney. Napoleon paid two visits.
- The Delaporte Brewery was built in 1754 but largely destroyed by shelling in 1918. It was reconstructed in 1924 and is now out of use.
- Étaples Military Cemetery

== International relations ==
Étaples is twinned with:

- Hückeswagen, Germany since 29 July 1972
- Folkestone, United Kingdom since August 2009

== See also ==
Étaples art colony

== Bibliography ==
- anon Carte Géologique de la France à l'échelle du millionième 6th edn. BRGM (2003)
- Hill, D. et al. (1990). 'Quentovic defined', Antiquity, 64, no. 242.
- Baudelicque, P. L'Histoire de la Cité des Pêcheurs. Étaples Tourism web site.
- Bellew, G. Britain’s Kings and Queens 63 Reigns in 1100 Years. Pitkin Pictorials 1966.
- Volkmann, J-C. Bien Connaître les Généalogies des Rois de France. Éditions Jean-Paul Gisserot. (1997)
