= Paraskos =

Paraskos is a surname. Notable people with the surname include:

- Margaret Paraskos (born 1959), Cypriot artist, daughter of Stass
- Michael Paraskos (born 1969), British novelist and art critic
- Stass Paraskos (1933–2014), Cypriot artist
