= Mali Morris =

British artist (born 1945)

Mali Morris RA
- Born: 5 February 1945 (age 81); Caernarfon, Wales
- Education: University of Newcastle upon Tyne (BA Fine Art) (1963–68); University of Reading (MFA) (1968–70)
- Known for: Painting
- Elected: RA (16 March 2010)
- Website: malimorris.co.uk

Mali Morris RA (born 5 February 1945) is a British artist. She was born in north Wales, and studied at Newcastle University and the University of Reading.

In 1970 she became a lecturer in extramural studies at Sunderland College of Art, and in 1980 Morris was invited by the artist Stass Paraskos to be an artist-in-residence at the Cyprus College of Art in the village of Lempa on the island of Cyprus. Morris was elected as a Royal Academician in 2010.
