= Benedict Read =

English art historian

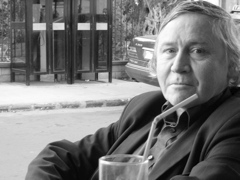
Benedict Read in Cyprus (photo: Michael Paraskos)

Benedict William Read FSA (26 March 1945 – 20 October 2016) was an English art historian. Usually known as Ben Read, he was the author of numerous books, essays and articles on nineteenth and twentieth century art history, and was one of the most authoritative writers in the second half of the twentieth century on British Victorian sculpture.

== Early life ==
Read was born in Seer Green, Beaconsfield, Buckinghamshire, but grew up in the village of Stonegrave, North Yorkshire. He was the son of art critic and poet Sir Herbert Read and the viola player Margaret Ludwig, the younger brother of the writer Piers Paul Read and younger half-brother of BBC documentary maker John Read. Through his parents he grew up surrounded by people from the art world like Barbara Hepworth, Henry Moore and Peggy Guggenheim and in later life enjoyed recounting anecdotes of life in the Read household.

He went to Ampleforth College, a Roman Catholic boarding school run by Benedictine monks.

== Academic career ==
Read studied classics and English literature at The Queen's College, Oxford and then art history at the Courtauld Institute of Art in London. As well as teaching at the Courtauld Institute, Read was Deputy Witt Librarian there until 1990. Whilst at the Courtauld, Read contributed photographs to the Conway Library that are currently being digitised by the Courtauld Institute of Art as part of the wider Courtauld Connects project.

In 1990 Read was appointed senior lecturer in art history at the University of Leeds, where he was also director of the MA Sculpture Studies programme from 1990 to 1997, under the auspices of the Henry Moore Foundation. He also taught on the History of Carving course at City & Guilds of London Art School where his lectures on monumental 19th- and 20th-century sculpture coupled with his depth of knowledge were widely appreciated by both staff and students.

In 1991 the first ever exhibition of Pre-Raphaelite Sculpture at Birmingham Museum and Art Gallery, which Read co-curated with Joanna Barnes, was considered groundbreaking and favourably received.

Read was the first chairman of the Public Monuments and Sculpture Association having been involved from its embryonic beginnings at the Sculpture in the North conference in 1991 and was instrumental in having the word "sculpture" included in the association’s title. He was also closely involved with setting up the prestigious academic Sculpture Journal and was chair of its editorial board, from its inception in 1997 until his death.

This relationship led to Read becoming a consultant and advising on restoration programmes at the Palace of Westminster, the Albert Memorial and Salisbury Cathedral. He also contributed essays to the books The Albert Memorial and The Houses of Parliament.

On his retirement from Leeds University in 2010, he was made senior visiting research fellow in fine art.

== Honours ==
Benedict Read was a Fellow of the Society of Antiquaries of London.

In addition to his festschrift, Sculpting Art History : Essays in Memory of Benedict Read, he was honoured, following his death, by The Henry Moore Institute with the publication of Benedict Read’s life in sculpture: His father never told him about things like this which included a reprint of the Introduction to Sculpture in Britain Between the Wars by Benedict Read and Peyton Skipwith; considered an extremely important volume.

== Wider interests ==
Benedict Read was external examiner for the Cyprus College of Art, Chairman of the Leeds Art Collections Fund for 9 years until his retirement in 2012, and a keen Arsenal supporter.

A committed Roman Catholic, Read was particularly interested in 20th-century Christian art and sat on the Roman Catholic Church's Historic Churches Committee for the Diocese of Leeds.

== Selected publications ==
- Henry Moore and the Arts Council Collection, exhibition catalogue with foreword by Caroline Douglas, London : Hayward Publishing, 2012, ISBN 9781853323027
- British Sculpture in India : new views and old memories Mary Ann Steggles and Richard Barnes (introduction by Tapati Guha-Thakurta & preface by Benedict Read), Norwich : Frontier, 2011, ISBN 9781872914411
- Edwardian Sculpture in ‘The Edwardians : secrets and desire’, ed. Anne Gray, exhibition catalogue, Canberra : National Gallery of Australia; Seattle, WA : Distributed in the U.S.A. by University of Washington Press, 2004, ISBN 0642541493
- Herbert Read : A British Vision of World Art, edited by Benedict Read and David Thistlewood, exhibition catalogue, Leeds : Leeds City Art Galleries in association with the Henry Moore Foundation and Lund Humphries, London, 1993, ISBN 0901981583
- The Alliance of Sculpture and Architecture : Hamo Thornycroft, John Belcher and the Institute of Chartered Accountants Building (with Terry Friedman, Derek Lindstrum, Daru Rooke, Helen Upton), Leeds : Henry Moore Centre for the Study of Sculpture, 1993, ISBN 0901981559
- Pre-Raphaelite Sculpture: nature and imagination in British sculpture 1848-1914, exhibition catalogue edited by Benedict Read & Joanna Barnes, London : The Henry Moore Foundation in association with Lund Humphries, 1991, ISBN 0853316090
- Sculpture in Britain between the Wars, exhibition catalogue, (with Peyton Skipwith), London : Fine Art Society,1986.
- Victorian Sculpture, New Haven & London : Yale University Press, 1982, ISBN 9780300031775
