= The New Aesthetics =

Art movement centered around physical processes

The New Aesthetics is a 21st-century contemporary art movement that focuses on the material and physical processes involved in the creation of visual art.

== Origins ==
The New Aesthetics movement originated in 2007 at an art summer school held in Irsee, southern Germany, where English artist Clive Head and Anglo-Cypriot writer and art theorist Michael Paraskos conducted a joint class. Head and Paraskos had previously taught together at the University of Hull before temporarily leaving academic teaching in 2000. The reunion in Irsee led to the publication of a small pamphlet called "The Aphorisms of Irsee." This pamphlet presented a series of seventy-five aphoristic sayings on the nature of art.

While some of the sayings in the pamphlet were intentionally humorous, such as "Beware the Swiss bearing sausages," the majority of them conveyed what the authors considered to be the essential elements of artistic practice. Some sayings were deliberately provocative, such as aphorism 38: "Performance is not art: it moves too much and so adds to the flux. Art is always a longed for stasis." This saying can be juxtaposed with aphorism 37: "True art fixes the flux of chaos. That is how we cope with chaos, and that is the purpose of art."

Other aphorisms seem to reference the classes' content. Aphorism 47 stated: "One should choose whether to make tables or bake cakes, and not be a carpenter of cakes or a baker of tables." This aphorism seems to refer to a fable-like story published by Paraskos in 2008, where a carpenter believes he is a baker because he can make tables. Paraskos introduces the story by stating that it was written in 2007, just before the summer school in Irsee, while he was teaching at another art summer school at the Cyprus College of Art. Paraskos's introduction also mentions that he "performed" it while in Irsee. "The Aphorisms of Irsee" is subtitled "Part One of the New Aesthetics," which appears to be the first use of the term.

== Michael Paraskos and the Table Top Schools of Art ==
Although some of the ideas associated with the New Aesthetics can be observed in the pre-existing works of Head and other artists, the movement itself gained traction after the publication of Michael Paraskos's booklet "The Table Top Schools of Art" in 2008.

Subtitled "Part Two of the New Aesthetics," the booklet presented an opposition to Conceptualism in art and advocated for the development of a "new aesthetics." Its key components, Paraskos argued, would be an artist's active engagement with the physical world, the artist's use of art materials to respond to that engagement, and the viewer in turn engaging with the physicality of the resulting work of art. Paraskos criticized what he viewed as centuries of misguided discourse on art, often by philosophers, literary critics, and others whose fields were more abstract than material, that downplayed or denigrated art's physicality. He argued that this philosophy should be replaced by a philosophy of art grounded in the practical experience of its creation. This standpoint inherently rejects Conceptualism, as conceptualists not only adhere to a non-material philosophical tradition but also prioritize immaterial ideas over the material object.

== Is Your Artwork Really Necessary? ==
The third publication about the New Aesthetics was Michael Paraskos's collection of journalistic writings on art titled "Is Your Artwork Really Necessary?" This compilation, subtitled "Part Three of the New Aesthetics," discusses contemporary and historical artworks as well as political issues, and reaffirms the significance of material engagement in art.

For example, in the article about Head, Paraskos argues that photography is problematic in artistic terms because of its immaterial nature and the distancing role of the camera as an intermediator between the artist and physical reality. A similar emphasis on materiality is evident in the articles on Hughie O'Donoghue and Van Dyck,, which also focus heavily on their paintings' physicality rather than their narrative or conceptual meanings. In the introduction, Paraskos takes his previous stance against immaterial art forms such as Conceptualism even further, calling for an "artistic revolution."

== Clive Head ==
Although not explicitly identified as part of the New Aesthetics movement, both Clive Head's paintings and writings embody its philosophy. Head's introduction to John Russell Taylor's book Exactitude calls for realist painters to move beyond their reliance on the camera and instead engage directly with the physical world around them. Head extends this viewpoint to include non-realist painters as well. Both Paraskos and Head argued that direct, physical, and in-the-moment engagement with the material world, a concept they called "actuality," was the only legitimate way for art to be relevant in contemporary times.

== Alan Pocaro ==
Alan Pocaro's formal involvement in the New Aesthetics movement began in 2010, first through correspondence with Paraskos and then an online joint teaching session in early 2011 for students at Miami University. Alongside his teaching position at the Art Academy of Cincinnati, Pocaro had written articles for the Cincinnati-based art magazine AEQAI, in which he developed a parallel philosophy of art similar to the one proposed by Paraskos and Head. This is evident in several of his writings for AEQAI, including his assertion that the discourse of art is not a free-for-all but rather, as Paraskos suggests in his book "Regeneration," an activity with specific parameters.

== Robert Neffson ==
Robert Neffson, an American painter, had an ongoing correspondence with Head about topics including the role of realism in contemporary art, the creative process, and many of the emerging concepts of the New Aesthetic. A selection of these exchanges was published in "Clive Head and Robert Neffson" (London: Marlborough Fine Art, 2007). Neffson has also discussed ideas about the New Aesthetic with Paraskos. Neffson's artwork shows evidence of some of these principles, such as his personal involvement with the spaces he depicts and his expressive perspective. His paintings extrapolate elements of reality to create specific emotional responses from viewers.

== See also ==
- Post-Internet
