= Terry Friedman =

American art historian

Terence Frederick Friedman (1940-2013) was an American-born art and architectural historian and museum curator. After his death in Leeds, UK, The Sculpture Journal, in their tribute, defined him as ‘a rare being - a scholar curator working in a regional museum, and an outstanding art historian, educator and collector’. He was also a highly acclaimed author and respected as a leading authority on 18th century ecclesiastical architecture. His book, The Eighteenth-Century Church in Britain, the first substantial study of the subject to appear in over half a century, won the William MB Berger Prize for British Art History in 2012.

== Early life and education ==
Terry Friedman was born in Detroit and raised in a liberal Jewish family. He attended the Temple Beth El synagogue where he was a confirmand in 1955. After graduating from the University of Michigan he moved to London in 1964 to undertake postgraduate studies at the Courtauld Institute of Art. His doctoral thesis on James Gibbs, an influential British architect perhaps best known for St Martin-in-the-Fields, formed the basis of Friedman's first major publication.

== Professional life ==
After completing his PhD in the late 1960s, Dr Friedman moved to Leeds to take up his first postdoctoral position as Keeper of Decorative Art Studies at Temple Newsam House. It was a new and unique role set up specifically to run the BA degree course in the history of decorative arts and museum studies which had been the brainchild of Professor Quentin Bell of Leeds University and Robert Rowe, director of Leeds Art Galleries. The degree in itself was an innovative collaboration between university and municipal gallery and its location revived Temple Newsam as a place of learning. It was to be a role he fulfilled until 1993 when he retired early to devote his time to what was to be his final book that involved extensive research in churches, chapels, vestries, vicarages, archives and county record offices all over Britain. Despite serious illness and major brain surgery in 2004 the book was published in 2011.

In 1982 the Queen opened The Henry Moore Sculpture Gallery within the newly renovated Leeds Art Gallery complex and Terry Friedman became its Principal Keeper whilst still maintaining his teaching role. The move to Leeds City Art Gallery was primarily to establish the Henry Moore Centre for the Study of Sculpture within the gallery; an agreement having been reached between the Henry Moore Foundation and Leeds City Council to create a centre for the study and appreciation of fine arts, primarily sculpture. Friedman became its first head.

This period in his career was to be a productive decade of important exhibitions, astute acquisitions and the imparting of knowledge through lectures and scholarly well-designed and illustrative catalogues, the cost of which he endeavoured to keep as low as possible so students could afford them.

In 1993 the Henry Moore Centre for the Study of Sculpture was renamed the Henry Moore Institute, moved into new premises, and Penelope Curtis succeeded Terry Friedman as its head.

== Exhibitions ==
The first exhibition at the newly opened Sculpture Gallery in 1982, ‘Henry Moore: Early Carvings 1920–1940’, dedicated to the man whose name graced the doors, was well received and it was to be the first of many which celebrated sculpture in all its forms since ‘Terry’s broad definition of sculpture to include casts, garden and architectural sculpture, coins, medals and sketches was ahead of its time’.

From surrealism and pop art through to what is considered more conventional sculpture, Terry Friedman curated many well-received exhibitions at both Temple Newsam House and Leeds City Art Gallery. From relatively unknown sculptors such as Joseph Gott (1972 exhibition which went on to Liverpool's Walker Art Gallery) to artists and sculptors early in their careers, for example, George Meyrick (1984), Andy Goldsworthy (1985) and Peter Randall-Page (1992) who Friedman championed.

He had a particular rapport with the sculptor Andy Goldsworthy who had an association with Yorkshire having grown up in Leeds. The retrospective survey of Goldsworthy's early work in the 1990 exhibition ‘Hand to Earth’, which also toured, was accompanied by a catalogue in which Terry Friedman ‘assembled Goldsworthy’s lyrical photographs of his own works plus interviews and essays by ten contributors, among them an ecologist, an art historian, several curators and the novelist John Fowles. The combination of superlative illustrations and incisive texts makes it the most authoritative and comprehensive publication available on Andy Goldsworthy’s early work’ and it has been reprinted several times. At Goldsworthy's invitation, Terry also contributed to Wood (1996) and Time (2000).

Other notable exhibitions curated by Terry Friedman included two celebrating Jacob Epstein, considered, by the Sculpture Journal, to be an undervalued figure in twentieth-century sculpture at the time. The 1987 exhibition (with Evelyn Silber) ‘Jacob Epstein – Sculpture and Drawings’ travelled on to the Whitechapel Gallery, London when Nicholas Serota was its director. Both were perfectionists and Evelyn Silber told a story at the Colloquium of how she had to, metaphorically speaking, pull them apart when an argument erupted over a particular case of exhibits as time was running out to open the Gallery to the Press.

His last major exhibition at the gallery in 1993 was a tribute to the influential Yorkshire-born art critic Herbert Read, whose son, Benedict Read edited and contributed to the exhibition catalogue, Herbert Read : A British Vision of World Art.

== Leeds, his second home ==
In 1969 Terry Friedman moved to Leeds where he spent the rest of his life, becoming an honorary ‘Loiner’.

The Terry Friedman Colloquium, held in May 2015 at Leeds Art Gallery, brought together a large group of friends and colleagues ‘to celebrate the life and achievement of the man from Detroit who had seen the point of Leeds’. In his obituary, the Yorkshire Post alluded to the major contribution he made to the cultural life of his adopted city and in a report of Friedman's Colloquium for the Public Monuments and Sculpture Association, the art historian, James Hamilton concluded ‘Every city needs a Terry Friedman; but there was only one. Lucky Leeds. Lucky us’.

Friedman's love of collecting led to his flat in Chapel Allerton, which he humorously called ‘Palazzo Friedman’, being compared to an art gallery; the only difference being the lack of labelling. Friedman gifted much of his collection to institutions, often local. For example, a painting by Percy Hague Jowett is held in the collection of The Stanley and Audrey Burton Gallery, University of Leeds and he made other generous donations to Leeds Museums & Galleries Collection and that of the Middlesbrough Institute of Modern Art. The Paul Mellon Centre for Studies in British Art was another recipient of Friedman's largesse.

At the Colloquium, a book, Cornucopia : Essays on architecture, sculpture and decorative art in honour of Terry Friedman, was launched and, in 2016, a new acquisition for the Leeds Museums and Galleries Sculpture Collection was exhibited for the first time at the Henry Moore Institute. 'Charity and Justice',1888 by William Hamo Thorneycroft was purchased in 2015 ‘in memory of Dr Terry Friedman, former Principal Keeper of Leeds Art Gallery, with assistance from the Art Fund and Leeds Art Fund’. A fitting tribute by the city he loved and who loved him.

== Other ==
Photographs contributed by Terry Friedman to the Conway Library are currently being digitised by the Courtauld Institute of Art, as part of the Courtauld Connects project.

== Selected publications ==
- The Eighteenth-Century Church in Britain, New Haven & London : Yale University Press, 2011, ISBN 9780300159080
- Wood, Andy Goldsworthy with introduction by Terry Friedman, London : Thames & Hudson, 2010, ISBN 0500515174
- The Georgian Parish Church : 'Monuments to Posterity', Reading : Spire Books, 2004, ISBN 0954361539
- Time, Andy Goldsworthy with chronology by Terry Friedman, New York & London : Harry N. Abrams, 2000, ISBN 0810944820
- Church Architecture in Leeds 1700-1799, Leeds : Thoresby Society, 1997, ISBN 090074149X
- The Alliance of Sculpture and Architecture : Hamo Thornycroft, John Belcher and the Institute of Chartered Accountants Building ( with Benedict Read, Derek Lindstrum, Daru Rooke, Helen Upton), Leeds : Henry Moore Centre for the Study of Sculpture, 1993, ISBN 0901981559
- 'The Hyde Park Atrocity' : Epstein's Rima : creation and controversy, Leeds : Henry Moore Centre for the Study of Sculpture, 1988, ISBN 0901981370
- James Gibbs, New Haven & London : Yale University Press, 1984, ISBN 0901981370
- Joseph Gott, 1786-1860, sculptor, eds. Timothy Stevens and Terry Friedman, Leeds : Temple Newsam House, Stable Court Exhibition Galleries, 1972, ISBN 0901981028
