= Jennifer Durrant =

British artist

Jennifer Durrant RA (born 17 June 1942) is a British artist.

Jennifer Durrant was born in Brighton on 17 June 1942, and studied at the Brighton College of Art from 1959 to 1963, and at the Slade School of Art from 1963 to 1966.

In 1971 she began to work at the Stockwell Depot, a former brewery in Stockwell forming a co-operative studio and exhibition space, described as "a rough and tough environment". The influential critic Clement Greenberg visited the Depot in 1978 and praised her work.

As a visiting lecturer she was to teach at numerous art schools, including Canterbury College of Art. In 1979 she was invited by the artist Stass Paraskos to be an artist-in-residence at the Cyprus College of Art arts centre in Paphos on the island of Cyprus. In 1979–80 she was artist-in-residence at Somerville College, Oxford. She moved to Umbria, Italy, in 2000, and works in a studio overlooking Lake Trasimeno, and also has a home in her birth town of Brighton.

Her work is held in collections including Museum of Fine Arts, Boston, Neue Galerie, Aachen, Tate Gallery, London, The Government Art Collection, ICI Millbank, National Westminster Bank, New York, and Union Bank of Switzerland, London.

A 2008 article describes her art as "instantly recognisable: bands of colour, painted in acrylic and gouache, are overlaid with vivid dots of contrasting colour. Abstract and spontaneous in their intentional asymmetry, they borrow from nature but are in no sense literal." As of 2020 the Royal Academy shop offers notecards, aprons and teatowels featuring these characteristic designs.

== Recognition ==
Durrant was elected as a Royal Academician in 1994.

The National Portrait Gallery holds a photograph of Durrant, taken by Dennis Toff in her studio in Italy in 2007.
