= The Prague Project =

Artistic collaboration and exhibition

The Prague Project was an art project involving the photorealist painters Anthony Brunelli, Clive Head, Bertrand Meniel and Raphaella Spence, and the writer Michael Paraskos, held in Prague in 2003. It culminated in an exhibition at the Roberson Museum and Science Center, Binghamton, New York in 2004-2005, and an accompanying catalogue.

== History ==
The Prague Project was organised by the Bernarducci Meisel Gallery in New York, involving the artists Anthony Brunelli, Clive Head, Bertrand Meniel and Raphaella Spence. The project began with a commission given to Brunelli to paint Prague, but quickly grew into a more elaborate project involving the three other artists, all of whom were associated with the Bernarducci Meisel Gallery at that time.

From this start the aim of the project became to send a group of Photorealist painters from Europe and the United States to the Czech capital Prague and ask them each to produce two paintings based on their experience of the city. These were then to be exhibited in the United States.

The artists travelled together to Prague, and stayed in the same accommodation, in order to promote a dialogue between them, and explore differing methods of photorealist painting. In this the participation of Clive Head is of significance as he has denied frequently he is a photorealist painter. At the request of Clive Head, the art critic Michael Paraskos was included in the trip to Prague. However he was not subsequently selected to write the catalogue essay that accompanied the exhibition of the paintings produced, with that role being taken instead by Gregory Saraceno. The exclusion of Paraskos was possibly due to his known criticism of mainstream photorealist painting. Nonetheless the exhibition was described by one journalist as "showing the breadth and richness of photorealism."

Also accompanying the artists was a film crew from Binghamton University invited by Anthony Brunelli to record the Prague visit.

== Further projects ==
Following the project further group projects involving photorealist painters have been organised, including The Zurich Project in 2007, which brought in the first generation photorealist painter Tom Blackwell, and the Monaco Project, based around the Monaco Grand Prix, which involved the artists Roberto Bernardi, Tom Blackwell, Anthony Brunelli, Clive Head, Robert Gniewek, Ron Kleemann, Bertrand Meniel and Raphaella Spence. They were accompanied by the art critic Linda Chase.

In 2011 the New York Project was shown, involving fifteen artists: Anthony Brunelli, Tom Blackwell, Paul Caranicas, Richard Estes, Robert Gniewek, Gus Heinze, Don Jacot, Charles Jarboe, Ron Kleemann, Bertrand Meniel, Robert Neffson, Matthew Pierog, Raphaella Spence, Bernardo Torrens and Doug Webb.

== Artists involved ==
- Anthony Brunelli
- Clive Head
- Bertrand Menie
- Raphaella Spence

== Writers involved ==
- Michael Paraskos
- Gregory Saraceno
