= Front Elevation for a Monument to the Unknown Soldier =

1917 painting by Antonio Sciortino

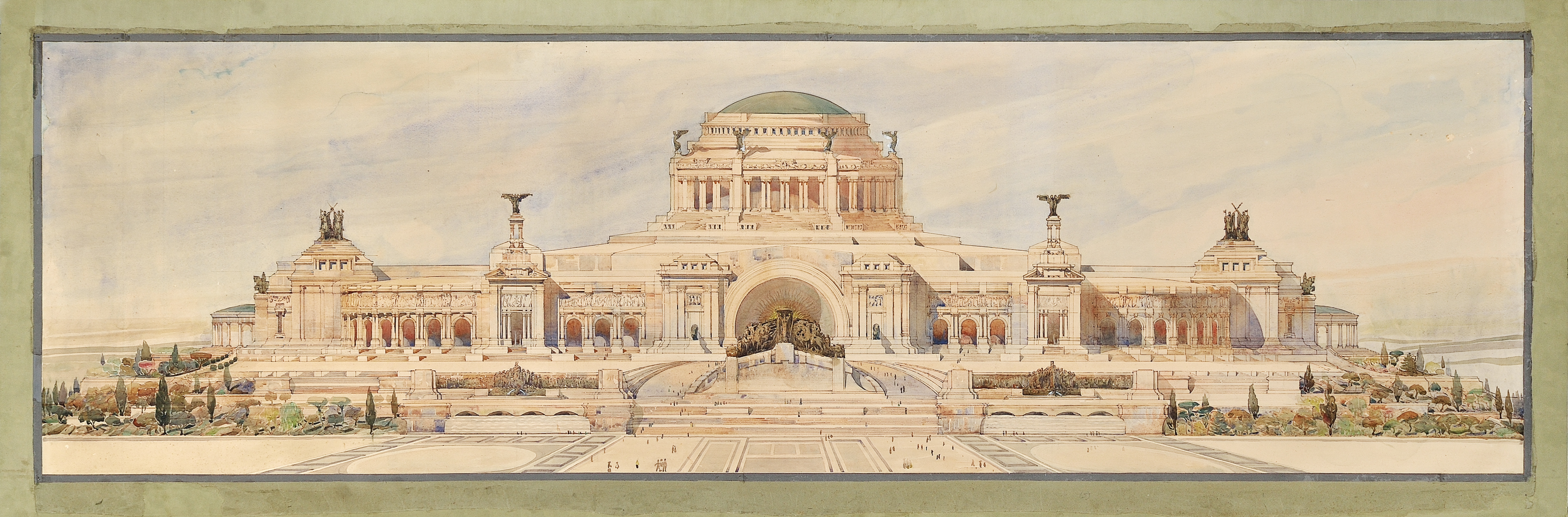
- Artist: Antonio Sciortino
- Year: 1917
- Medium: watercolour and gouache
- Dimensions: 64.5 cm × 220.5 cm (25.4 in × 86.8 in)
- Location: MUŻA, Valletta, Malta

Front Elevation for a Monument to the Unknown Soldier is a painting by Antonio Sciortino, from 1917.

== Description ==
The painting is a watercolour and gouache with dimensions of 64.5 x 220.5 centimeters. It is in the collection of MUŻA in Valletta, Malta.

== Analysis ==
The drawing is for a proposed monument in London.

== Sources ==
- Dennis Vella, ed. (2000). Antonio Sciortino: Monuments and Public Sculpture. National Museum of Fine Arts. ISBN 978-99932-11-02-0.
- Antonio Sciortino, 1879–1947. C. Busuttil. 1997.
- Giuseppe Schembri Bonaci; Sarah Moulden; Marjorie Trusted (2012). Antonio Sciortino and the British Academy of Arts in Rome. Horizons. ISBN 978-99957-38-10-5.
