= Irsee =

- Municipality
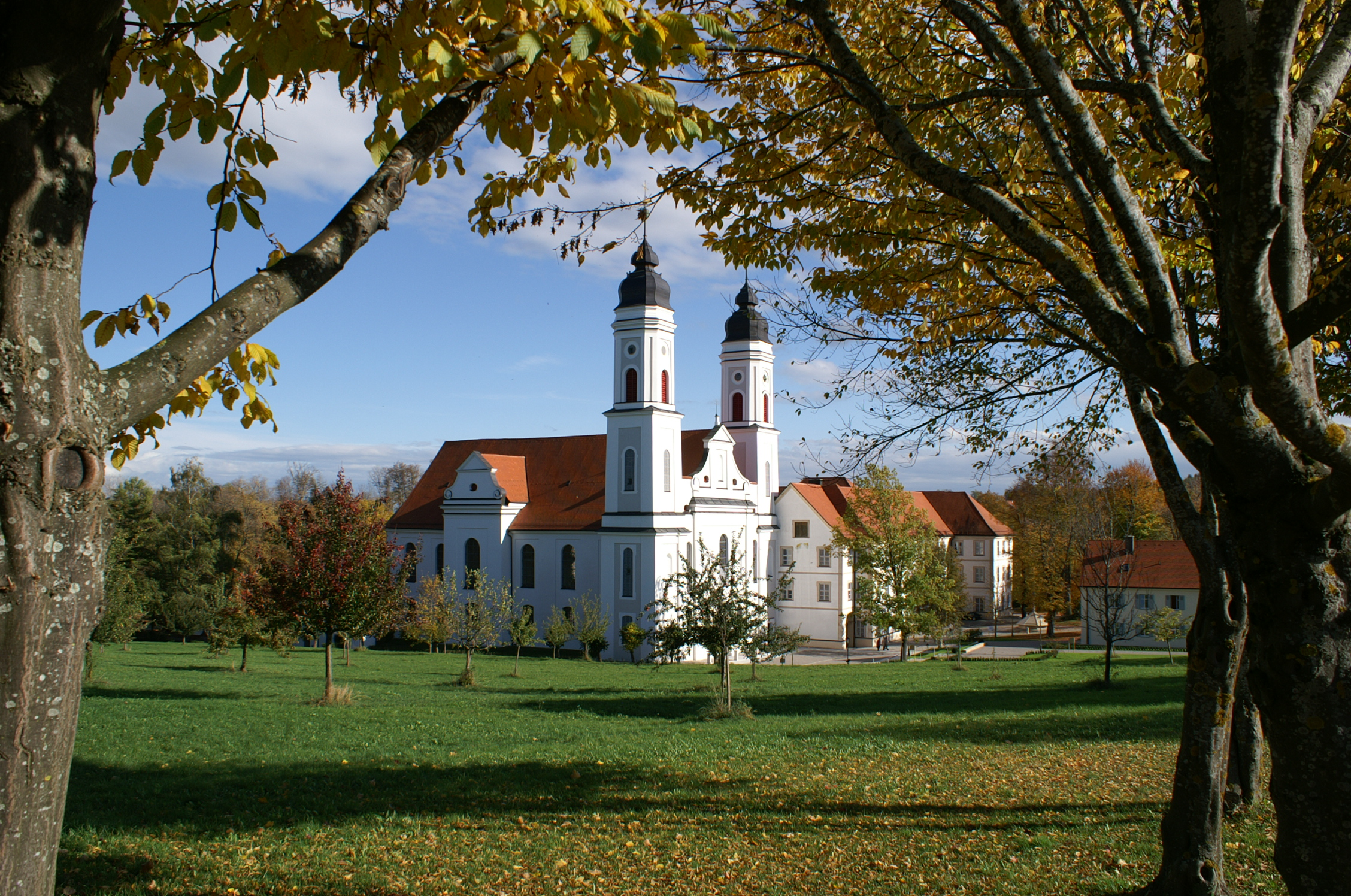
- Church of the Assumption of the Virgin Mary and Saints Peter and Paul at the Irsee Monastery

- Coat of arms

- Location of Irsee within Ostallgäu district
- Interactive map of Irsee
- Location within Germany Location within Bavaria
- Coordinates: 47°54′N 10°34′E
- Country: Germany
- State: Bavaria
- Admin. region: Schwaben
- District: Ostallgäu
- Municipal assoc.: Pforzen

Government
  - Mayor (2020–26): Andreas Lieb

Area
  - Total: 17.44 km^{2} (6.73 sq mi)
- Elevation: 755 m (2,477 ft)

Population (2025-12-31)
  - Total: 1,611
  - Density: 92.37/km^{2} (239.2/sq mi)
- Time zone: UTC+01:00 (CET)
  - Summer (DST): UTC+02:00 (CEST)
- Postal codes: 87660
- Dialling codes: 08341
- Vehicle registration: OAL
- Website: www.irsee.de

Irsee (German pronunciation: [ˈɪʁzeː]) is a village and municipality in the district of Ostallgäu in Bavaria in Germany.

The centre of the village is dominated by a monastery (Klosterbau), dedicated to the Virgin Mary The monastery was founded in 1186 by Margrave Henry of Ronsberg to house a community that had grown up around a local hermit. It came close to collapse in the 14th century, when the community was reduced to a single monk, and was saved only by the intervention in 1373 of Anna von Ellerbach, the second founder, sister of the Bishop of Augsburg, and her appointee, abbot Conrad III, known for his extreme frugality. After severe losses during both the German Peasants' War in 1525 and the Thirty Years' War in the 17th century, including on both occasions the destruction of the library and on the second occasion of the archives, the abbey was finally able to put itself back on a stable footing in the later 17th century, and at length in 1694 was granted Imperial immediacy, becoming an Imperial abbey (German Reichsabtei). The monastery was dissolved in the German mediatization of 1802, when its lands became a part of Bavaria. The greater part of the library was moved to Metten Abbey.

In 1812 accommodation for a parish priest and local officials was set up in the monastery buildings. From 1849 the premises were used as an asylum and hospital for the mentally ill.

== History ==
=== T-4 Euthanasia program ===
Between 1939 and 1945 more than 2,000 patients, both adults and children, were transported by the Nazi regime from Irsee and Kaufbeuren to death camps, or were killed in Irsee by starvation or injection. The then prison director and psychiatrist Valentin Faltlhauser was held responsible for this. Since 1981 a sculpture by sculptor Martin Wank in the former institution recalls these events.

In the mid-1990s, a memorial for the victims of Nazi "euthanasia" was set up in the former morgue of the Irsee Health and Care Institute. In the anteroom is the large triptych, I would like to ask you even more politely to answer the following questions (1996) created by the Munich artist Beate Passow. She combined three of the perpetrators' photographs of victims with excerpts from the correspondence between Valentin Faltlhauser and Georg Hensel, a senior physician at the Kinderheilstätte Mittelberg near Oy im Allgäu from 1939 to 1946 who carried out TB tests on disabled children in Kaufbeuren-Irsee.

In 2009, three stumbling blocks by the Cologne artist Gunter Demnig were moved in front of the Irsee Abbey. Representing all the patients murdered in Irsee were Maria Rosa Bechter, Anna Brieger, and Ernst Lossa.

== Current uses ==
In 1972 the hospital was closed. The local authorities of the district of Schwaben began the restoration of the buildings in 1974, which opened as the Schwäbische Tagungs- und Bildungszentrum Kloster Irsee ("Kloster Irsee Swabian Conference and Training Centre") in 1984. The Conference Centre is home to the Schwabenakademie and is used for a variety of events. The annual Irseer Pegasus writers' conference takes place every January, and the center hosts the Kunstleben, an annual art festival, organised by the Schwabenakademie in co-operation with the University of Augsburg. It was whilst teaching on this in 2007 that the painter Clive Head and art theorist Michael Paraskos began to formulate the New Aesthetics movement in art.
