= Clive Head =

British artist

- Born: 1965 (age 60–61); Maidstone, Kent
- Education: University of Aberystwyth
- Known for: Painting
- Notable work: The Looking Glass, oil on canvas, 2014
- Movement: The New Aesthetics
- Patrons: City of London Corporation, Victoria and Albert Museum, Imperial College

Clive Head (born 1965) is an English painter.

== Biography ==
Head was born in Maidstone, Kent, the son of a machine operator at Reed's Paper Mill in Aylesford. Head showed talent in art and at the age of 11 attended Reed's Art Club, a social club organised at his father's factory. He was a pupil of Maidstone Grammar School. In 1983 he began studying for a degree in Fine Art at Aberystwyth University under the tutorship of the abstract painter David Tinker. Here he also became friends with another painter, Steve Whitehead, with whom he would later exhibit and collaborate as a teacher of art. After completing his degree, and a short period of postgraduate study at Lancaster University, Head began showing at the Colin Jellicoe Gallery in Manchester and with the art dealer Nicholas Treadwell.

In 1994 Head founded and became the Chair of the Fine Art Department at the University of York's Scarborough Campus, where he again teamed up with Steve Whitehead, and became friends with the art theorist and Head of Art History Michael Paraskos. Here he also befriended the artist Jason Brooks. During this period most of Head's work was in a neo-classical figurative style, and these works were shown with those of Brooks at the Paton Gallery, London in 1995. Head then moved on to producing urban realist paintings, closer in theme and style to the work he had made as an art student in Aberystwyth.

In 1999 Head gave up teaching and signed to Blains Fine Art (later called the Haunch of Venison Gallery) in London and with the gallery run by the founder of the Photorealist art movement, Louis K. Meisel Fine Art in New York, even though Head was not in Meisel's eyes, a Photorealist painter. Nonetheless, the connection with Meisel led to Head being included in several editions of Meisel's survey books on Photorealist painting, particularly in the sections dealing with contemporary painters whom Meisel suggested had moved beyond old-fashioned Photorealism.

Also stemming from the connection with Meisel, in 2003 Head joined Michael Paraskos in taking part in The Prague Project the first of a series of group visits by figurative painters to different cities around the world, out of which paintings were produced for a group exhibition. The work produced during the Prague Project was exhibited at the Roberson Museum and Science Center, Binghamton, New York in 2004.

In 2005 Head was commissioned by the Museum of London to produce a painting of Buckingham Palace to celebrate the Golden Jubilee of Elizabeth II.

However, also in 2005 Head was debilitated by a neurological disease that had a devastating effect on his muscles. Despite still suffering from this condition, Head continued painting and the scale of his work became larger, but with an increasing focus on London as long-distance travel became difficult for him. With this renewed focus on the United Kingdom, in 2005 Head joined Marlborough Fine Art in London and in his work began to use London subject matter.

In 2007 he worked again with Michael Paraskos at the Schwäbische Kunstsommer, at the University of Augsburg, Irsee, Germany, and since then Head and Paraskos have collaborated in publishing and lecturing on what they call The New Aesthetics, and again with Paraskos as a visiting artist at the Cyprus College of Art in 2010.

In October and November 2010 three paintings were exhibited at the National Gallery, London.

In September 2012 Paraskos arranged for a display of Head's work alongside that of Nicolas Poussin at Dulwich Picture Gallery in London, and in September 2014 Head exhibited at the Sainsbury Centre for Visual Arts in Norwich as part of the exhibition Reality: Modern and Contemporary British Painting curated by Chris Stevens.

== Style and philosophy ==
Stylistically Head is almost unique in contemporary British art in the way he has developed a highly personal language of art that is focused very specifically on painting. Arguably this makes him one of the leading British painters of his generation as most of his contemporaries have chosen to explore other art forms and materials. Very early on Head developed a realist style of painting, often mistaken for Photorealism, but his most recent work has moved firmly away from this. In part this is a consequence of an increasing interest in recent years in the work of modernist painters such as Henri Matisse and Georges Braque, but it also stems from a natural evolution of his basic painting process. Even when producing ostensibly realist paintings Head always maintained that his work was not concerned with the visual appearance of the world, but with the full sensual experience of being in a particular place over a period of time. In recent work this has led to overtly composite or layered images, in which time and movement play a more significant role than the creation of something that can be mistaken for a photographic snap shot. In this, Head's connection to the New Aesthetics seems significant as the New Aesthetics is a deliberate attempt to reinvent the concept of the avant-garde based on the sensual engagement with reality and the physical engagement with the materials of art, such as paint.

Head's starting point for any painting is to stand in a specific location, such as the entrance to a London Underground station or a coffee shop, where he will gather information by sketching, photographing or simply experiencing the scene. The end point, however, is never to recreate an image of that location, but to use that information and experience to invent an artificial world that convinces the viewer of its own independent reality. This sets up a complex relationship in Head's paintings, between their resemblance to somewhere we might know, like a London street, and Head's insistence that we are in fact looking through a framed 'window' at another reality.

Significantly this stands in stark contrast to the tendency amongst artists in the latter half of the twentieth century to define art using Marcel Duchamp's claim that anything is art when an artist says it is art. Instead Head has proclaimed that true art works define themselves, and are art works regardless of whether an artist, or critic, or even wider society says they are art works. Similarly a work of non-art cannot become art just because an artist, or critic, or wider society says it is an art work. This self-possession of the status of being art work is, according to Head, either present or not present, and the work either functions as art or it does not function as art, in the same way a tree is a tree and does not require a human or social definition to allow it to function as a tree. It just functions as a tree by itself. This self-definition of the art work is given the name "metastoicheiosis".

One of the primary differences between Head's painted realities and the reality of everyday life lies in the way space is defined. Head does not present a vista or view like a camera, he shows an entire environment over time, and if we were to try to replicate seeing one of his environments in real life we could not do it by visiting the location. As a consequence Head's paintings are more like the record of a living human body wandering around a location, rather than a static snapshot of a part of it. Consequently, his work most closely resembles a movie camera panning around a scene, but the closest painting equivalent is in the multiple viewpoints, shifts of scale and games played with time seen in a Cubist painting by Picasso or Braque. In earlier works Head used a realist language of painting to render his experience into something coherent and whole. However, in later paintings the disjuncture of time and space remained visible in the paintings.

In interviews Head has always insisted that the language of realism he uses is not the same as the language of photography, and it is true that his paintings do not resemble photographs. Indeed, Head has been consistently critical of the futility of painters copying photographs. In this Head's previous work as a neo-classical painter is significant as his spatial constructions are derived from classical ideas of perspective rather than being imported from a camera, computer or other machine. In this it appears significant that Head has stated that his use of perspective is not bound by pre-determined rules in a mechanical way, but evolves during the process of making each individual painting a process a camera cannot match. This means there is no pre-determined vanishing point, where all the lines of perspective meet, but what Head calls 'vanishing zones'. Head has also stated he 'rejects the Modernist fragmentation and instead seek a seamless surface.'

For his subject matter, Head tends towards urban scenes, particularly London, although he has also painted New York, Moscow, Los Angeles, Prague, Rome and Paris, amongst other places.

Most recently Head has written of himself as a kind of anarchist artist, although he qualifies this by defining himself as a 'private anarchist' rather than a 'political anarchist'. This seems to relate to the increasingly definite anarchist artistic position Michael Paraskos has pursued in recent years, and in particular Paraskos's notion of anarchist art being an attempt to visualise an alternative reality outside society and culture. Paraskos has in effect defined culture in political terms as a manifestation of the predetermined state that imposes its will on the individual. In Head this translates into an opposition to predetermined visual imagery. The most straightforward example of predetermined imagery is photography, but for Head it is not the use of photography itself that is the problem, it is the adoption of the predetermined, or imposed, language of the photograph by the painter. Notably Head also opposes other, non-photographic, solutions to pictorial problems where those solutions are also predetermined, such as systemic art and contemporary Salon Painting. Consequently, an analogy is made between the political anarchists' desire for a society in which predetermined structures such as those offered by the state are abolished, and the artistic anarchists' desire for an art world in which predetermined, or clichéd, solutions to visual problems are also abolished.

== Public collections ==
Clive Head has work in:

- Imperial College London (St Mary's Hospital)
- Victoria and Albert Museum (London)
- The Museum of London
- Maria Lucia and Ingo Klöcker Collection (Bad Homburg, Germany)

== Notable exhibitions ==
- 2004 Roberson Museum and Science Centre, Binghamton, New York (USA)
- 2006 Peninsular Fine Arts Centre, Newport News (Virginia, USA)
- 2010 National Gallery, London (UK)
- 2010 Kunsthal, Rotterdam (Netherlands)
- 2011 Galerie de Bellefeuille, Montreal (Canada)
- 2012 Dulwich Picture Gallery, London (UK)
- 2013 Wilhelm Lehmbruck Museum, Duisburg (Germany)
- 2013 Kunsthalle Tübingen (Germany)
- 2013 Museo Thyssen‐Bornemisza, Madrid (Spain)
- 2014 Museo de Bellas Artes, Bilbao (Spain)
- 2014 Sainsbury Centre for Visual Arts, Norwich (UK)
