= Barrie Cook =

British abstract artist (1929–2020)

Barrie Cook (1929 – 13 July 2020) was a British abstract artist who lived and worked on The Lizard in Cornwall, England.

His works are held in national collections including Tate, Birmingham Museum and Art Gallery, The Arts Council & the Government Art Collection. and he had regularly exhibited in individual and group shows.

He taught at Coventry College of Art, Cardiff College of Art, Birmingham Polytechnic and the University of Wales. He was Head of Department at Stourbridge College of Art on the 1970s.

== Biography ==
Born in Birmingham in 1929, Cook served in the Army during World War II. He married Mary, in Birmingham in 1951 whilst a student at Birmingham College of Art (1949–1954). Cook began teaching immediately after leaving College. His final teaching post was at the University of Wales in Cardiff, after which he moved to Cornwall in 1992.

Cook's influences included Mark Rothko, Patrick Heron, Terry Frost, and Bridget Riley. He pioneered the use of air brushing as a painterly medium and considers his paintings 'opportunity for meditation'. Many paintings begin from photographs that capture play of light or movement. For example, work created whilst living in Cardiff was meant to represent the passing of car headlights through the well-lit area he lived in. Many paintings are abstract patterns that could be considered 'Op Art' because of the hypnotising and disorienting effect they have on your eyesight. Cook often produced a series of works, one of which was 'Continuum' 1967–1971 four paintings of which hung at the Serpentine Gallery forming an exhibition in 1988.

Cook had continued to work in his studio, a converted Chapel in Ruan Minor, Cornwall, every day. He often re-visited older pieces experimenting with variations.

Artworks in notable collections: Government Art Collection Hot Rod, 1977 and No. 2 Untitled 1976 Tate Gallery Painting, 1970 Birmingham Gallery of Art Dean, 1977,

MOMA (Museum of Modern Art) Wales is on until November 2015

Cook is listed on the Cornwall Artist Index, review of his last exhibition in London

== Personal life ==
Cook and his wife Mary lived in Mullion and had two children, four grandchildren and five great grandchildren.

They were active members of the community, taking part in local horticultural shows and supporting local establishments. Both their children are now retired; his daughter was a teacher specialising in play in primary school education and his son worked as a publisher.

Barrie Cook died on 13 July 2020, aged 91. His wife outlived him by only two days, dying on 15 July.

His Mullion home is now owned by Josh Widdicombe and his wife Rose Hanson
