= Holly Trusted =

Curator and academic

Holly Trusted FSA
- Born: 1955 (age 70–71)

Academic background
- Education: Cambridge University, Courtauld Institute of Art

Academic work
- Institutions: Victoria and Albert Museum
- Notable works: The Arts of Spain: Iberia and Latin America 1450–1700; The Making of Sculpture: the materials and techniques of European sculpture

Marjorie Trusted, also known as Holly Trusted, is a historian of European sculpture. Previously Senior Curator of Sculpture at the Victoria and Albert Museum she is known in particular for her work on British and Spanish sculpture and was the lead curator for the Victoria and Albert Museum Cast Courts. Since January 2019, she has been an Honorary Senior Research Fellow at the Victoria and Albert Museum. She was Honorary Vice-President of the Society of Antiquaries of London in 2018–19.

== Education ==
Trusted was educated at The Maynard School, Exeter and left in 1973. She gained her BA and her PhD at the University of Cambridge, and her MA at the Courtauld Institute of Art.

== Career ==
Trusted joined the Victoria and Albert Museum in 1979, where she worked on British and Spanish sculpture as well as extensively on European decorative arts in the V&A collection such as ambers, ivories, and medals. She has lectured and published widely. As Senior Curator of Sculpture, she was the lead curator for the redevelopment of the V&A Cast Courts, which opened in 2018. She gave the keynote lecture at The Royal Institute for Cultural Heritage (KIK-IRPA, Brussels) conference Uniqueness and Multiplication: Plaster as an Art Material in October 2017 on the Cast Courts project.

In 2008 she jointly curated an exhibition entitled The Return of the Gods at Tate Britain with Tim Knox and Helen Dorey (Sir John Soane’s Museum), and Martin Myrone (Tate Britain). The exhibition was the first in Britain to focus on British neoclassical sculpture. The exhibition included works by Thomas Banks, Antonio Canova, Joseph Nollekens, and Bertel Thorvaldsen.

In January 2019, she was appointed an Honorary Senior Research Fellow at the V&A, and continued to research and lecture on art history while working on a book on German baroque sculpture, which was published in 2022. She is currently Senior Research Fellow of the University of Glasgow, and Senior Research Fellow of Durham University. She served on the vetting committee of TEFAF Maastricht in March 2019 and in June 2022 for Western Sculptures up to 1830. She is co-chair and co-founder of the Public Statues and Sculpture Association, established in 2020. As Senior Research Fellow of Durham University she catalogued the sculpture collection at the Spanish Gallery in Bishop Auckland, a collection formed by Jonathan Ruffer from 2012 onwards. She is a Visiting Fellow at the Clark Art Institute in Massachusetts (2025) and is currently working on a book on the Spanish baroque sculptor Luisa Roldán with Catherine Hall-van den Elsen.

Trusted's work on The Arts of Spain: Iberia and Latin America 1450–1700 (2007) was praised as "excellent" and "highly reliable". Her work on the baroque and later ivory collections at the Victoria and Albert Museum led to a major publication in 2013, Baroque & Later Ivories, which was praised in review for its detailed approach to the subject and described as a "veritable magnum opus".

== Extramural roles ==
Trusted was elected a member of the Society of Antiquaries of London in October 1999 and served as Honorary Vice-President in 2018–19. She was the founding editor of the Sculpture Journal in 1997. She was appointed Honorary President of ARTES, Iberian and Latin American Visual Culture Group, an association she co-founded in 2000, from 2022 to 2025. She is also co-founder and co-chair of the international Ivory Studies Group, founded in 2009, which meets annually to study and discuss collections of post-medieval ivory sculpture. During 2025 she was a Research Fellow at the Clark Art Institute, Massachusetts.

== Personal life ==
Trusted has two children. She divides her time between Oxfordshire and London.

== Selected publications ==
Trusted publishes under the name Marjorie Trusted.

- Catalogue of European Ambers in the Victoria and Albert Museum (V&A Publications, 1985)
- German Renaissance Medals: a catalogue of the collection in the Victoria and Albert Museum (V&A Publications, 1990)
- Spanish Sculpture: catalogue of the post-medieval Spanish sculpture in wood, terracotta, alabaster, marble, stone, lead and jet in the Victoria and Albert Museum (V&A Publications, 1996)
- with Diane Bilbey British Sculpture 1470 to 2000: a concise catalogue of the collection at the Victoria and Albert Museum (V&A Publications, 2002)
- "Exotic Devotion: Sculpture in Viceregal America and Brazil, 1520–1820", in Joseph J. Rishel The Arts in Latin America, 1492–1820, (Philadelphia Museum of Art, 2006) 248–257.
- The Making of Sculpture: the materials and techniques of European sculpture (V&A Publications, 2007)
- The Arts of Spain: Iberia and Latin America 1450–1700 (V&A Publications, 2007)
- with Helen Dorey and Tim Knox The Return of the Gods: neoclassical sculpture in Britain (Tate Britain, London, 2008)
- "Survivors of a Shipwreck: Ivories from a Manila Galleon of 1601", Hispanic Research Journal (2013) 14:5, 446-462
- Baroque & Later Ivories (V&A Publications, 2013).
- contributor to Sculpture Victorious: art in an age of invention, 1837–1901 (New Haven: Yale University Press: Yale Center for British Art, 2014)
- contributor to A Reservoir of Ideas: essays in honour of Paul Williamson (V&A Publications, 2017)
- co-editor with Joanna Barnes, Toppling Statues: papers from the 2020 PSSA webinar co-hosted by the Burlington Magazine (Public Statues & Sculpture Association, 2021)
- Baroque Sculpture in Germany and Central Europe 1600–1770 (Brepols/Harvey Miller, 2022)
- co-editor with Joanna Barnes, Discovering Women Sculptors (Public Statues and Sculpture Association, 2023)
- co-editor with Joanna Barnes and Dominique Fleischmann, Arthur Fleischmann in Context (Public Statues and Sculpture Association, 2025)
