= Jim Ede =

British art collector (1895–1990)

- Born: 7 March 1895; Penarth, Wales
- Died: 15 March 1990 (aged 95); Edinburgh, Scotland
- Known for: Kettle's Yard; Art collecting
- Spouse: Helen Schlapp

Harold Stanley Ede (7 April 1895 – 15 March 1990), also known as Jim Ede and H. S. Ede, was a British curator, collector of art and friend to artists. He was the creator of Kettle's Yard in Cambridge.

== Life and career ==
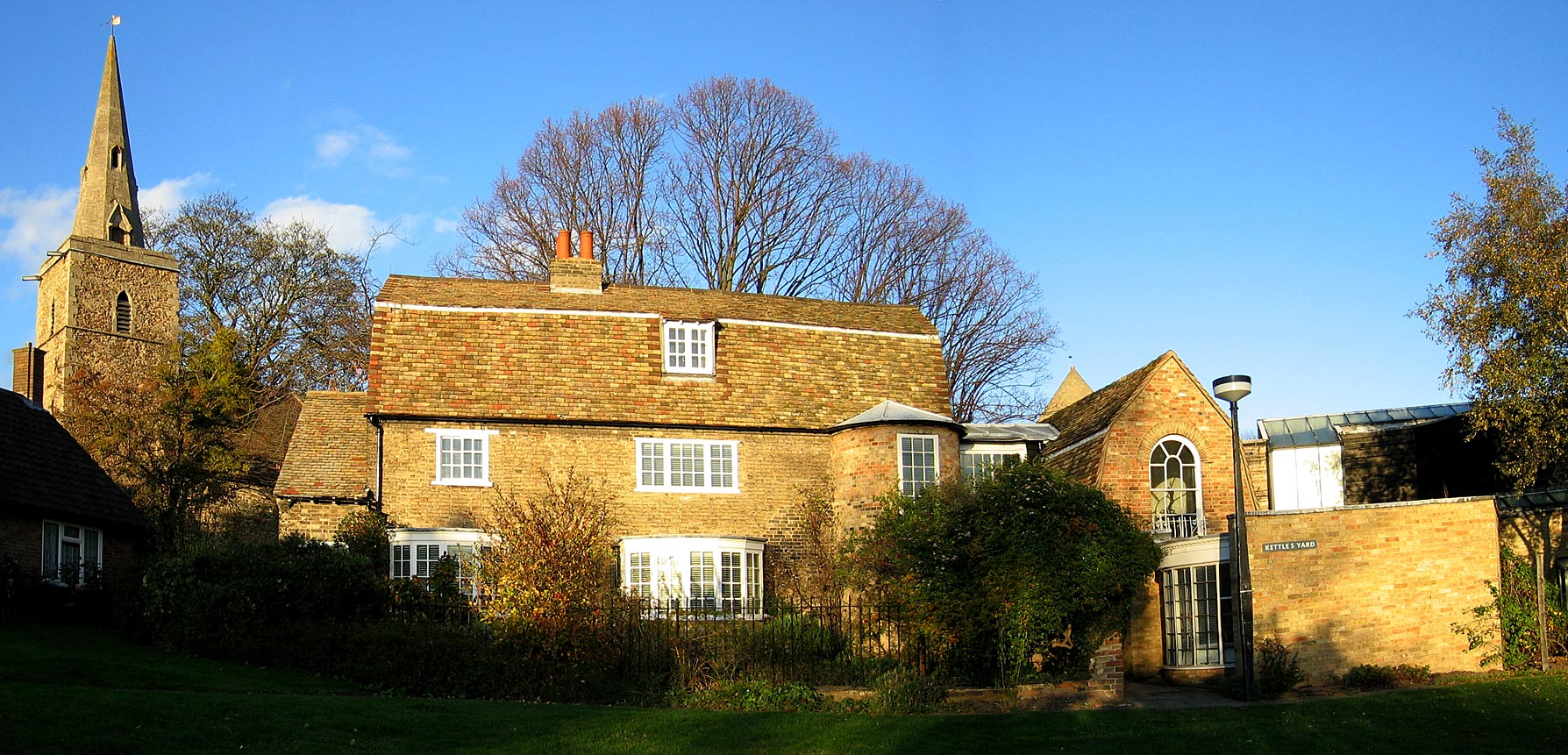
Kettle's Yard, Cambridge

Jim Ede was born in Penarth, Wales, the son of solicitor Edward Hornby Ede and Mildred, a teacher.

He attended the Leys School in Cambridge (1909-12). He began to train as a painter under Stanhope Forbes at Newlyn and then at Edinburgh College of Art before the First World War interrupted his studies. He was commissioned in September 1914, serving with the South Wales Borderers and the Indian Army. He relinquished his commission in consequence of ill health, and was granted the rank of captain, 29 July 1919.

After the war, he continued his studies at the Slade School of Art. In 1921, Ede became assistant curator at the National Gallery of British Art (renamed the Tate Gallery in 1932) in London while continuing to study part-time at the Slade. Shortly after, he married Helen Schlapp whom he had met in Edinburgh. Her father Otto Schlapp lectured at the University of Edinburgh and in 1926 became the University's first Professor of German. Robert Schlapp was her brother.

While working at the Tate, Ede tried to promote the work of contemporary artists, including Picasso and Mondrian. However, he was often thwarted by the more conservative attitudes of the gallery directors. During his time at the Tate, Ede formed numerous friendships with avant-garde artists of the day. In the process, he acquired many works of art that were largely under-appreciated at the time.

In 1927 Ede had acquired Sophie Brzeska's estate from the Treasury Solicitor after she died intestate in 1925. This acquisition included not only her writings, but also the estate of Henri Gaudier-Brzeska, with many of his works and papers. Ede drew extensively on the letters written by Gaudier to Brzeska, and her writings and other material, when he published A Life of Gaudier-Brzeska (London: W. Heinemann) in 1930; the 1931 and later editions are entitled Savage Messiah. Ede's book became the basis of Ken Russell's film of the same name.

== Middle years ==
In 1936, Ede tired of fighting the establishment at the Tate and left to live in Morocco, building a house outside Tangiers. Somewhat ahead of his time, he adopted a minimalist style of interior design advocating plain white-washed walls and the minimum of furniture required to complete a room. For the next twenty years, he led an itinerant life, writing, broadcasting and lecturing in Europe and America, while keeping the house in Morocco as a base.

His correspondence with T. E. Lawrence was published by the Golden Cockerel Press in 1942. The collection of forty-four original letters from Lawrence were donated to the University of Essex by Ede in 1964.

== Artistic legacy ==
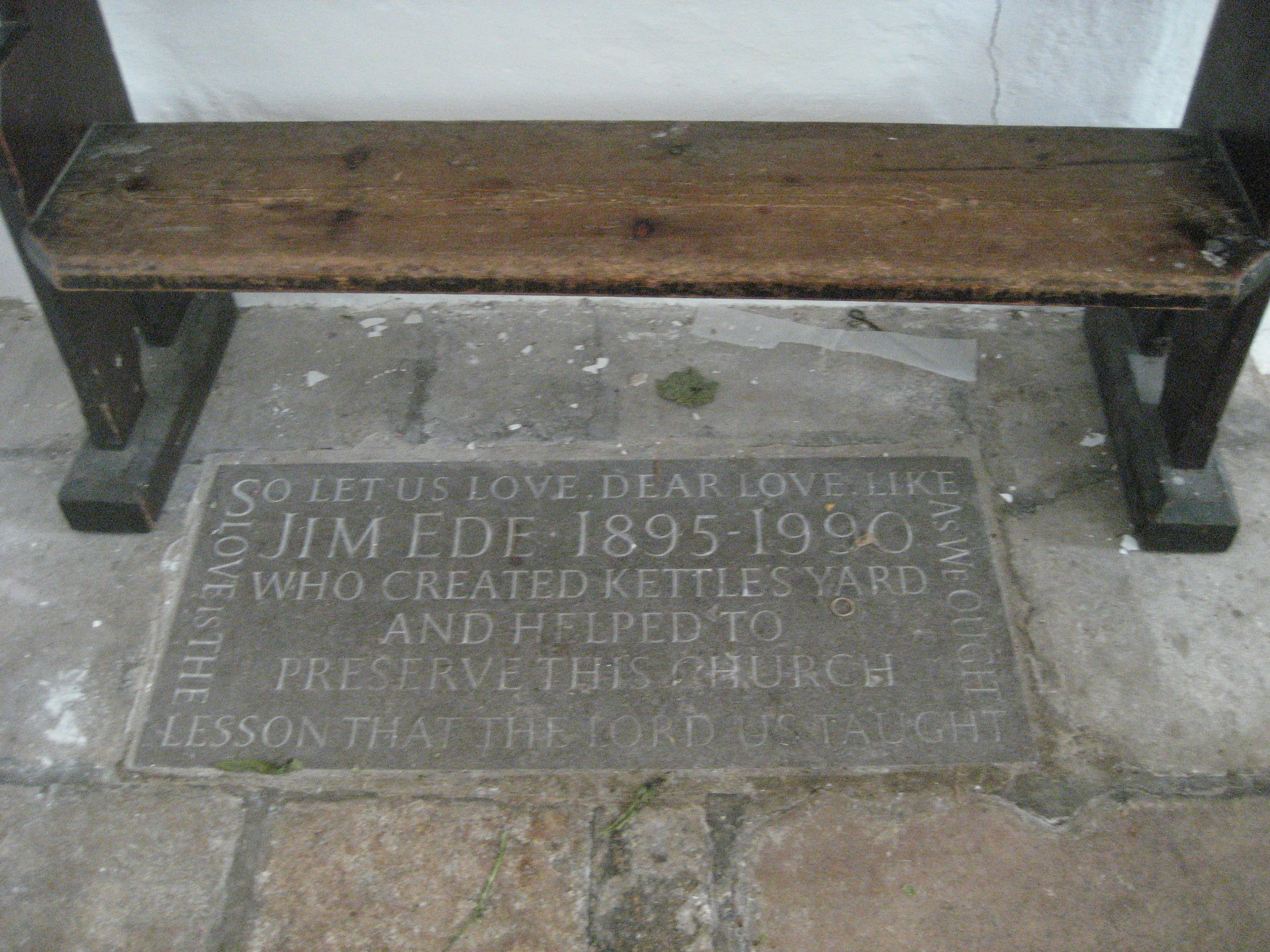
Ede's memorial stone in St Peter's Church, Cambridge, adjacent to Kettle's Yard

Returning to England in 1956, Ede converted four cottages in Cambridge with the help of Winton Aldridge as a place to live and display his art collection. It was part of his philosophy that art should be shared in a relaxed environment; to this end he would hold 'open house', giving personal tours of the collection to students from the University of Cambridge over afternoon tea. Students could also borrow paintings from his collection to hang in their rooms during term-time.

In 1966, Ede gave the house and collection to the university, establishing the Kettle's Yard art gallery. Ede continued living there until 1973 when he moved to Edinburgh where he lived out his retirement.

The house is preserved as the Edes left it. In 1970, an exhibition gallery was added to Kettle's Yard in a modernist style by Leslie Martin and this was extended by Jamie Fobert Architects from 2015. The Edes retired to Edinburgh, where Helen died in 1977.

Ede died in Edinburgh on 15 March 1990.

== Publications ==
- Savage Messiah, H. S. Ede, Heinemann (1931) — Biography of the sculptor Henri Gaudier-Brzeska. Reprinted, Kettle's Yard Gallery (1971), ISBN 0-900406-15-1.
- Shaw—Ede, T. E. Lawrence’s Letters to H. S. Ede 1927-1935 H. S. Ede (ed.), London, Golden Cockerel Press, (1942), 500 copies.
- Savage Messiah: a biography of the sculptor Henri Gaudier-Brzeska; with new texts by Sebastiano Barassi, Evelyn Silber and Jon Wood. Leeds: Henry Moore Institute, (2011) ISBN 1-905462-34-4
- A Way of Life, H. S. Ede, Kettle's Yard Gallery, ISBN 0-907074-57-X. Guide to Kettle's Yard and its collection.
- Kettle's Yard and its Artists, ed. Michael Harrison, Cambridge (2009) ISBN 978-1-904561-33-0

== See also ==
- Savage Messiah
