= Steve Whitehead =

British painter (born 1960)

- Born: Coventry, England, UK
- Education: University of Aberystwyth
- Known for: Painting
- Movement: Realism
- Patrons: Aberystwyth University, Cyngor Sir Ceredigion

Steve Whitehead is a British painter, known especially for his landscapes.

== Early life and education ==
Steve Whitehead was born in Coventry, England.

He studied at the Aberystwyth University, with David Tinker, graduating with an MA in Fine Art in the mid-1980s, before continuing his studies at the Courtauld Institute of Art in London.

== Career and practice ==
Whitehead is predominantly a landscape painter, although he also produces figure compositions. His art is sometimes described as a form of photorealism, although according to the art critic Michael Paraskos it is more like a poetic realism, as Whitehead does not simply reproduce photographs in paint, but creates composite images, drawing on many photographs and historic art images. In particular, Whitehead's art is influenced by the landscape traditions of northern European romantics, such as Caspar David Friedrich, and the realism of the Biedermeier realist painters.

He taught fine art at the University of Hull and is a regular visiting artist at the Cyprus College of Art.

== Recognition and awards ==
Whitehead has twice won the Wales Open and has also been a prizewinner in Manchester Academy and Hunting Art Prizes exhibitions.

Whitehead is the subject of a book by the art critic Michael Paraskos published in 2008.

== Collections ==
His paintings are held in the permanent collection of the Contemporary Art Society for Wales.
