= Anthony Frost =

English painter (born 1951)

Anthony Frost (born 1951) is a British painter noted for his abstract works consisting of brightly coloured prints and collages.

== Biography ==
Frost was born in St. Ives, Cornwall, the son of Sir Terry Frost. From 1970 to 1973 he studied at the Cardiff College of Art gaining a BA (Hons) in Fine Art. His work featured in the "Art Now Cornwall" exhibition at Tate St Ives in 2007.

He has been Artist-in-residence at the Cyprus College of Art, Paphos and the Montmiral School of Painting, France.

Frost is a fan of The Fall and his work appears on a number of their record covers, most notably Extricate.

The painter's works are included in the public art collections of the Kasser Mochary Foundation, New York and King's College, Cambridge.

== Personal life ==
Frost works at a studio in Penzance and lives in the hamlet of Rosemergy. He is the brother of actor and comedian Stephen Frost.

== See also ==
- List of St. Ives artists
- Luke Frost
