= Kevork Malikyan =

Armenian-English actor and teacher (born 1943)

- Born: 2 June 1943 (age 83); Diyarbakır, Turkey
- Education: Rose Bruford College
- Years active: 1968–present
- Spouse: Maida Kupelian (m. 1965)
- Children: 2, including Sevan Malikyan

Kevork Malikyan (born 2 June 1943) is an Armenian-English actor and teacher. He is known for his roles as Kazim in the film Indiana Jones and the Last Crusade (1989), Max Papandrious in the television sitcom Mind Your Language (1977–1979), Rady in the film Flight of the Phoenix (2004), and Parvus in Payitaht: Abdülhamid (2017).

== Early life ==
Malikyan was born to Armenian parents in Diyarbakır, Turkey. When he was 10 years old, an archbishop decided to open a religious seminary in Üsküdar, Istanbul, with the intention of taking in the poor children of Armenian parents from various parts of Turkey and bringing them up as priests. Malikyan was questioned by a priest who wanted to determine whether or not he was a good candidate for the priesthood. His father told him to go to the seminary because he could not afford to give him an education due to financial problems. Though Malikyan was worried because he had no friends in Istanbul and had to leave his parents behind, he went to the city to become a priest.

Malikyan was sent to the Karagözyan Orphanage in Şişli where he spent two years before attending the religious seminary in Üsküdar. In the seminary, there was a small stage where the students acted in Turkish and Armenian. When he was 16, an Anglican priest was invited to the school to teach them English. He was an Oxford graduate who wrote history books. The man was also fond of acting and had prepared Richard III by Shakespeare in English, wherein Malikyan played Richard. The priest must have liked Malikyan's acting, because he told the headmaster of the school that Malikyan should become an actor rather than a priest. The patriarch asked Malikyan his opinion on the matter, but Malikyan was unsure because of financial concerns. Father Harding, a British priest, found him a scholarship in Britain.

Malikyan graduated from the Surp Haç Armenian High School in Istanbul, then moved to London in 1963 for acting education. At the drama school Rose Bruford College, he received diplomas for acting and teaching.

== Career ==
Malikyan made his first television appearance in an episode of the historical drama The Portrait of a Lady in 1968, playing the role of ‘servant’. Throughout the last years of the 1960s Malikyan made other numerous television appearances including Doctor Who, The Saint, and The Avengers. Malikyan got his big break in the British film The Man Who Haunted Himself in 1970, starring Roger Moore, in which Malikyan played Luigi the butler of the Pelham family.

In 1977, Malikyan embarked on his most notable role on television, in the ITV sitcom Mind Your Language, which was about an adult education centre and followed the story to the ‘English as a foreign language’ class. In the series Malikyan played Maximilian (Max) Papandrious, a Greek shipping worker from Athens. The show was very successful and at its height attracted 18 million viewers, Malikyan appeared in 29 episodes from 1977 to the series conclusion in 1979. Although the series was briefly revived in 1986 he did not make any appearances in it. Malikyan's next big film role came in the 1978 prison film Midnight Express, in which he played the part of the prosecutor at Billy Hayes's trial. The film was directed by Alan Parker and starred Brad Davis, Irene Miracle and Bo Hopkins. The film was very popular and went on to win two Academy Awards. His performance did not go unnoticed, one director who especially noticed him was Steven Spielberg. Malikyan tried to audition for the part of Sallah in Raiders of the Lost Ark, but was prevented from doing so by heavy traffic.

In 1988, Spielberg cast Malikyan in the third in the Indiana Jones series, Indiana Jones and the Last Crusade in which he played Kazim, the leader of the Brotherhood of the Cruciform Sword, an organization that protects the Holy Grail. Throughout the 1990s Malikyan appeared in various television programs including the sitcom Birds of a Feather, and The Final Cut. In 2002, he featured alongside Steven Seagal in the American Action film, Belly of the Beast, but the film was not well received by the critics. Two years later Malikyan appeared in the 2004 remake of the 1965 film of the same name, Flight of the Phoenix in which he played Rady: the film received mixed reviews and performed poorly at the box-office. During his career, Malikyan has performed in a number of Shakespeare plays including Henry IV, Part 1 and Henry IV, Part 2 at the Shakespeare Globe Theatre in 2010. Malikyan also played in a number of roles in the Royal Shakespeare Company production, Arabian Nights (December 2009 – January 2010), at the Courtyard Theatre, Stratford-upon-Avon, Warwickshire. Malikyan appeared as Inspector Durmaz in the 2012 action-thriller film Taken 2, which was a sequel of the highly successful 2008 film.

Two years later Malikyan appeared in the epic biblical film Exodus: Gods and Kings in which he played Jethro. The film was based on the Book of Exodus and was directed by Ridley Scott. The same year he starred alongside Tahar Rahim and Simon Abkarian in the internationally co-produced drama film The Cut. In 2016, Malikyan featured in the historical drama The Promise which was set in the final years of the Ottoman Empire.

== Personal life ==
Malikyan married Maida Kupelian in Kensington, London in 1965. They have a daughter and a son, Sevan, an artist based in Cyprus. Malikyan also works as a teacher in Istanbul.

== Filmography ==
=== Film ===
Year	Title	Role	Notes
1970	The Man Who Haunted Himself	Luigi	
1977	The Assignment	Larringa's Murderer	Uncredited role
1978	Midnight Express	Prosecutor	
1981	Sphinx	Bell Boy	
1983	Trenchcoat	Arab	
1986	Half Moon Street	First Diplomat	
1988	Pascali's Island	Mardosian	
1989	Indiana Jones and the Last Crusade	Kazim	
1995	Paparazzo	Mackenzie	
1998	The Commissioner	Greek commissioner	
2002	Bella Bettien	Demetrio Altafini	
2003	Belly of the Beast	Fernand Zadir	Direct-to-DVD
2004	The Predator		Short film
2004	Flight of the Phoenix	Rady	
2006	Renaissance	Nusrat Farfella (voice)	
2011	The Palace	Sergeant Karem Akalin	Short film
2011	Open Mike	Shopkeeper	Short film
2012	Taken 2	Inspector Durmaz	
2013	Yozgat Blues	Sadettin Usta	
2013	Şarkı Söyleyen Kadınlar	Mesut	
2014	The Cut	Hagob Nakashian	
2014	Exodus: Gods and Kings	Jethro	
2015	Niyazi Gül Dörtnala	Süleyman	
2016	The Promise	Vartan Boghosian	
2017	Ay Lav Yu Tuu	Nedim	

=== Television ===
Year	Title	Role	Notes
1968	The Portrait of a Lady	Servant	Episode: "Dissensions"
1968	Virgin of the Secret Service	Corporal	Episode: "The Great Ring of Akba"
1968	Doctor Who	Kemel Rudkin	2 episodes: "The Wheel in Space: Episodes 2 & 3"
1968	Detective	Garcia	Episode: "The Murders in the Rue Morgue"
1968	The Saint	Hima Dri	Episode: "The People Importers". Uncredited role
1969	The Avengers	Rossi	Episode: "Homicide and Old Lace"
1972	Jason King	Kemal	Episode: "Uneasy Lies the Head"
1972	In for a Penny	Ali	6 episodes
1972	Adam Smith	Homi	Episode: #2.1
1972	New Scotland Yard	Joe Angelopoulos	Episode: "The Money Game"
1972	The Onedin Line	Hadji Ahmet’s Spokesman	Episode: "Beyond the Upper Sea"
1973	The Upper Crusts	Postman	Episode: "By Endeavour Alone"
1973	Little Big Time	Various roles	13 episodes
1973	Bowler	Marcus	Episode: "The Family Tree"
1974	Barlow	Amin	Episode: "Snatch"
1977	The Sunday Drama	Barman	Episode: "A Good Human Story"
1977	BBC2 Play of the Week	Nicholas	Episode: "The Kitchen"
1977	Who Pays the Ferryman?	Doctor	Mini-series, Episode 8: "The Daughters of Themis"
1977	The Onedin Line	Sonay	Episode: "Rescue"
1977–1979	Mind Your Language	Maximillian Papandrious	29 episodes
1978	Crown Court	Yannis Christodoulou	3 episodes: "Past Times: Parts 1–3"
1978	The Thief of Baghdad	Common Man	Television film
1978, 1979	The Professionals	Hanish (Mr. X) / Sniper	Series 2, Episode 9: "Blind Run" and Series 3, Episode 2: "Backtrack"
1979	Screenplay	Stavros	Episode: "The Sound of Guns"
1979	Minder	Chris	Series 1, Episode 6: "Aces High and Sometimes Very Low"
1981	Peter and Paul	Sapai	Television film
1982	Crown Court	Seth Lambert	Episode: "Window Shopping: Part 3"
1984	Auf Wiedersehen, Pet	Kemal	Series 1, Episode 11: "The Lovers"
1984	To Catch a King	Vodras	Television film
1984	Duty Free	Policeman	Episode: "Hasta La Vista"
1984	The First Olympics: Athens 1896	Mr. Persaki, US team host	Mini-series, 2 episodes
1984	Cold Warrior	Yussif	Episode: "The Man from Damascus"
1984	Scarecrow and Mrs. King	Ortiz	Episode: "The Times They Are a Changin'"
1985	The Corsican Brothers	Orlandi	Television film
1987	Boon	David Sulenkian	Episode: "A Fistful of Pesetas"
1990	House of Cards	Mr. Naresh	Mini-series, 4 episodes. Uncredited role
1991	Zorro	Picotin the Valet	2 episodes: "One for All: Parts 1 & 2"
1991, 1993	The Bill	Arcade Cashier / Kemal	2 episodes: "Discretion" and "Corroboration"
1992	Agatha Christie's Poirot	Amberiotis	Series 4, Episode 3: "One, Two, Buckle My Shoe"
1992	Van der Valk	Colombian	Episode: "The Ties That Bind"
1992	Press Gang	Fahid	Episode: "Day Dreams"
1992	Double Vision	Pasta Manager	Television film
1993	The Good Guys	Janosci	Episode: "Moldavian Rhapsody"
1993	The Young Indiana Jones Chronicles	Armenian Agent	Episode: "Istanbul, September 1918"
1994	Minder	Chico	Series 10, Episode 5: "The Immaculate Contraption"
1994	Wild Justice	Ali Hassan	Television film
1994	MacGyver: Lost Treasure of Atlantis	Zavros	Television film
1994	Birds of a Feather	Mr. Kouniakis	Episode: "Business is Business"
1995	The Detectives	Josef Esterhazy	Episode: "Art Attack"
1995	The Final Cut	Nures	Mini-series, 2 episodes
1995	Slave of Dreams	Vizier	Television film
1997	Into the Blue	Inspector Miltiades	Television film
2000	In the Beginning	Prison Governor	Mini-series, 2 episodes
2002	The American Embassy	Mullah	Episode: "Driven"
2002	Spooks	Ozan Cosar	Episode: "One Last Dance". Uncredited role
2002	Judge John Deed	Idries Shahatra	Episode: "Political Expediency"
2003	Casualty	Hussen	Episode: "Dire Straits"
2005	Egypt: Rediscovering a Lost World	Yanni Athenasiou	Mini-series, Episode: "The Temple of the Sands"
2007	Saddam's Tribe	Ali Hassan	Television film
2008	Silent Witness	Hasan Kundak	Series 12, 2 episodes: "Terror: Parts 1 & 2"
2008	10 Days to War	Massoud Barzani	Mini-series, Episode: "$100 Coffee"
2011–2012	Bir Ömür Yetmez		
2012	Babalar ve Evlatlar		4 episodes
2013	Strike Back	Al-Zuhari	Series 4, 2 episodes: "Shadow Warfare: Parts 2 & 5"
2014	Reaksyon	Öktem Çetiner	12 episodes
2017	Silent Witness	Varkey Khoury	Series 20, 2 episodes: "Identity: Parts 1 & 2"
2017–2018	The Last Emperor: Abdul Hamid II	Alexandr Israil Parvus	AKA Payitaht: Abdülhamid (original title). 50 episodes
2018	Kanaga	Enki Tamay	Mini-series, 8 episodes
2020	Homeland	Agha Jan	Episode: "Deception Indicated"
2021	Baptiste	Mehmet Arslan	Series 2, 3 episodes
2023	The Turkish Detective	Erol Karagul	2 episodes
2024	Vikings: Valhalla	Mehmet	Episode: "Honour and Dishonour"
