= Terry Frost =

English artist (1915–2003)

- Born: Terence Ernest Manitou Frost; 13 October 1915; Leamington Spa, Warwickshire, England
- Died: 1 September 2003 (aged 87); Newlyn, Cornwall, England
- Education: Birmingham College of Art; Camberwell School of Art; St. Ives School of Painting
- Movement: St Ives School

Sir Terence Ernest Manitou Frost RA (13 October 1915 – 1 September 2003) was a British abstract artist, who worked in Newlyn, Cornwall. Frost was renowned for his use of the Cornish light, colour and shape to start a new art movement in England. He became a leading exponent of abstract art and a recognised figure of the British art establishment.

== Career ==
Born in Leamington Spa, Warwickshire, in 1915, he did not become an artist until he was in his 30s. He left school aged fourteen and went to work at Curry's cycle shop and then at Armstrong Whitworth in Coventry. During World War II, he served in France, the Middle East and Greece, before joining the commandos. Whilst serving with the commandos in Crete in June 1941 he was captured and sent to various prisoner of war camps. As a prisoner of war at Stalag 383 in Bavaria, he met Adrian Heath who encouraged him to paint. Commenting later he described these years as a 'tremendous spiritual experience, a more aware or heightened perception during starvation'.

As soon as war was over he went to Birmingham College of Art, where he met Barrie Cook. However Frost quickly assumed that the action was elsewhere. At first attended Camberwell School of Art under Leonard Fuller. The following year, 1946 he removed for a year out to St. Ives School of Painting where his first solo exhibition was held in 1947 at G.B. Downing's bookshop, before returning to London and that autumn the Camberwell School of Art under Victor Pasmore, Ben Nicholson and William Coldstream bringing him to paint his first abstract work in 1949. For three years he exhibited with the St Ives Society of Artists until in 1950 he was elected a member of the Penwith Society; he maintained a permanent connection with the Newlyn school. Already settled in the town by 1951 he worked as an assistant to the sculptor Barbara Hepworth. He was joined there by Roger Hilton, where they began a collaboration in collage and construction techniques.

His first exhibition was the Leicester Galleries in the heart of London's West End. Frost's academic career included teaching at Bath Academy of Art, the Coventry College of Art and was appointed on the recommendation of Herbert Read as the Gregory Fellow on Painting (1954-1956) at the University of Leeds. There he befriended the painter Stass Paraskos, who would later invite Frost to spend time working and teaching in Cyprus at the Cyprus College of Art.

In 1958 while still living in Leeds and teaching at Leeds School of Art he joined the London Group. He moved to St Ives, and then in 1963 to Banbury, where his house at 2 Old Parr Street now sports an Oxfordshire Blue Plaque.

Later he became Artist in Residence and Professor of Painting at the Department of Fine Art of the University of Reading.

In the 1960s, Frost was represented by the Bertha Schaefer Gallery in New York.

In 1992 he was elected a Royal Academician and he was knighted in 1998. A retrospective of his work was held in 2000.

== Personal life ==
He married Kathleen Clarke in 1945. They had five sons and one daughter. Two of his sons, Adrian and Anthony, also became artists, while a third son, Stephen, is a comedian and actor. His grandson Luke Frost (son of Anthony) is also an artist.

== Selected works ==
The following list is not comprehensive but includes paintings, screenprints, sikcreens, etchings, aquatints, woodcuts and collages.

- Movement: Green, Black and White (1951-2) Scottish National Gallery of Modern Art
- Blue Moon (1952)
- Double Quay (1952)
- Boat shapes (1954)
- Khaki and Lemon (1956)
- Red and Black linear (1967-8)
- Lace I (Trial proof) (1968)
- Red and Black Solid (1968)
- Red and Black on Green (1968)
- Red and Black on Blue (1968)
- Red and Black on Purple (1969)
- Ochre, Red, Blue (1969)
- Red, Blue, Orange on Yellow (1969)
- Blues (1969)
- Orange Dusk (1970)
- Stacked on Side (1970)
- Red and Black on the Side (1970)
- Moonship (1972)
- Red, Blue, Green (1972)
- Ice Blue (1972)
- Alhambra (1972)
- Blue, Brown, Black (1981) The Country House Gallery, Burnley
- Blue, Brown, Black (1981) Ian Starr, Manchester
- Suspended Forms Red Yellow & Blue (1986)
- Variations (1989)
- The Old Lizard (1989)
- Pause of the Clock (1989)
- Colour on the Side (1989)
- Moon Rising (1989)
- The Spinster at Mass (1989)
- Tree, Tree (1989)
- Lorca Sun (1991)
- Newlyn Rhythm (1995)
- Spring Spiral screen print, Flowers Editions
- Arizona (1996) Flowers Editions, London
- Spring Spiral (1996)
- Black Mon and Ochre (1997) The Country House Gallery, Burnley
- Canadian Pacific Blue (1997)
- Canadian Pacific Yellow (1997)
- Black Orchard (1997) Flowers Editions
- Colour Rhythm Newlyn (1997)
- Madron Blue Suite I (1997)
- Madron Blue Suite II (1997)
- Madron Blue Suite III (1997)
- Sundrops lithograph (1997)
- Swing Red Newlyn (1998)
- Timberaine A woodcut (2000)
- Camberwell Green (2001)
- Small Yellow Timberain (2001)
- Sunbow (2002) Askew Art, Henley-on-Thames
- 3 Stripes for Red (2002) AE Art, Warwick.
- Black Circle (2002)
- Blue Brad AE Art
- Long Red Yellow and Black (2002)
- Blue, Black, Red and Vertical Rhythm (2002) The Country House Gallery
- A Rare Portfolio - SS (April 2003) AE Art, Warwick
- Blue Love Tree (2003)
- Laced Sun from SS set (2003)
- Slumber Black (2003)
- Sun Tree silk screen (2003)
- Three Graces etching, (2003)
- Vertical Lines screenprint (2003)
- Two Models etching (2003)
- Lizard Black II (2003)
- Carlyon Sunshine silk screen print (2003)
- Sun and Boats (2003)

== See also ==
- List of St. Ives artists
