= Evelyn Silber =

English art historian

Evelyn Ann Silber (born 22 May 1949) is an English art historian and an acknowledged specialist on 20th century British sculpture. She is an honorary Professorial Research Fellow at the University of Glasgow and is researching the marketing of modernist art in early 20th century London and the role played by dealers. Having moved to Glasgow in 2001 to assume the role of Director of the Hunterian Museum and Art Gallery, Silber continues to be based there and is an advocate for Glasgow's cultural heritage, the conservation of the city, and its tourist industry. She is currently the Chair of the Scottish Archaeological Finds Allocation Panel.

== Early life and education ==
Born in England in 1949 to Martin Helmut Silber and Mavis Evelyn (née Giles), Silber was educated at Hatfield Girls’ Grammar School before going up to New Hall, Cambridge to read for a degree. She went onto obtain an MA in the History of Art from the University of Pennsylvania following which, she studied for her Ph.D. in art history at Clare Hall, Cambridge between 1975 and 1982. During this time she was a Leverhulme Research Fellow undertaking research for her doctoral thesis into the origins of the illuminations of the medieval manuscripts Speculum Humanae Salvationis and published a paper ‘The Reconstructed Toledo Speculum Humanae Salvationis: The Italian Connection in the Early Fourteenth Century’ in the Journal of the Warburg and Courtauld Institutes in 1980.

== Career ==
Even before taking up her first full time post as an assistant keeper and curator at Birmingham Museum and Art Gallery in 1979, Silber, while still at school, became a guide at Hatfield House and worked during her university study years in publishing and as a lecturer at Glasgow University. Silber remained in Birmingham for some fifteen years eventually becoming Head of Central Museums in 1994. During her time in the Midlands, Silber catalogued the sculpture of Jacob Epstein and the sculpture in Birmingham Museum and Art Gallery.

In 1995, Silber became Director of Leeds Museums and Gallery, where she was responsible for 7 sites, all of whom benefitted from Lottery funding during her six-year tenure. Her advocacy and concerns regarding stored collections led to the creation of the Leeds Discovery Centre that was opened in 2007; a purpose-built storage facility, to house the collections and artefacts not on display, that was funded by Leeds City Council and the National Lottery Heritage Fund. Silber's last museum post, before becoming a research fellow and freelance lecturer, was as Director of the Hunterian Museum and Art Gallery in Glasgow University; a role she assumed in October 2001 and retired from in 2006.

Silber's lecture work, as an accredited lecturer of The Arts Society, and for the National Association of Decorative and Fine Art Societies, has taken her as far afield as Australia and New Zealand where she undertook a lecture tour in 2014. Amongst other things she lectures on museology and 20th century modernist sculpture especially on Jacob Epstein, as a renowned expert on his work. She co-curated an important exhibition on Jacob Epstein, with Terry Friedman, that opened on 16 April 1987 at the Leeds City Art Galleries, before going on to the Whitechapel Gallery in London, from 3 July to 13 September 1987. Silber was also a contributor to a television documentary entitled Jacob Epstein - Rebel Angel in 1987, acted as an advisor on the selection of works for a 2015 exhibition Sir Jacob Epstein Babies and Bloomsbury at The Foundling Museum and wrote the entry on Sir Jacob Epstein for the Oxford Dictionary of National Biography.

Silber also leads cultural tours around Glasgow.

== Public work ==
Silber is currently Chair of the Scottish Archaeological Finds Allocation Panel (SAFAP), 'an independent panel of heritage experts and lay members responsible for advising the Queen's and Lord Treasurer's Remembrancer to which museum an object should be allocated and on the level of ex gratia award for the finder', for example, the allocation of the Galloway Hoard which, reportedly, caused some controversy, when it was given to the National Museum of Scotland. The value of the treasure to the nation was acknowledged by Dr Evelyn Silber, in her capacity as Chair of SAFAP, to the BBC in a news report dated 12 May 2017;

"The panel is grateful to the finder for reporting these stunning artefacts which include decorative glass beads, silver bracelets and brooches, a gold ring, a bird-shaped gold pin and a highly-decorated gilt vessel recognised as being one of only three known examples. These will now be preserved and put on display for the people of Scotland, and the world, to enjoy. The mysterious circumstances of their deposition and unique quality will attract researchers and enthusiasts alike."

Silber took up the position with SAFAP in January 2012 after retiring as Chair of the Charles Rennie Mackintosh Society, a post she had held for 6 years. She was a member of the Historic Environment Advisory Council for Scotland from 2006 to 2009 and is also involved in many conservation issues around Glasgow. For example, she was Chair of the Victoria Forum that was formed so that local people could have their say on the future of the Victoria Infirmary site and Chair of the Queens Park Arena; a project, as Silber explained in a quote for Glasgow Live, to regenerate the fire damaged and derelict site into a “community-led venue attracting a wide variety of performance from music and dance to food and sports activities”.

Silber was on the advisory board of the Ben Uri Gallery and Museum in London and contributed a chapter ‘Three Portraits and a Friendship: Wolmark and Gaudier-Brzeska’ in Rediscovering Wolmark: A Pioneer of British Modernism; an exhibition catalogue published by the gallery in 2004. However, she and ten other members of the International Advisory Panel of the Ben Uri Gallery, which included Sir Nicholas Serota, Griselda Pollock and Norman Rosenthal, resigned in 2018 in protest over the gallery's decision to sell some of its important artworks including paintings by David Bomberg and Mark Gertler. A controversy reported by the Museums Association, of which Silber is a Fellow (FMA), that condemned the actions of the gallery.

== Other ==
Photographs attributed to Silber are held in the Conway Library at The Courtauld Institute of Art whose archive, primarily of architectural images, is being digitised under the wider Courtauld Connects programme.

== Selected publications ==
- The Sculpture of Epstein: with a complete catalogue, Oxford: Phaidon Press, 1986, ISBN 0838751032
- Sculpture in Birmingham Museum and Art Gallery: A Summary Catalogue, Birmingham: City Museum and Art Gallery, 1987, ISBN 9780709301394
- Jacob Epstein: Sculpture and Drawings, Evelyn Silber & Terry F. Friedman, Leeds: Henry Moore Centre for the Study of Sculpture, 1989, ISBN 0901286214
- Gaudier-Brzeska: Life and Art, With a Catalogue Raisonne of the Sculpture, with photographs by David Finn, London: Thames & Hudson, 1996, ISBN 9780500092613
- Savage Messiah – A Biography of the Sculptor Henri Gaudier-Brzeska, H. S. Ede with contributions by Evelyn Silber, Sebastiano Barassi and Jon Wood, Henry Moore Institute & Kettle's Yard, 2011, ISBN 9781905462346
