= Luke Frost =

English painter

Luke Frost is a British abstract painter living in Cornwall, and is the son of the English painter Anthony Frost and the grandson of Sir Terry Frost.

His work featured in the "Art Now Cornwall" exhibition, at Tate St Ives, 2007, and he was Artist in Residence at Tate St Ives in 2008 following with a solo show from 24 January to 4 May 2009 .

== See also ==
- List of St. Ives artists
- Anthony Frost
- Terry Frost
