= Sevan Malikyan =

British artist (born 1972)

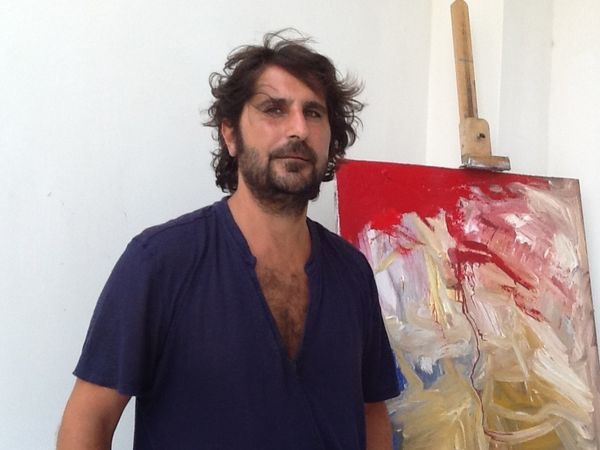
- Born: Sevan Mardig Malikyan; 4 September 1972 (age 53); St Pancras, London, England
- Education: Bath School of Art and Design; Cyprus College of Art
- Father: Kevork Malikyan

Sevan Mardig Malikyan (Armenian: Սևան Մալիկյան; born 4 September 1972) is a British expressive artist of Armenian ancestry.

== Career ==
Malikyan was born in 1972 in St Pancras, London. Sevan's father, Kevork Malikyan (born 1943) is an Anglo-Armenian actor from Diyarbakır, Turkey who had moved to the UK in 1963 to study at Rose Bruford Drama School. Malikyan's mother Maida (born in 1947), from Nicosia, Cyprus, arrived in the UK in 1959 and worked as a hair stylist in London where they met.

A studio based painter, Malikyan is considered one of the young outstanding artists of his generation with many exhibitions. Sevan got his Art education in London, he gained a BA (Hons) in Fine Art from the Bath School of Art and Design. Later he studied at the Cyprus College of Art, completing his postgraduate Diploma in Fine Art in 2009 and a post 16 Adult teaching diploma. Since 2010 Malikyan has been an adult education painting tutor at Cornaro Art Institute.

== Exhibitions ==
- Riverside Studios, Brick Lane Gallery and Mall Galleries, London (shortlisted for the Diana Brooks Prize)
- Fine Art Company Inc London, Group Show Selected Works, 2005
- Brick Lane Gallery London, Group Show Figurative paintings, 2006
- Fine Art Company Inc London, Group Show Selected Works, 2007
- Aspelia Gallery, Larnaka, 2008
- “Painting within”, Kypriaki Gonia Gallery, Larnaka, 2011
- Passage Through Abstraction, Gloria Gallery, Nicosia, 2014
- Cornaro Art Institute, New paintings, Larnaka, 2016

== See also ==
- List of Armenian artists
- Armenians in the UK
