= Margaret Paraskos =

English-born artist

- Born: 1959 (age 66–67); Leeds, West Yorkshire, West Riding of Yorkshire, England
- Education: University of Brighton; University of Northampton
- Known for: Painting

Margaret Frances Paraskos (born 1959) is an English-born artist of Cypriot descent and a resident in Cyprus. She is the daughter of the Cypriot artist Stass Paraskos and succeeded him as the director of the Cyprus College of Art.

== Biography ==
Margaret Paraskos was born in Leeds, daughter of the Cypriot artist Stass Paraskos. She attended Chartham County Secondary Modern School in Kent, England, and went on to study Fine Art at the University of Brighton. She later studied for a master's degree in Fine Art at the University of Northampton.

She has been employed in teaching art at a number of institutions, mainly in Cyprus, and has run the Lempa campus of the Cyprus College of Art since 1985. With the death of Stass Paraskos in 2014 she became the director of the Cyprus College of Art.

As well as having work in collections in Cyprus, she is included in the painting collection of the Stanley & Audrey Burton Gallery at the University of Leeds in England.

== Artistic style ==
Margaret Paraskos is predominantly a painter. According to the Greek newspaper Kathimerini her work is 'inspired by philosophy, mythology, the poetry of Homer and Ovid and the bucolic life'. These elements lead to brightly coloured painted canvases that are 'characterised by free flowing gestures.'

Her works have been exhibited in Cyprus, Britain and other countries. This includes the exhibition 'Travellers to an Antique Land', held in Paphos in Cyprus in March 2015, which took its theme from the poem by Percy Bysshe Shelley, Ozymandias. In an interview on the exhibition Paraskos said, 'The poem, and thus the exhibition, share the idea of the mystery of visiting an ancient culture for the first time.'

This poetic approach to painting was noted by Dr. Nadia Anaxagorou, writing on Margaret Paraskos's work in 2012, who stated: 'In a painterly universe, where the rules of order, proportion and gravity are eliminated... one figure emerges from each other in passages where reality and logic meet dreams and the imagination'. A strong desire to use art to convey emotions through the use of colour and shape is also evident in Paraskos's claim that, 'Through rich colors, abstract shapes and personal symbols' she is seeking to express 'strong emotions' with her work.
