= Sculpture Journal =

- Discipline: Sculpture
- Language: English
- Edited by: Elisa Foster, Teresa Kittler, Eckart Marchand, Emma Payne

Publication details
- History: 1997–present
- Publisher: Liverpool University Press
- Frequency: Triannually

Standard abbreviations
- ISO 4: Sculpt. J.

Indexing
- ISSN: 1366-2724 (print); 1756-9923 (web)
- LCCN: sn98050116
- OCLC no.: 809603636

Links
- Journal homepage; Online access

The Sculpture Journal is a triannual peer-reviewed academic journal of sculpture published by Liverpool University Press. It was established in 1997 by the Public Monuments and Sculpture Association (PMSA), with Marjorie Trusted as founding editor. When the PMSA was wound up in 2020, the journal was sold to Liverpool University Press. The current editors-in-chief are Elisa Foster, Teresa Kittler, Eckart Marchand and Emma Payne.

== Abstracting and indexing ==
The journal is abstracted and indexed in the Arts and Humanities Citation Index, Current Contents/Arts & Humanities, EBSCO databases, ProQuest databases, and Scopus.
