= Lempa, Cyprus =

Lempa
- Λέμπα (Greek) Lemba (Turkish)
- Location within Cyprus
- Coordinates: 34°48′47″N 32°24′20″E
- Country: Cyprus
- District: Paphos District
- Time zone: UTC+2 (EET)
  - Summer (DST): UTC+3 (EEST)

Lempa (Greek: Λέμπα, Turkish: Lemba) is a village in Cyprus located approximately 4 km (2.5 mi) north of the town of Paphos. It is sometimes written as Lemba, which is also closer to the correct pronunciation. Neighbouring villages are Empa, Kissonerga and Chloraka.

The village is located on top of an escarpment overlooking the Mediterranean Sea, and is in one of the most fertile parts of Cyprus. The area produces citrus, olives, tomatoes and market-garden vegetables, and is one of the few parts of Europe where commercial banana production is possible.

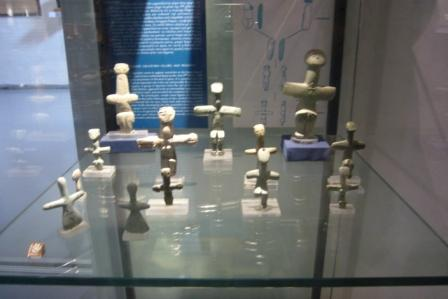
Chalcolithic cruciform figurines found in Lempa. These are made from picrolite and on display in Gallery 1 of the Cyprus Museum.

The village is one of the most ancient in Cyprus, and since 1976 has been the site of ongoing archaeological excavations by the School of Archaeology at the University of Edinburgh. Lempa is believed to have been first settled in the Chalcolithic period (c. 3800 – c. 2500 BC), and a number of cruciform female figurines, carved in stone, from this period have been found. In 1982, the Lemba Experimental Village was established as an archaeological project to recreate a Chalcolithic village and use it to undertake a number of historic activities, including use of building materials, pyrotechnology, pottery firing and prehistoric cooking methods. With the cooperation of the Cyprus Department of Antiquities, as well as the mayor and villagers of Lempa, the project has developed into an important visitor attraction as well as being for research into many aspects of experimental archaeology.

Lempa appears to have been occupied for most of the human history of Cyprus, and much later archaeological remains, including pottery fragments and coins from the Mediaeval period have been found there.

In 1958, after the intercommunal fights, the majority of Lempa villagers had to flee to Afania. And in 1959 the Lempa villagers returned their houses right before the British Colonial Government agreed to establish the Republic of Cyprus.

Until 1963 Lempa was a Turkish village, but following intercommunal violence on 2 January 1964 the Turkish population abandoned Lempa and settled in Paphos. Following the Turkish invasion of Cyprus in 1974, the Turkish population moved to the north of Cyprus, primarily Morphou, North Nicosia, Famagusta and Kyrenia and the village was fully abandoned except for a small number of Greek refugees. It was then resettled by displaced Greek Cypriots from the north.

In 1981, Lempa became home to the Cyprus College of Art. Under the leadership of the Cypriot artist Stass Paraskos, the college renovated the former school building for use as artists' studios. The first artist to use the building was the British painter Euan Uglow. Following the college a number of other artists moved into the village which has since become an internationally known art colony.

In 2008, as a consequence of the artists, archaeologists and art college in Lempa the Government of Cyprus announced that the village would receive major funding to become a 'cultural village'. This project would see improvements to the facilities of both the archaeological site and college, and new facilities for visitors to Lempa. However this proved controversial as it took the Cypriot government fifteen years to start work on the development and since its completion the Government of Cyprus has decided that Stass Paraskos's Cyprus College of Art is no longer to be allowed to use the site.
