= Cyprus College of Art =

- Abbreviation: CyCA
- Formation: 1969
- Type: Arts Centre
- Headquarters: 6 Stass Paraskos Street, Lempa, 8260 Paphos, Cyprus
- Location: Paphos, Cyprus
- Coordinates: 34°48′36.88″N 32°24′35.61″E
- Director: Margaret Paraskos
- Founder: Stass Paraskos
- Website: www.cypruscollegeofart.com

The Cyprus College of Art (CyCA) is an artists' studio group, formerly located in the village of Lempa on the west coast of Cyprus. It was founded in 1969 by the artist Stass Paraskos; the current director is the Cyprus-based artist Margaret Paraskos.

== History ==
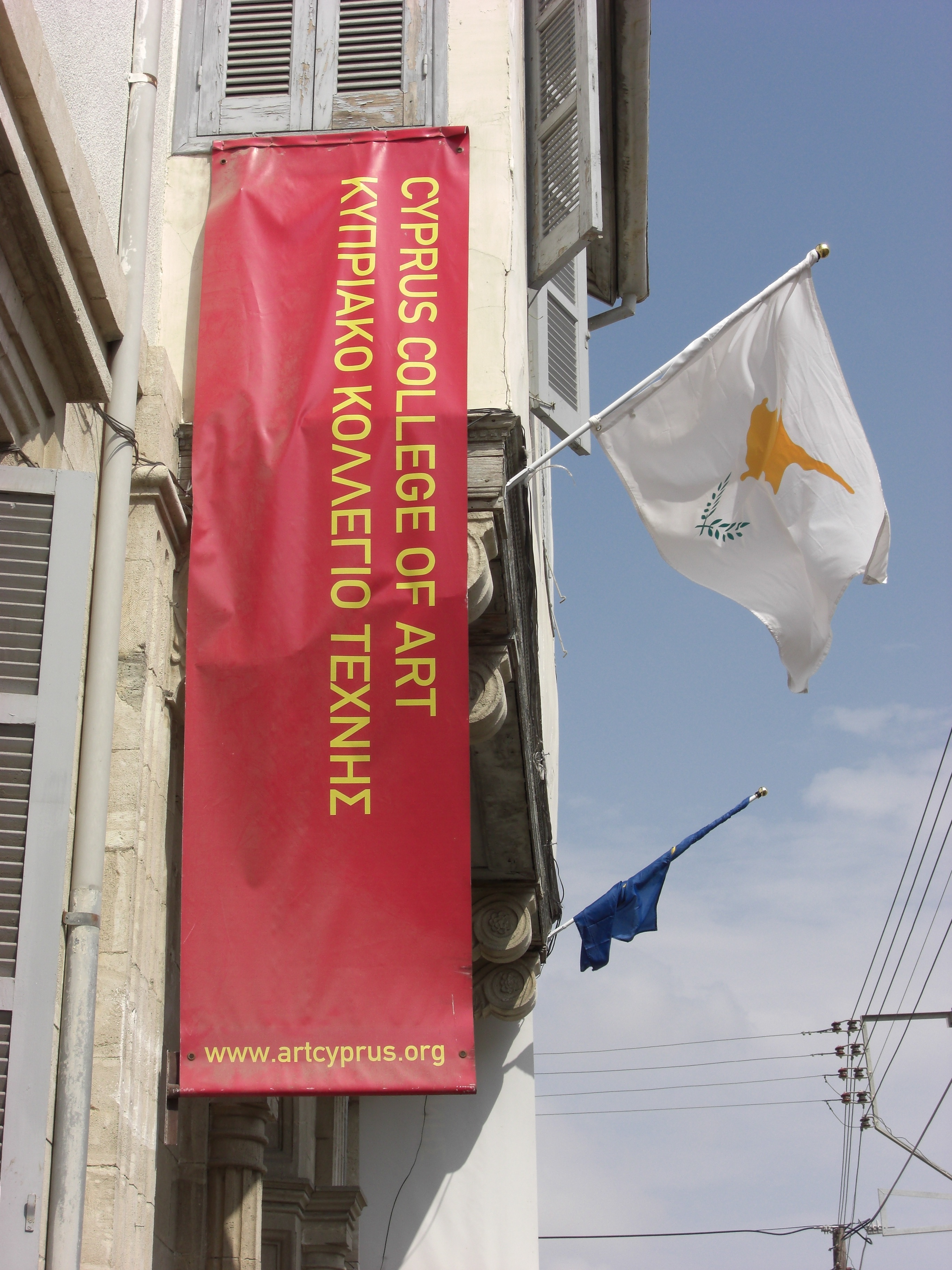
The former Cyprus College of Art building in the centre of Larnaca.

The Cyprus College of Art was founded in 1969 by the Cypriot painter Stass Paraskos, and is one of the oldest art institutions on the Mediterranean island of Cyprus. In the past it has been housed at different locations. It started life in the city of Famagusta on the east coast of Cyprus in 1969, but after a campaign by local hoteliers against the presence of impoverished artists and art students in a city increasingly focused on mass tourism, the College moved briefly to Larnaca in 1972, and then to Kato Paphos in 1973. With the arrival of the mass-tourism industry to Kato Paphos in the early 1980s, the local authorities there also asked the College to move and it was settled at its present site in the village of Lempa in 1985. In 2002 the College acquired premises in the city of Limassol, run alongside the studios in Lempa, and the Limassol operation moved to Larnaca in 2007, becoming the Cornaro Institute. This was separated from the Cyprus College of Art in 2014, and now operates as an independent organisation.

The original aim of the Cyprus College of Art was not to provide formal courses, but to offer artists and art students from different countries the opportunity to spend a period of time making art in Cyprus. However, in the early 1970s the college planned to launch the first postgraduate fine art programme in Cyprus, but this was delayed by the Turkish invasion in 1974, and did not start until 1978. With the establishment of this programme, the Cyprus College of Art became the first true art school offering in higher education programmes, on the island of Cyprus.

In 1985 Stass Paraskos was joined by his daughter, Margaret Paraskos, running the College. With the acquisition of additional premises in Limassol in 2002 the College launched several undergraduate fine art programmes. This included foundation, adult education and degree courses in painting, sculpture, photography and printmaking. Almost all of the programmes taught at the College followed a British art education model, and several were validated in the United Kingdom, although these validations were not accepted by the Cypriot government authorities. In 2007 the College's Limassol site was closed, and teaching transferred to a new building in Larnaca which became known as the Cornaro Institute, named after the last Venetian Queen of Cyprus Caterina Cornaro. From this time the site at Lempa concentrated on postgraduate programmes, and that at Larnaca on foundation and undergraduate programmes. Both sites were also used to house visiting artists from around the world.

Following the death of Stass Paraskos in 2014, the Cyprus College of Art ceased to offer formal educational courses and de-registered as a college of education with the Cyprus Ministry of Education and Culture. The Cornaro Institute in Larnaca was separated from the College and became an independent institution, and the College in Lempa became a studio and residency centre for artists and art students from around the world.

== Foundation and ethos ==
The foundation of the College in 1969 was highly unusual. Although Stass Paraskos had visited Cyprus in 1968 with the British poet Martin Bell, and met with the first President of Cyprus, Archbishop Makarios, to discuss opening an art school in Cyprus, the initial impetus for starting the Cyprus College of Art came from an informal discussion in a pub in the English city of Leeds, where Paraskos was a tutor at the Leeds College of Art. In this discussion it was suggested Paraskos organise a summer trip for the art students and tutors to Cyprus. Agreeing to do this, Paraskos started an annual event, which attracted students from other British art schools, and eventually grew into the Cyprus College of Art. This informal start led by artists remains a central part of the ethos of CyCA today, with artists rather than administrators still playing a central role in the institution, and stressing the freedom of the artist to be a creative being rather than under the control of academic bureaucracies.

== Sculpture wall and garden ==
The Cyprus College of Art's former campus in Lempa was surrounded by a large sculpture wall and garden, open to the public. This was created over a period of over twenty-five years from 1989 by Stass Paraskos, together with many of the artists and art students who have visited the College. The wall was a major landmark and tourist attraction in the region, attracting visitors to the village to see sculptures of a King Kong-sized gorilla, a donkey known as 'the art critic' and numerous other animals and human figures, as well as abstract elements. These were all constructed from found materials and cement.

== Controversy with Manifesta ==
In 2005, the International Manifesta Organisation, based in the Netherlands announced that the art festival Manifesta 6 would be held in Cyprus in 2006. The Cyprus College of Art was initially enthusiastic about the prospect of an international art fair in Cyprus, publishing a supporting article in the College newsletter, ArtCyprus about Manifesta.

However a perceived unwillingness by the Manifesta organisers to engage with the College and the Cypriot art world resulted in the College becoming one of Manifesta 6's fiercest critics. This was compounded by the Manifesta team claiming there was no functioning art school in Cyprus, a charge that resulted in CyCA dedicating an entire issue of ArtCyprus to attacking Manifesta, accusing the Dutch organisation of cultural insensitivity bordering on racism.

== Rebirth and development ==
The economic crisis that hit Cyprus in 2013 had a major detrimental effect on the finances of the College, resulting in falling student recruitment. Coupled with the death of the founder of the College, Stass Paraskos, in 2014, it was decided in 2014 to cease offering educational courses and return the College to being a centre for visiting artists. This resulted in the separation of the Cyprus College of Art in Lempa from the Cornaro Institute in Larnaca, and with the focus of the College being firmly on Lempa, where work was undertaken to upgrade the facilities in Lempa to operate the site solely as an artists' studio complex. This was curtailed when, upon completion of the upgrade works, the Cyprus Deputy Ministry of Culture evicted the Cyprus College of Art from Lempa.

== Published histories ==
- David Haste et al. Stass Paraskos (London: Orage Press, 2010) ISBN 978-0-9544523-5-3
- John Cornall 'Earth Wisdom – Cypriot Connections in British Art' in London Magazine 1996

== Tutors, visiting artists and alumni ==
- Stephen Bird
- Sir Anthony Caro
- Dennis Creffield
- Jennifer Durrant, RA
- Professor Peter de Francia
- Anthony Frost
- Sir Terry Frost
- Clive Head
- Michael Kidner, RA
- Professor Norbert Lynton
- Sevan Malikyan
- Mali Morris, RA
- Margaret Paraskos
- Stass Paraskos, Founder
- Ben Read, FSA
- Arshak Sarkissian
- Euan Uglow
- Steve Whitehead
- Rachel Whiteread, CBE
