= Public Monuments and Sculpture Association =

Organisation promoting the study of British public sculptures and monuments

The Public Monuments and Sculpture Association (PMSA) was an organisation established in 1991 to bring together individuals and organisations with an interest in British public sculptures and monuments, their production, preservation and history. It was wound up in the summer of 2020, although members dissatisfied with this decision established a successor organisation with similar objectives, the Public Statues and Sculpture Association, in the autumn of the same year.

== Status and governance ==
The association was a charitable company which was run by a board comprising its Director and the Trustees, known as the General Committee. Ad hoc sub-committees organised events, projects or campaigns.

The President of the PMSA was the Duke of Gloucester and the chairman was Sir John Lewis. It was based at 70 Cowcross Street, London.

== Activities ==
The primary aim of the PMSA was to heighten public awareness of Britain's monumental heritage—past, present, and future—through activities, publications and dialogue. It campaigned for the listing, preservation, protection and restoration of public monuments and sculpture, covering a period from the Stuart monarchy to the present day. As well as campaigning for historic monuments and public sculpture, it was active in promoting the commissioning of new public monuments and sculpture.

The founding members were Jo Darke, with the writer, lecturer and broadcaster Paul Atterbury, Ian Leith of the National Monuments Record, and Catherine Moriarty, then Co-ordinator of the National Inventory of War Memorials.

From the beginning, the association was actively encouraged by the writer and sculpture scholar Benedict Read, and by Andrew and Janet Naylor, metal sculpture conservators. Subscriptions were opened in May 1991 and membership stabilised at around 250. From 1991, the PMSA initiated the National Recording Project and collaborated with the publishers Liverpool University Press on the series Public Sculpture of Britain, and established the bi-annual Sculpture Journal. It set up events, conferences and publications in collaboration with English Heritage, the UK Institute of Conservators, University College Dublin and other institutions. It operated an advisory service and distributed newsletters and newssheets to its members.

Later projects included collaboration with other organisations and individuals to oversee production of the Custodians Handbook, published in 2005 and occasionally updated. This was designed to give guidance to families and individuals who inherit sculptors' works, studios, archives and memorabilia; and the campaign Save our Sculpture (SoS) was set up to encourage concerned members of the public to keep watch over their neighbourhood sculptures, and to report damage or negligence to the PMSA. Another project was creating a digital database of public sculptures and monuments.

== Dissolution and successor ==
In July 2020, the PMSA's chairman, Sir John Lewis, wrote to members to inform them that the decision had been taken to wind up the association, partly for financial reasons, and partly on the grounds that "the handing over of catalogue data to Art UK in 2018 effectively brought the PMSA's twenty-year National Recording Project to a successful conclusion". The Sculpture Journal was sold to Liverpool University Press, and other assets transferred to the Royal Society of Sculptors.

Members challenged this decision, but without success. Instead, a new organisation, the Public Statues and Sculpture Association (PSSA), was founded in the autumn of 2020 as "the natural successor" to the PMSA, "on similar principles", to "advance the understanding and appreciation of sculpture", and again with the Duke of Gloucester as President. Among other activities, the PSSA aims to continue and complete the published county-by-county survey of UK public sculpture begun by the PMSA.
