= Stass Paraskos =

British-Cypriot artist (1933–2014)

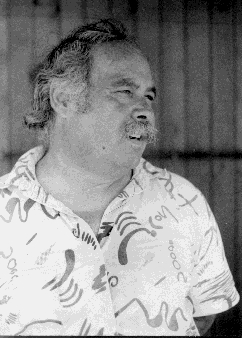
- Born: Stasinos Paraskos; 17 March 1933; Anaphotia, British Cyprus
- Died: 4 March 2014 (aged 80); Paphos, Cyprus
- Occupations: Painter, sculptor, writer, teacher
- Years active: 1958–2014
- Children: 5, including Margaret Paraskos

Stass Paraskos (Greek: Στας Παράσκος; 17 March 1933 – 4 March 2014) was a British-Cypriot artist, teacher and writer. Born in Cyprus, he moved to Britain in 1953 and studied at Leeds College of Art. He became known in Britain after his 1966 exhibition Lovers and Romances led to an obscenity prosecution under the Vagrancy Act 1838. He later taught at art schools in Britain and Cyprus, and founded the institution that became the Cyprus College of Art, where he served as principal.

== Early life and education ==
Paraskos was born in Anaphotia, Cyprus, on 17 March 1933. In 1953 he moved to England, where he initially worked in London and Leeds before enrolling at Leeds College of Art, later Leeds Arts University.

At Leeds he studied under Harry Thubron and became associated with artists including Terry Frost, Wilhelmina Barns-Graham and Dennis Creffield. He later spent time in St Ives, Cornwall, where he shared a studio with Barns-Graham before returning to Leeds.

In 1957 he married Winifred Mary Pepper. They had five children, including the artist Margaret Paraskos.

== Obscenity trial ==
In 1966, Paraskos exhibited a group of paintings titled Lovers and Romances at the Leeds Institute Gallery. Following a complaint from a member of the public, police raided the exhibition and Paraskos was prosecuted for displaying works alleged to be obscene under the Vagrancy Act 1838.

The case attracted support from figures in the British art world, including Herbert Read, Quentin Bell and Norbert Lynton, but Paraskos was convicted and fined. The 1966 exhibition and trial were revisited in the 2016 exhibition Stass Paraskos: Lovers and Romances at The Tetley in Leeds.

Following the trial, Paraskos was included in the 1967 group exhibition Fantasy and Figuration at the Institute of Contemporary Arts in London.

== Teaching career and Cyprus College of Art ==
Paraskos taught at Leeds College of Art, Leicester College of Art, later part of De Montfort University, and Canterbury College of Art, which later became part of the Kent Institute of Art & Design and the University for the Creative Arts. At Canterbury he became Senior Lecturer in Fine Art and later Head of Painting.

In 1969, Paraskos founded a summer school for British art students in Famagusta. After the events of 1974, the school relocated first to Kato Paphos and later to Lempa, near Paphos. There it developed into the Cyprus College of Art, with Paraskos as its principal. The college attracted students and artists from Cyprus, Britain and elsewhere. After retiring from Canterbury, he returned to Cyprus in 1989 and continued to work with the college.

In 2008, Paraskos was awarded an honorary doctorate by the University of Bolton for his contribution to art.

== Style and work ==
Paraskos's painting is usually figurative but non-naturalistic, with strong colour and imagery often rooted in Cypriot village life, mythology and history. The Ben Uri Research Unit describes his work as combining elements of Cypriot folk art and Byzantine church art with influences from modern artists including Paul Gauguin and Henri Matisse.

His works are held in a number of public collections. Art UK lists works by Paraskos in British public collections, including Leeds Museums and Galleries and the University of Leeds Art Collection. The Ben Uri Research Unit also lists works by Paraskos in the Tate, the Arts Council Collection and other collections.

In addition to painting, Paraskos made sculpture and assemblage works. In the 1990s he began work on a large sculpture wall at Lempa, near the studios of the Cyprus College of Art.

== Writing ==
Paraskos wrote on Cypriot culture, mythology and art, in Greek and English. His books included Cyprus of Copper and Aphrodite: The Mythology of Cyprus. The Mythology of Cyprus was later published in Greek and Turkish translations.

== Death and legacy ==
Paraskos died at his home in Paphos, Cyprus, on 4 March 2014. Following his death, the Cyprus Ministry of Education announced that his funeral would be paid for by the state, noting that he had been honoured in 2005 for excellence in art.

A street in Lempa, where the Cyprus College of Art had been based, was later named in his memory. The later Lempa Cultural Village project was described by the Cyprus Architects Association as the realisation of a vision publicly announced in 2006 by Paraskos and the then Minister of Education, Akis Cleanthous.

In 2017, Paraskos was the subject of an exhibition in Paphos as part of the city’s programme as European Capital of Culture.

== Books on Stass Paraskos ==
- Norbert Lynton, Stass Paraskos (London: Orage Press, 2003)
- Michael Paraskos, Stass Paraskos: Critical Frameworks (London: Orage Press, 2026)
- Μάικλ Παράσκος, Στας Παράσκος: Κριτικά Πλαίσια (Λονδίνο: Orage Press, 2027)
