= Michael Paraskos =

British-Cypriot art historian and writer

- Born: 1969 (age 56–57); Leeds, Yorkshire, England
- Education: University of Leeds; University of Nottingham
- Occupations: Art historian, writer, lecturer
- Writing career
- Genres: Art history, art criticism, fiction
- Notable works: Herbert Read: Art and Idealism; In Search of Sixpence

Michael Paraskos (born 1969) is a British-Cypriot art historian, writer and lecturer. He has written on modern and contemporary art, with particular interests in British art, Cypriot art, Herbert Read, and the relationship between art and anarchist thought. He has also published fiction, including the novel In Search of Sixpence.

Paraskos is a Senior Teaching Fellow in the Centre for Languages, Culture and Communication at Imperial College London, where he is Programme Manager for Imperial after:hours. He has also taught art history at the City and Guilds of London Art School.

== Early life and education ==
Paraskos was born in Leeds, Yorkshire, in 1969, to Cypriot parents. His father was the Cypriot artist Stass Paraskos. His family later moved to Kent, where he attended school in Canterbury.

He studied at the University of Leeds and later completed a doctorate at the University of Nottingham, where his research focused on the aesthetic theories of the poet, art critic and theorist Herbert Read.

== Career ==
Paraskos has worked in art history teaching and adult education in Britain and Cyprus. From the early 2000s, he worked in Cyprus, where he administered the Larnaca site of the Cyprus College of Art for about ten years.

He later worked in London higher education, including at the City and Guilds of London Art School and Imperial College London. At Imperial, he is a Senior Teaching Fellow in Art History and Programme Manager for Imperial after:hours.

Paraskos has contributed essays and reviews to publications including The British Art Journal, The Guardian and The Spectator.

He is also the editor Pygmalion: Provocations in Contemporary Carving, a series of journal-like publications on contemporary stone and wood carving.

== Writing on art and anarchism ==
Paraskos's writing has explored connections between modern art, cultural theory and anarchist ideas. His book Herbert Read: Art and Idealism examined Read's aesthetic theories, while Four Essays on Art and Anarchism brought together essays on art, politics and cultural theory. His later art-historical writing includes Stass Paraskos: Critical Frameworks, published in 2026.

Although some commentary has associated his work with anarchist cultural theory, Paraskos has described his own political position in more qualified terms, including through references to syndicalism and co-operative traditions.

== Fiction ==
Paraskos's first novel, In Search of Sixpence, was published in 2016.

== Selected publications ==
The following is a selected list of publications by Paraskos.

- The Anarchists/Οι Αναρχικοί (Nicosia: Εν Τύποις, 2007)
- Steve Whitehead (London: Orage Press, 2007)
- Re-reading Read: New Views on Herbert Read, editor (London: Freedom Press, 2007)
- The Aphorisms of Irsee, with Clive Head (London: Orage Press, 2008)
- The Table Top Schools of Art (London: Orage Press, 2008)
- Is Your Artwork Really Necessary? (London: Orage Press, 2008)
- Clive Head (London: Lund Humphries, 2010)
- Regeneration (London: Orage Press, 2010)
- Herbert Read: Art and Idealism (London: Orage Press, 2014)
- Four Essays on Art and Anarchism (London: Orage Press, 2015)
- In Search of Sixpence (London: Friction Fiction, 2016)
- Pygmalion 1: Provocations in Contemporary Carving, editor (London: Orage Press, 2024)
- Barfrestone (London: Orage Press, 2024)
- Stass Paraskos: Critical Frameworks (London: Orage Press, 2026)
