= List of sculptures by Barbara Hepworth =

Dame Barbara Hepworth (10 January 1903 – 20 May 1975) was an English artist and sculptor. During a career spanning 50 years she produced over 500 sculptures in a variety of media including plaster, wood, stone and metal.

As well as her public commissions and works in museums, this list includes works by Hepworth in private collections that have been shown in exhibitions of her work.

Where an Edition of ... quantity is stated, this number will include the Artist's Copy, also known as the Reserved Copy.

Dimensions are given in the order height by width by depth unless stated otherwise.

The BH number, in the Designation column, refers to the number assigned to the work in the catalogue raisonné of Hepworth's work.

== 1920 to 1924 ==
Image	Title / subject	Location and coordinates	Date	Type	Material	Dimensions	Designation	Wikidata	Notes
	The Pond (Two Figures)		c. 1922		Glazed porcelain	21.0 x 6.3 x 8.5 cm			
	Jill and Peggy		1923		Plaster relief	28.8 x 33.2 cm			
	Venus (Figure II	Aberdeen Art Gallery	1922-23, cast 1925		Bronze	52.7 cm high			
	Prototype for Mrs A.R.T Richards (Quita)	The Hepworth Wakefield	1924-25		Plaster	33.0 x 17.0 x 25.0 cm			
	Mrs A.R.T Richards (Quita)	The Hepworth Wakefield	1924-25		Bronze	33.0 x 17.0 x 25.0 cm			

== 1925 to 1929 ==
Image	Title / subject	Location and coordinates	Date	Type	Material	Dimensions	Designation	Wikidata	Notes
More images	Doves (Group)	Manchester Art Gallery	1927		Parian marble	29.0 x 33.0 x 21.5 cm	BH 3	Q138685583	
	Mother and Child	Art Gallery of Ontario	1927		Hoptonwood stone	45.0 x 27.6 x 21.0 cm	BH 6		
	Torso	Barbara Hepworth Museum	1928		Hoptonwood stone on a wooden base	36.2 x 17.1 x 10.2 cm	BH 12		
	Toad	Private collection	1928		Green onyx on Hoptonwood stone base	13.5 x 17.5 x 13.5 cm			
	Mask	The Hepworth Wakefield	1928		Pentelicon marble	33.8 x 29.7 x 20.5 cm	BH 14		
	Infant	Barbara Hepworth Museum	1929		Burmese wood	43.8 x 27.3 x 25.4 cm	BH 24		
	Contemplative Figure	Private collection	1929		Polyphant stone	44.5 cm high			
	Mother and Child	Whereabouts unknown	1929		Brown Hornton stone	35.6 cm long			
	Torso	Whitworth Art Gallery	1929		African ivory wood	68.6 cm high			
	Musician	Private collection	1929-30		White Alabaster	45.7 cm high	BH 19		
	Standing Figure	Private collection	1929-30		Teak	57.0 x 14.0 x 13.0 cm	BH 26		
More images	Figure of a Women	Tate Britain	1929-30		Corsehill stone with marble base	53.3 x 30.5 x 27.9 cm	BH 27		

== 1930 to 1934 ==
Image	Title / subject	Location and coordinates	Date	Type	Material	Dimensions	Designation	Wikidata	Notes
	Torso	The Whitworth	1930		Burmese rosewood	33.7 x 9.0 x 9.8 cm; plinth 8.1 x 11.5 x 9.0 cm			
	Head	Leicester Museum and Art Gallery	1930-31		Cumberland alabaster	28.0 x 17.0 x 40.0 cm	BH 32		
	Figure in Sycamore	Pier Arts Centre, Orkney	1931		Sycamore	118.0 x 33.0 x 33.0 cm including base			
	Pierced Form	N/A	1932		Pink alabaster	25.4 cm high	BH 35		Destroyed in World War II
	Two Heads	Pier Arts Centre	1932		Cumberland alabaster	30.0 x 37.5 x 22.7 cm	BH 38		
	Torso	Aberdeen Art Gallery	1932		African blackwood	108.0 x 18.0 x 16.5 cm plus base	BH 41		
	Kneeling Figure	The Hepworth Wakefield	1932		Rosewood	67.5 x 32.0 x 28.8 cm	BH 42		
	Reclining Figure	Hirshhorn Museum and Sculpture Garden	1932		Alabaster	17.8 x 30.5 x 15.8 cm	BH 44		
	Sculpture with Profiles	Tate Britain	1932		Alabaster on alabaster base	23.0 x 23.9 x 15.0 cm	BH 45		
	Seated Figure	Barbara Hepworth Museum	1932-35		Lignum vitae	35.6 x 26.7 x 20.3 cm	BH 46		
	Figure	Tate, long-term loan from a private collection	1933		Grey alabaster on a slate base	21.0 x 14.7 x 8.0 cm	BH 47		
	Two Forms	Tate Britain	1933		Pink alabaster on limestone base	26.0 x 29.6 x 17.6 cm	BH 51		
	Mother and Child	Private collection	1934		White alabaster	9.0 x 16.0 x 8.2 cm and 5.0 x 5.0 x 3.0 cm	BH 57		
	Mother and Child	Tate Britain	1934		Cumberland alabaster	23.0 x 45.5 x 18.9 cm	BH 58		
	Mother and Child	The Hepworth Wakefield	1934		Pink Ancaster stone	30.5 x 22.0 x 26.0 cm			
	Large and Small Form	Pier Arts Centre	1934		White alabaster	24.8 x 44.5 x 23.9 cm	BH 59		
	Single Form	Private collection	1934		Iron and stone	15.0 x 6.5 x 7.5 cm	BH 61B		
	Two Forms	Private collection	1934		Grey alabaster		BH 64		
	Two Forms	Private collection	1934		White alabaster	14.5 x 29.2 x 15.2 cm	BH 65		

== 1935 to 1939 ==
Image	Title / subject	Location and coordinates	Date	Type	Material	Dimensions	Designation	Wikidata	Notes
More images	Three Forms	Tate Britain	1935		Three Seravezza marble forms on a marble base	21.0 x 53.2 x 34.3 cm	BH 72		
	Discs in Echelon	MoMA New York	1935		Padouk wood	31.1 x 49.1 x 22.5 cm	BH 73		
	Discs in Echelon, version 2	Sainsbury Centre for Visual Arts	1935-36		Plaster	35.0 x 52.0 x 28.0 cm	BH 73B		
	Discs in Echelon, version 4	Tate	1935, cast 1959		Carved in wood 1935, cast in bronze 1959	34.8 x 50.5 x 27.4 cm	BH 73, version 4		
	Two Segments and Sphere	Private collection	1935-36		White marble	26.7 x 26.7 x 21.6 cm	BH 79		
	Form	Private collection	1936		White marble	29.0 x 21.5 x 19.0 cm	BH 82		
	Monumental Stele	N/A	1936		Blue Ancaster stone		BH 83		Destroyed in World War II
	Carving (Sculpture)	Private collection	1936		Blue Ancaster stone	34.2 cm high	BH 87		
	Ball, Plane and Hole	Tate	1936		Teak	21.0 x 61.1 x 30.5 cm	BH 81		
	Nesting Stones	Hiroshima Prefectural Art Museum	1937		Seravezza marble	30.5 cm high	BH 90		
	Two Forms	The Hepworth Wakefield	1937		Seravezza marble		BH 96		
	Conoid, Sphere and Hollow I	MoMA New York	1937		Marble	30.5 X 40.8 cm			
	Conoid, Sphere and Hollow III	UK Government Art Collection	1937		White marble		BH 100A		
	Single Form	Hepworth estate	1937		Lignum vitae	58.0 x 16.0 x 16.0 cm			
	Single Form	Leeds Art Gallery	1937		Holly wood	78.7 cm high	BH 102		
	Single Form		1937-38		Sandalwood		BH 103		Purchased by Dag Hammarskjöld in 1956
More images	Single Form	Tate	1937-38, painted about 1968		Plaster and paint	148.2 x 27.0 x 31.5 cm	BH 104		Cast in bronze as BH 329 (1963)
	Pierced Hemisphere I	The Hepworth Wakefield	1937		White marble	35.0 x 38.0 x 38.0 cm	BH 93		
	Pierced Hemisphere II	Tate	1937-38		Hoptonwood stone on a Portland stone base	43.5 x 38.0 x 38.0 cm			
	Forms in Echelon	Tate	1938		Tulipwood on elm base	108.0 x 60.0 x 71.0 cm	BH 107		
	Two Forms	Tate	1938		Honduras mahogany	38.5 x 37.0 x 27.0 cm			
	Helicords in Sphere	The Museum of Modern Art, Gunma	1938		Teak	30.5 cm high			
	Sculpture with Colour, White, Blue and Red Strings	N/A	1939		Plaster		BH 113		Broken up in the casting of BH 113B (1961)

== 1940 to 1944 ==
Image	Title / subject	Location and coordinates	Date	Type	Material	Dimensions	Designation	Wikidata	Notes
	Sculpture with Colour (Deep Blue and Red) 1	Private collection	1940		Painted plaster and strings	10.0 x 9.0 x 8.0 cm plus base	BH 117A		
More images	Sculpture with Colour (Deep Blue and Red) 2	Barbara Hepworth Museum	1940		Painted plaster and strings	11.5 x 15.2 x 10.7	BH 117B / BH 117.2		Previously owned by Wilhelmina Barns-Graham
	Sculpture with Colour (Deep Blue and Red) 3	Private collection	1940		Painted plaster and strings	12.0 x 13.5 x 14.4 cm plus base	BH 117C		
	Sculpture with Colour (Deep Blue and Red) 4	The Hepworth Wakefield	1940		Painted plaster and strings	21.5 x 21.0 x 23.5 cm plus base & turntable	BH 117D		
	Sculpture with Colour (Deep Blue and Red) 5	Private collection	1941		Painted plaster and strings	15.5 x 20.6 x 18.4 cm including base	BH 117E		
More images	Sculpture with Colour (Deep Blue and Red) 6	Private collection	1943		Painted wood and strings	25.0 x 28.5 x 28.0 cm plus base	BH 118		
More images	Sculpture with Colour (Oval Form) Pale Blue and Red	The Hepworth Wakefield	1943		Painted wood and strings	31.5 x 50.0 x 40.5 cm	BH 119		
	Two Figures	Art Gallery of Ontario	1943		Redwood with strings	61.2 x 31.4 x 21.0 cm	BH 120		
	Oval Sculpture	Pier Arts Centre	1943		Plane wood with painted concavities	34.9 x 46.2 x 29.9 cm			Two plaster copies made in 1958, bronze casts in 1959
More images	Wave	Scottish National Gallery of Modern Art	1943-44		Painted plane wood and strings	30.5 x 44.5 x 21.0 cm	BH 122		
	Head Sculpture	Private collection	1944		Satinwood	22.9 x 17.9 x 17.9 cm	BH 123		
	Wood and Strings	Private collection	1944		Painted plane wood and strings	90.8 x 40.7 x 24.6 cm	BH 125		
	Convolute	Private collection	1944		Cumberland alabaster	25.4 cm long	BH 126		
	Landscape Sculpture	Barbara Hepworth Museum	1944		Elm & strings	32.0 x 68.0 x 29.0 cm	BH 127		Cast in bronze in 1961

== 1945 to 1949 ==
Image	Title / subject	Location and coordinates	Date	Type	Material	Dimensions	Designation	Wikidata	Notes
	Small Forms Resting	Sheldon Museum of Art	1945		Marble	22.9 x 31.1 x 26.7 cm	BH 129		
	Elegy	Private collection	1945		Beech wood	38.1 cm high	BH 131		
	Single Form (Dryad)	Private collection	1945-46		Cornish elm	195.0 X 34.0 X 28.0 cm	BH 132		
More images	Pelagos	Tate Britain	1946		Painted elm wood and strings	43.0 x 46.0 x 38.5 cm	BH 133		
	Elegy II	Carnegie Museum of Art	1946		Elm	50.2 x 26.4 x 21.3 cm	BH 134		
	Bird (Hand Sculpture)	Israel Museum, Jerusalem	1945		Sandalwood	34.9 cm long			
	Involute I	Private collection	1946		White stone	26.7 cm high	BH 135		
	Anthos	Private collection	1946		White marble, yellow paint	16.6 x 34.5 x 26.5 cm	BH 136		
	Involute II	Pier Arts Centre	1946		Pink Lancaster stone	32.9 x 46.0 x 33.1 cm	BH 138		
	Tides I	Tate	1946		Painted Holly wood	33.7 x 63.2 x 29.8 cm			
More images	Tides II	The Hepworth Wakefield	1946		Painted plane wood on a wooden base	34.5 x 46.0 x 27.5 cm plus base	BH 140		
More images	Sculpture with Colour (Eos)	Private collection	1946		Painted Hoptonwood stone	59.1 cm high plus base	BH 141		
More images	Curved Stone with Yellow	Private collection	1946		Stone and paint on a wood base	14.0 x 26.0 x 25.0 cm plus base	BH 142		
	Model for sculpture for Waterloo Bridge	Scottish National Gallery of Modern Art, Leeds Art Gallery, Tate	1946-47		Plaster & stone versions	10.3 x 21.0 x 6.5 cm			Two maquettes and a 1/8th size model were made
	Pendour	Hirshhorn Museum and Sculpture Garden	1947		Painted plane wood	30.6 X 106.7 X 23.8 cm	BH 145		
More images	Eidos	National Gallery of Victoria	1947		Portland stone and paint	37.2 x 50.7 x 28.2 cm	BH 146		
	Two Figures	Weisman Art Museum	1947-48		Painted elmwood	121.9 cm high			
	Helikon	MoMA New York	1948		Portland stone	61.6 cm high			
	Biolith	Yale Center for British Art	1948-49		Blue limestone	119.4 x 67.3 x 38.1 cm			
	Ecocene	St Albans Girls School, St Albans	1948-49		Marble				
	The Cosdon Head	Birmingham City Art Gallery	1949		Blue marble	63.5 x 36.5 x 54.0 cm	BH 157		
	Rhythmic Form	British Council	1949		Rosewood	104.3 x 40.7 x 22.8 cm	BH 158		
	Bicentric Form	Tate	1949		Blue limestone	158.7 x 48.3 x 31.1 cm	BH 160		
	Dyad	Scottish National Gallery of Modern Art	1949		Himalayan rosewood	118.0 x 40.5 x 22.0 cm			
	Hand I (vertical)	Hepworth estate	1949-50		Plaster		BH 162		
	Hand II (horizontal)		1949-50		Bronze		BH 163		

== 1950 to 1954 ==
Image	Title / subject	Location and coordinates	Date	Type	Material	Dimensions	Designation	Wikidata	Notes
	Turning Forms	Marlborough Science Academy, St Albans	1950		Reinforced concrete	213.4 cm high	BH 166	Q26282973	
More images	Contrapuntal Forms	Glebelands, Harlow, Essex	1950-51		Irish blue limestone	3.04 m high	BH 165	Q26282978	
	Vertical Forms	Art + Design Gallery, University of Hertfordshire	1951		Hoptonwood stone	1.66 m high	BH 169		
	Apollo	Barbara Hepworth Museum	1951		Painted steel rods in a concrete base	173.5 x 102.0 x 84.0 cm	BH 167		
	Group I (Concourse) February 4 1951	Barbara Hepworth Museum	1951		Seravezza marble	24.8 x 50.5 x 29.5 cm	BH 171		
	Rock Form	St Ives Library	1951		Portland stone & paint	61.0 x 44.0 x 30.0 cm			
	Image	Tate	1951-52		Hoptonwood stone	159.0 x 51.0 x 46.0 cm	BH 173		
	Maquette for Garden Sculpture	Kettle's Yard, Cambridge	1951-52		Plaster and wire		BH 170		
	Form in Tension later Poised Form	Barbara Hepworth Museum	1951-52, reworked 1957		Limestone and steel rods	117.0 x 45.5 x 38.0 cm	BH 172		Reworked & re-named in 1957 with the removal of the steel rods
	Young Girl	Private collection	1951-52		Mahogany	158.6 cm high	BH 176		
	Group II (people waiting)	Private collection	1952		Seravezza marble		BH 181		
	Group III (Evocation)	Pier Arts Centre, Orkney	1952		Seravezza marble	27.9 x 67.2 x 22.6 cm	BH 182		
	Three Figures - Conversation	N/A	1951-52		Alabaster	30.0 cm high	BH 183		Damaged beyond repair 1962-63
	Figure (Churinga)	Walker Art Center, Minneapolis	1952		Spanish mahogany	123 x 31.1 x 31.3 cm	BH 177		
	The Unknown Political Prisoner	Tate, two pieces, private collection, one piece	1952		Wood and iron	53.0 x 23.8 x 14.3 cm; 50.5 x 22.0 x 13.3 cm	BH 186		
	Pastorale	Kröller-Müller Museum	1952		Seravezza marble	114.3 cm length	BH 192		
	Single Form (Antiphon)	Ashmolean Museum, Oxford	1953		Boxwood	207.0 x 16.6 x 14.0 cm	BH 187		Cast in bronze as BH 490 (1969)
More images	Monolith (Empyrean)	Kenwood House, London	1953		Limestone		BH 190	Q27086184	
	Hieroglyph	Leeds Art Gallery	1953		Ancaster stone	101.8 x 86.0 x 45.0 cm	BH 188		
	Hand Sculpture (Turning Form)	Private collection	1953		Sandalwood	41.9 cm long	BH 189		
	Madonna and Child	St Ia's Church, St Ives	1954		White marble		BH 193		
	Two Figures (Menhirs)	Art Institute of Chicago	1954-55		Teak and paint	144.8 x 61.9 x 44.4 cm	BH 197		
	Corinthos	Tate	1954-55		Painted Guarea wood	104.1 x 106.7 x 101.6 cm	BH 198		

== 1955 to 1959 ==
Image	Title / subject	Location and coordinates	Date	Type	Material	Dimensions	Designation	Wikidata	Notes
	Curved Form (Delphi)	Ulster Museum	1955		Painted Guarea wood with strings		BH 199		
	Configuration (Phira)	Leeds Art Gallery	1955		Guarea wood	67.7 x 67.7 x 63.5 cm	BH 200		
More images	Oval Sculpture (Delos)	National Museum Cardiff	1955		Guarea wood	85.8 x 119.3 x 75.0 cm	BH 201		
	Hollow Form (Penwith)	MoMA New York	1955-56		Painted Lagos wood	89.8 x 65.7 x 64.8 cm	BH 202		
	Oval Form (Penwith Landscape)	Private collection	1955-56		Scented guarea wood with painted cavities	68.5 high x 97.0 cm wide	BH 203		
	Idol	Hepworth estate	1955-56		Boxwood	78.8 x 15.5 x 15.5 cm	BH 206		
	Vertical Form	Mildred Lane Kemper Art Museum	1955-56		Mahogany	98.7 x 32.8 x 19.2 cm			
	Aegean	British Council	1956		Bronze	30.0 x 29.0 x 25.0 cm			
	Fugue	Fitzwilliam Museum	1956		Mahogany and string	78.0 cm tall			
	Curved Form (Pavan)	The Hepworth Wakefield	1956		Metallised plaster	52.0 x 80.0 x 48.5 cm	BH 210		
	Forms in Movement (Pavan)	N/A	1956		Concrete	114.3 cm wide	BH 211		Destroyed in the casting process for BH 453 (1967)
	Forms in Movement (Galliard)	Edition of four:- Aratoi Wairarapa Museum of Art and History	1956		Copper	43.2 x 76.2 x 50.8 cm	BH 212		
More images	Curved Form (Trevalgan)	Edition of six:- Pier Arts Centre, Tate St Ives, British Council, Buffalo AKG Art Museum, Kröller-Müller Museum	1956		Bronze	91.5 x 59.0 x 50.0 cm	BH 213	Q99203687	
	Involute II	Edition of seven:- Tate, Mildred Lane Kemper Art Museum, Philadelphia Museum of Art	1956		Bronze on a wooden base	21.3 x 19.1 x 16.8 cm including base	BH 218		
	Stone Sculpture (Fugue II)	Barbara Hepworth Museum	1956		Limestone	135.0 x 52.5 x 41.5 cm	BH 220		
	Orpheus (Maquette 1)	Edition of eight;- Pier Arts Centre	1956		Brass and string	52.2 x 22.5 x 18.9 cm	BH 221		
	Orpheus (Maquette 2)	Edition of eight;- Detroit Institute of Art	1956		Brass and string, wood base	61 cm high	BH 222		
	Theme on Electronics (Orpheus)	Private collection	1956				BH 223		Formerly at Phillips Electronics, Dorking
	Stringed Figure (Curlew) (Version I)	Edition of nine	1956		Brass with strings		BH 255A		
	Stringed Figure (Curlew) (Version II)	Edition of three;- Barbara Hepworth Museum, Carlsberg Foundation, Denmark	1956		Brass with strings on a wooden base	51.4 x 76.8 x 43.2 cm	BH 255		
More images	Perianth	Tate Modern	1948, reworked to two forms in 1957		Portland stone				
More images	Winged Figure I	Bristol Museum and Art Gallery	1957		Bronze, wire and isopon				
	Maquette for Winged Figure	British Council	1957		Brass, wood and cotton	63.0 x 29.5 x 24.3 cm	BH 227		
	Icon	Arts Council Collection	1957		Wood	49.0 x 37.0 x 30.0 cm			
	Requiem	Aberdeen Art Gallery	1957		Walnut	218.0 x 56.0 x 41.0 cm			
	Pierced Form (Toledo)	Private collection ?	1957		Mahogany with strings	89.5 cm high plus base	BH 232		
	Torso (Ulysses)	Edition of six:- Hirshhorn Museum and Sculpture Garden, Art Gallery of Ontario	1958		Bronze	132 cm high	BH 233		
	Torso II (Torcello)	Edition of six:- Barbara Hepworth Museum	1958		Bronze	88.3 x 50.0 x 36.0 cm	BH 234		
	Torso III (Galatea)	British Council, Abbot Hall Art Gallery	1958		Bronze	59.0 x 35.0 x 18.0 cm	BH 235		
More images	Ascending Form (Gloria)	Edition of seven:- Arts Council Collection, Royal Botanic Gardens, Edinburgh, Longstone Cemetery, Cornwall, Murray Edwards College, The Hepworth Wakefield	1958		Bronze	195.0 x 53.0 x 50.0 cm	BH 239		
	Cantate Domino	Edition of six: Barbara Hepworth Museum, Middelheim Open Air Sculpture Museum, McNay Art Museum, São Paulo Museum of Modern Art, Philadelphia Museum of Art	1958		Bronze	209.5 x 53.0 x 50.5 cm	BH 244		
	Garden Sculpture (Model for Meridian)	Edition of six:- Barbara Hepworth Museum, New College, Oxford	1958		Bronze	161.5 x 93.0 x 54.0 cm	BH 246		
	Maquette (Variations on a theme)	Art Gallery of Ontario, British Council	1958		Bronze	44.0 x 22.7 x 18.0 cm	BH 247		
More images	Sea Form (Porthmeor)	Edition of seven:- Tate, British Council, Yale University Art Gallery, Hirshhorn Museum and Sculpture Garden, Art Gallery of Ontario, Kunstmuseum Den Haag	1958		Bronze with mottled green patina	76.8 x 113.7 x 25.4 cm	BH 249		
	Figure (Oread)	Edition of seven:- Art Gallery of Ontario, Norton Simon Museum	1958		Bronze	69.0 x 41.0 x 22.8 cm			
	Oval Sculpture (No.2)	Edition of two:- Tate, Barbara Hepworth Museum	1958		Plaster	29.3 x 40.0 x 25.5 cm	BH 121.2		Copies of Oval Sculpture (1943)
	Oval Sculpture (No.2)	Edition of four: Israel Museum	1959		Polished bronze	33.3 x 45.7 x 33.5 cm	BH 121.3		Cast from BH 121.2 (1958)
More images	Orpheus (Maquette 2) (Version II)	Edition of three;- Tate Britain, Art Gallery of New South Wales	1959		Brass and string, teak base	114.9 x 43.2 x 41.5 cm	BH 222 version 2		
	Figure (Chün)	Private collection	1959		Pink alabaster	32.8 cm plus base	BH 252		
	Holed Stone	Art Gallery of Ontario	1959		White alabaster	27.0 x 19.8 x 19.2 cm	BH 257		
	Reclining Form (Trewyn)	Edition of seven: Barbara Hepworth estate, Philadelphia Museum of Art, Los Angeles County Museum of Art	1959		Bronze on a wooden base	30.0 x 70.0 x 19.0 cm	BH 262		
	Figure (Archaean)	The Hepworth Wakefield	1959		Plaster	225.0 x 137.0 x 30.5 cm			Cast in bronze as BH 263 (1959)
More images	Figure (Archaean)	Edition of seven;- St Catherine's College, Oxford, University of Stirling, Mildred Lane Kemper Art Museum, Kröller-Müller Museum, Ulrich Museum of Art	1959		Bronze	227.3 x 132.0 x 55.9 cm	BH 263		
	Corymb	Edition of ten: Barbara Hepworth Museum, Morsbroich Museum	1959		Bronze	33.7 x 34.5 x 25.6 cm	BH 270		
More images	Curved Form with Inner Form - Anima	Glynn Vivian Art Gallery	1959		Bronze	63.0 x 70.0 x 37.0 cm			
	Curved Form (Wave II)	Art Gallery of Western Australia	1959		Bronze & steel	24.5 x 43.0 x 39.5 cm			Cast from a work of 1944
More images	Figure (Nyanga)	Tate Modern	1959-60		Elm on a plywood base	90.8 x 57.1 cm	BH 273		

== 1960 to 1964 ==
Image	Title / subject	Location and coordinates	Date	Type	Material	Dimensions	Designation	Wikidata	Notes
	Image II	Tate	1960		White marble on a base of mahogany	82.9 x 74.0 x 58.5 cm	BH 277		
	Figure (Chün)	Art Gallery of Ontario	1960		Polished bronze	35.5 x 21.6 x 15.2 cm	BH 279		
	Coré	Edition of two:- The Hepworth Wakefield	1960		Plaster	75.0 x 40.5 x 30.5 cm	BH 208		Two plaster copies of a marble carving of 1955-56
	Coré	Edition of seven:- Barbara Hepworth Museum, The Whitworth	1960		Bronze	79.5 x 46.0 x 36.0 cm	BH 208B		
	Meridian, Sculpture for State House	Donald M. Kendall Sculpture Gardens	1958-60		Bronze	4.6 m high	BH 250	Q22695771	
	Figure (Sunion)	Private collection ?	1960		Elm	189.3 cm high plus base	BH 274		
	Talisman II	Ashmolean Museum	1960		White marble		BH 276		
	Curved Form (Patmos)	Private collection	1960		Alabaster		BH 284		
	Curved Form	Private collection ?	1960		Walnut	46.3 cm high plus base	BH 275		
More images	Figure for Landscape	Edition of seven;- Barbara Hepworth Museum, Exeter University, Hirshhorn Museum and Sculpture Garden, J. Paul Getty Museum, San Diego Museum of Art, Dallas Museum of Art	1960		Bronze	269.3 x 137.0 x 74.0 cm	BH 287	Q5448021	
	Curved Form (Oracle)	The Hepworth Wakefield	1960		Painted guarea wood		BH 288		
	Pierced Round Form	British Council	1960		Bronze	22.0 x 17.0 x 8.5 cm			
	Pierced Form (Epidauros)	Barbara Hepworth Museum	1960		Painted guarea wood	74.0 x 67.6 x 36.0 cm	BH 290		
More images	Curved Reclining Form (Rosewall)	Chesterfield, Derbyshire	1960		Nebrasina stone		BH 291	Q26677714	
	Landscape Sculpture	Edition of seven; Tate, San Francisco Museum of Modern Art	1961		Bronze & string	27.1 x 65.5 x 26.8 cm plus base	BH 127		Cast from BH 127 (1944)
	Reclining Solitary Form (Amulet)	Dallas Museum of Art	1961		Bronze				
	Sculpture with Colour and Strings	Edition of ten;- Ingram Collection of Modern British Art	1961		Bronze & strings	24.8 cm high	BH 113B		Cast from BH 113 (1939) which was destroyed in the casting process
	Two Forms in Echelon	Edition of seven;- University of Southampton, Art Gallery of Western Australia, Birmingham Museum of Art, Rupert Museum Stellenbosch	1961		Bronze	117.0 x 111.0 x 60.8 cm	BH 301B		
	Two Forms Pierced	Private collection	1961-62		White alabaster	29.2 cm high	BH 302		
More images	Epidauros II	Edition of seven: The Malakoff, St Ives, Harrison Sculpture Garden at University of Minnesota Landscape Arboretum	1961		Bronze	80.0 x 48.0 x 34.0 cm	BH 303	Q123168151	
More images	Curved Form (Bryher II)	Edition of seven;- San Francisco Museum of Modern Art, Hirshhorn Museum and Sculpture Garden, De Doelen Rotterdam, Mary and Leigh Block Museum of Art	1961		Bronze	233.2 x 120.7 x 77.5 cm	BH 305		
	Prototype for Maquette: Three Forms in Echelon		1961		Painted plaster on hardboard				
	Maquette: Three Forms in Echelon	Edition of ten;- Tate, Art Gallery of Ontario	Maquette 1961, casts 1965		Casts in bronze; maquette in brass and string on wood	67.2 x 50.3 x 21.8 cm	BH 306B		
	Single Form (Chun Quoit)	The Hepworth Wakefield	1961		Painted plaster	106.0 x 66.5 x 45.0 cm			
	Single Form (Chun Quoit)	Edition of seven;- Barbara Hepworth Museum	1961		Bronze	113.0 x 50.8 x 5.7 cm	BH 311		
	Single Form (September)	Barbara Hepworth Museum	1961		Walnut	82.5 x 50.8 x 5.7 cm	BH 312		
More images	Single Form (Memorial)	Edition of two;- Battersea Park London, School of Advanced International Studies Washington D.C.	1961		Bronze	3.0 m high	BH 314	Q22338742	
	Prototype for Winged Figure	The Hepworth Wakefield	1961-62		Aluminium with aluminium rods	587.5 x 254.0 x 159.5 cm			
More images	Winged Figure	John Lewis Building, Oxford Street, London	1961-62		Aluminium with steel rods	5.8 m high	BH 315	Q16903550	
More images	Oval Form (Trezion)	Edition of eight;- Abbot Hall Art Gallery, Aberdeen Art Gallery, British Library, Franklin D. Murphy Sculpture Garden, Kröller-Müller Museum, Te Papa, New Zealand	1961-63		Bronze	94.0 x 144.0 x 87.0 cm	BH 304	Q99203688	
	Vertical Form	Art Gallery of Ontario	1962		Bronze	67.1 cm high	BH 353		
	Square Forms	Edition of nine: Barbara Hepworth Museum	1962		Bronze	34.3 x 19.0 x 8.9 cm	BH 313		
	Bronze Form (Patmos)	Edition of seven;- Barbara Hepworth Museum	1962-63		Bronze	71.0 x 97.0 x 25.0 cm	BH 321		
	Upright Form (Gwithian)	Private collection	1962		White alabaster	29.8 cm high	BH 324		
	Single Form (Rosewood)	Private collection	1962-63		Rosewood	49.5 cm high	BH 310		
	Bird Form	Edition of nine: Roche Court Sculpture Park and Gallery	1963		Bronze	36.0 x 26.0 x 27.0 cm			
	Hollow Form with Inner Form	The Hepworth Wakefield	1963		Plaster	125.8 x 70.5 x 74.5 cm			Cast in bronze as BH 469 (1968).
More images	Sphere with Inner Form	Edition of eight;- Barbara Hepworth Museum, Kröller-Müller Museum, The Whitworth, Yale Center for British Art, San Francisco Museum of Modern Art	1963		Bronze	101.0 x 96.0 x 96.0 cm	BH 333	Q7576685	
	Two Forms with White (Greek)	The Hepworth Wakefield	1963		Painted guarea wood	121.5 x 94.4 x 63.0 cm	BH 346		Cast in bronze as BH 491 (1969)
	Single Form (Eikon)	Edition of eight;- Tate, Kröller-Müller Museum, Government Art Collection at the British Embassy, Washington D.C, Metropolitan Museum of Art, Milwaukee Art Museum	1963		Bronze	148.0 x 28.0 x 32.0 cm	BH 329	Q99203699	Cast from BH 104 (1937-38)
More images	Squares with Two Circles	Edition of four: Yorkshire Sculpture Park, University of Liverpool, Kröller-Müller Museum, Nasher Sculpture Center	1963		Bronze	306.1 x 137.2 x 31.8 cm	BH 347	Q99203696	
More images	Square Forms and Circles	McGill University, Israel Museum, Jerusalem, J. Erik Jonsson Central Library, Storm King Art Center	1963		Bronze	258.0 x 71.0 x 154.0 cm	BH 326	Q37382144	
	Hollow Form with White Interior	Private collection	1963		Painted guarea wood	104.1 x 80.0 x 37.0 cm	BH 328		
	Pierced Hemisphere I (Telstar)	Private collection ?	1963		Painted guarea wood and strings	97.0 x 62.0 x 92.0 cm			
	Two Forms in Echelon	Private collection	1963		Slate	45.8 cm high	BH 351		
	Small Oval	Private collection	1963		Alabaster on a slate base	21.6 cm long	BH 352		
	Maquette for Monolith	The Hepworth Wakefield	1963-64		Painted plaster on a wood base	32.0 x 19.0 x 5.0 cm			
More images	Single Form	United Nations Plaza, New York City	1961-64		Bronze	6.4m high	BH 325		
	Square Forms (Two Sequences)	Edition of eight;- Keele University	1963-64		Bronze	132.1 cm high	BH 331		Edition cast in 1966
	Pierced Form	Tate	1963-64		Pentelicon marble	126.4 x 97.2 x 22.9 cm	BH 350		
	Menhirs	Private collection	1964		Teak	121.9 cm high	BH 340		
	Carved and Pierced Form	Private collection ?	1964		Serpentine marble on slate base	39.8 cm long plus base	BH 355		
	Two Figures (Menhirs)	Tate	1964		Delabole slate on a wooden base	82.5 x 63.8 x 32.0 cm	BH 361		
More images	Sea Form (Atlantic)	Edition of six;- Norwich, Dallas Museum of Art, Lynden Sculpture Garden Wisconsin,	1964		Bronze	199.4 x 106.8 x 72.4 cm	BH 362		
	Rock Form (Porthcurno)	The Hepworth Wakefield, Norton Simon Museum	1964		Painted plaster on wooden base	255.8 x 109.5 x 65.0 cm			
More images	Rock Form (Porthcurno)	Edition of six;- Royal Botanic Garden, Edinburgh, Lys Kernow Truro, Museum of Fine Arts, Boston, Franklin Parkway, Philadelphia, Norton Simon Museum	1964		Bronze	243.8 cm high	BH 363		
	Figure	Edition of seven;- University of Exeter, Carnegie Museum of Art	1964		Polished bronze	177.5 x 45.1 x 39.4 cm plus plinth			
	Figure (Walnut)	Pallant House Gallery	1964		Walnut wood	178.0 x 43.0 x 62.0 cm plus plinth			
	Figure (Walnut)	Herbert Art Gallery & Museum	1964		Bronze	184.0 x 76.5 x 63.0 cm plus plinth			

== 1965 to 1969 ==
Image	Title / subject	Location and coordinates	Date	Type	Material	Dimensions	Designation	Wikidata	Notes
	Hollow Oval (January)	Edition of nine	1965		Polished bronze	18.8 cm wide	BH 375		
	Three Personages	Kettle's Yard, Cambridge	1965		Slate on a wood base	40.0 x 35.5 x 28.0 cm	BH 378		
	Two Ancestral Figures	Alejando Freites Collection, Caracas	1965		Iroko wood	129.0 x 91.0 x 46.0 cm	BH 383		
	Hollow Form with White	Tate	1965		Elm wood	134.6 x 58.4 x 46.4 cm	BH 384		
More images	Oval With Black And White	Private collection	1965		Swedish green marble and paint on a wood base	50.0 x 36.0 x 34.0 cm	BH 387		
	Pierced Monolith with Colour	de Young Museum, San Francisco	1965		Painted Roman stone	174.0 x 116.8 x 20.3 cm	BH 388		
	Sphere with Colour (Grey and White)	University of Michigan Museum of Art	1965		Green Swedish marble and paint on a wood base	48.3 x 40.6 x 39.4 cm	BH 389		
	Contrapuntal Forms (Mycenae)	Dallas Museum of Art	1965		Carrara marble, teak base	93.98 x 130.81 x 64.77 cm			
More images	Dual Form	Edition of seven;- St Ives Guildhall, Leeds Art Gallery, Lancaster University, The Phillips Collection, Portland Art Museum, Kröller-Müller Museum	1965		Bronze	182.9 x 122.5 x 15 cm	BH 396	Q132200759	
	River Form	Ashmolean Museum	1965		American walnut		BH 401		
	Trophy (Flight)	The Hepworth Wakefield	1965		Painted plaster	43.4 x 32.4 x 7.0 cm			Later cast in bronze
	Maquette for Dual Form	The Phillips Collection	1966		Bronze	51.8 x 36.8 x 18.4 cm			
	Oval Form with Strings and Colour	Metropolitan Museum of Art	1966		Painted elm & strings	77.5 x 54.9 x 54.0 cm			
	Two Forms (Gemini II)	Private collection	1966		Slate on a wood base	35.8 cm high	BH 412		
	Maquette for Large Sculpture: Three Uprights with Circles (Mykonos)	Art Gallery of Ontario	1966		Seravezza marble	28.5 x 26.8 x 12.0 cm	BH 413		
	Two Reclining Forms I	Art Gallery of Ontario	1966		Alabaster	22.7 x 20.5 x 25.3 cm	BH 414		
	Marble Rectangle with Four Circles	Kröller-Müller Museum	1966		Seravezza marble	84.5 cm high	BH 421		
	Four Rectangles with Four Oblique Circles	Yale Center for British Art	1966		Slate	35.6 x 65.7 x 18.4 cm			
	Four Square (Four Circles)	Edition of seven	1966		Bronze	67.5 x 51.0 x 26.0 cm	BH 428		
	Elegy III	The Hepworth Wakefield	1966		Painted plaster	135 x 71.5 x 56.2 cm			Made from Hollow Form with White BH 384 (1965) for casting in bronze.
	Elegy III	Edition of seven;- Franklin D. Murphy Sculpture Garden, Kröller-Müller Museum,	1966		Bronze	139.5 cm high	BH 429		
	Spring (Plaster)	The Hepworth Wakefield	1966		Plaster and strings	76.8 x 58.7 x 54.2 cm			
More images	Spring	Edition of seven;- Barbara Hepworth Museum, Arts Council Collection, The Hepworth Wakefield	1966		Bronze and strings	85.0 x 57.0 x 53.0 cm	BH 430		
More images	Four-Square (Walk Through)	Edition of three;- Barbara Hepworth Museum, Churchill College, Cambridge, Norton Simon Museum	1966		Bronze	429 x 199 x 229.5 cm	BH 433	Q60786074	
	Figure in a Landscape (Zennor)	Edition of seven;- Royal Albert Memorial Museum & Art Gallery, Portsmouth Museum and Art Gallery	1966		Bronze	14.0 x 24.0 x 12.0 cm			
	Construction (Crucifixion)	The Hepworth Wakefield	1966-67		Aluminium and paint	391.0 x 471.3 x 92.0 cm			
More images	Construction (Crucifixion)	Edition of three;- Salisbury Cathedral, Harrison Sculpture Garden, Minnesota	1966-67		Bronze and paint, steel with gold paint	366.0 x 477.5 x 28.5 cm	BH 443	Q105905938	
	Six Forms on a Circle	San Francisco Museum of Modern Art	1967		Bronze	31.8 x 61.0 x 61.0 cm			
	The Artist's Hand	Edition of seven:- Barbara Hepworth Museum	1967		Bronze on mahogany base	6.0 x 19.0 x 10.2 cm	BH 434		Cast from a plaster of 1943-44
	Three Forms (Tokio)	Private collection	1967		Delabole slate on a wood base	17.5 cm high plus base	BH 438		
	Two Forms (Orkney)	Pier Arts Centre	1967		Slate on a wood base	21.0 cm high	BH 440		
	Two Forms (Orkney)	Edition of ten;- Dudmaston Hall	1967		Bronze	19.5 x 29.0 x 20.0 cm	BH 441		Two plaster versions also exist
	Two Forms (January 1967)	Edition of nine	1967		Polished bronze	23.5 x 29.2 x 19.0 cm			
More images	Sphere with Inside and Outside Colour	Edition of seven	1967		Painted aluminium on a wood base	44.0 x 36.0 x 43.8 cm	BH 445		
	Three Forms Vertical (Offering)	Private collection	1967		White marble		BH 452		
	Forms in Movement (Pavan)	Edition of eight:- Barbara Hepworth Museum, Nelson Atkins Museum of Art, Storm King Art Center	1967		Bronze	79.5 x 106.0 x 62.5 cm	BH 453		Cast from BH 211 (1956)
	Three Hemispheres	The Hepworth Wakefield	1967		Plaster on a plaster base	Each 13.7 cm diameter			Later cast in bronze
	Three Oblique Forms (February)	The Hepworth Wakefield	1967		Plaster	23.0 x 35.5 x 16.5 cm			Later cast in polished bronze, edition of nine.
	Single Form (Nocturne)	Pallant House Gallery	1968		Irish black marble on a teak base	67.0 x 35.0 x 14.0 cm	BH 455		
	Moon Form	Abbot Hall Art Gallery	1968		White marble		BH 456		
	Grey Shell	San Diego Museum of Art	1968		Stone	38.7 x 28.6 x 13.7 cm			
	Sculpture with Colour (Deep Blue and Red)	Edition of ten	1968		Bronze and strings	15.2 cm high	BH 459		Cast from BH 117.B (1940)
	Horizontal Form	Edition of ten:- Art Institute of Chicago	1968		Bronze	31.5 x 47.0 cm			
	Two Figures	Edition of seven:- Southampton University, Indianapolis Museum of Art, University of Oklahoma, Hakone Open-Air Museum	1968		Bronze		BH 460		
	Four Figures Waiting	Edition of ten;- Higgins Art Gallery, Hakone Open-Air Museum	1968		Polished bronze	54.8 x 48.3 x 48.2 cm plus plinth	BH 461		
	Vertical Wood Form	Private collection	1968		Lignum vitae on a slate base	48.3 cm high plus base	BH 464		Cast in bronze as BH 495 (1969)
	Rhomboid I	Private collection	1968		Slate	61.3 cm high			
	Involute I	The Hepworth Wakefield	1968		Plaster	16.0 x 24.0 x 21.0 cm			Plaster version of the 1946 limestone Involute I; cast in bronze as BH 470 (1968).
	Six Forms (2 x 3)	The Hepworth Wakefield	1968		Plaster on a wood base	59.0 x 89.0 x 45.0 cm			
	Six Forms (2 x 3)	Edition of nine: Barbara Hepworth Museum	1968		Bronze	57.6 x 87.5 x 43.8 cm	BH 467		
	Small Form	Edition of nine;- St Ives Guildhall	1968		Bronze	10.0 x 12.5 x 7.0 cm	BH 468		
More images	Hollow Form with Inner Form	Edition of six;- Government Art Collection, Barbara Hepworth Museum	1968		Bronze	123.0 x 66.0 x 66.0 cm	BH 469	Q120115789	Cast from the 1963 plaster version
	Involute 1968	Edition of nine	1968		Bronze on a hardwood base	25.1 cm wide	BH 470		
More images	Three Obliques (Walk In)	Edition of two;- Cardiff University School of Music	1968		Bronze	290 cm tall	BH 473	Q29502762	
	Two Piece Marble (Rangatira)	Milwaukee Art Museum	1968-69		Marble	167.6 x 88.9 x 45.7 cm	BH 465		
More images	Two Forms (Divided Circle)	Edition of seven;- Barbara Hepworth Museum, Downing College, Cambridge, University of Bolton, Mary and Leigh Block Museum of Art	1969		Bronze	217.5 x 235.5 x 54.6 cm	BH 477	Q7858962	
	Maquette for Divided Circle	Edition of nine	1969		Polished bronze	36.9 cm high	BH 478		
	Single Form (Aloe)	Edition of eight;- Phoenix Art Museum	1969		Bronze		BH 482		
	Disc with Strings (Sun)	Edition of nine	1969		Polished bronze and string	48 cm high	BH 485		
	Two Forms (Domino)	Edition of nine	1969		Bronze with polished gold patina	21 cm high	BH 486		
	Single Form (Antiphon)	Edition of seven;- Milwaukee Art Museum	1969		Bronze	220.5 cm high	BH 490		Cast from BH 187 (1953)
	Two Forms with White (Greek)	Edition of seven: Palm Springs Art Museum	1969		Painted bronze	39.0 cm high x 48.0 cm wide	BH 491		Cast from BH 346 (1963)
More images	Two Opposing Forms (Grey and Green)	Private collection	1969		Irish marble with colour on a wood base	34.3 x 35.6 x 27.9 cm	BH 492		
	Tiki	Private collection	1969		Irish marble with colour	62.5 cm high plus base	BH 494		
	Vertical Form (St Ives)	Edition of ten: Barbara Hepworth Museum	1969		Bronze	47.0 x 25.4 x 10.2 cm	BH 495		Cast from BH 464 (1968)
	Touchstone	Tate	1969		Irish black marble	82.0 x 53.0 x 43.3 cm	BH 496		
	Two Faces	Private collection	1969		White marble	48.2 x 43.1 cm	BH 498		
	Makutu	Hepworth estate	1969		Lignum vitae		BH 499		Cast in bronze as BH 505 (1970)
	Rhomboid II	Yale University Art Gallery	1969		Black marble	50.8 x 35.6 x 28.6 cm			
	Patmos	Columbus Museum of Art	1969		Bronze	68.6 x 101.6 x 22.9 cm			

== 1970 to 1975 ==
Image	Title / subject	Location and coordinates	Date	Type	Material	Dimensions	Designation	Wikidata	Notes
	Three Forms	Edition of nine	1970		Bronze		BH 504		
	Makutu	Edition of ten:- Barbara Hepworth Museum, Christchurch Mansion	1970		Bronze	76.0 x 38.0 x 38.5 cm	BH 505		Cast from BH 499 (1969)
	Father and Child	Columbus Museum of Art	c. 1970		Irish green marble, black stone base	35.6 x 16.5 x 11.5 cm	BH 507		
	Two Forms (Black and White)	Private collection	1970		Black and white marble		BH 508		
	Maquette, Theme and Variations	The Hepworth Wakefield	1970		Painted hardboard and pine	39.5 x 72.5 x 5 cm			
	Green Head	Private collection	1970		Irish green marble	27.1 cm high	BH 510		
	Theme and Variations	Cheltenham House, Cheltenham	1970		Bronze	3.4 x 7.6 m	BH 511		
	Maquette, Theme and Variations	Edition of six	1970		Silver on walnut wood	30.5 x 64.3 x 15.4 cm	BH 512A		
	Maquette, Theme and Variations	Edition of four: Roche Court Sculpture Park and Gallery	1970		Polished bronze	29.0 x 64.0 x 15.0 cm			
	Three Forms in Echelon	Museum Würth, Germany	1970		White marble		BH 516		
	Three Curves with Strings [Gold Mincarlo]	Edition of thirteen	1971		18 caret gold on stone base	16.2cm high plus base	BH 520		
	Three Forms	Edition of six	1971		Polished bronze		BH 521		Cast from a 1935 alabaster carving
	Three Round Forms	Private collection	1971		Delabole slate	35.2 cm wide	BH 527		
	Two Forms (Newborn)	Private collection	1971		White marble		BH 532		
	Solitary Form	Private collection	1971		White marble	64.7 cm high	BH 533		
	Sleeping Form	Private collection	1971		White marble	21.0 x 36.0 x 23.0 cm	BH 534		
	Two Rocks	Hepworth estate	1971		Irish black marble	116.8 cm high	BH 536		
	Bird Flight	Hepworth estate	1971		Slate	37.5 x 36.0 x 28.0 cm			
	Miniature Divided Circle	The Hepworth Wakefield	1971		Painted plaster	23.0 x 25.0 x 9.8 cm			
	Summer Dance	Harrison Sculpture Garden at University of Minnesota Landscape Arboretum	1972		Bronze	91.4 x 137.2 x 76.2 cm			
	Assembly of Sea Forms	Norton Simon Museum	1972		Nine white marble pieces on stainless steel base	108.0 x 182.9 x 182.9 cm	BH 555		
More images	Minoan Head	Fitzwilliam Museum	1972		White marble	71.0 cm tall			
	Oval with Two Forms	Edition of ten	1972		Polished bronze		BH 538		
	Head (Ra)	Edition of eight;- Art Gallery of South Australia	1972		Polished bronze	48.2 x 38.0 x 24.0 cm	BH 539		
	Child with Mother	Hepworth estate	1972		White marble		BH 544		
	Shaft and Circle	Private collection	1972		Irish marble		BH 546		
	Meditation	Aberdeen Art Gallery	1972		Irish marble	30.5 x 38.0 x 26.5 cm plus base			
	Static Forms	Private collection	1972		White marble	59.0 x 71.4 x 56.1 cm	BH 547		
	Constellation	The Box, Plymouth	1972		White marble on wooden base	52.0 x 49.5 x 31.0 cm	BH 553		
	Two Forms (Green & Green)	Norton Simon Museum	1972-73		Marble	27.9 x 21.0 x 16.5 cm			
	Solitary Stone	Edition of two: Roche Court Sculpture Park and Gallery	1973		Silver	8.3 x 12.7 x 11.5 cm			
	Rock Face	Tate	1973		Ancaster stone	109.7 x 64.0 x 25.5 cm	BH 560		
	Sphere	Shakespeare's Globe, London	1972				BH 561		
	Two Spheres in Orbit	Walker Art Gallery, Liverpool	1973		White marble		BH 562		
	Duo (Grey & White)	Norton Simon Museum	1973		Marble	50.8 x 23.5 x 14.0 and 35.6 x 15.2 x 21.6 cm			
More images	Conversation with Magic Stones	Scottish National Gallery of Modern Art, Barbara Hepworth Museum, Trinity University	1973		Bronze	Six forms between 282.0 cm to 80.0 cm in height	BH 567		Four complete sets were cast plus one set which sold as individual pieces.
	River Form	Edition of four:- Barbara Hepworth Museum	1973		Bronze	79.0 x 193.0 x 85.0	BH 568		Cast from BH 401 (1965)
	Lotus	Private collection	1973		White marble	77.5 cm high			
	Group of Three Magic Stones	Edition of six;- Kettle's Yard	1973		Silver and ebony	12.0 x 37.0 x 31.6 cm	BH 569		Also known as "Group of Three Magic Forms"
	Cone and Sphere	Hepworth estate	1973		White marble	109.0 x 50.0 x 38.0 cm	BH 571		
	Shaft and Circle	Edition of eight:- Barbara Hepworth Museum, Hessisches Landesmuseum Darmstadt	1973		Polished bronze	121.9 x 47.2 x 50.5 cm	BH 572		Cast from BH 546 (1972)
	Maquette for Conversation with Magic Stones	Edition of ten	1974		Bronze	30.1 cm high	BH 575		
	Birds on a Roof	Dallas Museum of Art	1974		Marble and slate	29.85 x 46.99 x 32.39 cm			
	Fallen Images	Tate	1974-75		Six white marble forms on a wooden base	121.9 x 130.2 x 130.2 cm	BH 574		
	Small One, Two, Three (Vertical)	Private collection	1975		White marble		BH 579		

== The Family of Man ==
Image	Title / subject	Location and coordinates	Date	Type	Material	Dimensions	Designation	Wikidata	Notes
More images	The Family of Man	Edition of two: Yorkshire Sculpture Park	1970		Bronze in nine parts	300 cm to 171.5 cm high	BH 513		Two complete groups of nine were made plus four casts of each individual figure.
	The Family of Man: Young Girl	Edition of four; The Hepworth Wakefield, Hawaiʻi State Library	1970-73		Bronze		BH 513		
	The Family of Man: Youth	Edition of four;	1970		Bronze	203.8 cm high	BH 513		
	The Family of Man: The Bride	Edition of four;- Art Institute of Chicago	1970		Bronze	240 x 55.9 x 30.5 cm	BH 513h		
	The Family of Man: Bridegroom	Edition of four; Los Angeles County Museum of Art, San Francisco Museum of Modern Art	1970		Bronze	281.4 x 91.4 x 50.8 cm	BH 513		
	The Family of Man: Parent I	Edition of four; Snape Maltings, The Hepworth Wakefield, Fitzwilliam Museum, Hawaiʻi State Library	1970-73		Bronze	267 cm high	BH 513		
	The Family of Man: Parent II	Edition of four; The Hepworth Wakefield	1970-74		Bronze	238.8 cm high	BH 513e		
More images	The Family of Man: Ancestor I	Edition of four; Snape Maltings, Fitzwilliam Museum, University of Birmingham	1970		Bronze	277 cm high	BH 513		
	The Family of Man: Ancestor II	Edition of four; Snape Maltings, Fitzwilliam Museum, Columbus Museum of Art	1970-74		Bronze	272 cm high	BH 513b		
	The Family of Man: Ultimate Form	Edition of four; Adelaide Festival Centre	1971		Bronze	300.0 x 120.0 x 56.0 cm	BH 513		
