= Two Faces =

Two Faces or The Two Faces may refer to:

== Arts, entertainment and media ==
- "The Two Faces" (story), a 1900 story by Henry James
- Two Faces, a 1969 sculpture by Barbara Hepworth
- Two Faces, a 1970 painting by Zainul Abedin
- Two Faces, a 1973 work by Hermine Freed
- Two Faces, a 2000 ballet by Hans van Manen
- Two Faces, a 2016 exhibition by Darin Ahmad

=== Books ===
- Two Faces, 1961, by Ivan Ângelo
- Two Faces, 1996, by Ken Marcus
- Two Faces, 2016, by Manon Steffan Ros

=== Film and television ===
- The Two Faces, a 1987 Finnish animated short film
- Two Faces (film), a 1999 Hong Kong film directed by Billy Chung
- Two Faces (telenovela), a Brazilian telenovela that aired from 2007 to 2008
- "Two Faces", a 2019 episode of Trap
- "Two Faces", a 2024 episode of Lavender Fields

=== Music ===
==== Albums ====
- Two Faces, 1980, by Carita Holmström
- Two Faces, 1999, a demo by Carbonized
- Two Faces, 1991, by Rainbirds
- Two Faces, 2006, by Brian Campeau
- Two Faces, 2014, by Pueblo Criminal

=== Songs ===
- "Two Faces", 1986, from Juice by Oran "Juice" Jones
- "Two Faces", 1987, from Numb by Numb
- "Two Faces", 1987, from Tunnel of Love by Bruce Springsteen
- "Two Faces", 1991, from Two Faces by Rainbirds
- "Two Faces", 1999, from Varsity Blues: Music from and Inspired by the Motion Picture by Days of the New
- "Two Faces", 2007, from One, Two... Five by Orthodox Celts
- "Two Faces", 2010, from Butterfly House by the Coral
- "Two Faces", 2017, by Michèle and a candidate in ESC 2017 – die Entscheidungsshow

== See also ==
- Doubleface (disambiguation)
- Two-faced (disambiguation)
- Two-Face, a comic book supervillain
