= Sphere with Inner Form =

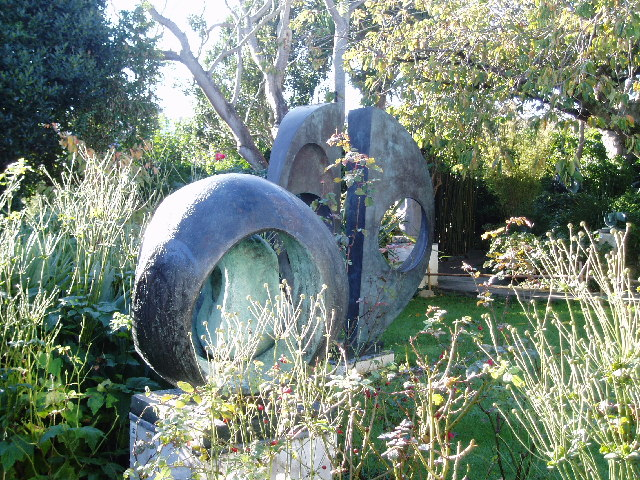
Sphere with Inner Form at the Barbara Hepworth Museum in St Ives, Cornwall, with Two Forms (Divided Circle) behind

Sphere with Inner Form (BH 333) is a bronze sculpture by English artist Barbara Hepworth, with six castings made in 1963 and two more 1965. It is sometimes interpreted as a child in a pregnant woman's womb, or as a metaphor for the creation of a sculpture.

The sculpture is on one of Hepworth's favourite themes, enclosure of space. The work has a smooth spherical bronze shell resting on a square bronze base, with three large rounded openings presenting a view of an irregular pierced bronze shape enclosed within. The brown polished outer surface of the sphere contrasts with the greenish patina inside. Hepworth said in her autobiography "There is an inside and outside to every form ... a nut in its shell or of a child in the womb".

Hepworth first carved a plaster form on an aluminium armature to create a mould for the sculpture. Six copies were cast at the Art Bronze Foundry in London in 1963, with an additional seventh copy for sale and one for the artist herself made in 1965. The outer shell was cast in pieces, with a welded joint over the top, and another weld to connect the sphere to the base. The spherical element measures 90.0×90.0×88.5 centimetres (35.4×35.4×34.8 in) standing on a square bronze base which measures 7.5×59.5×59.5 centimetres (3.0×23.4×23.4 in).

Hepworth donated a one copy of the work (cast 6/7) to an auction for the benefit of the Institute of Contemporary Arts in 1966. Hepworth's executors donated the artist's copy (cast 0/7) to the Tate Gallery 1980, in accordance with Hepworth's wishes. It is exhibited at the Barbara Hepworth Museum in St Ives, Cornwall. Other examples are exhibited at the Kröller-Müller Museum in Otterlo in the Netherlands (cast 4/7) and the Whitworth Art Gallery in Manchester (cast 7/7).

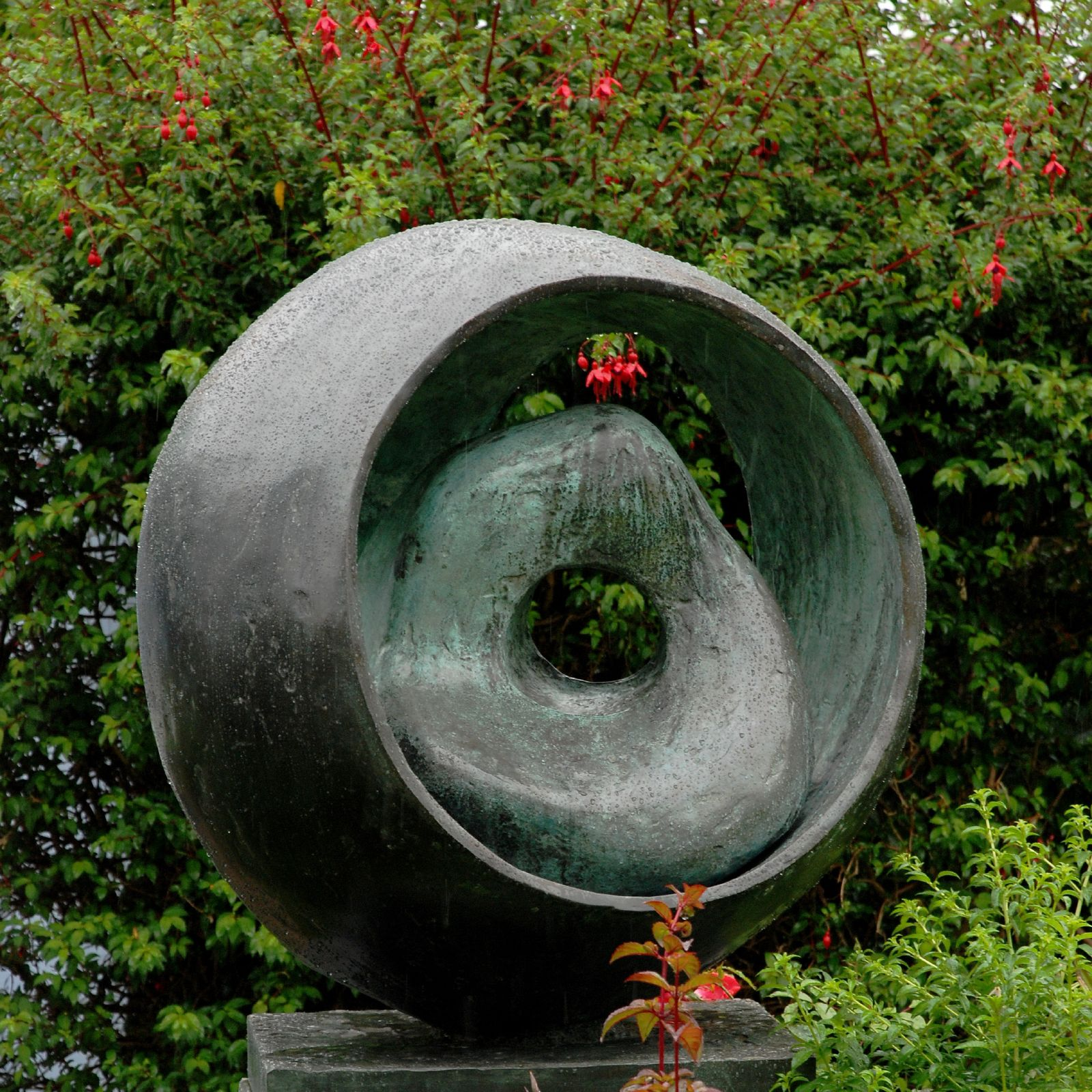
Barbara Hepworth Museum, St Ives, Cornwall

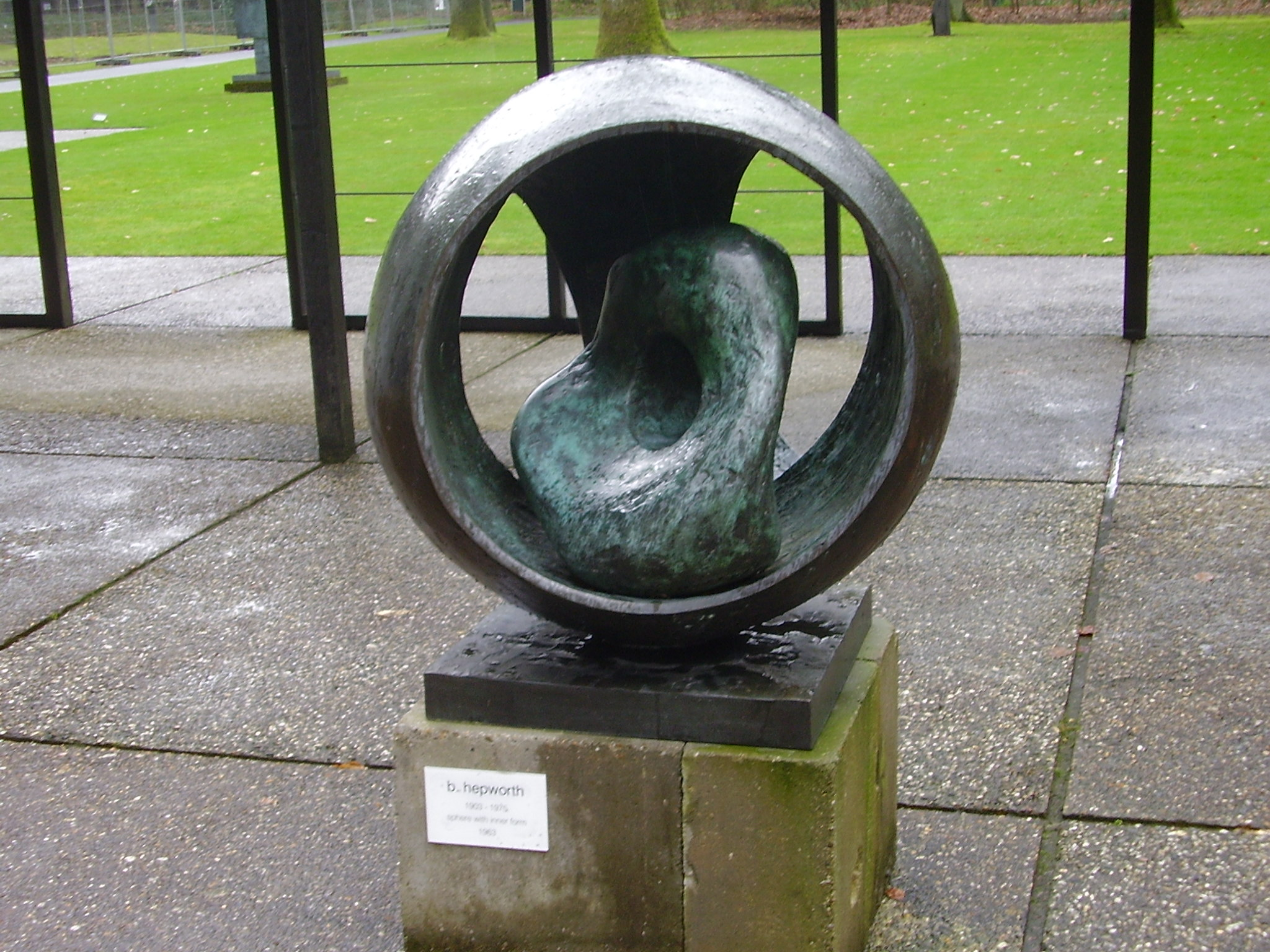
Kröller-Müller Museum, Otterlo, Netherlands

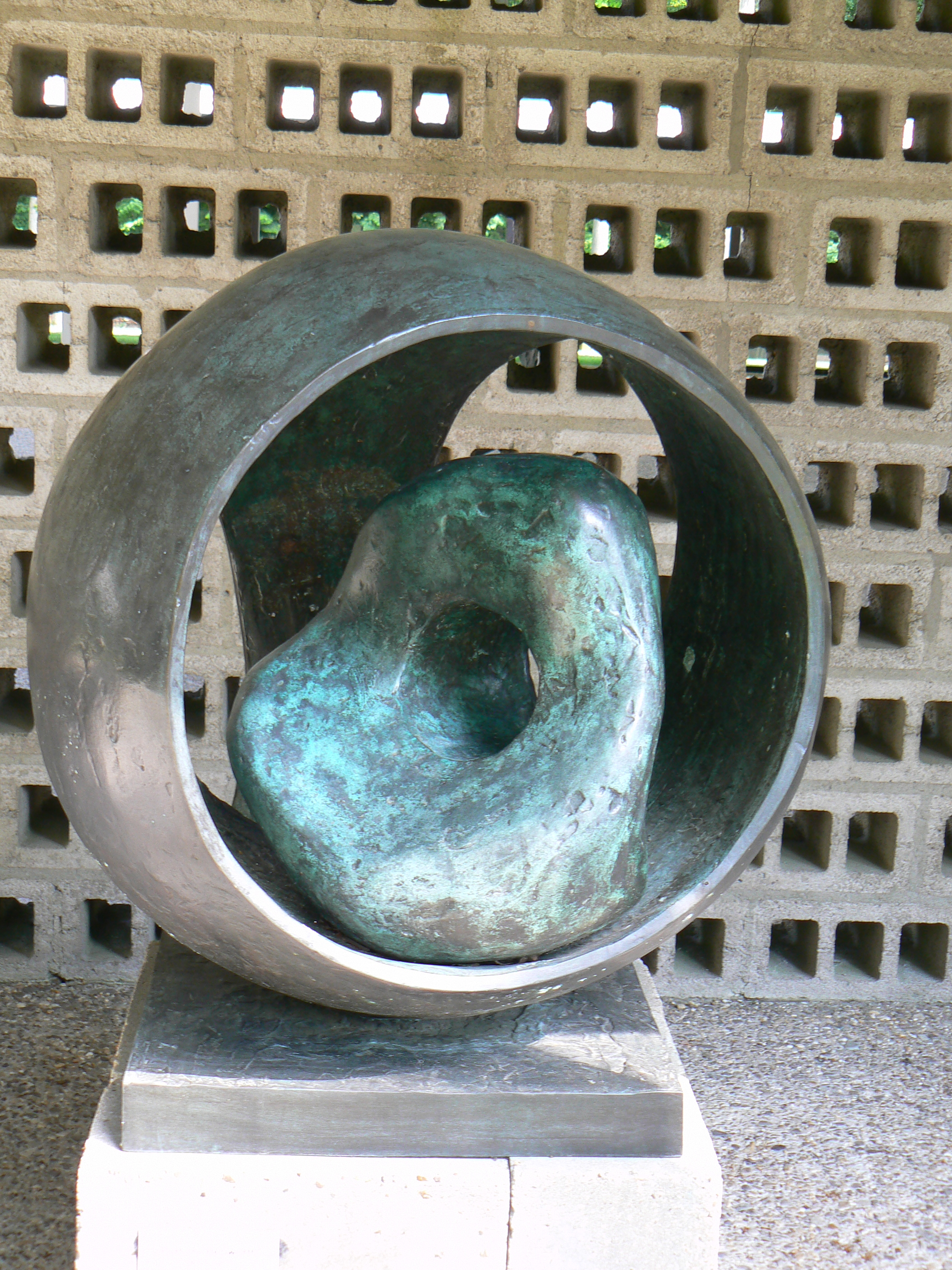
KMM Sculpturepark, Netherlands
