= Doubleface =

Doubleface, Double-faced, and similar, may refer to:

- Double Faced (TV series), a 2015 Philippine televised melodrama
- Double Face (film), a 1969 Italian thriller
- The Double Face (film), a 1920 German silent film
- "Doublefaced" (song), a 2016 'In Strict Confidence' song off the album The Hardest Heart
- "Doubleface" (song), a 1996 'Bob Mould' song off the eponymous album Bob Mould (album)
- "Double Faces" (single), a 2023 'Nav' single; see Nav discography
- The Doubleface (character), a fictional character from Psychic Squad
- Doubleface (character), a fictional character from Masked Rider; see List of Masked Rider episodes
- Two-faced person or double-faced person

== See also ==
- Two-faced (disambiguation)
- Double (disambiguation)
- Face (disambiguation)
- Two Faces (disambiguation)
