= Barbara Hepworth Museum =

Sculpture museum in Cornwall, England

Coordinates: 50°12′49″N 5°28′53″W

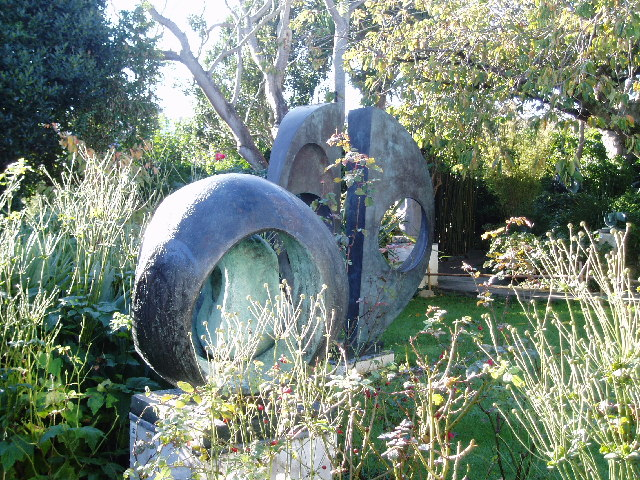
Sphere with Inner Form at the Barbara Hepworth Museum, with Two Forms (Divided Circle) behind

The Barbara Hepworth Museum and Sculpture Garden in St Ives, Cornwall preserves the 20th-century sculptor Barbara Hepworth's studio and garden much as they were when she lived and worked there. She purchased the site in 1949 and lived and worked there for 26 years until her death in a fire on the premises in 1975.

== History ==
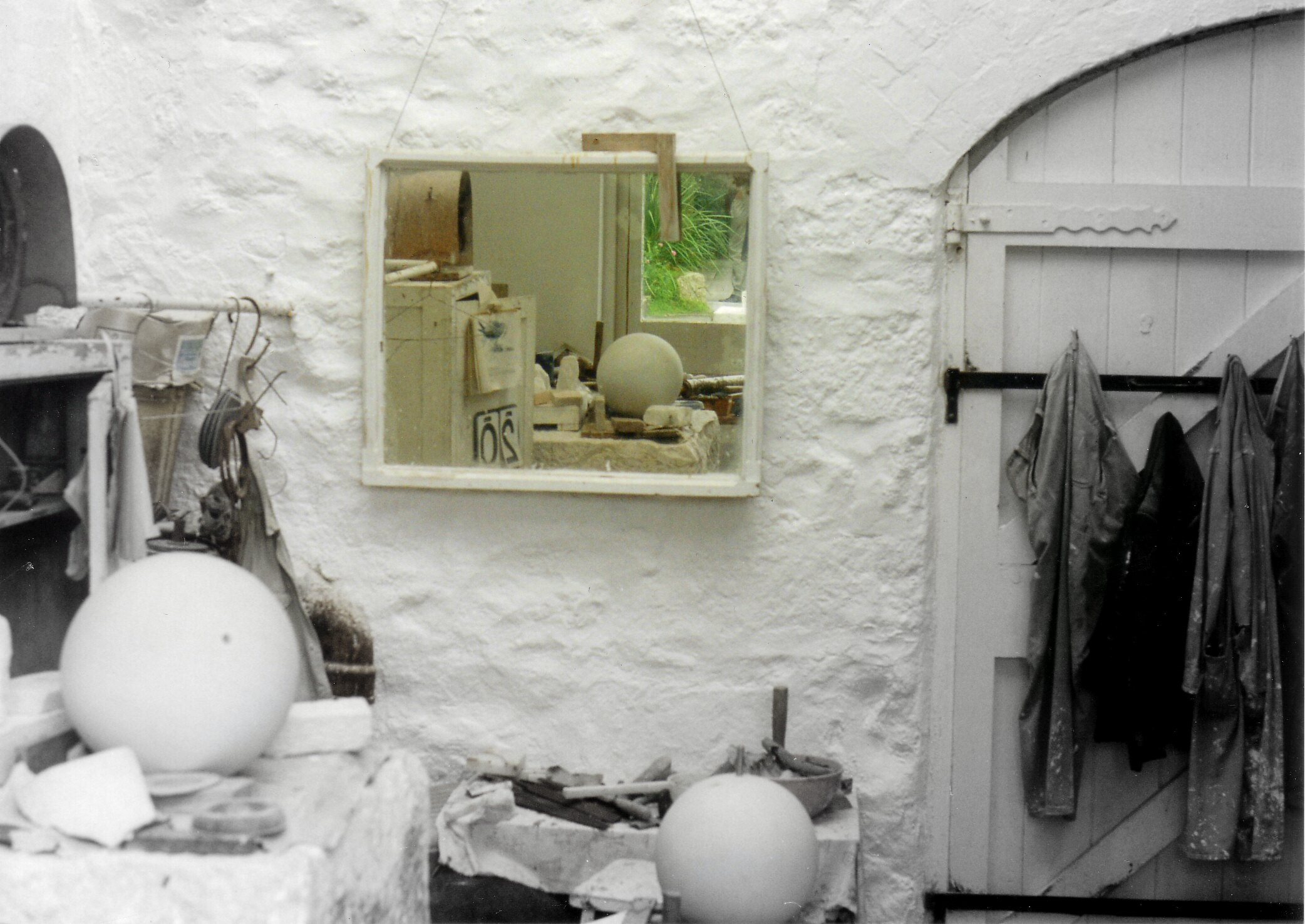
Hepworth's workshop left virtually untouched

The studio, known as Trewyn Studio, was purchased by Barbara Hepworth in September 1949. Princess Anne visited Hepworth at her studio during her visit to St Ives in 1972.

Her living room is furnished as she left it, while the workshop remains full of her tools and equipment, materials, and part-worked pieces. The museum was opened by her family in 1976, after Hepworth had left instructions to this effect in her will. It is the largest collection of her works that are on permanent display.

The sculptures featured at the museum (mainly in the secluded garden) were some of her favourites. Her workshop also includes a queue of uncut stones that one visitor has described as "still waiting for their moment in the shadow of her workshop". In 1950 she acquired two huge blocks of Galway limestone which she carved into her Festival of Britain commission, the Contrapuntal Forms. A set of photographs in the museum shows the progress of this project. Wood carving was done in an upstairs room, and the bronze statues she started casting in 1956 had their origins in the plaster prototypes she worked on in the upper of the two outside studios.

She was helped in the creation of the garden by her friend, the South African-born composer Priaulx Rainier.

Barbara Hepworth died in a fire at this site in 1975, which was caused by one of her cigarettes making some package burn, when she was aged 72.

The family passed the museum to the Tate gallery in 1980 and they still manage it.

== Books ==
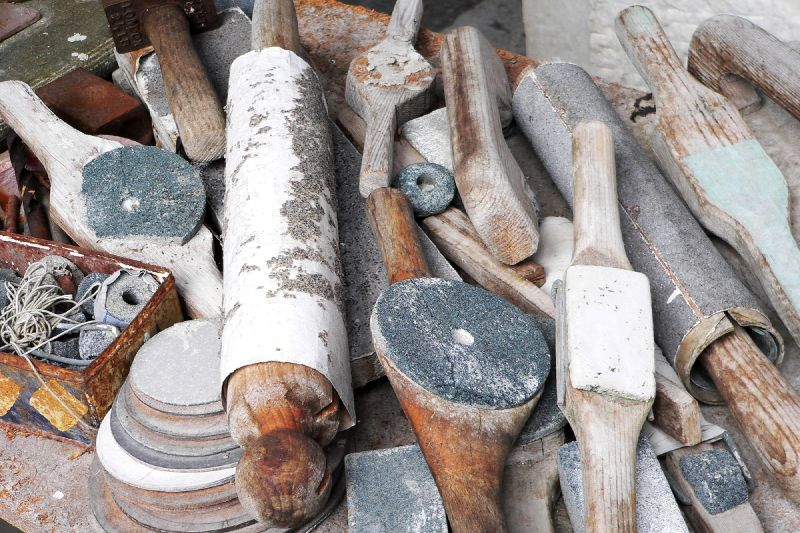
Close up of Hepworth's tools, in the workshop

- The Barbara Hepworth Sculpture Garden by Miranda Phillips and Chris Stephens. Tate Publishing, 2002. ISBN 1-85437-412-5.

== See also ==
- The Hepworth Wakefield
- List of St Ives artists
- Tate St Ives
- List of single-artist museums
