= Dual Form (Hepworth) =

Bronze sculpture by Barbara Hepworth

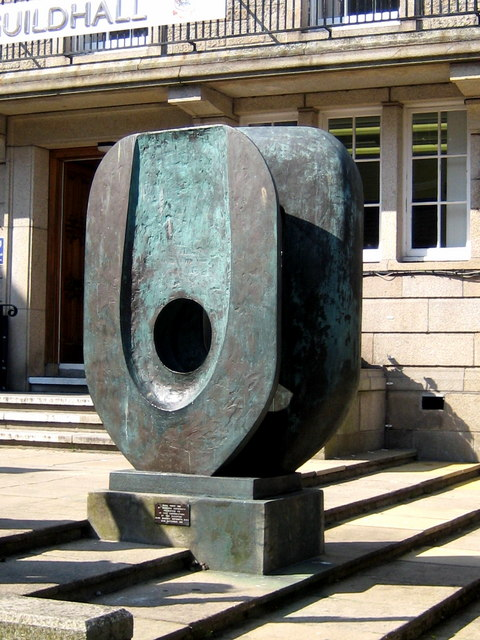
- Outside St Ives Guildhall
- Artist: Barbara Hepworth
- Year: 1965
- Catalogue: BH 396
- Medium: Bronze sculpture
- Dimensions: 192 cm × 142 cm × 66 cm (76 in × 56 in × 26 in)
- Location: St Ives Guildhall; Leeds Art Gallery; Lancaster University Peter Scott Gallery; Kröller-Müller Museum, Otterlo; The Phillips Collection, Washington DC; Portland Art Museum, Portland, Oregon
- Accession: 70.21
- Preceded by: Three forms (family group)
- Followed by: Maquette for Dual Form

Dual Form (BH 396) is a bronze sculpture by the British artist Barbara Hepworth.

Created in 1965, it was cast in an edition of 7+1 (seven casts plus one artist's copy) at the Morris Singer foundry. The full-size version measures 192 cm × 142 cm × 66 cm (76 in × 56 in × 26 in). It includes two large flattened oval shapes, each with a recessed area, and pierced by a hole, one with a round hole and the other hole elongated.

There is also a 19-inch bronze maquette (BH 397) which was cast in an edition of 9 plus an artist's copy.

An example of the full-size sculpture has usually been sited outside the St Ives Guildhall in Cornwall since 1966, but in 2024 it was temporarily moved to Kresen Kernow in Redruth while the area around the Guildhall is renovated. Another full-size cast was bought by Leeds City Art Gallery in 1967, on loan to Leeds University since 2016. Other casts are at the Peter Scott Gallery at Lancaster University, the Kröller-Müller Museum at Otterlo in the Netherlands, at The Phillips Collection in Washington DC (which also holds a maquette), and the Portland Art Museum in Portland, Oregon.

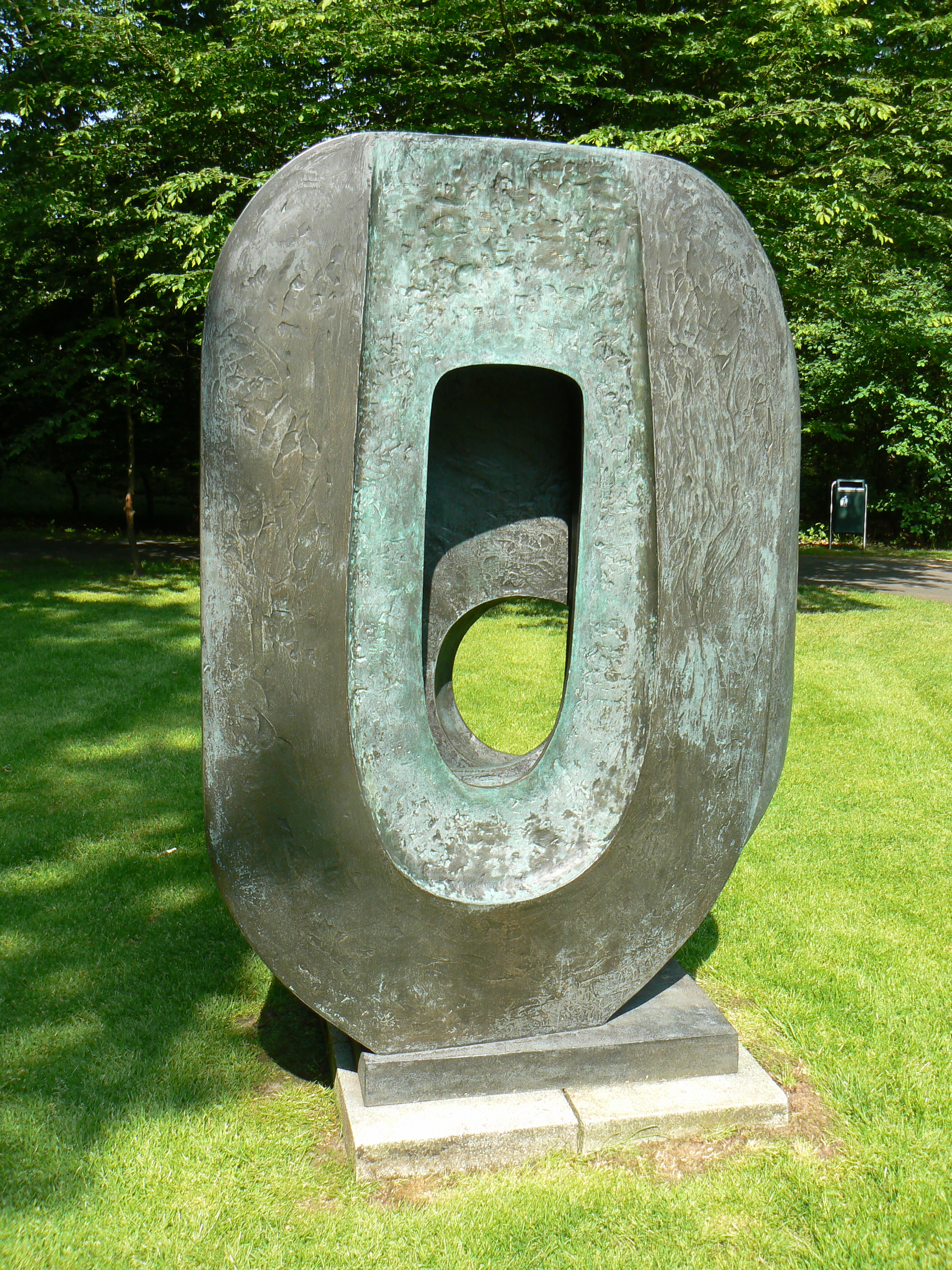
At the Kröller-Müller Museum
