= Two-faced =

Two-faced, Two-Faced, or Two-Face may refer to:

- Diprosopus or two-faced, a congenital disorder
- Two-Face, a character in DC comics

== Music ==
- Two-Faced, a 1994 album by Tankard
- Two Faced (album), a 1998 album by Burst

=== Songs ===
- "2 Faced", 2000, by Louise
- "Two Faced" (song), 2024, by Linkin Park from the album From Zero
- "Two Face" (YNW Melly song), 2019
- "Two Face" (Nav song), 2020

== Television ==
- "Two-Face", a 1992 episode of Batman: The Animated Series
- "Two Faced", a 2013 episode of Baggage Battles
- "Two-Faced", a 2019 episode of Blue Bloods season 9
- "Two-Faced", a 2023 episode of Dirty Linen
- "Two-Faced", a 2016 episode of Halloween Wars
- "Two Faced", a 1953 episode of Mr. and Mrs. North
- "Two-Faced", a 2011 episode of NCIS season 8
- "Two Faced", a 2021 episode of Painted with Raven season 1
- "Hyōri" (表裏, Two-faced), a 2016 episode of Sanadu Maru
- "Two Faced", a 2004 episode of Silversun
- "Two Faced", a 1953 episode of Tales of Tomorrow
- "Two Faced", a 1997 episode of The Mystery Files of Shelby Woo

== See also ==
- Doubleface
- Hypocrisy
- True self and false self
- Two Faces (disambiguation)
