= Pelagos (Hepworth) =

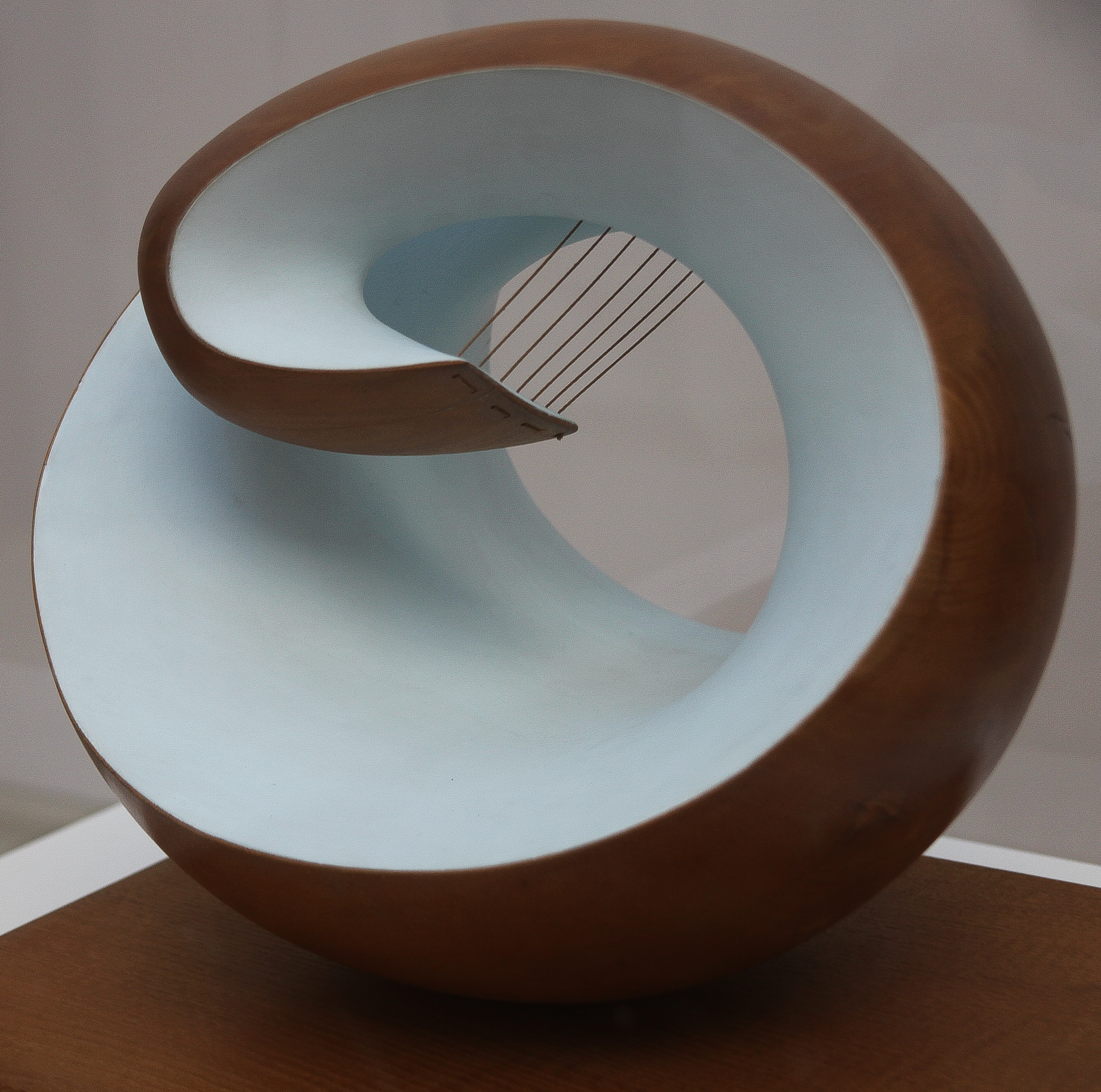
Pelagos

Pelagos (BH 133) is a sculpture by British artist Barbara Hepworth, made in 1946 from elm wood with strings, mounted on a square oak base. It measures 43 cm × 46 cm × 38.5 cm (16.9 in × 18.1 in × 15.2 in) and weighs about 15.2 kg (34 lb). It has been held by the Tate gallery since 1964.

The work and its title, Pelagos (Greek for "sea"), was inspired by a sea view from Hepworth's home at Carbis Bay in Cornwall, with the arms of land reaching out into the sea on either side of the bay. Hepworth had moved to St Ives with her husband Ben Nicholson and their five year old triplets in 1939. Similar to her 1943-44 sculpture Wave (BH 122), Pelagos has a rounded form, with outer surfaces of smooth polished wood, inner surfaces painted a matt pale blue, and parts linked by taut strings. Pelagos is ovoid, carved into a hollow spiral with two curving arms, like a shell or a wave, linked by parallel strings. It has been viewed as a culmination of her work to 1946, integrating a natural form and material with strings influenced by Constructivism.

The sculpture was first exhibited at the Lefevre Gallery in London in 1946, with a photograph chosen for the front cover of The Studio in October 1946. It was also included in the British pavilion at the 25th Venice Biennale in 1950. It was included in retrospective exhibitions of Hepworth's works at the Whitechapel Art Gallery in 1954 and 1962, at the Tate gallery in London in 1968, and an exhibition at Tate Liverpool in 1994 and then at the Yale Center for British Art and then the Art Gallery of Ontario in 1995.

Hepworth sold the sculpture in 1946 to Duncan MacDonald, a director of the Lefevre Gallery. It was inherited by his widow, Lily MacDonald. Hepworth bought it back in 1958, and donated it to the Tate gallery in 1964.
