= Square Forms and Circles =

Bronze sculpture by Barbara Hepworth

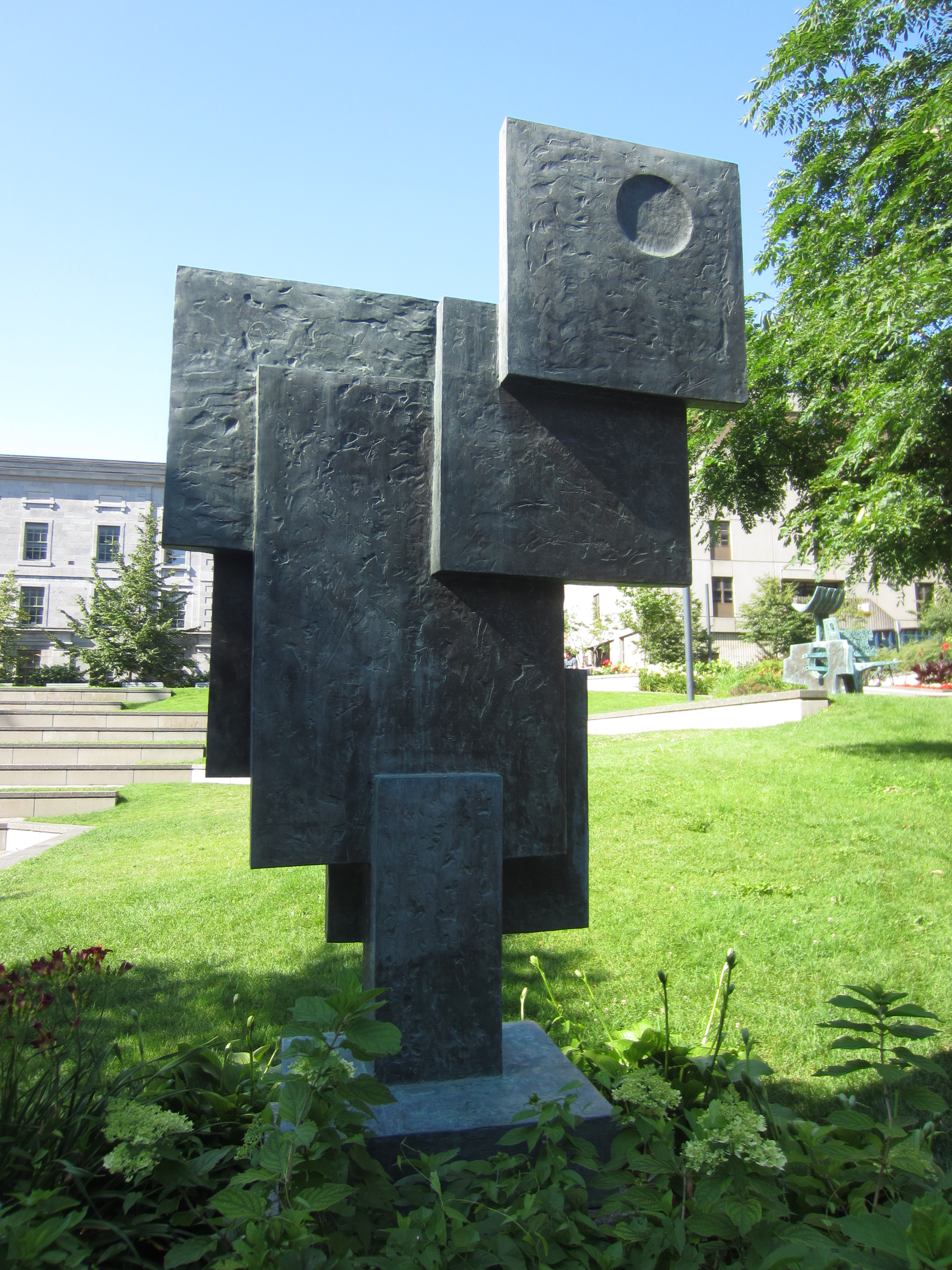
- The sculpture at McGill University in Montreal in 2017
- Artist: Barbara Hepworth
- Year: 1963
- Medium: Sculpture
- Location: Montreal, Quebec, Canada; 45°30′22″N 73°34′37″W

Square Forms and Circles (BH 326) is a large bronze sculpture by Barbara Hepworth, made in 1963 in an edition of seven (six plus an artist's copy).

Standing approximately 2.5 m (8 ft 2 in) high, it comprises several flat bronze plates that are riveted or jointed together, all with a rough surface treatment and greenish patina. There are five squares attached to a central rectangle which is about 1.5 times the size of the square, supported by a thicker rectangular column about half the size of a square, which is attached to a square base. Two of the uppermost square elements bear incised or recessed circular features. This sculpture resembles Hepworth's much smaller Square Forms (BH 313), made in an edition of nine in 1962, which is approximately 13 in (33 cm) high, about an eighth the size. The combination of flat panels more closely recalls the works of Hepworth's husband Ben Nicholson than the organic forms more typical of Hepworth's work.

Several examples are held in public collections. One example was bought by John G. McConnell of the Montreal Star newspaper, and donated to Montreal's McGill University, in Quebec, Canada, where it is displayed outdoors on the university campus. Another copy was sold via Gimpel Fils to Mr and Mrs Clark of Dallas in 1965. It was donated by Lillian Clark to the City of Dallas public art collection, and is displayed at the J. Erik Jonsson Central Library. A third copy was donated by Hepworth in 1967 to the Israel Museum in Jerusalem. A fourth was donated by the Ralph E. Ogden Foundation to the Storm King Art Center in New Windsor, New York.
