= List of Masked Rider episodes =

The following is a list of episodes for the television series Masked Rider.

== List of episodes ==
No.	Title	Directed by	Written by	Original release date
1	"Escape from Edenoi"	Shuki Levy	Shuki Levy & Shell Danielson	September 16, 1995
2	"Escape from Edenoi"	Shuki Levy	Shuki Levy & Shell Danielson	September 16, 1995
On the planet of Edenoi, King Lexian grants his grandson Dex the Masked Rider powers before sending him to Earth in a meteor. Upon arrival, Dex's meteor lands in the backyard of the residence of the Stewart family in the city of Leawood. After Dex explains his origins to the Stewarts and why he needs to fit in with the humans on Earth, Count Dregon—the series' main antagonist—sends an Insectovore called Destructosphere to destroy the city at dawn. In response to Destructosphere's attack, Dex transforms into Masked Rider and prepares for battle. Dex narrowly escapes defeat at the hands of Destructosphere, and is advised by his grandfather, King Lexian, to create new allies for himself, resulting in the births of Combat Chopper and Magno. But later, Masked Rider and his new allies must battle a trio of Count Dregon's Maggots when they are unleashed upon Leawood High School, as well as the Insectovore Beetletron. NOTE: The VHS version of this episode features a fight scene that is not present in the televised one.
3	"License to Thrill"	Worth Keeter	Joseph Kuhr	September 23, 1995
Dex goes to school with the Stewart children while Nefaria comes up with a plan for Count Dregon. Meanwhile, Ferbus stows away in a school bag and Dex shares some thoughts with his classmates. Count Dregon sends his Maggots to Leawood High while the Insectovore Larvatron impersonates Mr. Li.
4	"Pet Nappers"	Worth Keeter	Clifford Herbert	September 30, 1995
The Stewart family prepare for attack. Count Dregon sends Nefaria to recruit a couple of burglars and the Insectovore Mandible. Now, Ferbus is in danger of being kidnapped.
5	"Bugs on the Loose"	Worth Keeter	Peter Meech	October 7, 1995
While out on a bug hunt, Hal and Albee encounter an Insectivore named Mothitron, who attempts to transform them into Insect Soldiers loyal to Count Dregon. Masked Rider must defeat Mothitron as well as discover an antidote for Hal and Albee's growing mutation.
6	"Arcade Ace"	David Frost	Jane Macintosh	October 14, 1995
Albee is challenged by a bully to a video game play-off, but his reluctance ultimately has Dex filling in for him. Meanwhile, Count Dregon unleashes an Insectovore named Crimson Creeper to battle Masked Rider.
7	"Super Gold"	David Frost	Mark Litton	October 28, 1995
8	"Super Gold"	David Frost	Mark Litton	November 4, 1995
Dex's friend Donais comes to Earth on a mission to upgrade the Masked Rider powers to Super Gold, but Count Dregon kidnaps Donais and uses his own crystal to turn Donais into the evil Robo Rider. Dex is able to turn Robo Rider back into Donais, who offers him the upgrade crystal. Masked Rider then uses his new Super Gold form to defeat the Edentata, a creature that preys on Edenoites. NOTE: The VHS version of this episode features a flashback scene referencing the three part Mighty Morphin Power Rangers crossover "A Friend in Need" that is not present in the televised one.
9	"The Grandma Factor"	Worth Keeter	Peter Meech	November 11, 1995
Grandma Stewart drops by for a visit. Meanwhile, Count Dregon sends his own visitors, who kidnap Grandma (although Molly and Albee were the intended targets). Dex must save Grandma while partaking in two different battles against the Insectovores Termasect (who was accidentally sent down by Grandma) and Slimeasect.
10	"Something's Trashy"	Worth Keeter	Clifford Herbert	November 18, 1995
The Stewart children start a clean-up campaign in Leawood. This gives Cyclopter an idea for another evil Insectovore monster; he revives a previous robotic monster called Cyclotron into Recyclotron, an Insectovore that can control every electronic appliance.
11	"Water Water Everywhere"	Worth Keeter	Joseph Kuhr	November 25, 1995
After Hal and Barbara see Dex stay up all night watching television, they choose to engage in outdoor recreation by taking the whole family to their local community swimming pool. Count Dregon, however, sets in motion the release of green colored gas into the atmosphere and has the operation guarded by the Insectovore Firebug. While the green gas is not intended to affect Dex, it controls the minds of everybody else at the pool and turns them into a mob against him. After destroying Firebug, Dex destroys the controls for the gas.
12	"Ferbus' First Christmas"	Worth Keeter	Margo McCahon	December 23, 1995
Dex and Ferbus learn about the traditions of Christmas on Earth when the holiday is upon Leawood, while also saving Santa Claus from Count Dregon's Maggots.
13	"Stranger from the North"	Worth Keeter	Clifford Herbert	January 27, 1996
A foreign exchange student named Bjorgy visits Leawood High School, and Dex and Molly invite Bjorgy to the Stewarts family for one week. During Bjorgy's stay, Count Dregon's commandoids kidnap Bjorgy (mistaking him for Dex) and take him to the Insectovore Hydrasect. Molly and Albee tell Dex of the incident and Dex transforms into Masked Rider and goes to fight Hydrasect. After Dex defeats Hydrasect in its Arachnida form, Bjorgy returns to his home country, leaving the Stewart family a present of his nation's sing-along songs.
14	"Dance Crazy"	Rob Malenfant	Margo McCahon	February 3, 1996
The Stewart children catch dance fever. Meanwhile, Count Dregon plans to defeat the Masked Rider with an all-new Insectovore called Robosect. While the dancers compete for a big prize, Count Dregon has a big surprise for Masked Rider.
15	"The Green-Eyed Monster"	Rob Malenfant	Kati Rocky	February 10, 1996
The Stewart children enjoy a day of dirt bike racing and Ferbus enjoys a few treats. Then, Ferbus is left behind and Dex goes looking for him. But, Count Dregon has a surprise for Masked Rider involving the Skull Reapers.
16	"The Heat Is On"	Worth Keeter	Michael Ryan	February 17, 1996
Count Dregon dispatches the Insectovore Heliotoid to unleash a heat wave upon Leawood to lure Masked Rider out into the open. Masked Rider must defeat this new threat and also save Ferbus, who begins to grow dangerously sick from the intense heat.
17	"Know Your Neighbour"	Worth Keeter	Mark Litton	February 24, 1996
The Stewarts become contestants on a hit TV show. Count Dregon sends Maggots to the studio to stop the show. Masked Rider must stop the Maggots while also contending with the Insectovore Electrosect.
18	"The Dash"	Worth Keeter	Mark Litton	February 24, 1996
Dex is running a little late while Principal Chalmers and the Coach discuss the state track championship. Then Dex zooms by. Count Dregon has an evil plan involving the Insectovore Tentaclon.
19	"Battle of the Bands"	Rob Malenfant	Diane Sherlock	April 27, 1996
The Stewart children get ready for the big Battle of the Bands competition. The Insectovore Blue-Fanged Louse is sent to wreak havoc on Leawood.
20	"Ferbus Maximus"	Rob Malenfant	Jane Macintosh	May 4, 1996
After a dubial showdown between Cyclopter and the Masked Rider, Count Dregon considers Nefaria's next evil plan. When Ferbus takes a bite, strange things begin to happen. This evil spell on Ferbus must be reversed by Dex as he also contends with Cyclopter and his Cannon Wheels motorcycle as well as the Insectovore Cyborsect.
21	"Unmasked Rider"	Rob Malenfant	Jane Macintosh	June 15, 1996
Patsy Carbunkle begins to get too close to discovering the truth about the Stewarts. Meanwhile, Donais returns to Earth to upgrade the Masked Rider powers once more. Dex must use his new Super Blue mode to defeat Dregon's newest Insectovore Tripron.
22	"Ferbus' Day Out"	Rob Malenfant	Margo McCahon	June 22, 1996
While the Stewarts go out to a restaurant to celebrate Hal and Barbara's wedding anniversary, Ferbus ends up going on an adventure of his own, nearly endangering the family's cover when he is caught by the local pound. Meanwhile, Masked Rider finds himself facing off against Double Face, who has been empowered with a weapon called the Super Sword, and the Insectovore Turtletron.
23	"Jobless"	Rob Malenfant	Jane Macintosh	June 29, 1996
Dex seeks gainful employment. The job search is tough until he lands a gig at the arcade. But Count Dregon enacts a scheme to stop the new employee involving the Insectovore Liquisect.
24	"Back to Nature"	Rob Malenfant	Joseph Kuhr	July 6, 1996
The family goes camping at Molly's suggestion and Count Dregon uses the opportunity to launch an attack. The Insectovore Water Bug is sent to attempt to blow up Leawood Bay Bridge to lure Dex into a trap. Meanwhile, a scientist in the woods catches Ferbus thinking he is a baby Sasquatch.
25	"Testing 1, 2, 3"	Worth Keeter	Clifford Herbert	July 13, 1996
Nefaria sets into a motion a scheme to ruin Masked Rider's secret identity by tricking Principal Henry Chalmers into studying Dex's homelife, to determine what makes him such an exceptional student. When his repeated testing fails to expose Dex, Dregon sends down Gork and the Insectovore Fleazoid to attack the city.
26	"Showdown at Leawood High"	Rob Malenfant	Margo McCahon	July 20, 1996
Dex and a school nerd are tormented by the local school bully, who challenges them to a fight after school. To make matters worse, Masked Rider must protect Leawood from the Insectovore Twister Bug before he sends the city flying off into oblivion.
27	"Power Out"	Rob Malenfant	Mark Litton	July 27, 1996
An explosion in Leawood Canyon leads Dex into a trap, where the Insectovore Boulder Beetle begins to sap the Masked Rider powers out of him via negative proton rays as part of Nefaria's plan. Double Face is also prepared for the event that Nefaria's plan fails and has a War Saber and the Insectovore Reptosect monster waiting for him to make use of. Dex must find a way to regain his powers and defeat his opponents before he misses Albee's recital.
28	"Saturday Morning Invasion"	Worth Keeter	Jane Macintosh	September 9, 1996
Count Dregon discovers alien competition and abducts the alien when he finds out that it can enlarge things.
29	"Passenger Ferbus"	Worth Keeter	Jane Macintosh	September 10, 1996
It is Grandma Stewart's 75th birthday and she has sent Dex's family airline tickets to come celebrate with her. Once he is aboard the plane, Dex will not be able to leave without revealing his identity. Count Dregon sends down the Insectivore Solarsect to enslave the Earthlings.
30	"Mixed Doubles"	Worth Keeter	Steve Sessions	September 11, 1996
Count Dregon's plan to defeat Masked Rider includes cloning the entire Stewart Family and then cloning himself which creates the Dregonator.
31	"Million Dollar Ferbus"	Worth Keeter	Margo McCahon	September 16, 1996
Albee enters his name and that of Ferbus in a Million Dollar Sweepstakes, but both of them are shocked when Ferbus actually wins—not to mention that they learn both of them are too young to have even entered. Meanwhile, Masked Rider must battle against Lavasect when Count Dregon frees him from his imprisonment. Because of the threat of Lavasect, Count Dregon hopes that Dex will win before Lavasect comes for him next.
32	"Ectophase Albee"	Worth Keeter	Jane Macintosh	September 17, 1996
A family game of baseball has unexpected results when Albee finds he suddenly has the powers of Masked Rider transferred to him after the ball collides with him and Dex. Now, Albee must battle Count Dregon's Insectovores Manosect, Dread Dragon, and Cyborgator when Count Dregon discover the sudden change. In the end, this entire adventure is discovered to be a dream that Albee had, because, in reality, he was hit by the baseball, which caused him to black out.
33	"Race Against Time"	Rob Malenfant	Joseph Kuhr	September 26, 1996
Count Dregon gives Albee a present, a car that cannot lose which is actually a disguise of the Insectovore Revenator. He leads Dregon's forces to Dex's cave, where they plan to destroy Magno and Chopper.
34	"Cat-Atomic"	Terence Winkless	Steve Sessions	October 14, 1996
Cheerleading tryouts are coming up and Molly is unsure about trying out. After testing a new invention that turned a vampire bat into the Insectovore Parasect, Count Dregon wants to transform the Leawood Lions mascot outfit into the tiger-like Insectovore Catatron.
35	"Indigestion"	Rob Malenfant	Glen A.May	October 21, 1996
In a desperate attempt to claim the Masked Rider powers, Count Dregon uses a special toxin to poison Dex's school lunch, and Dex has nightmares about being defeated by Dregon's Insectivores afterwards. Ferbus must call King Lexian from Edenoi to heal Dex. After King Lexian helps Dex to recover, Masked Rider must defeat the Insectovores Spearasect and Space Monkey.
36	"Dex at Bat"	Rob Malenfant	Clifford Herbert	October 31, 1996
A banana and a monster become the key to a mystery. Masked Rider must brave a haunted house and the Insectovore Bananatex. Count Dregon gives the Stewarts a big, hairy problem when he turns the bat Fluffy that Albee is watching for a friend into a monster. Masked Rider will now have to find a way to get Fluffy back to normal and defeat Bananatex.
37	"The Invasion of Leawood"	Rob Malenfant	Mark Litton	November 4, 1996
Count Dregon issues an ultimatum to Leawood: Masked Rider must surrender or the Insectovore Bruticon (who previously conquered a galaxy on Count Dregon's behalf) will destroy the city. Dex must team up with the Masked Rider Warriors dispatched by King Lexian to save the city from this new menace. NOTE: This episode is actually the series finale as it was the last to be created production wise.
38	"The Eye of Edenoi"	Terence Winkless	Joseph Kuhr	November 5, 1996
Dex tells of the Edenoite legend of the Ocusect in which any Edenoite that looks at the eye in the middle of its forehead is frozen with fear forever. Despite having the same fear of the Ocusect as his fellow Edenoites, Dregon plans to create an Ocusect that he controls to trick Dex into being pulled inside its eye, where he can take Dex's Masked Rider powers.
39	"Exit Nefaria, Enter Barbaria"	Terence Winkless	Mark Litton	November 18, 1996
Fed up with Nefaria's failures and the defeat of the Insectovore Lobstatron, Count Dregon shrinks her and transfers her powers to Barbara Stewart, dubbing his new servant "Barbaria". Masked Rider must find a way to break the spell as well as defeat the Insectivore Predavore.
40	"Detention"	Rob Malenfant	Margo McCahon	November 20, 1996
Count Dregon sends Maggots to implant the Insectovore Brain Mite in Dex's mind. It will stab the Masked Rider's brain and take control of his arms and legs. Dex cannot control himself even when he and Molly end up in detention.
