= The Marlborough Science Academy =

Location
- Watling Street; St Albans, Hertfordshire, AL1 2QA; England; 51.73849°N 0.34936°W

Information
- Type: Academy
- Motto: Shaping Futures
- Established: 1953
- Department for Education URN: 138042 Tables
- Ofsted: Reports
- Headteacher: Annie Thomson
- Gender: Mixed
- Age: 11 to 18
- Enrolment: 1158
- Houses: Mars, Mercury, Neptune and Saturn
- Website: http://www.themarlboroughscienceacademy.co.uk/

The Marlborough Science Academy is a secondary school and sixth form with Academy status, located in St Albans, Hertfordshire, England. It has a specialism in science.

The school has approximately 1,200 students and 80 teachers. Marlborough School was originally known as St Julian's Secondary, split into two separate schools, an all-girls school, and an all-boys school. Spencer Hall (now called Da Vinci Hall) was the centre of the girls' school, and Churchill Hall (now called Pascal Hall) was the centre of the boys' school.

New science laboratories opened in 2002 were named after former Headmaster Anthony Bartlett.

Since the schools' opening in 1953, the site has displayed the grade II listed Barbara Hepworth sculpture Turning Forms.

It is regarded as a good school by Ofsted Officials.

== Alumni ==
Oliver Tarvet (b. 2003) Tennis Player

Paul Cattermole (b. 1977 d. 2023) Musician and Former Member of S Club 7
