= St Ives Guildhall =

Municipal building in St Ives, Cornwall, England

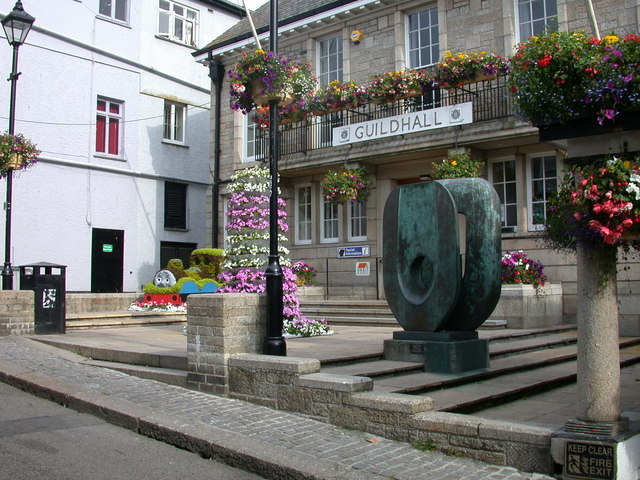
- St Ives Guildhall

- Shown in Cornwall
- 50.2116°N 5.4803°W
- Location: Street An Pol, St Ives

History
- Built: 1940

Site notes
- Architect: Geoffrey B. Drewitt
- Architectural style: Neoclassical style

St Ives Guildhall is a municipal structure in Street An Pol, St Ives, Cornwall, England. The structure, which is the meeting place of St Ives Town Council, is a locally listed heritage asset.

== History ==
The first municipal building in St Ives was a medieval guildhall in Fore Street which was completed in 1490. The local portreeve, John Payne, who held meetings in the old guildhall, was hanged as a rebel during the Prayer Book Rebellion in 1549. In the 1820s, civic leaders decided to demolish the old guildhall and replace it with a market hall. The new market hall, which included a lock-up on the ground floor and an assembly hall on the first floor, was completed in 1832: the area became a municipal borough with the building functioning as its headquarters in 1835. The assembly room was used as a courthouse as well as a civic meeting place.

Following a significant increase in population, largely associated with the fishing industry, civic leaders decided that the town needed a purpose-built guildhall: the site they selected in Street An Pol, was occupied by a mansion known as The Retreat, which had been the home of the Anthony family and, later, of the Lanham family. In the late 19th century, James Lanham had opened an art gallery which was the genesis of the St Ives art colony.

The new building was designed by a local architect, Geoffrey B. Drewitt, in the neoclassical style and built in ashlar stone. The design involved a symmetrical main frontage with five bays facing onto Street An Pol; the central bay featured a deeply recessed doorway with a stone surround flanked by brackets supporting a wide wrought iron balcony which encompassed the centre three bays. The ground floor was fenestrated by rows of six small windows on either side of the central bay while the first floor was fenestrated by tall sash windows and there was a turret at roof level. Internally, the principal rooms were the main hall, the council chamber, the balcony room and the mayor's parlour. The council held its first meeting in the new building on 16 December 1940.

The guildhall continued to serve as the headquarters of the borough council for much of the 20th century, but ceased to be the local seat of government when the enlarged Penwith District Council was formed in 1974. A visitor information centre was subsequently established in the guildhall, which also became the meeting place of St Ives Town Council.

A bronze sculpture entitled Dual Form, designed by the sculptor, Dame Barbara Hepworth, who lived in St Ives, was unveiled outside the guildhall in 1966. In 2024, it was reported that the sculpture would be moved to Kresen Kernow in Redruth while the guildhall underwent renovation. Works of art in the guildhall include a painting by Mary McCrossan depicting an interior with a still life, and a painting by Robert Borlase Smart depicting a clipper in St Ives Bay as well as a smaller sculpture by Barbara Hepworth entitled Small Form.
