= Doves (Group) =

Bronze sculpture by Barbara Hepworth

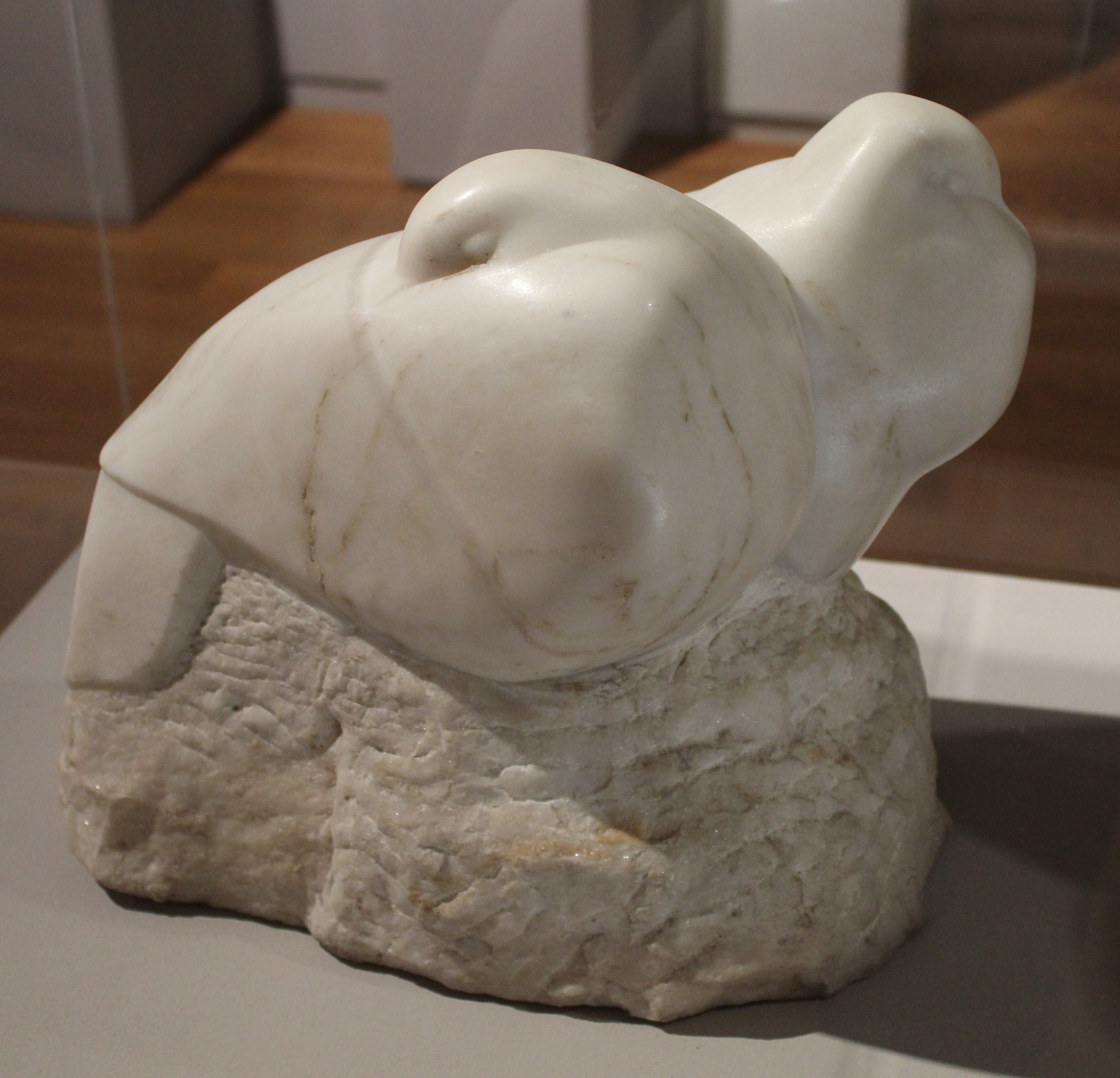
- Artist: Barbara Hepworth
- Year: 1927
- Type: Parian marble
- Dimensions: 29 cm × 33 cm × 21.5 cm (11 in × 13 in × 8.5 in)
- Location: Manchester Art Gallery

Doves (Group) (given the catalogue number BH 3) is a 1927 sculpture by British sculptor Barbara Hepworth. It is her earliest surviving stone carving and is in the collection of the Manchester Art Gallery.

== Background ==
Having studied in Leeds and the Royal College of Art, Hepworth travelled to Italy when she was 21. There she had her "most formative year by far", visiting Florence, Siena and Rome and meeting John Skeaping, who she would marry after a short love affair. The pair studied together under Giovanni Ardini who taught them to carve marble.

Although Doves has been said to have been carved in Italy, Hepworth and Skeaping returned to London in November 1926.

Hepworth had created a similar sculpture titled Dove (catalogue number BH1) in 1925 out of Carrara marble but it was reported to have been destroyed by 1952.

== Work ==
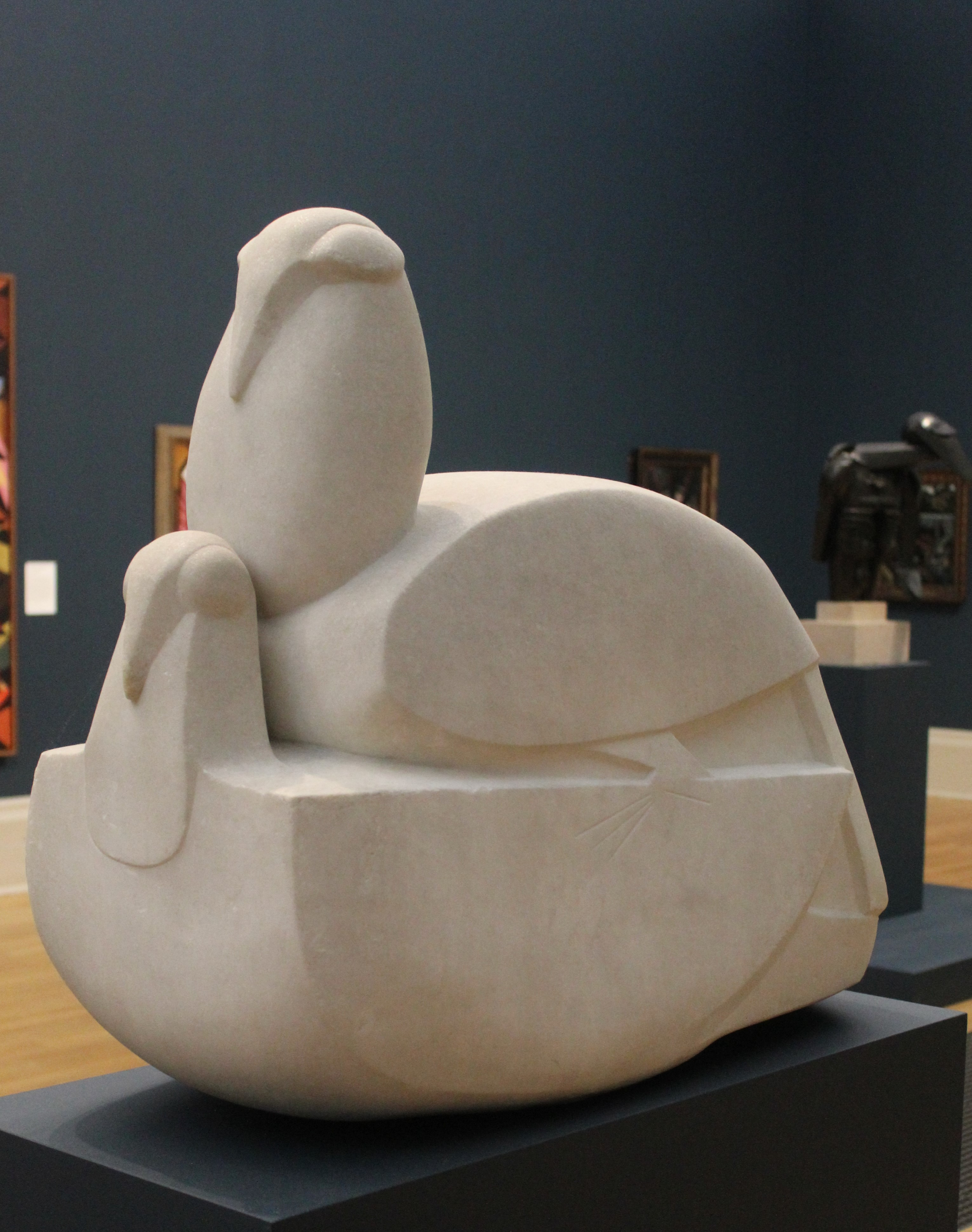
Doves (Second Version) by Jacob Epstein. Epstein's work inspired Hepworth's marble carving.

The sculpture depicts two doves sitting next to each other with their heads tucked into their feathers. The birds' forms are rounded and simple and the sculpture's base is left rough and signed and dated by Hepworth.

The work is figurative, making it one of Hepworth's less abstract sculptures. Hepworth and Skeaping kept doves and the sculpture was made at around life-size from an inexpensive piece of Parian marble. It is an example of Hepworth using the direct carving technique.

The sculpture also took inspiration from marble sculptures of mating doves by Jacob Epstein.

== History ==
The work was purchased by Manchester Art Gallery from Beaux Arts Gallery in 1942. A review of an exhibition at the gallery in 1979 noted Doves as a particular highlight, with the author writing "I wonder how many visitors, like myself, could not resist stroking those cold, white, folded wings when the attendant was not looking!" It was included in an exhibition of British inter-war art in 2013–14, as well as an exhibition of the gallery's sculpture collection in 2019.

It has also been displayed at the 1950 Venice Biennale by the British Council, in a Tate retrospective in 1968, in an exhibition at Glasgow Museums in 1987, and at the 2015 Tate Britain exhibition titled Barbara Hepworth: Sculpture for a Modern World.
