= List of paintings by Zainul Abedin =

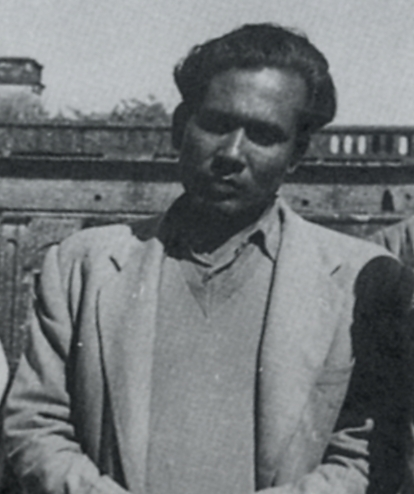
Zainul Abedin

This list of paintings by the Bengali painter Zainul Abedin is incomplete.

Image	Title	Year	Technique	Dimensions	Collection	Notes
	Dumka Forest (Note: Also called Banani Dumka)	1934	Watercolour on paper	37 × 28 cm	Bangladesh National Museum	
	Study: Village Pathway	1934	Watercolour on paper	28 × 22.5 cm	Bangladesh National Museum	
	Zoo Study	1935	Watercolour on paper or drawing (sources vary)	-×- cm	-	
	Harvesting (Note: Also called Harvest)	1934/1938	Oil on canvas	-×- cm	-	
	Famine	1943	Watercolour on paper	38 × 29.5 cm	Bangladesh National Museum	
	Tea Stall	1943	Oil on canvas	57.5 × 75 cm	Abul Khair	
	Waiting	1943	Watercolour on paper	37 × 56 cm	Bangladesh National Museum	
	Angling	1946	Watercolour on paper	57.5 × 77.5 cm	Jahanara Abedin	
	40/2 Abdul Hadi Lane	1948	Oil on board	26.5 × 19 cm	Jahanara Abedin	
	Harvest	1948	Watercolour on paper	57.5 × 77.5 cm	Jahanara Abedin	
	Reading (Note: Also called Girl Reading in a Chair)	1948	Oil on board or cardboard (sources vary)	26.5 × 19 cm	Jahanara Abedin	
	Still Life	1948	Oil on canvas	76 × 56 cm	Bangladesh National Museum	
	Dumka	1940s	Oil on board	23 × 33 cm	Bangladesh National Museum	
	Dumka	1940s	Oil on board	23 × 33 cm	Bangladesh National Museum	
	Dumka	1940s	Watercolour on paper	29 × 38.5 cm	Abul Khair	
	Dumka	1940s	Watercolour on paper	28 × 38 cm	Abul Khair	
	Dumka	1940s	Watercolour on paper	28 × 38 cm	Abul Khair	
	Dumka	1940s	Watercolour on paper	28 × 38 cm	Abul Khair	
	Dumka	1940s	Watercolour on paper	38 × 28.5 cm	Abul Khair	
	Dumka	1940s	Watercolour on paper	28 × 38 cm	Abul Khair	
	Dumka	1940s	Watercolour on paper	37 × 27 cm	Abul Khair	
	Dumka	1940s	Watercolour on paper	38 × 28 cm	Abul Khair	
	Dumka	1940s	Watercolour on paper	28 × 38 cm	Abul Khair	
	Dumka	1940s	Watercolour on paper	28 × 38 cm	Abul Khair	
	Dumka	1940s	Watercolour on paper	25.5 × 38 cm	Jahanara Abedin	
	Dumka	1940s	Watercolour on paper	28.5 × 38.5 cm	Jahanara Abedin	
	Dumka Landscape	1940s	Oil on board	19.5 × 32.5 cm	Bangladesh National Museum	
	Dumka Landscape	1940s	Oil on board	19.5 × 32.5 cm	Jahanara Abedin	
	Girl in the Garden	1940s	Watercolour on paper	72 × 64.5 cm	Abul Khair	
	Hut	1940s	Watercolour on paper	13.5 × 28.5 cm	Bangladesh National Museum	
	Portrait	1940s	Oil on board	24 × 16.5 cm	Bangladesh National Museum	
	Santal Landscape	1940s	Watercolour on paper	38 × 28 cm	Bangladesh National Museum	
	Silent Trio	1940s	Watercolour on paper	29 × 39 cm	Jahanara Abedin	
	Santhal Maidens	c. 1950	Oil	-×- cm	-	
	After Fishing	1950	Watercolour on paper	57 × 77.5 cm	Bangladesh National Museum	
	Kalboishakhi (Note: Also called Storm)	1950	Watercolour on paper	57 × 75 cm	Bangladesh National Museum	
	After Bathing	1951	Watercolour on paper	68 × 41.5 cm	Bangladesh National Museum	
	Crossing the Moyurakhhi	1951	Watercolour on paper	57 × 75.5 cm	Jahanara Abedin	
	Mother and Child	1951	Tempera on paper	54.5 × 26 cm	Bangladesh National Museum	
	Mother and Child	1951	Tempera on paper	53 × 34.5 cm	Bangladesh National Museum	
	Rebel Cow (Note: Also called Retreat)	1951	Watercolour on paper	58.5 × 76 cm	-	
	Santal Couple (Note: Also called From the Market (Santhal))	1951	Watercolour on paper	68.5 × 54.5 cm	Jahanara Abedin	
	Santal Man and Woman	1951	Watercolour on paper	58.4 × 73.7 cm		
	Santal Women (Note: Also called Two Santhal Women)	1951	Watercolour on paper	81.5 × 67 cm	Bangladesh National Museum	
	Two Santhal Women	1951	Watercolour on paper	73.7 × 58.5 cm	-	
	Waiting for the Ferry to Cross the Brahmaputra	1951	Watercolour on soft-board paper	34 × 52 cm	Bangladesh National Museum	
	Woman	1951	Tempera on paper	50.5 × 14.5 cm	Bangladesh National Museum	
	Woman with a Pitcher	1951	Watercolour on paper	54 × 41 cm	Bangladesh National Museum	
	Beauty Regime / Women Dressing Hair	1953	Oil on paper	51 × 36 cm	Bangladesh National Museum	
	Face of a Woman	1953	Gouache on paper	26.5 × 20 cm	Bangladesh National Museum	
	Family	1953	Watercolour on paper	70 × 38 cm	Bangladesh National Museum	
	Mother and Child	1953	Watercolour on paper	29 × 23 cm	Bangladesh National Museum	
	Painyar Ma (Note: Also called Village Maiden)	1953	Gouache or oil on paper (sources vary)	32 × 23 cm	-	
	Peasant	1953	Watercolour on paper	30.5 × 18 cm	Bangladesh National Museum	
	Reflecting (Note: Also called Bride)	1952/1953	Tempera or oil on paper (sources vary)	37.5 × 27 cm	Bangladesh National Museum	
	Snake Charmers	1953	Tempera on paper	34.5 × 17 cm	Bangladesh National Museum	
	Three Women	1953	Tempera on paper	38 × 28 cm	Bangladesh National Museum	
	Two Sisters (Note: Also called Two Faces or Two Women)	1953	Gouache on paper	29 × 23 cm	Bangladesh National Museum	
	Woman	1953	Tempera on paper	45.5 × 29 cm	Bangladesh National Museum	
	Struggle	1954	Tempera on masonite board	60 × 243 cm	Bangladesh National Museum	
	Towing Boat (Note: Also called Boatman)	1953/1955	Gouache on paper	25 × 35 cm	Bangladesh National Museum	
	Untitled (Two Children)	1955	Watercolour on paper	21 7/8 × 24 5/8 in. (55.6 × 62.5 cm.)	The private collection of late Elizabeth Lindsey	
	Urban House	1955	Oil on paper	32.5 × 51 cm	Abul Khair	
	Foreign Land	1956	Watercolour on paper	35.5 × 28 cm	-	
	In the Streets	1956	Watercolour on paper	30 × 24.5 cm	-	
	On the Coast	1956	Watercolour on paper	28 × 35.5 cm	-	
	Generations	1957	Oil on canvas	43 × 68.5 cm	Bangladesh National Museum	
	Manhattan	1957	Watercolour on paper	35.5 × 28 cm	Bangladesh National Museum	
	Near Niagara Falls	1957	Watercolour on paper	36 × 31 cm	-	
	Rural Landscape	1957	Watercolour on paper	38 × 50 cm	Bangladesh National Museum	
	Levelling the Ploughed Field (Note: Also called Harrowing)	1957/1959	Watercolour on paper	58 × 75 cm	Bangladesh National Museum	
	Boat	1958	Watercolour	-×- cm	Bangladesh National Museum	
	The Struggle	1959	Oil and tempera on masonite board	155 × 627 cm	-	
	Angling	1950s	Watercolour on paper	57 × 77.5 cm	Bangladesh National Museum	
	Boats on the Hily River	1950s	Watercolour on paper	56 × 76 cm	Bangladesh National Museum	
	Chittagong Hill Tracts	1950s	Watercolour on paper	56 × 76 cm	Bangladesh National Museum	
	Chittagong Hill Tracts	1950s	Watercolour on paper	56 × 76 cm	Bangladesh National Museum	
	Damsel	1950s	Oil on board	53 × 46 cm	Bangladesh National Museum	
	Dignity of Labour	1950s	Oil on paper	56 × 38 cm	Bangladesh National Museum	
	Face of a Woman	1950s	Gouache on board	70 × 54 cm	Bangladesh National Museum	
	Farmer with His Cow	1950s	Watercolour on paper on board	16 × 38 cm	Bangladesh National Museum	
	Kalboishakhi	1950s	Watercolour on paper	-×- cm	-	
	On the Way to Work	1950s	Oil on board	47 × 29 cm	Bangladesh National Museum	
	Painter	1950s	Gouache and poster colour on paper	20 × 13 cm	Bangladesh National Museum	
	Santal Men and Women	1950s	Watercolour on paper	56 × 76 cm	Bangladesh National Museum	
	Still Life	1950s	Oil on board	82 × 61 cm	Bangladesh National Museum	
	Toilette	1950s	Watercolour on paper	39 × 36 cm	Bangladesh National Museum	
	Toilette	1950s	Oil on paper	36.5 × 26.5 cm	Bangladesh National Museum	
	Tribal Man	1950s	Oil on board	76 × 56 cm	Bangladesh National Museum	
	Tribal Woman	1950s	Oil on board	76 × 56 cm	Bangladesh National Museum	
	River Buriganga	1966	Watercolour on paper	56 × 75 cm	Shafiqul & Selima Islam	
	Toilette	1966	Acrylic on paper	27 × 21.5 cm	Jahanara Abedin	
	River	1967	Watercolour on paper	54 × 74 cm	Syed Manzur Elahi	
	Toilette	1967	Oil on canvas	76 × 102 cm	Hamida Hossain	
	Bamboo Fort of Titumir	1968	Mixed media on board	122 × 144 cm	Bangladesh National Museum	
	Moyurakhhi Village	1968	Watercolour on paper	52 × 74 cm	-	
	Rebel Cows	1968	Watercolour on paper	54 × 74 cm	-	
	Santal Men and Women	1968	Watercolour on paper	52 × 74 cm	-	
	Study for a Painting	1969	Watercolour on paper	11 × 31 cm	Bangladesh National Museum	
	Towing Boat	1968	Watercolour on paper	54 × 74 cm	-	
	Untitled (Santhal Women)	1969	Oil on canvas	155.3 × 68.6 cm	-	
	Boats	1960s	Watercolour on paper	56 × 76 cm	Bangladesh National Museum	
	Fishing	1960s	Watercolour on paper	56 × 76 cm	Bangladesh National Museum	
	Fishing	1969	Oil on paper	6.5 × 30 cm	Jahanara Abedin	
	Mosque	1960s	Watercolour on paper	56 × 76 cm	Bangladesh National Museum	
	River View at Sadarghat	1960s	Watercolour on paper	56 × 76 cm	Bangladesh National Museum	
	Steamer on River Buriganga	1960s	Watercolour on paper	56 × 76 cm	Bangladesh National Museum	
	Gypsy Boat	1970	Oil on canvas	68 × 251 cm	Bangladesh National Museum	
	Life in Bangladesh	1970	Wax, black ink, and watercolour on paper	120 × 1980 cm	-	
	Monpura	1970	Watercolour and wax on paper	27.5 × 36 cm	Jahanara Abedin	
	Monpura	1970	Watercolour and wax on paper	27.5 × 36 cm	Jahanara Abedin	
	Nabanna	1970	Watercolour and wax on paper scroll	105 × 1,950 cm	Bangladesh National Museum	
	Returning Home	1970	Oil on canvas	99 × 244 cm	Bangladesh National Museum	
	Sailing Boats	1970	Watercolour on paper	19 × 28 cm	Jahanara Abedin	
	Two Faces	1970	Acrylic on paper	55 × 75 cm	Muhammad Aziz Khan	
	Bangladesh Liberation war	1971		-×- cm	-	
	Birangana (Unsung Ballads)	1971	Oil on canvas	91.5 × 96.5 cm	Jahanara Abedin	
	The Return	1971	Watercolour on paper	11.5 × 60 cm	Jahanara Abedin	
	Bride with a Mirror	1972	Acrylic on paper	96.5 × 71 cm	Jahanara Abedin	
	Composition (Note: Also called Untitled Abstract Composition)	1972	Oil on canvas	99 × 127 cm	Bangladesh National Museum	
	Resting	1972	Acrylic on paper	36 × 26.5 cm	Jahanara Abedin	
	Fishing Boats	1973	Watercolour on paper	14 × 19 cm	Jahanara Abedin	
	Fishing Boats	1973	Oil on canvas	82 × 112 cm	Mustafa Zaman Abbasi	
	Women with Pitchers	1973	Oil on canvas	98 × 151 cm	Syed Manzur Elahi	
	Towing Boat	1974	Watercolour and wax on paper	56 × 76 cm	Jahanara Abedin	
	Bathing	1976	Oil on canvas	109 × 184 cm	Jahanara Abedin	
	Struggle	1976	Oil on canvas	60 × 243 cm	Jahanara Abedin	
	Untitled (Unfinished)	1970s	Oil on canvas	76 × 97 cm	Bangladesh National Museum	

== Notes and references ==
=== References ===
- Dadi, Iftikhar (2010). Modernism and the Art of Muslim South Asia. The University of North Carolina Press. ISBN 978-0-8078-3358-2.
- Falvo, Rosa Maria, ed. (2012). Zainul Abedin. Bengal Foundation. ISBN 978-88-572-1077-3.
- "Zainul Used Western Technique to Interpret Rural Life in Pakistan". The Illustrated Weekly of Pakistan. 11 August 1968.
- Jahangir, Burhanuddin Khan (1993). The Quest of Zainul Abedin. Translated by Guhathakurta, Meghna. The International Centre for Bengal Studies. ISBN 984-8127-01-1.
- Selim, Lala Rukh (2007). Art and Crafts. Asiatic Society of Bangladesh. OCLC 299379796.
