= Turning Forms =

Sculpture in St. Albans, Hertfordshire, England

Coordinates: 51°44′20″N 0°20′56″W

Turning Forms (BH 166) is a concrete sculpture by Barbara Hepworth, one of her first public commissions, made in 1950 for the Festival of Britain. It was one of two Hepworth commissions for the Festival: the other was a sculpture of abstract standing figures, Contrapuntal Forms, now in Harlow. Turning Forms has been sited at a school in St Albans since 1953. Both of Hepworth's sculptures were listed at Grade II in 1998.

Like most sculptures for the Festival of Britain, Contrapuntal Forms was commissioned by the Arts Council, but unusually Turning Forms was commissioned and paid for directly by the Festival board, at the instigation of the architect Jane Drew, to complement her design for the Thameside Restaurant. Hepworth made the sculpture in collaboration with Drew, unusually adopting a Constructivist style reminiscent of the work of Naum Gabo, such as his later kinetic sculpture Revolving Torsion. Hepworth returned to a similar theme with a similarly-named drawing in 1957, held by Kettle's Yard in Cambridge.

Turning Firms is an abstract work which stands 84 inches (210 cm) high. It comprises twisting loops of concrete, painted white, supported by a metal armature. The armature was fabricated in Plymouth and coated with a lightweight core of vermiculite then finished with layers of concrete added and shaped by Hepworth at her studio in St Ives. The surface finish is a white "Snowcrete" Portland cement, covered with a layer of white "Snowcem" masonry paint, both products from Blue Circle.

The sculpture was exhibited outside the Thameside Restaurant at the Festival of Britain in 1951, near Waterloo Bridge, mounted a motorised plinth that slowly completed a rotation in two minutes. The sculpture was acquired by Hertfordshire County Council: at the time, the Council had embarked on an ambitious programme to build new schools, and acquired artworks to decorate them: for example, a cast of Henry Moore's Family Group is on display at Barclay Academy in Stevenage. Hepworth's sculpture has been sited at St Julian's School, now The Marlborough Science Academy, in St Albans since its opening in 1953.

It was removed temporarily for conservation in October 2000, and then exhibited at the Hepworth Wakefield from May to November 2021 alongside Contrapuntal Forms for the first time since 1951, before returning to the school.
