= Two Forms (Divided Circle) =

Sculpture by Barbara Hepworth

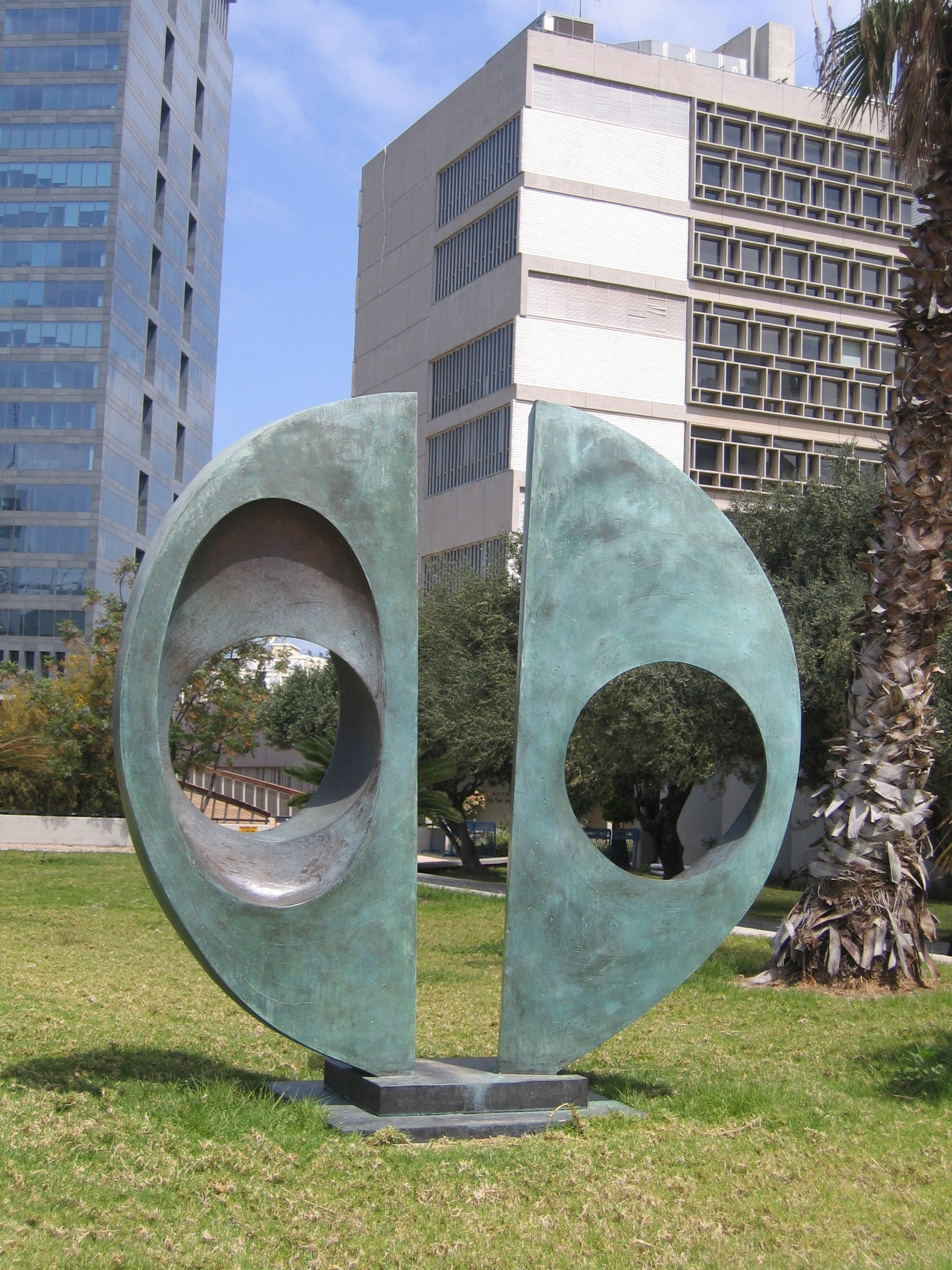
- Two Forms (Divided Circle) in Israel.
- Year: 1969
- Dimensions: 237 cm × 234 cm × 54.3 cm (93 in × 92 in × 21.4 in)
- Accession: BH 477

Two Forms (Divided Circle) (BH 477) is a bronze sculpture by Barbara Hepworth, designed in 1969. Six numbered copies were cast, plus one (0/6) retained by the sculptor. The sculpture's dimensions are 237 centimetres (93 in) by 234 centimetres (92 in) by 54 centimetres (21 in).

The front of the base has "Barbara Hepworth 1969" inscribed on it followed by the number of the sculpture, as well as "Morris | Singer | FOUNDERS | LONDON", both inscribed by casting.

The sculpture is considered to be one of Britain's most recognisable works.

The sculpture is late work by Hepworth, created only 6 years before her death in a fire at her studio in St Ives in 1975. It includes two vertical bronze semi-circles forming a broken circle approximately 2 metres (6 ft 7 in) across, each pieced pierced by one large hole. Both elements are welded to a bronze base. All three elements are hollow, and were cast in London by Morris Singer.

Hepworth designed the work after being diagnosed with cancer in 1966. She wanted the viewer's body to be engaged with her work, saying: "You can climb through the Divided Circle – you don't need to do it physically to experience it."

Hepworth also made a series of nine maquettes about 14.5 inches (370 mm) tall, Maquette for Divided Circle, cast in polished bronze.

== Casts ==
Image	Number	Location	Owner	Notes
	0/6	Barbara Hepworth Museum, St Ives	Tate Gallery	Bequested by the executors of Hepworth's estate to Tate in 1980.
	4/6	Junction of Moor Lane and Deansgate, Bolton. In front of the Senate House.	Bolton Museum (on loan to University of Bolton).	Purchased in 1970; relocated in 1982.
	5/6	Dulwich Park	Southwark Council	The sculpture was purchased by Greater London Council in 1970; its ownership was subsequently transferred to Southwark Council. The sculpture was stolen overnight on 19–20 December 2011. The theft was thought to be due to metal thieves, and it was feared that the sculpture was sold for scrap. The sculpture was insured for £500,000, and Southwark Council offered a reward of £1,000 for information leading to the arrest and conviction of the thieves; the reward was subsequently increased to £5,000 by Barbara Hepworth's granddaughter. The scrap value of the sculpture was estimated to be £750. The sculpture was replaced by Conrad Shawcross's Three Perpetual Chords.
		East Lodge Garden, Downing College, Cambridge	Hepworth Estate (on indefinite loan to Downing College)	Installed at Downing in 2018. Was previously located in the Fellows' Garden, Clare College, Cambridge.
		Mary and Leigh Block Museum of Art, Northwestern University, Evanston, Illinois.		
		Lola Beer Ebner Sculpture Garden in Tel Aviv		
		Private collection in the USA		

== See also ==
- List of heists in the United Kingdom
- Reclining Figure 1969–70
