= Contrapuntal Forms (Hepworth) =

Stone sculpture by Barbara Hepworth

Coordinates: 51°46′45″N 0°06′45″E

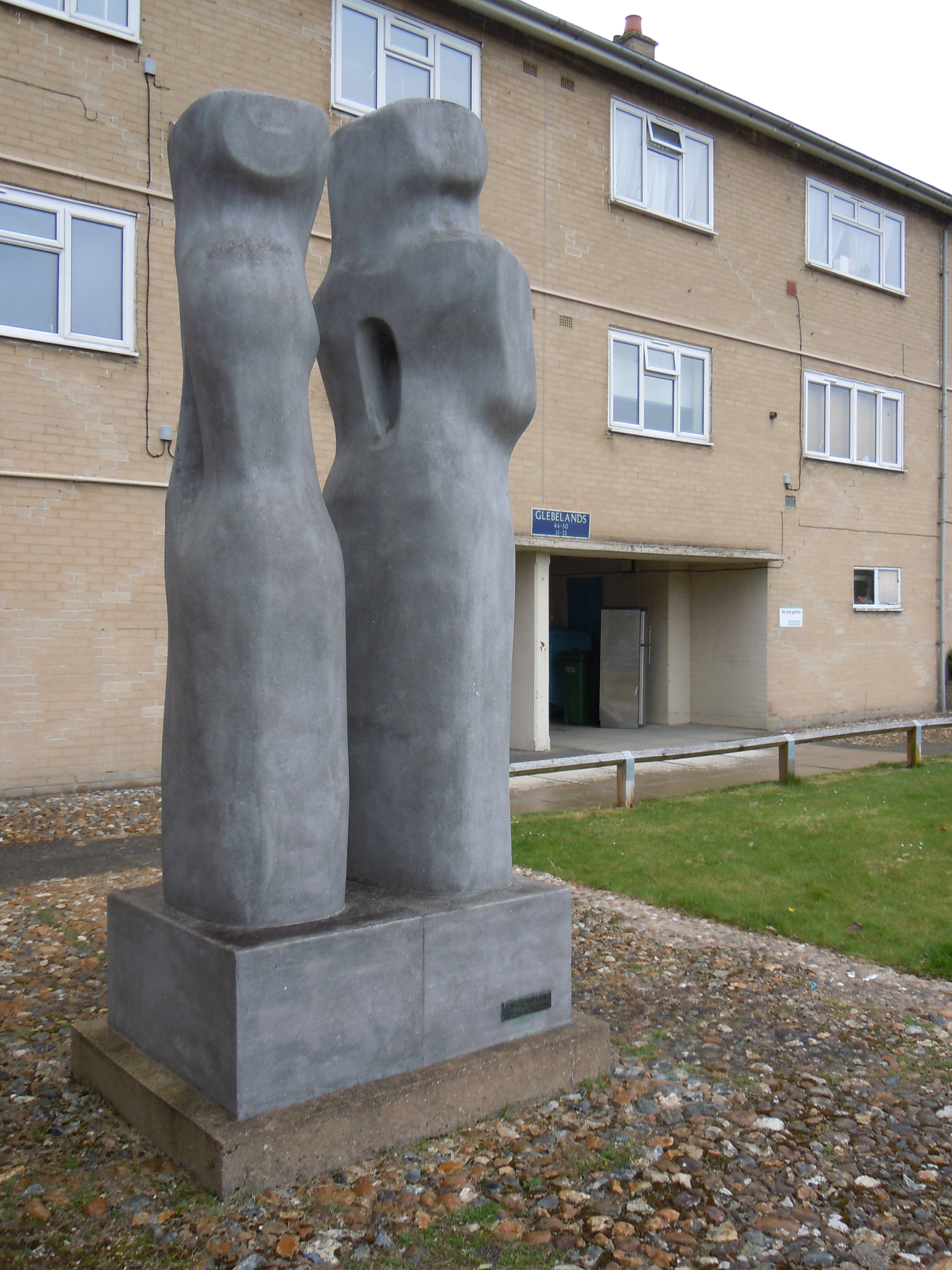
Contrapuntal Forms, in Harlow in 2016

Contrapuntal Forms (BH 165) is a stone sculpture by Barbara Hepworth, one of her first public commissions, made in 1950–51 for the Festival of Britain and installed outside the Dome of Discovery on South Bank, London. It was one of two Hepworth commissions for the festival: the other was an abstract rotating sculpture, Turning Forms (BH 166).

The work stands 120" (3.04m) high and is carved from blue limestone from County Galway, Ireland. It depicts two semi-abstracted standing figures. The sculpture was commissioned by the Arts Council of Great Britain who presented it to the new town of Harlow in Essex in 1953. It was the first artwork acquired (though not the first commissioned) by the Harlow Art Trust, and it is still sited at Glebelands in Harlow.

The sculpture was listed Grade II on the National Heritage List for England in April 1998.
