= Squares with Two Circles =

Sculpture by Barbara Hepworth

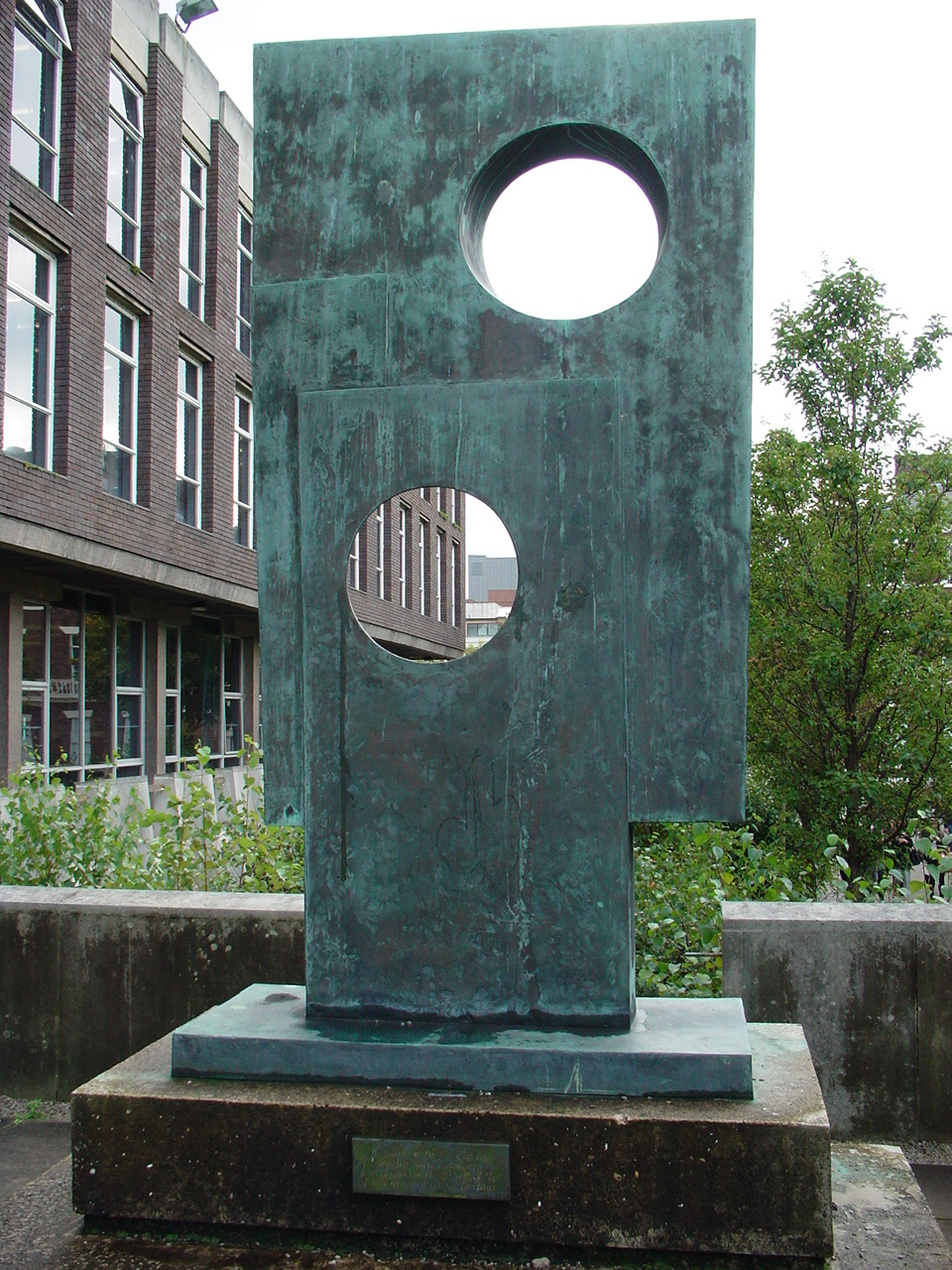
Artist's cast, 0/3, at the University of Liverpool

Squares with Two Circles (BH 347) is a large bronze sculpture by Barbara Hepworth, standing over 3 m (9.8 ft) high. It was designed in 1963 and cast at the Morris Singer foundry in 1964, in an edition of 3+1 (three casts for sale, plus one artist's copy). The four casts are displayed at the Yorkshire Sculpture Park, the University of Liverpool, the Kröller-Müller Museum, and at the Nasher Sculpture Center.

From the front, the sculpture comprises three flat rectangular shapes stacked above each other, with the upper two each pieced by an offset circular hole, lifted by the third forming a plinth. The holes are slightly conical, one widening to the front and the other to the back. From the rear, the rectangular shapes are stacked, with the lower rectangle extending beyond the lower hole, and the upper two shapes stepped back. The monumental vertical arrangement of a rectangular shape with pierced hole recalls Hepworth's 6 ft (1.8 m) high carving Monumental Stela (BH 82) made in 1936 from blue Ancaster stone, but damaged by shrapnel in the Second World War and now destroyed. The bronze monolith shares the large scale of her public commissions from the early 1960s, such as Meridian (BH 250) of 1958-60, Winged Figure (BH 315) of 1962-63, and Single Form (BH 325) of 1961-4. It was followed by similar flat geometric forms, such as Four-Square (Walk Through) (BH 433) of 1966 and Two Forms (Divided Circle) of 1969. Hepworth also designed a 12.5 in (32 cm) high bronze Maquette for monolith in 1963, cast in an edition of 9+1 (nine casts and an artist's copy).

Cast 1/3 was bought from the artist by the Tate Gallery in 1964, and has been on long-term loan since 1980, displayed at the Yorkshire Sculpture Park. A second cast, 2/3, was acquired in 1964 by the Kröller-Müller Museum in Otterlo in the Netherlands. A third cast, the artist's cast 0/3, was bought by the University of Liverpool in 1965. For many years it was displayed outside the university's Sydney Jones Library. It was moved to Crown Square in 2014, but returned to its original position on a high plinth near the library in 2023. The fourth cast, 3/3, was bought from Gimpel Fils by Patsy and Raymond Nasher in 1968 and is displayed at the Nasher Sculpture Center in Dallas, Texas.

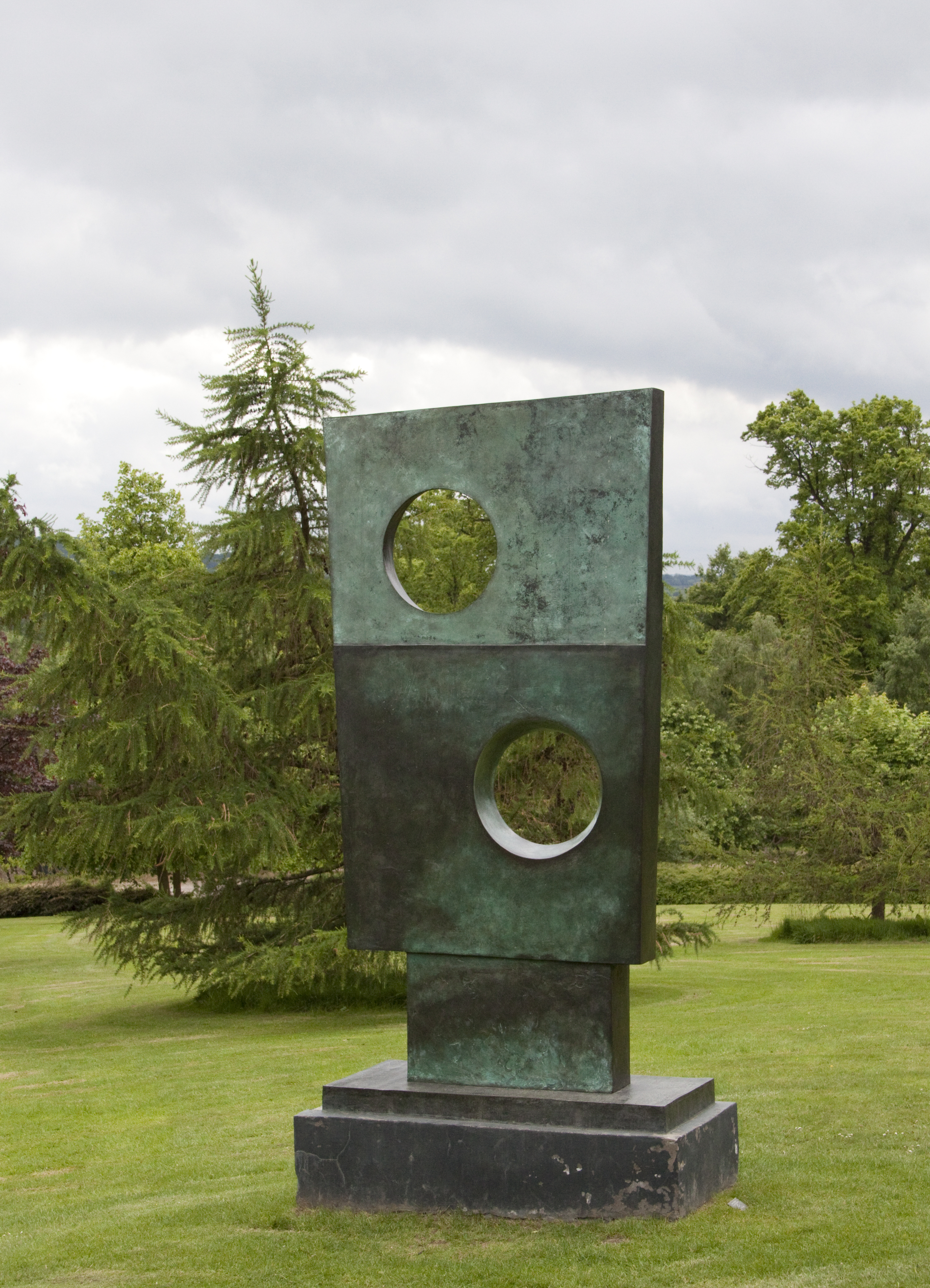
Yorkshire Sculpture Park

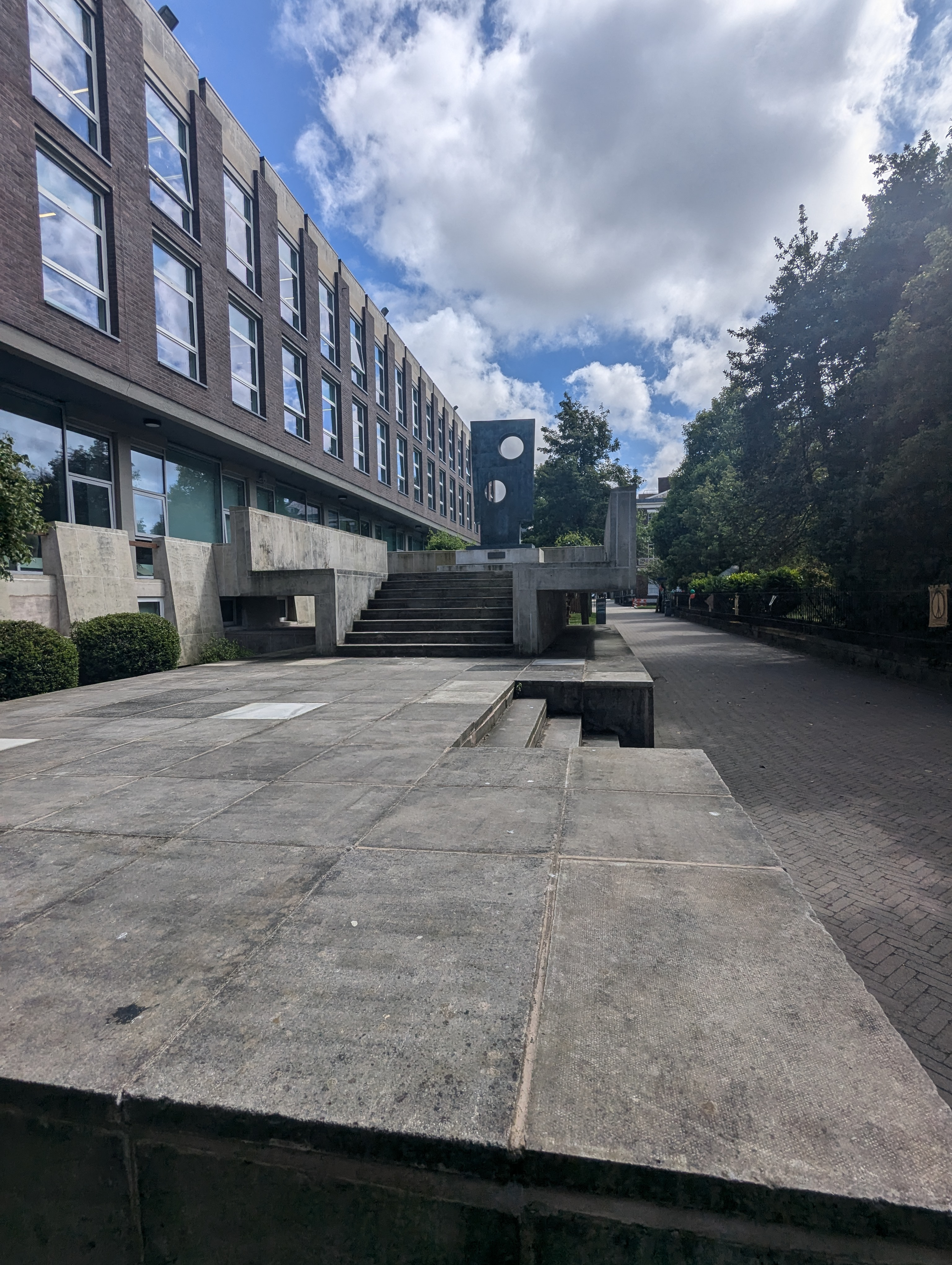
University of Liverpool

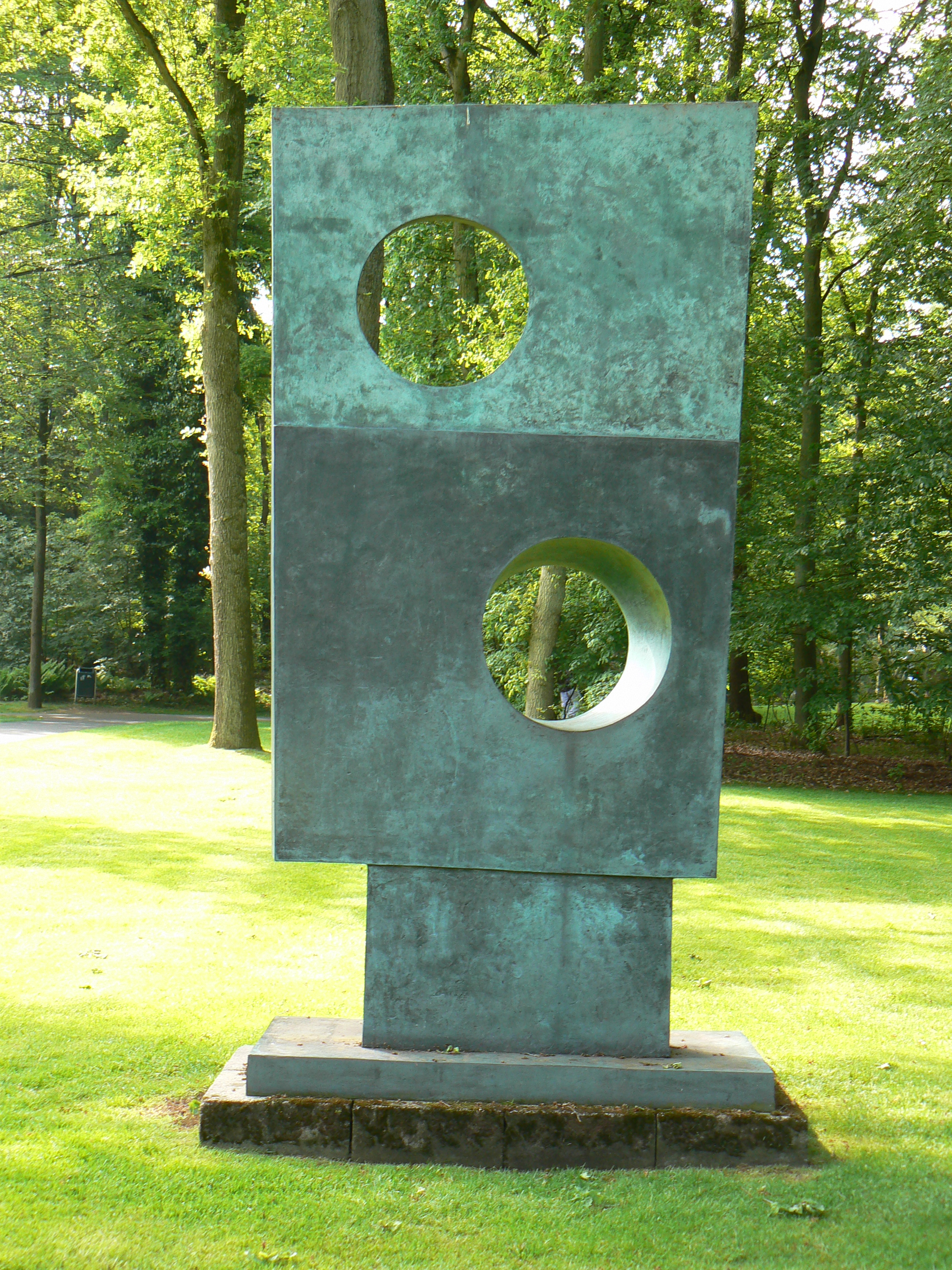
Kröller-Müller Museum

Nasher Sculpture Center
