= Single Form (Eikon) =

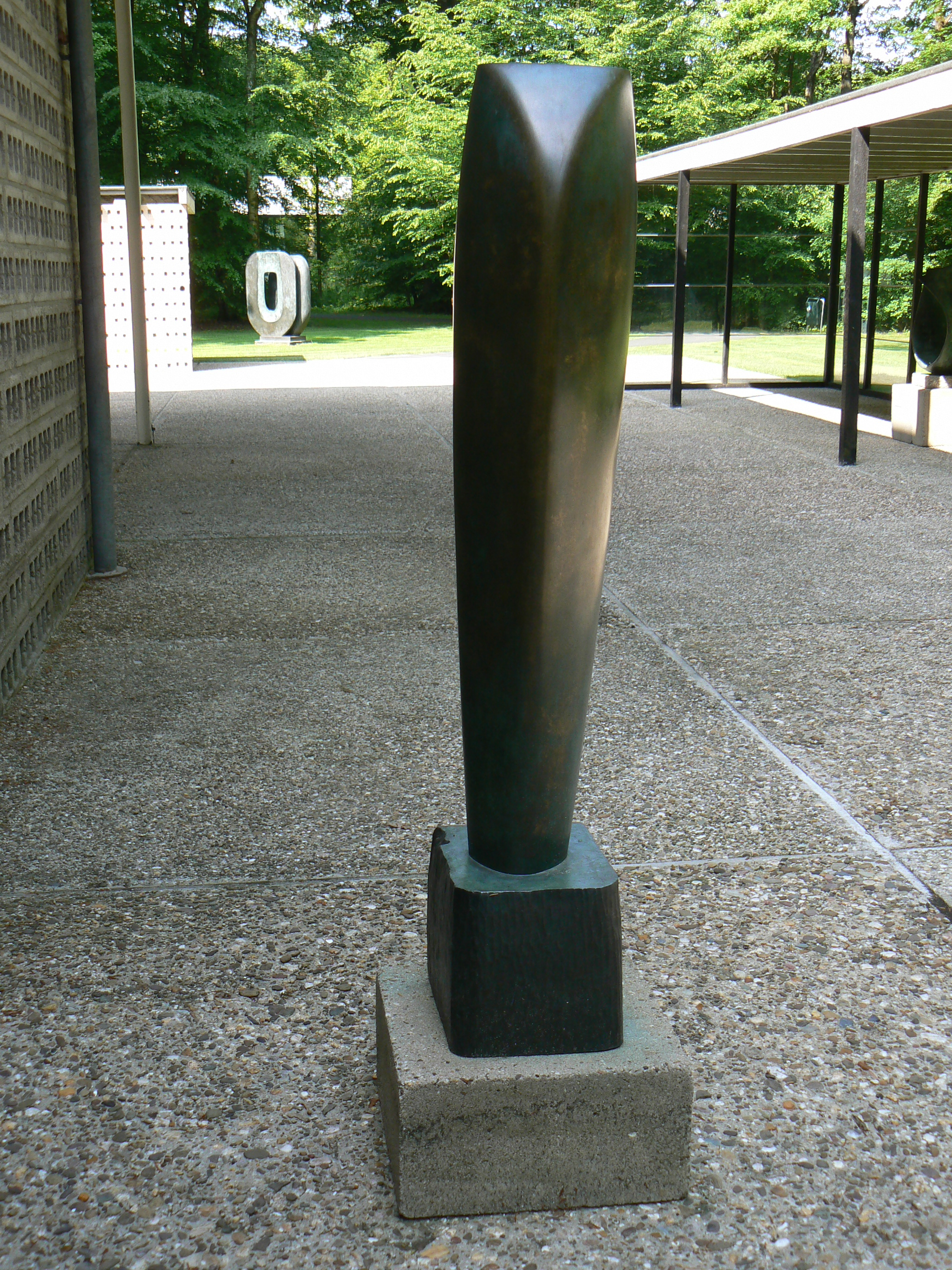
- Cast 4 of Single Form (Eikon), at the Kröller-Müller Museum
- Artist: Barbara Hepworth
- Year: 1963
- Catalogue: BH 329
- Medium: Bronze sculpture
- Movement: Constructivism
- Subject: A tall smooth columnar form supported on a roughly chiseled cuboid base
- Dimensions: 147 cm × 31 cm × 28 cm (58 in × 12 in × 11 in)
- Weight: 77 kilograms (170 lb)
- Location: sculpture garden of the Kröller-Müller Museum, Otterlo
- Accession: KM 128.750

Single Form (Eikon) (BH 329) is a sculpture by the British artist Barbara Hepworth. It was cast in bronze in 1963, based on a plaster model made in 1937–38. Bronze casts are held by several public collections, including the Metropolitan Museum of Art, the Government Art Collection, the Tate Gallery, the Milwaukee Art Museum and the Kröller-Müller Museum.

== Plaster sculpture ==
Hepworth made a series of Single Form sculptures in the 1930s, with examples in different woods exhibited in 1937, including lignum vitae (BH 92), plane (BH 94) and sycamore (BH 97, destroyed). A Single Form made in holly wood in 1937 (BH 102) has been held by the Leeds Art Gallery since 1990.

In 1937–38, Hepworth made a tall columnar sculpture like a modern totem pole for an exhibition in Paris. It was first exhibited in white unpainted plaster at the first Salon des Réalités Nouvelles exhibition at the Galerie Charpentier in 1939. This plaster form (BH 104) closely resembles a 1937 wooden Single Form made in sandalwood (BH 103) which was later owned by the United Nations Secretary General Dag Hammarskjöld, and now held by the Dag Hammarskjöld Museum at Backåkra. The simple geometric shape was influenced by her contact with European Constructivist artists, and has been compared to an abstracted standing figure or standing stone.

The plaster sculpture remained in Paris until it was return to Hepworth in 1961. It is now held by the artist's estate at the Barbara Hepworth Museum in St Ives, Cornwall.

== Bronze casts ==
Inspired by her earlier work, Hepworth cast a bronze edition of Single Form in Lignum Vitae (BH 92) in 1962. The following year, she cast the 1937-38 plaster Single Form in bronze in 1963, in series of 7+1 (seven plus an artist's copy), at the Morris Singer foundry. To distinguish it from the original plaster sculpture, the new bronze series was named Single Form (Eikon) - the parenthetical eikon meaning "image" in Greek. (From the 1940s onwards, many of Hepworth's Single Form sculptures are distinguished by a parenthetical addition, such as Single Form (Dryad) (BH 132, 1945–46), or Single Form (Antiphon) (BH 187, 1953). Single Form (Memorial) (BH 314, 1961–62) was created as part of the UN commission for a memorial to Dag Hammarskjöld after his death. After the casting process, the original 1930s plaster was painted with a stippled cobalt blue and mounted on new wooden base.

Single Form (Eikon) stands about 1.47 m (4.8 ft) tall and weighs about 77 kg (170 lb), comprising a tall smooth columnar form supported on a roughly chiseled cuboid base. The two pieces - column and base - were cast separately and secured together with a rod and bolt. The column broadens from the base, rising with a broadly triangular but smoothly rounded cross-section, widest at about two-thirds of its length, before narrowing to a truncated top.

The artist's cast, 0/7, was bought by the Metropolitan Museum of Art in 2018 to commemorate the museum's 150th anniversary. According to Hepworth's sculpture records, which are held by the Tate, cast 1/7 was sold privately, and cast 2/7 was sold to Mr and Mrs Peppiatt. Bonhams sold cast 3/7 in 2005, the first cast to be auctioned in public: it had been given by Hepworth to Eric Gibbard, the manager of the Morris Singer foundry, in 1963. Cast 4/7 has been held by the Kröller-Müller Museum since 1967. Cast 5/7 was sold in 1966 to Mrs Harry Lynde Bradley, who donated it to the Milwaukee Art Museum in 1975. Cast 6/7 was bought from Marlborough Fine Art in 1965 by the Government Art Collection and it is displayed in the garden of the British Ambassador's residence in Washington, DC. Hepworth presented cast 7/7 to the Tate Gallery in 1964.
