= Palais de Danse, St Ives =

Studio and former dance hall in St Ives, Cornwall

Palais de Danse
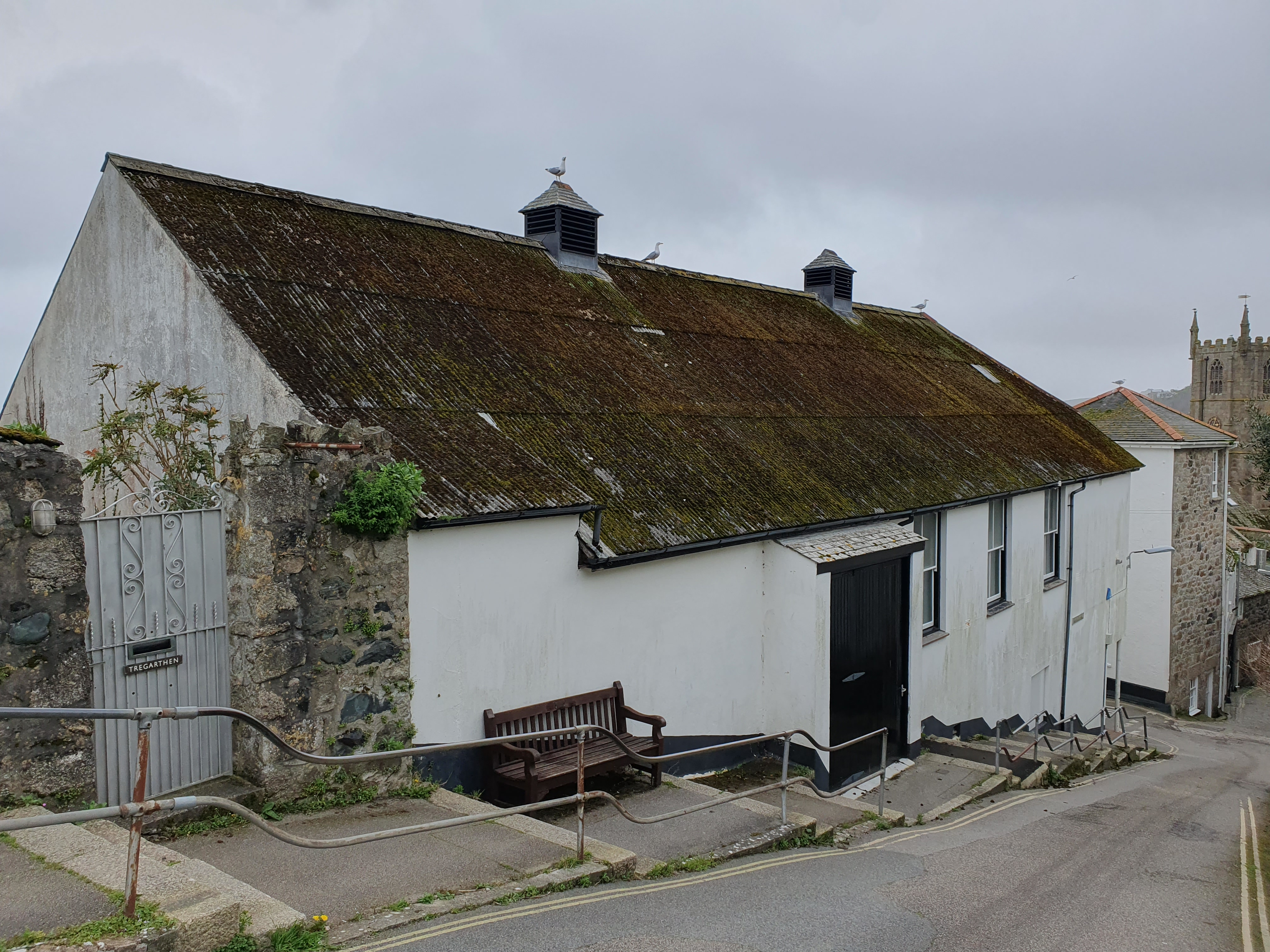
- Palais de Danse in March 2023

- Location within Cornwall
- 50.213391°N 5.480808°W
- Location: St Ives, Cornwall, England

Site notes
- Owner: Tate

Listed Building – Grade II
- Official name: Palais de Danse and southern boundary wall
- Designated: 29 April 2020
- Reference no.: 1468044

The Palais de Danse is a former cinema, dance hall, ballet school and auction house in St Ives, Cornwall which was a studio for sculptor and artist Barbara Hepworth from 1961 until her death in 1975. After her death, the Palais was kept by her family until it was donated to Tate in 2015. In 2020, Historic England designated it a Grade II listed building.

== Early uses ==
The property was originally an 18th-century stone cottage and part of the premises was used as a navigation school run by a cousin of John T. Short in the early 19th century. It was bought by Sir Christopher Hawkins in 1819 and by William Pole-Tylney-Long-Wellesley in 1834. The navigation school continued until at least 1893, and by the beginning of the 20th century most of the buildings on the site were falling into disrepair. In 1910, the site was redeveloped and turned into St Ives's first cinema, called The Picturedrome, which opened on 28 June 1911.

It was converted into a dance hall in 1925 (when it first became known as the Palais de Danse) and from 1939 was also used for auctions, concerts and, during the Second World War, a ballet school taught by Phyllis Bedells.

Hepworth bought Trewyn Studio at an auction at the Palais on 16 September 1949 "in face of terrific competition" in the words of Ben Nicholson. She bought it for £2,850 and, including fees, the total cost was just over £3,000. To make up the money, Hepworth had taken out a mortgage for £1,200, secured a loan on Nicholson's life insurance, and got money from her friends Helen Sutherland, Marcus Brumwell, and Cyril Reddihough.

The building would continue to be used for dances up until 1961, with Hepworth herself frequently dancing there on what was said to be the South West's best-sprung dance floor.

== As Hepworth's studio ==
By the time that the Palais came up for sale at the end of 1960, Hepworth had been looking for a space to work on her larger public commissions and had even been considering leaving St Ives. During her work on Meridian between 1958 and 1960, she had had to rent the upstairs of 18 Fore Street from the constituency Labour Party because her studio at Trewyn was not large enough. This experience had frustrated her due to the space lacking natural light and not being high enough. At 80 feet (24 m) long, the Palais was much larger than her studio at Trewyn; she bought the building on 25 February 1961 for £10,000, almost immediately beginning work on Winged Figure, a May 1961 commission for John Lewis' Oxford Street store.

After Winged Figure, Hepworth started work on Single Form, a commission for a memorial to Dag Hammarskjöld outside the United Nations headquarters in New York. It was her largest ever sculpture at 21 feet (6.4 m) tall, and had to be laid on the floor of the upper workshop in the Palais in order for Hepworth to work on it. To help with scaling up from the maquette (called Single Form (Memorial)), Hepworth enlisted the help of her son Simon Nicholson and used a chequered grid of 1 foot (0.30 m) squares. The grid and outline of Single Form still survive on the workshop's floor.

Other sculptures that were created in the Palais include Construction (Crucifixion), Theme and Variations, Squares with Two Circles and Four-Square (Walk Through).

Hepworth kept several parts of the dance hall, including the stage, but installed a sliding door inlaid with fibreglass and resin which allowed diffused light in from the next room which overlooked the sea. The large mirror on one wall of the Palais "encouraged an awareness of movement", and Hepworth would often put her sculptures on wheeled plinths to 'dance' them around the studio space. Edwin Mullins, who visited the Palais, said in 1966 that the first room upstairs was used for making plasters for casting into bronze; the plasterwork instruments were "all immaculately laid out on the work-bench", bags of dental plaster were laid on the floor, and wire mesh to make armatures was hung on the wall.

After she broke her femur in June 1967, Hepworth suffered from much more restricted mobility and was not able to use the Palais very much herself, doing most of her work back at Trewyn. From then until her death, the studio was mainly used as a display space and as workshops for Hepworth's assistants.

== After Hepworth's death ==
After Hepworth's death on 20 May 1975, the Palais was kept essentially as she had left it by her family. When Trewyn was opened as the Barbara Hepworth Museum in 1976, the Palais was unsuitable for public access and was used as a storeroom and a workshop space which was shared with Tate. All of Hepworth's prototypes and plasters were stored there, and sometimes displayed on the dance floor, until they were donated to The Hepworth Wakefield in 2011. In 2015, the Palais was donated to Tate who indicated their intention to restore it and open it to the public.

The building along with a southern boundary wall was designated Grade II listed by Historic England and the Department for Digital, Culture, Media and Sport on 29 April 2020. Heritage minister Nigel Huddleston said the listing was a "fitting tribute" to Hepworth "to preserve the unique site where she created some of her most famous works". In 2023, Tate announced a competition to restore and "reinvigorate" the building, with a completion date of 2026.

In July 2026, a stencil graffiti piece depicting Hepworth appeared on the side of the building, attributed to Bristol-based graffiti artist Stewy. Ten other smaller stencils of Hepworth on cardboard were also left around the town. Tate said that, after talking with the Hepworth estate, the stencil would be "left in place for now" while the gallery talked with Cornwall Council about "next steps".

=== Use by other artists ===
Between 1998 and 2000, sculptor Veronica Ryan undertook an artist's residency at the Palais, creating new works of art from some of Hepworth's unused marble. Ryan said she was anxious to not copy Hepworth's work, but found the Palais a "good environment in which to concentrate", describing Hepworth as a "friendly muse" and taking inspiration from her tools and materials. Two of the sculptures Ryan made, Quoit Montserrat and Mango Reliquary, are owned by Tate.

In 2015, Charlotte Moth photographed and filmed the studio's main hall for her Tate Britain display Choreography of the Image.
