= Single Form =

Series of sculptures by Barbara Hepworth

Coordinates: 40°44′57″N 73°58′08″W

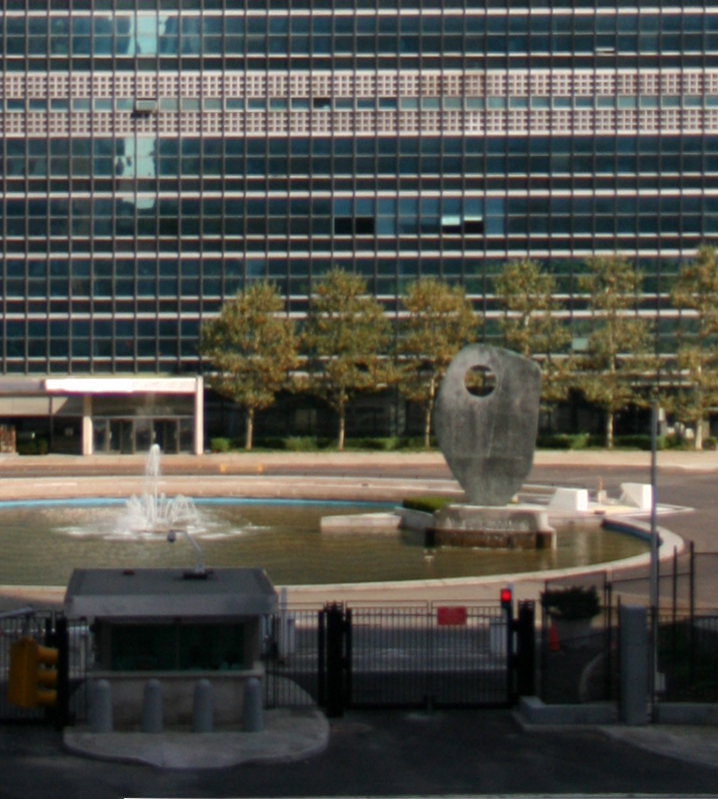
Hepworth's sculpture in the pool in front of the 39-story United Nations Secretariat Building in New York

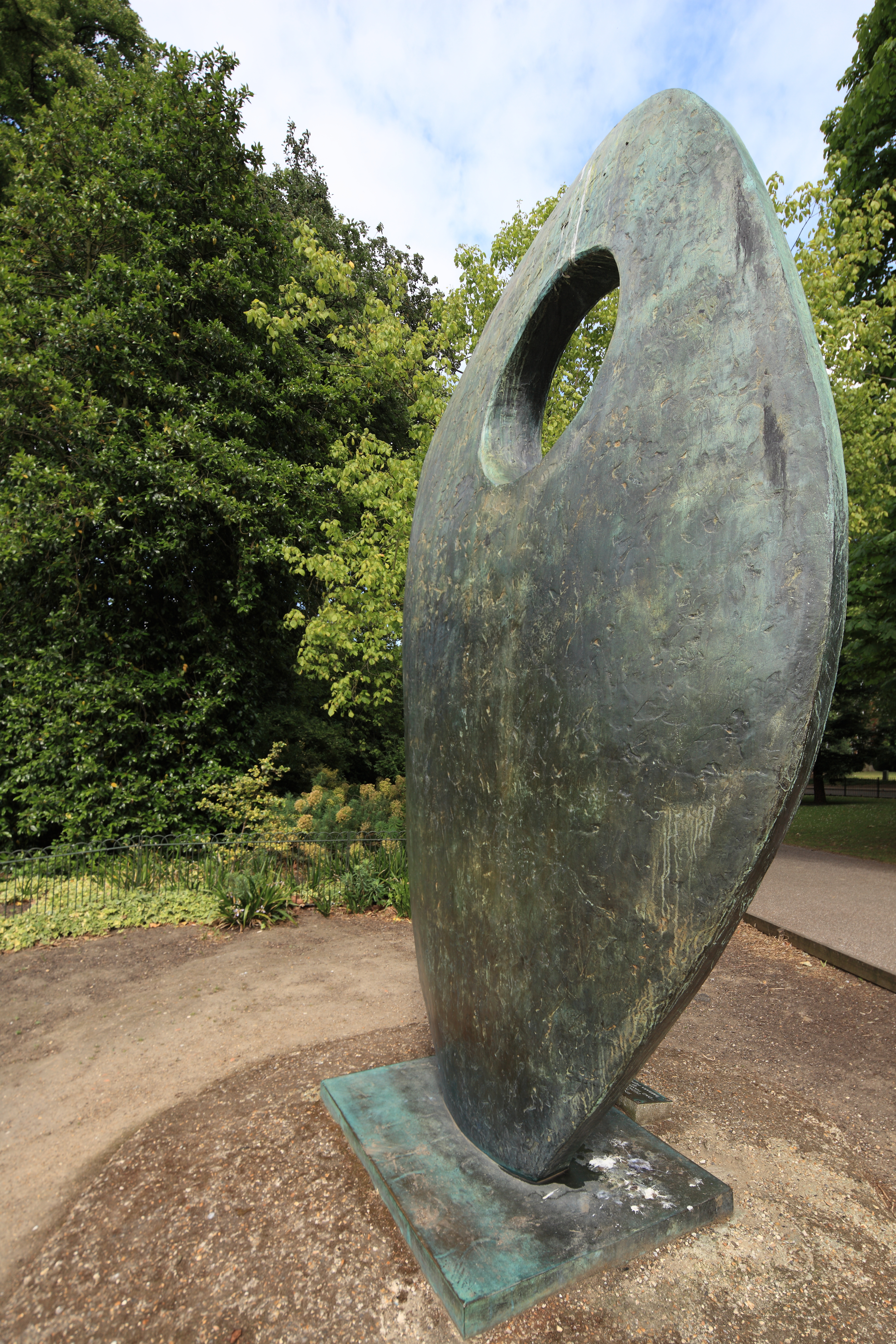
Single Form (Memorial) in Battersea Park

Single Form (BH 325) is a monumental bronze sculpture by the British artist Barbara Hepworth. It is her largest work, and one of her most prominent public commissions, displayed since 1964 in a circular water feature that forms a traffic island at the Headquarters of the United Nations in New York City, outside the United Nations Secretariat Building and the Dag Hammarskjöld Library. It is also the largest artwork cast by the Morris Singer foundry.

Copies of a smaller version, Single Form (Memorial) (BH 314), are on public display outside the Johns Hopkins University's Paul H. Nitze School of Advanced International Studies in Washington, D.C., and in Battersea Park in London. The version in Battersea Park was granted a Grade II* listing in January 2016.

== Description ==
The sculpture is a largely flat, irregular shape, broadly oval, pierced near the top by a circular hole. The flat surfaces are pitted and scored with three intersecting lines – one broadly vertical, and two broadly horizontal – on each face, reflecting its casting in separate pieces. In 1970, the art critic Edwin Mullins suggested: "it is a torso, it is a profile with an eye, it is an expanse of space in which the sun rises, it is a blade, it is a human hand ... raised flat in a sign of authority, or of salute, or as a gesture of allegiance". In 1974 the art critic Dore Ashton suggested it is a "vision of the cosmos".

== Background ==
The work was commissioned by the Jacob and Hilda Blaustein Foundation as a memorial to the UN Secretary General Dag Hammarskjöld after his death in an air crash in Africa in 1961. Jacob Blaustein had served as the United States delegate to the United Nations. Hammarskjöld was a collector of Hepworth's works, including her 1937–38 sandalwood sculpture Single Form (BH 103) which he displayed in his United Nations office (now in the Dag Hammarskjöld Museum at Backåkra in Sweden). He had discussed with Hepworth the possibility of her being commissioned for a work at the United Nations Headquarters. She may have started work, expecting a commission, before Hammarskjöld's death: the commission was formally ratified by the United Nations in September 1962.

== Sculpture ==
Hepworth had started work that led to the bronze in 1961. Single Form (Chûn Quoit) (BH 311) was cast in bronze in an edition of seven in 1961, with its shape marked with an inscribed circle. Her similar wood sculpture from 1961, Single Form (September) (BH 312), in figured walnut, has a circular depression on one face near the top. It is owned by the Tate Gallery and displayed at the Barbara Hepworth Museum in St Ives, Cornwall. Hepworth was working on the walnut sculpture when she received news of Hammarskjöld's death in September 1961, and named it after that month. Another related work is Hepworth's 1961 bronze Curved Form (Bryher II): a similar shape, pierced with a hole, with copper strings; an example was sold at auction at Christie's in 2013.

She moved the depression, which became a hole, in the larger 10 feet (3.0 m) high Single Form (Memorial) (BH 314) bronze from 1961. Single Form (September) and a plaster model of Single Form (Memorial) were included in the Hepworth exhibition at the Whitechapel Art Gallery in May–June 1962. (The year before, Hepworth had completed Meridian, and was working on Maquette (Three Forms in Echelon) for the John Lewis store on Oxford Street, which became Winged Figure.) The first completed bronze of Single Form (Memorial) was included in the open air sculpture exhibition at Battersea Park in 1963. This first cast was shipped to the US in October 1963 and retained by the Blaustein family until 2005, when it was donated to Johns Hopkins University and displayed at the Paul H. Nitze School of Advanced International Studies in Washington, D.C. A second cast was made in 1963, bought by London County Council for 6,000 guineas and installed at Battersea Park in 1964, where it remains on the south shore of the lake. It measures 3.12 by 2 by 0.25 metres (10.24 ft × 6.56 ft × 0.82 ft) .

Hepworth doubled the size of Single Form (Memorial) to create a full-size armature at the Palais de Danse annex to her studio in St Ives in early 1963, in wood covered with plaster. The full-size sculpture was cast in seven pieces and assembled at the Morris Singer foundry in London, the lines on the surface reflecting its casting. It measures 21 feet (6.4 m) high and weighs 5.5 tonnes (5.4 long tons; 6.1 short tons). It was erected in New York in May 1964, standing on a granite plinth near the edge of a circular pool of water, about 100 feet (30 m) in diameter, with a fountain, which had been built with a $50,000 gift from the children of the United States, Puerto Rico and the US Virgin Islands; it was unveiled on 11 June 1964.

== See also ==
- United Nations Art Collection
- List of public art in Wandsworth
