= Palais de Danse =

A palais de danse may refer to:

== Buildings ==
- A dance hall
- Palais de Danse, St Kilda, a dance hall in St Kilda, Melbourne, Victoria, Australia
- Palais de Danse, St Ives, a former cinema and dance hall in St Ives, Cornwall, England, UK
- PRYZM, Nottingham, a nightclub in Nottingham, England, formerly the Palais de Danse
- Hammersmith Palais, also known as Hammersmith Palais de Danse, a former dance hall and entertainment venue in Hammersmith, London
- Wattle Path Palais de Danse, a former dance hall, opened in 1923 in St Kilda, Victoria, Australia

== Other uses ==
- Palais de danse (film), a 1928 British film directed by Maurice Elvey
