= Paul Laib =

Paul Laib (1869 in Hamburg – 1958) was a naturalised British subject who worked as a fine art photographer in his residence at 3 Thistle Grove, Drayton Gardens, South Kensington, London.

== Biography ==
During the early decades of the twentieth century, the photographer Paul Laib made photographic records of paintings, drawings and sculpture for his artist clients. The majority of the photographs were taken whilst work was in the artists’ possession and there are some studio shots showing artists at work or posed for a portrait. Laib photographed works of all the major artists working in Britain between 1898 and 1950s, such as the society portraitists, Philip de László, John Singer Sargent and Oswald Birley, and young contemporaries such as John Piper, Barbara Hepworth and Ben Nicholson. The collection is significant in that it is largely unpublished, and shows prominent artists at work and pieces often prior to completion.

== Legacy ==
The complete archive of Paul Laib's glass plate negatives and ledgers passed to the Courtauld Institute of Art in 1974 and are presently being catalogued, digitised, re-sleeved and boxed as part of the Courtauld Connects project. The plate sizes range from 5 x 4 inch to 14 x 12 inch.
