= Four-Square (Walk Through) =

Bronze sculpture by Barbara Hepworth

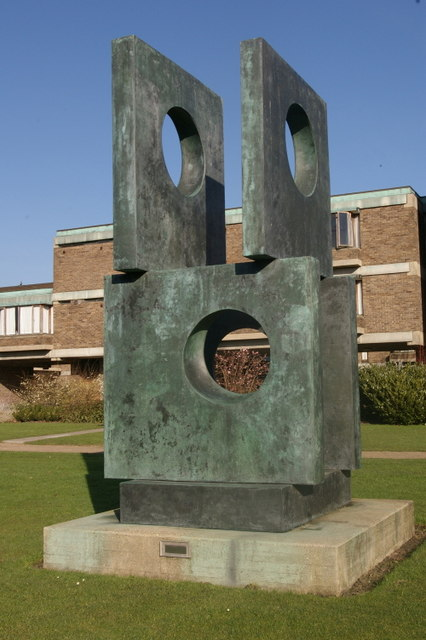
- Four-Square (Walk Through) at Churchill College, Cambridge
- Artist: Barbara Hepworth

Four-Square (Walk Through) (BH 433) is a 4.3 metres (14 ft) high bronze sculpture by British artist Barbara Hepworth. It was cast in 1966 in an edition of 3+1 (three casts for sale, plus one artist's copy). The four casts are displayed at the Barbara Hepworth Museum, the Norton Simon Museum, Churchill College, Cambridge, and the Mayo Clinic.

== Description ==
The large sculpture comprises five quadrilateral slab-like metal elements: a horizontal base, on which stand two thick parallel square slabs on edge, on which stand two similar parallel square slabs at right angles to the lower two. Each of the standing slabs is pierced off-centre by a round hole.

Although the five slabs are similar in appearance, each around 2 metres (6 ft 7 in) square, so approximately the height of a typical person, each differs slightly in its linear dimensions, convexity, and surface detail. One of each pair of the standing elements is slightly larger than the other, so they are arranged in echelon. The holes are not perfect circles, and they taper and change shape slightly through the thickness of the slabs. The interior and exterior surfaces have different patination - greenish outside, reddish within, particularly inside the holes. The holes may once have been polished and lacquered, to contrast with the dull exterior: they appear reflective in early photographs, but as the works are displayed outdoors they have also weathered.

Hepworth intended the viewer to engage directly with the sculpture, to notice the surface details and the differences between the pieces: literally, to walk around and through the sculpture. In comments published in 1971 by her son-in law, the art historian Alan Bowness, Hepworth agreed that part of the motivation for the monumental work was her diagnosis with cancer of the throat in 1965.

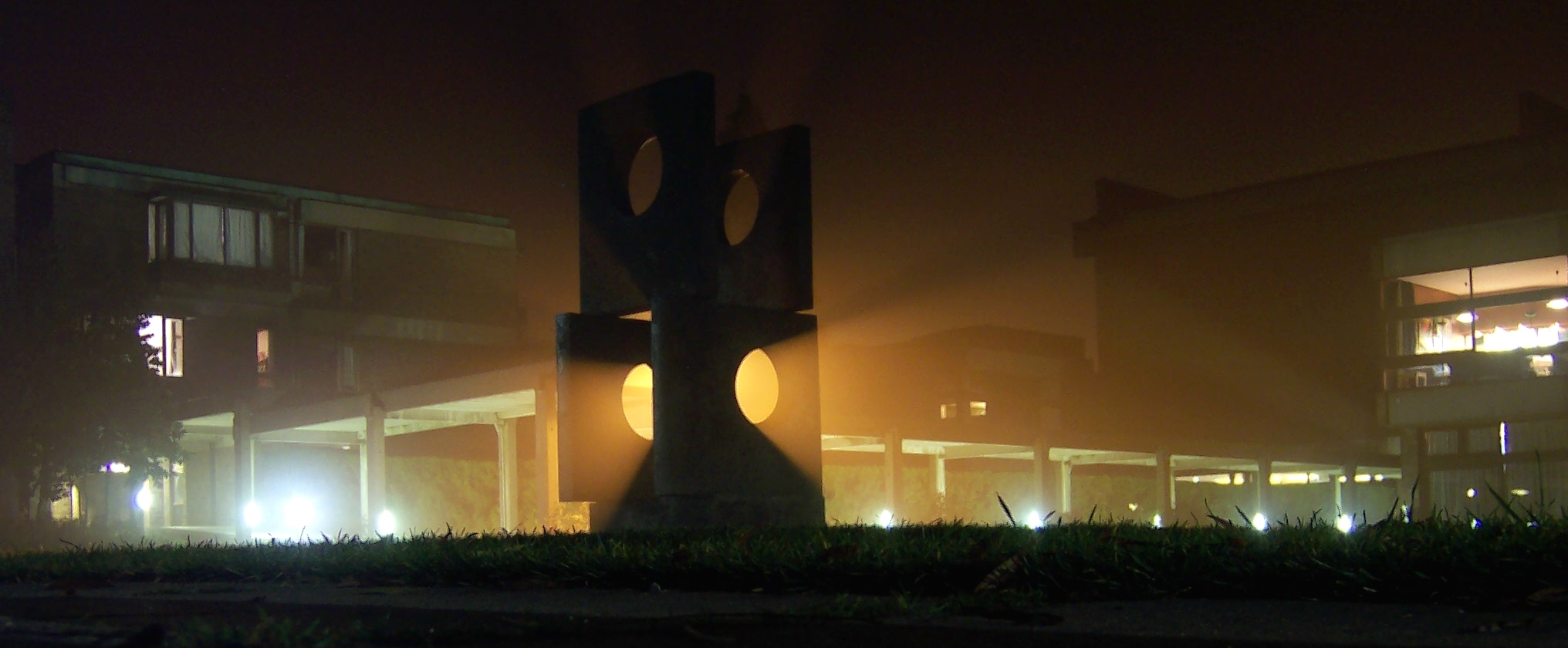
Churchill College

== Background ==
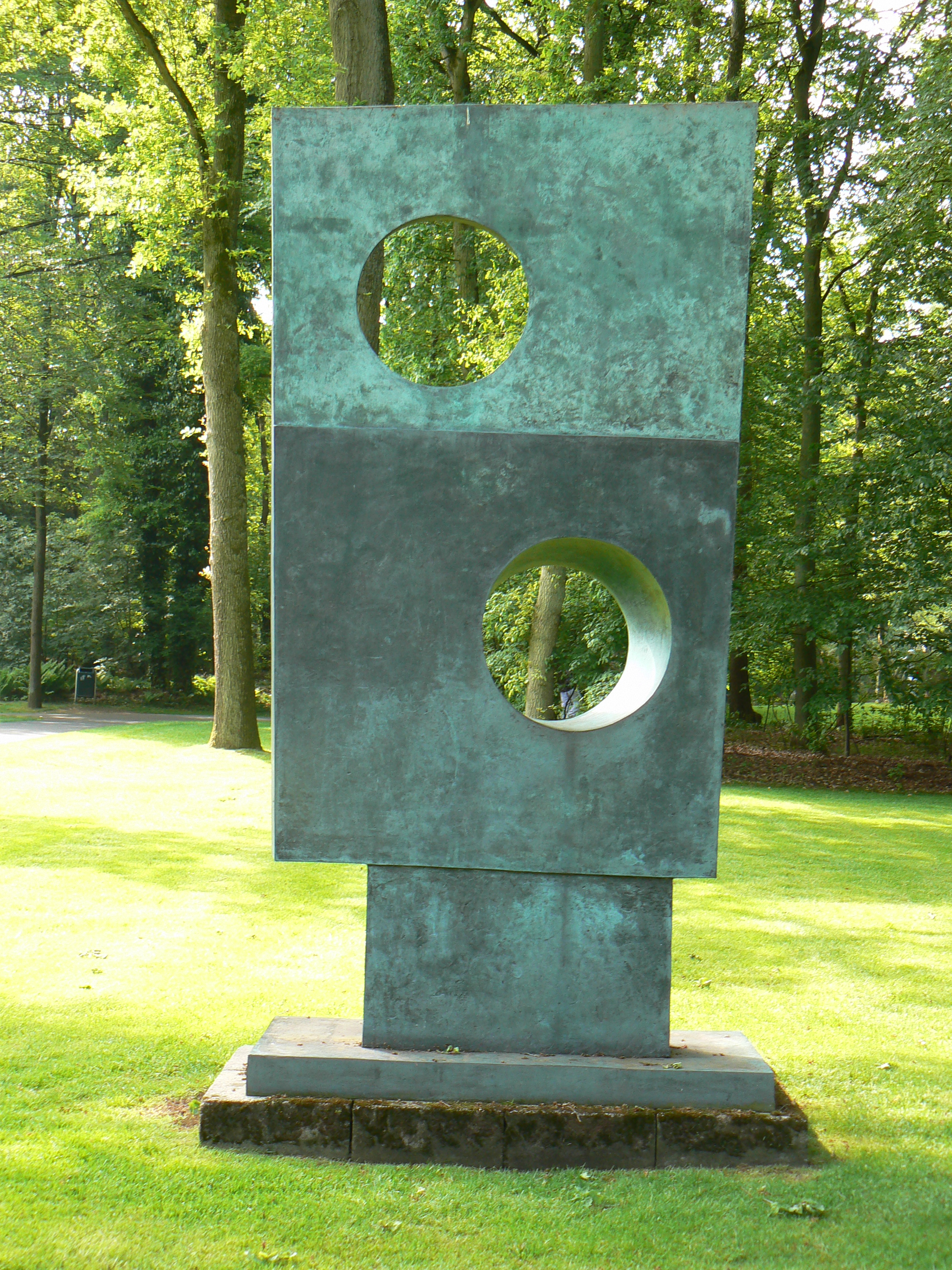
Squares with Two Circles

Unlike Henry Moore, Hepworth did not usually make maquettes - small preliminary studies of the composition - before proceeding to the full-size work. However, in this case, she made several smaller works on similar themes.

The sculpture develops the geometrical theme of quadrilateral planes pierced by circles from her 1963 bronze Squares with Two Circles (BH 347). Parallels can also be drawn to the abstract paintings and panel relief sculptures of Hepworth's former husband Ben Nicholson (they were divorced in 1951). In 1966 Hepworth made two slate sculptures, the 12 inches (30 cm) high Maquette for Large Sculpture: Four-Square (Four Circles) (BH 407) in an edition of 3, and then the unique 24 inches (61 cm) high Four-Square (Four Circles) (BH 416). The larger slate sculpture was cast in bronze in 1966 as Four-Square (Four Circles) (BH 428) in an edition of "7+1" (seven casts for sale and one artist's model).

Scaling up these smaller sculptures, Hepworth made a plaster model of the full-size sculpture, 4.29 by 1.99 by 2.295 metres (14.07 ft × 6.53 ft × 7.53 ft), on an aluminium armature. The five slab-like elements were then cast separately in bronze by the Morris Singer foundry in London. The separate pieces were welded together to create the completed sculpture, in an edition of "3+1" (three casts for sale, plus one artist's copy).

The artist's copy (0/3) is owned by the Hepworth estate, and is displayed on loan in the gardens of the Barbara Hepworth Museum in St Ives, Cornwall. Cast 1 has been held by the Norton Simon Museum in Pasadena since 1969. Cast 2 has been displayed in the grounds of Churchill College, Cambridge since 1968, where students are encouraged to walk or with within the work; it was allocated to the Fitzwilliam Museum in 2000, after being accepted in lieu of inheritance tax by the Department for Culture, Media and Sport, from the estate of the artist. Cast 3 was donated to the Mayo Clinic in Rochester, Minnesota in 1979, as a memorial for Constantine P. Goulandris, member of the Greek shipping dynasty that included Basil Goulandris and Nikos Goulandris.

An example of the 12 inches (30 cm) slate maquette was put on sale at Bonhams in 2003, estimated at £40,000 to £60,000, but failed to sell. An example was sold in England in 2009 for £60,000, and resold in at Deutscher and Hackett in Australia in 2014 for AUS$348,000. An example of the 24 inches (610 mm) bronze Four-square (Four circles) was sold at Christie's in 2010 for US$314,500, and one at Sotheby's in 2017 for £488,750.
