= Winged Figure =

Sculpture by Barbara Hepworth

- BH 315
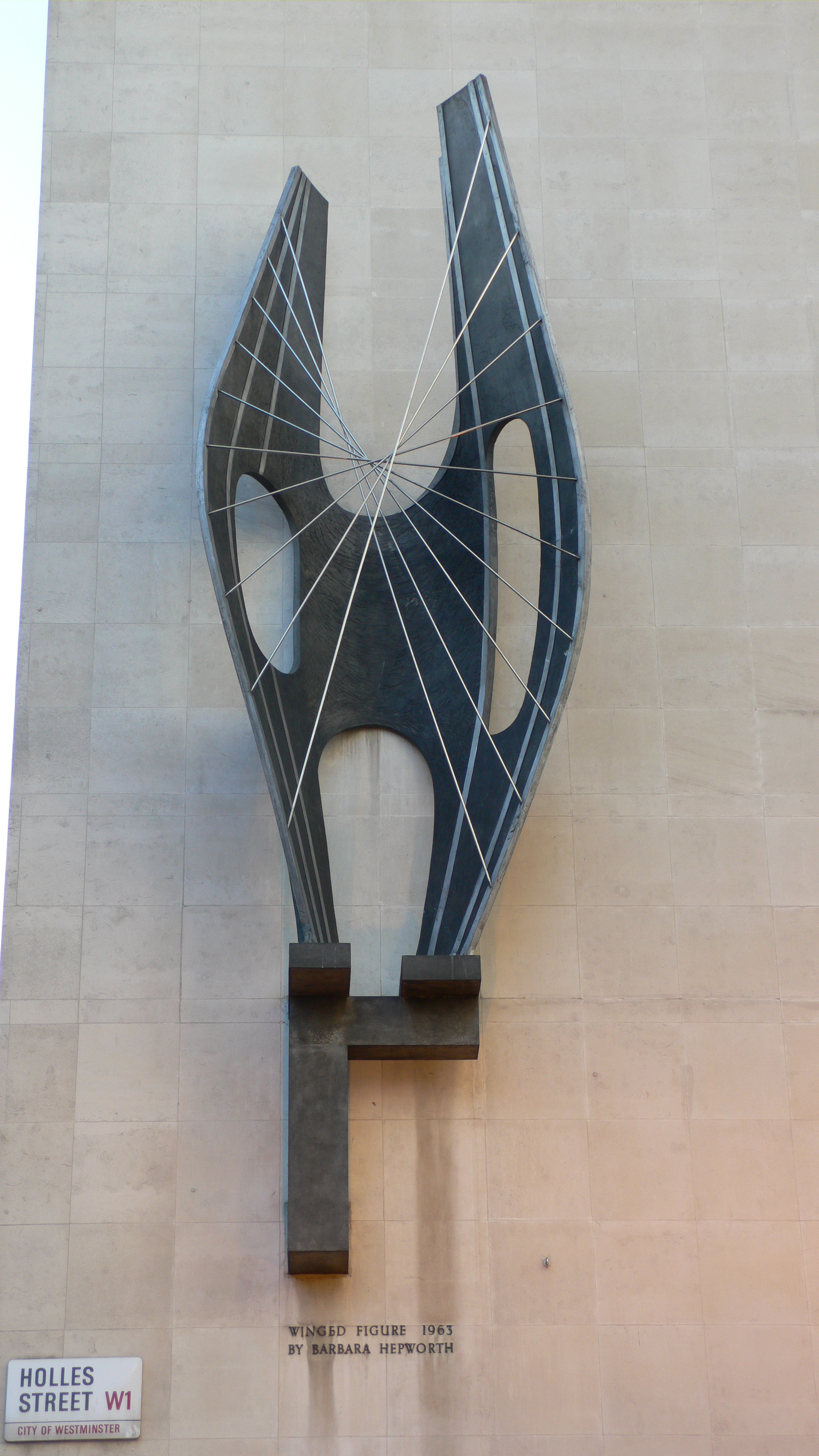
- Artist: Barbara Hepworth
- Year: 1963
- Dimensions: 5.8 m (19 ft)
- Designation: Grade II* listed building
- Location: City of Westminster, United Kingdom; 51°30′54″N 0°08′40″W

Winged Figure (BH 315) is a 1963 sculpture by British artist Barbara Hepworth. One of Hepworth's best known works, it has been displayed in London since April 1963, on Holles Street near the junction with Oxford Street, mounted on the south-east side of the John Lewis department store. It is estimated that the sculpture is seen by approximately 200 million people each year.

It was granted a Grade II* listing in January 2016.

== Background ==
The new John Lewis store on Oxford Street replaced earlier war-damaged premises. The building was designed by architects Slater & Uren in 1956 and reopened in 1961.

John Lewis originally approached Jacob Epstein to create a sculpture to decorate the plain Portland stone side wall of the new store, but he declined as he was engaged on other commissions. Instead, in May 1961, John Lewis asked six other artists to propose designs. In addition to Hepworth – whose breakthrough public sculpture, Meridian, had recently been installed outside State House on Holborn – the others were Ralph Brown, Geoffrey Clarke, Tony Hollaway, Stefan Knapp, William Mitchell and Hans Tisdall. None of their initial designs was accepted.

Hepworth had been asked to express "the idea of common ownership and common interests in a partnership of thousands of workers" and in October 1961 Hepworth had proposed a different design, Three Forms in Echelon, but John Lewis rejected it. One of ten bronze maquettes of Three Forms in Echelon (BH 306) cast in 1965 (nine numbered casts plus one for the artist) is now held by the Tate Gallery.

Her second proposal, based on an enlargement of her 1957 sculpture Winged Figure I (BH 228), was accepted. Related sculptures by Hepworth, such as Stringed Figure (Curlew) and Orpheus, were also made in sheet metal with rods.

== Design ==
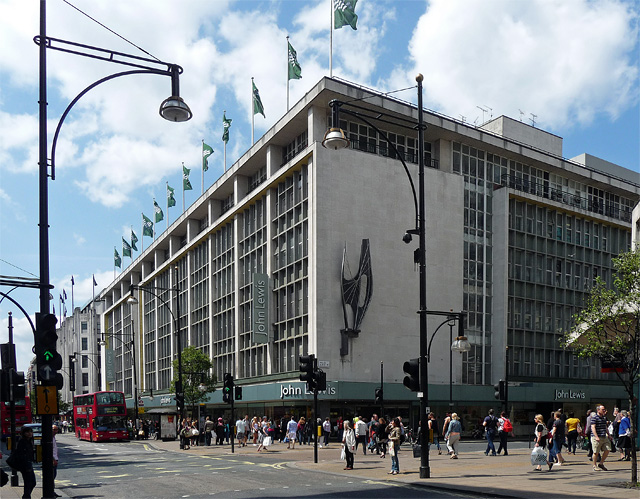
Winged Figure in 2011

The work stands 5.8 metres (19 ft) high, resembling a boat's hull, with two wide asymmetric wings like blades rising from a small plinth, curving towards each other and linked to each other by a series of radial rods like strings that almost cross at a single point in the middle of the sculpture.

Winged Figure was the first sculpture Hepworth created in her Palais de Danse studio. She made a prototype in 1962 in wood and then aluminium in St Ives, constructed from lengths of aluminium covered with aluminium sheets and linked by ten aluminium rods. The surface of the prototype was then textured with Isopon, a polyester resin filler. The aluminium prototype – the largest prototype by Hepworth still in existence – is now held by the Hepworth Museum in Wakefield, Yorkshire.

The main body of the final work was cast in aluminium by the founders Morris Singer in Walthamstow, with the rods replaced by stainless steel. It was installed on the John Lewis building on Sunday, 21 April 1963, on a plinth 13 feet (4.0 m) above the pavement. It was refurbished for its 50th anniversary in 2013.

A brass maquette for Winged Figure (BH 227) made in 1957 was sold at Christie's in November 2012 for $422,500.
