= Meridian (Hepworth) =

Sculpture by Barbara Hepworth

Coordinates: 41°2′0.1″N 73°41′35.7″W

Meridian (BH 250) is a bronze sculpture by British artist Barbara Hepworth. It is an early example of her public commissions, commissioned for State House, a new 16-storey office block constructed at 66–71 High Holborn, London, in the early 1960s. The sculpture was made in 1958–59, and erected in 1960. When the building was demolished in 1992, the sculpture was sold and moved to the Donald M. Kendall Sculpture Gardens in Purchase, New York.

The sculpture resembles a distorted spiral with ribbons of bronze forming triangular loops. Hepworth intended the fluid lines of the sculpture to contrast with the rigidity of the building's rectilinear architecture. The title of the work refers either to an imaginary line of longitude (like the Greenwich meridian), or to the highest point reached by the Sun. It was influenced by Tachism, a French style of abstract art, and it may have been inspired by a work titled 1953, August 11 (meridian) painted a few years before by Hepworth's former second husband, the artist Ben Nicholson.

Earlier in her career, Hepworth preferred to work directly in wood and stone, but from the mid-1950s she started to work more indirectly in bronze using preparatory models. In 1958, Lilian Somerville of the British Council was organising an exhibition at the São Paulo Art Biennial in late 1959 (where Hepworth would win the Grand Prix). Somerville suggested Hepworth to the architect Harold Mortimer from Trehearne & Norman Preston & Partners responsible for State House; he had been considering other sculptors, including Lynn Chadwick. Mortimer commissioned Hepworth to create a sculpture to fill a space near the main entrance of the new building.

She made a first maquette – a plaster model (BH 245) – and then a second maquette – Maquette (Variation on a Theme) (BH 247) – each of which was later cast in bronze in an edition of 9. She moved on to a one-third scale model, Garden Sculpture (Model for Meridian) (BH 246), 59.25 inches (1,505 mm) high, made using an armature of expanded aluminium covered with plaster, cast in an edition of 6 by Morris Singer in 1960. Finally, from 1958, she constructed a full-size armature in wood at Lanham's Sale Rooms near her Trewyn Studio in St Ives, Cornwall, which was covered with plaster by early 1959. A unique example was cast in bronze in several pieces and then assembled at the Susse Frères foundry in Paris later in 1959, and erected in London in 1960, standing in front of a curved guarding wall of Cornish granite beside the main entrance to State House. The full-size sculpture stands 15 feet (4.6 m) high (46 metres). It was unveiled in March 1960 by Sir Philip Hendy, then Director of the National Gallery.

Hepworth made relatively little profit on the unique full-size sculpture, defrayed by selling bronzes of the maquettes, but the success of the sculpture led to the commission for Winged Figure, still displayed outside the John Lewis building in Oxford Street.

When State House was demolished in 1992 to make way for MidCity Place, the sculpture was sold and moved to the Donald M. Kendall Sculpture Gardens at the world headquarters of PepsiCo in Purchase, New York (which also has an example of her 1970 sculpture Family of Man).
