= Backåkra =

Coordinates: 55.389°N 14.13°E

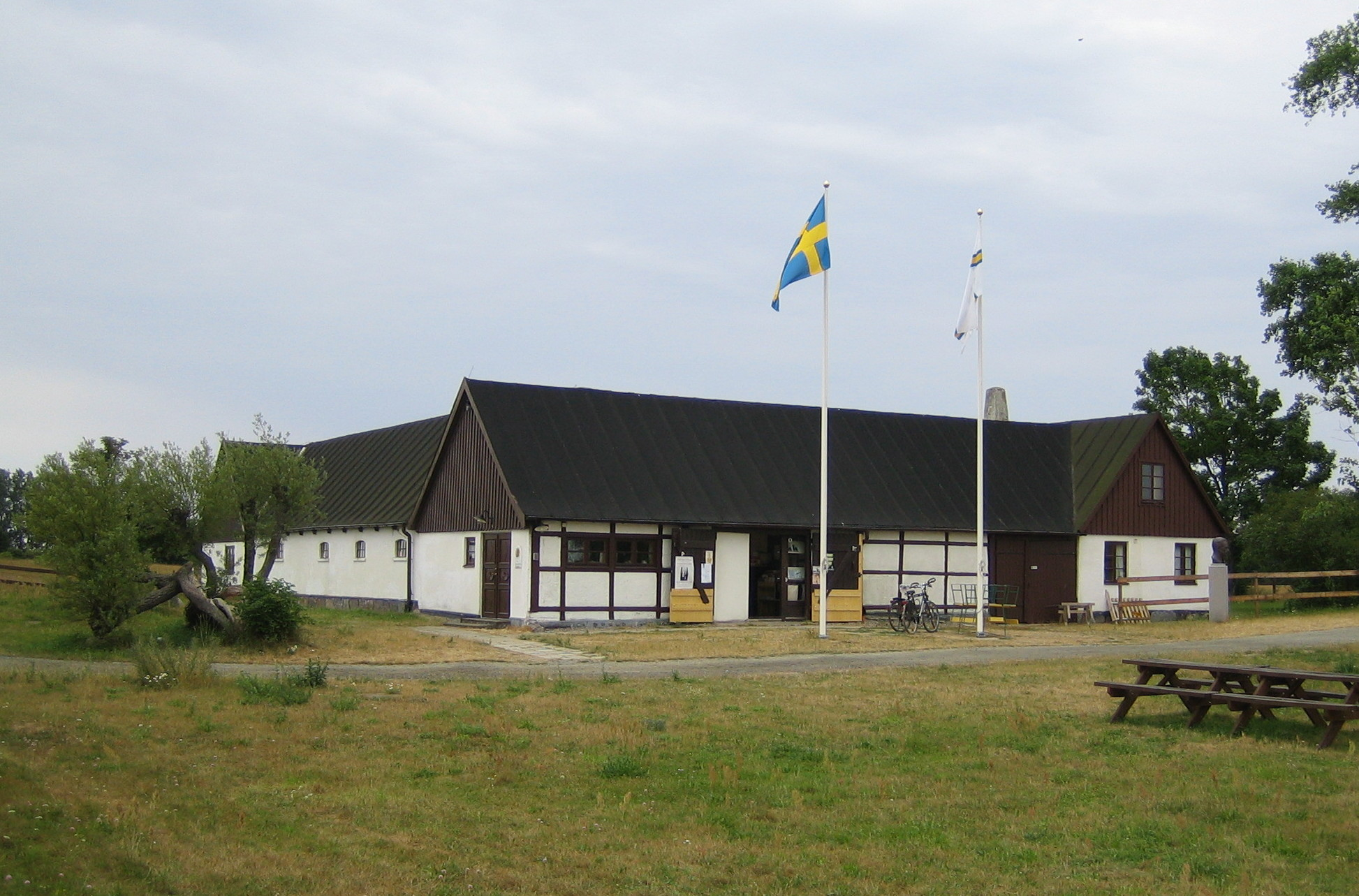
Dag Hammarskjöld's farm, Backåkra.

Dag Hammarskjöld's farm Backåkra (Swedish: [ˈbǎkːɔkra]), close to Ystad in southern Sweden, was bought in 1957 as a summer residence by Hammarskjöld, then Secretary-General of the United Nations (1953-1961). The farm was in decline and its restoration came to last until after Hammarskjöld's death in 1961. It was maintained by the Swedish Tourist Association, as a museum displaying his belongings and art, furniture, gifts and more - many from his time at the UN. The south wing of the farm was reserved as a summer retreat for the 18 members of the Swedish Academy, of which Hammarskjöld was a member. There is an outdoor meditation site on the beautiful property of 74 acres, which is a nature reserve. Today, the house is owned by Dag Hammarskjölds Backåkra Foundation and contains a museum, conference, small café and book shop.

Backåkra is the name of the farm itself, but also the name of the village to which the farmstead belongs. Due to the 1803 land reform in Scania, farms were moved out of the village with the result that Backåra is now chiefly a land register. Its local school, the folkskola, is today a summer hostel run by the Swedish Hiking Association. The lands of the village are situated less than a mile from the shores of the Baltic in the Österlen area of Scania. Known for its summer cottages and outdoor recreation, the area is popular with tourists.

In April 2018, the United Nations Security Council held a unique meeting at Backåkra. They very rarely have meetings outside the UN headquarters in New York.
