= Barbara Hepworth =

English artist and sculptor (1903–1975)

Dame Barbara Hepworth DBE
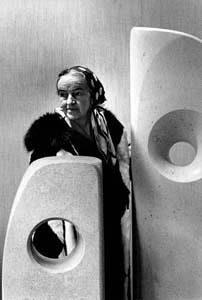
- Hepworth in 1966
- Born: Jocelyn Barbara Hepworth; 10 January 1903; Wakefield, West Riding of Yorkshire, England
- Died: 20 May 1975 (aged 72); St Ives, Cornwall, England
- Education: Wakefield Girls' High School; Leeds School of Art; Royal College of Art
- Known for: Sculpture
- Movement: Modernism, abstract art
- Spouses: John Skeaping (m. 1925; div. 1933) Ben Nicholson (m. 1938; div. 1951)
- Children: 4, including Simon Nicholson
- Website: www.barbarahepworth.org.uk

Dame Jocelyn Barbara Hepworth (10 January 1903 – 20 May 1975) was an English sculptor. Her work exemplifies Modernism and in particular modern sculpture. Along with artists such as Ben Nicholson and Naum Gabo, Hepworth was a leading figure in the colony of artists who resided in St Ives during the Second World War.

Born in Wakefield, Yorkshire, Hepworth studied at Leeds School of Art and the Royal College of Art in the 1920s. She married the sculptor John Skeaping in 1925. In 1931 she fell in love with the painter Ben Nicholson, and in 1933 divorced Skeaping. At this time she was part of a circle of modern artists centred on Hampstead, London, and was one of the founders of the art movement Unit One.

At the beginning of the Second World War Hepworth and Nicholson moved to St Ives, Cornwall, where she would remain for the rest of her life. Best known as a sculptor, Hepworth also produced drawings – including a series of sketches of operating rooms following the hospitalisation of her daughter in 1944 – and lithographs. She died in a fire at her studio in 1975.

== Biography ==
=== Early life ===
Jocelyn Barbara Hepworth was born on 10 January 1903 in Wakefield, West Riding of Yorkshire, the eldest child of Gertrude and Herbert Hepworth. Her father was a civil engineer for the West Riding County Council, who in 1921 advanced to the role of county surveyor. Hepworth attended Wakefield Girls' High School, where she was awarded music prizes at the age of 12 and won a scholarship to study at the Leeds School of Art from 1920. It was there that she met her fellow Yorkshireman, Henry Moore. They became friends and established a friendly rivalry that lasted professionally for many years.

Despite the difficulties of attempting to gain a position in what was a male-dominated environment, Hepworth successfully won a county scholarship to attend the Royal College of Art (RCA) in London and studied there from 1921 until she was awarded the diploma of the Royal College of Art in 1924.

=== Early career ===
Barbara Hepworth, Pierced Form, 1932 (pink alabaster, original destroyed c. 1944)

Following her studies at the RCA, Hepworth travelled to Florence, Italy, in 1924 on a West Riding Travel Scholarship. Hepworth was also the runner-up for the Prix-de-Rome, which the sculptor John Skeaping won. After travelling with him to Siena and Rome, Hepworth married Skeaping in May 1925 in Florence. In Italy, Hepworth learned how to carve marble from sculptor Giovanni Ardini. Hepworth and Skeaping returned to London in 1926, where they exhibited their works together from their flat. Their son Paul was born in London in 1929. In 1931, Hepworth met and fell in love with abstract painter Ben Nicholson; however, both were still married at the time. Hepworth filed for divorce from Skeaping that year; they were divorced in March 1933.

Her early work was highly interested in abstraction and art movements on the continent. In 1931, Hepworth was the first to sculpt the pierced figures that are characteristic of both her own work and, later, that of Henry Moore. They would lead in the path to modernism in sculpture. In 1933, Hepworth travelled with Nicholson to France, where they visited the studios of Jean Arp, Pablo Picasso, and Constantin Brâncuși. Hepworth later became involved with the Paris-based art movement, Abstraction-Création. In 1933, Hepworth co-founded the Unit One art movement with Nicholson and Paul Nash, the critic Herbert Read, and the architect Wells Coates. The movement sought to unite Surrealism and abstraction in British art.

Hepworth also helped raise awareness of continental artists amongst the British public. In 1937, she designed the layout for Circle: An International Survey of Constructivist Art, a 300-page book that surveyed Constructivist artists and that was published in London and edited by Nicholson, Naum Gabo, and Leslie Martin.

Hepworth, with Nicholson, gave birth to triplets in 1934: Rachel, Sarah, and Simon. Hepworth, atypically, found a way to both take care of her children and continue producing her art. "A woman artist", she argued, "is not deprived by cooking and having children, nor by nursing children with measles (even in triplicate) – one is in fact nourished by this rich life, provided one always does some work each day; even a single half hour, so that the images grow in one's mind." Hepworth married Nicholson on 17 November 1938 at Hampstead Register Office in north London, following his divorce from his wife Winifred. Rachel and Simon also became artists.

=== St Ives ===
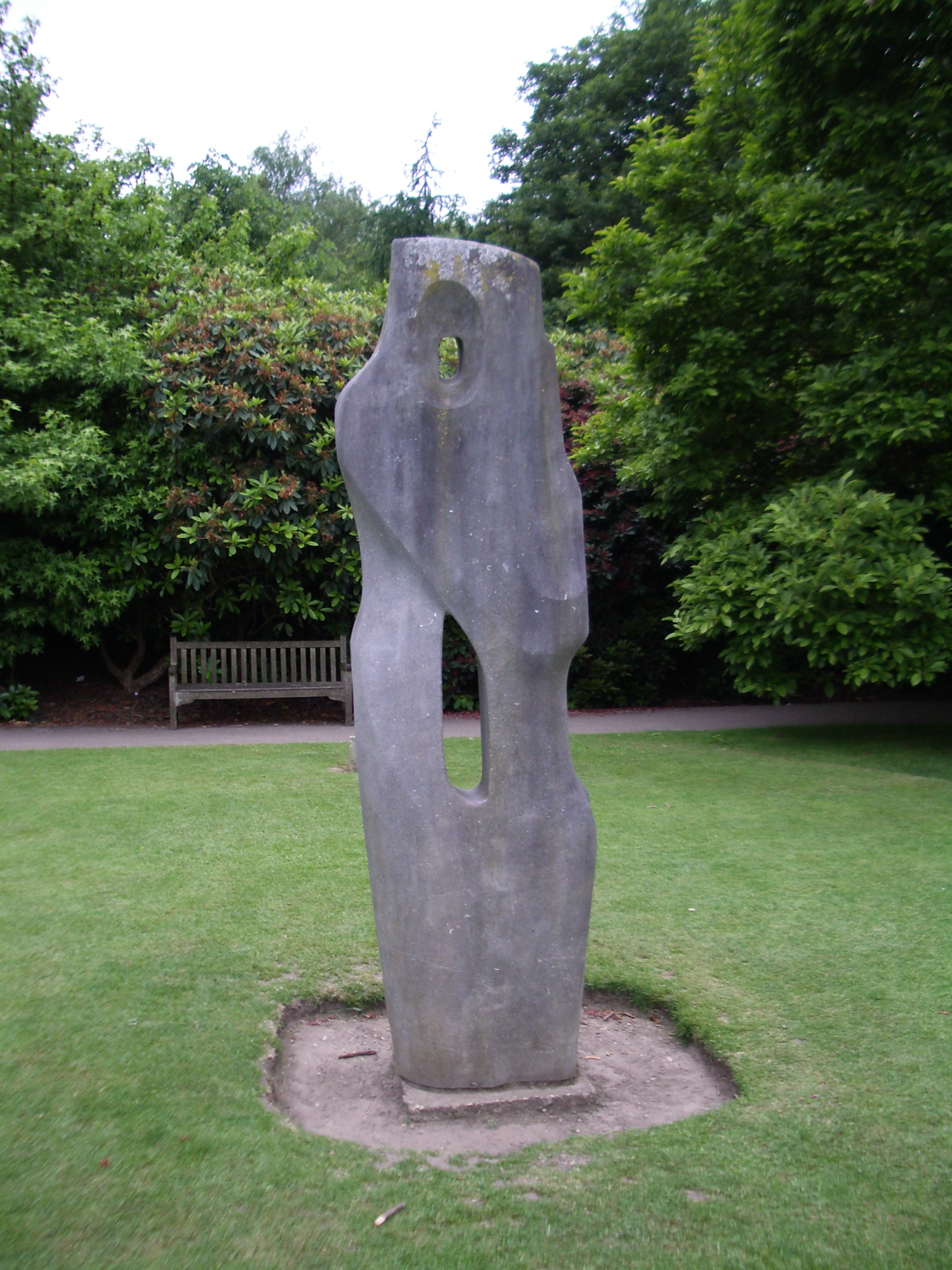
Monolith-Empyrean, 1953.

Hepworth, Nicholson and their children went to live in Cornwall at the outbreak of the Second World War in 1939. She lived in Trewyn Studios in St Ives from 1949 until her death in 1975. Trewyn Studios had once been an outbuilding of Trewyn House, later purchased by her pupil and assistant John Milne in 1956. She said that "Finding Trewyn Studio was sort of magic. Here was a studio, a yard, and garden where I could work in open air and space." St Ives had become a refuge for many artists during the war. On 8 February 1949, Hepworth and Nicholson co-founded the Penwith Society of Arts at the Castle Inn; 19 artists were founding members, including Peter Lanyon and Bernard Leach.

Hepworth was also a skilled draughtsperson. After her daughter Sarah was hospitalised in 1944, she struck up a close friendship with the surgeon Norman Capener. At Capener's invitation, she was invited to view surgical procedures and, between 1947 and 1949, she produced nearly 80 drawings of operating rooms in chalk, ink, and pencil. Hepworth was fascinated by the similarities between surgeons and artists, stating: "There is, it seems to me, a close affinity between the work and approach of both physicians and surgeons, and painters and sculptors."

In 1950, works by Hepworth were exhibited in the British Pavilion at the XXV Venice Biennale alongside works by Matthew Smith and John Constable. The 1950 Biennale was the last time that contemporary British artists were exhibited alongside artists from the past. Two early public commissions, Contrapunctal Forms and Turning Forms, were exhibited at the Festival of Britain in 1951.

During this period, Hepworth and Nicholson divorced (1951). Hepworth moved away from working only in stone or wood and began to work with bronze and clay. Hepworth often used her garden in St Ives, which she designed with her friend the composer Priaulx Rainier, to view her large-scale bronzes.

==== Death of her son Paul ====
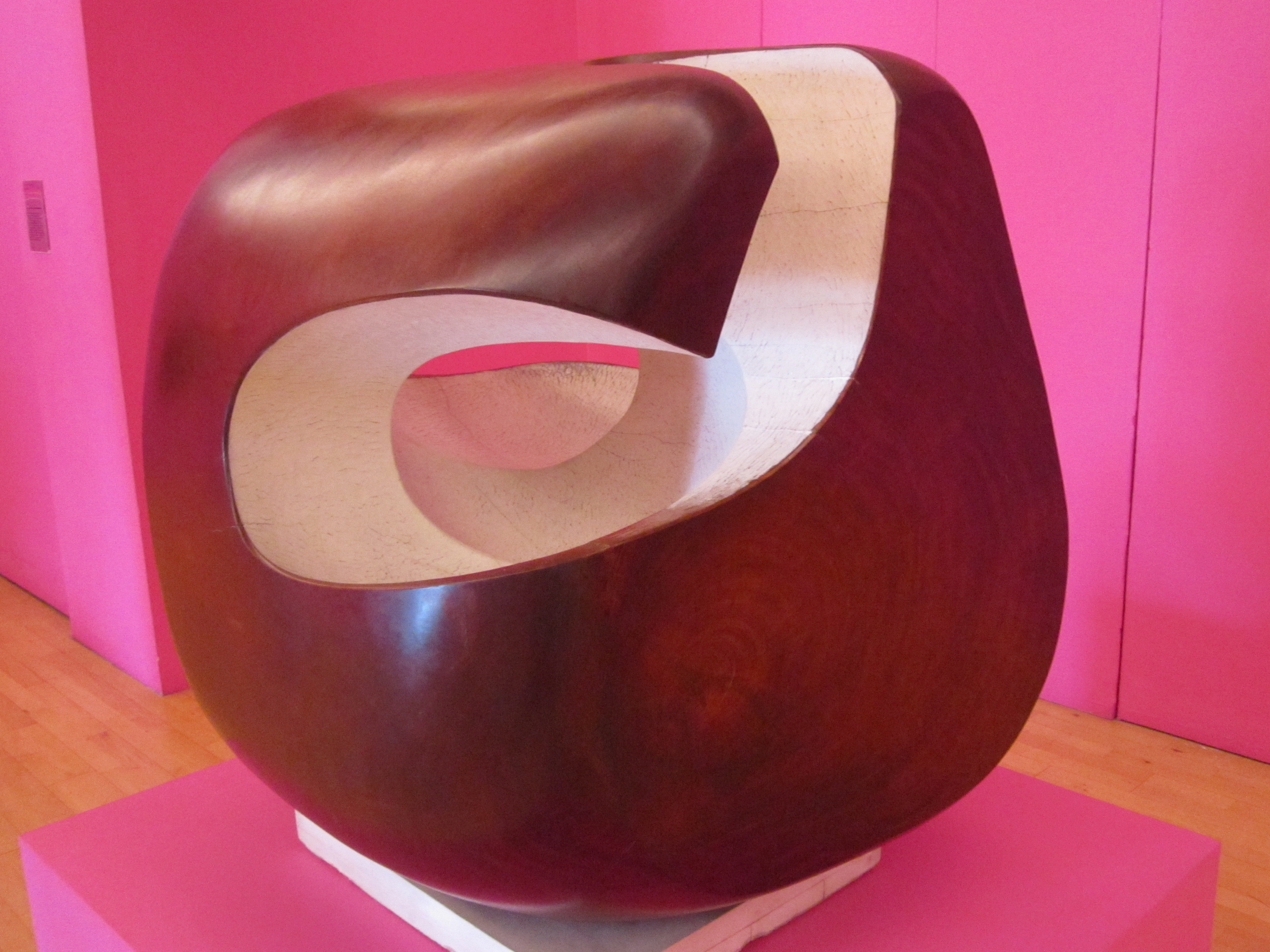
Corinthos (sculpted in guarea wood), 1954–55, at Tate Liverpool.

Her eldest son Paul was killed on 13 February 1953 in a plane crash while serving with the Royal Air Force in Thailand. A memorial to him, Madonna and Child, is in the parish church of St Ives.

Exhausted, in part from her son's death, Hepworth travelled to Greece with her friend Margaret Gardiner in August 1954. They visited Athens, Delphi and many of the Aegean Islands.

When Hepworth returned to St Ives from Greece in August 1954 she found that Gardiner had sent her a large shipment of Nigerian guarea hardwood. Although she received only a single tree trunk, Hepworth noted that the shipment from Nigeria to the Tilbury docks came in at 17 tons. Between 1954 and 1956 Hepworth sculpted six pieces out of guarea wood, many of which were inspired by her trip to Greece, such as Corinthos (1954) and Curved Form (Delphi) (1955).

=== Ambivalent burden of international reputation ===
It was also during this decade that Hepworth became preoccupied with the idea of establishing a market base for her work in the United States. Initially she hoped to follow Henry Moore's successful sale of artwork via Curt Valentin of Bucholz Gallery in New York. Negotiations with Valentin did result in a number of American sales, but despite the sales, and despite interventions by Hepworth's friends, Valentin rebuffed repeated requests to hold any substantial stock of her work. It was not until 1955, after the Martha Jackson Gallery had offered Hepworth the opportunity to exhibit in their space alongside works by William Scott and Francis Bacon, that Hepworth formalised gallery representation in the new world.

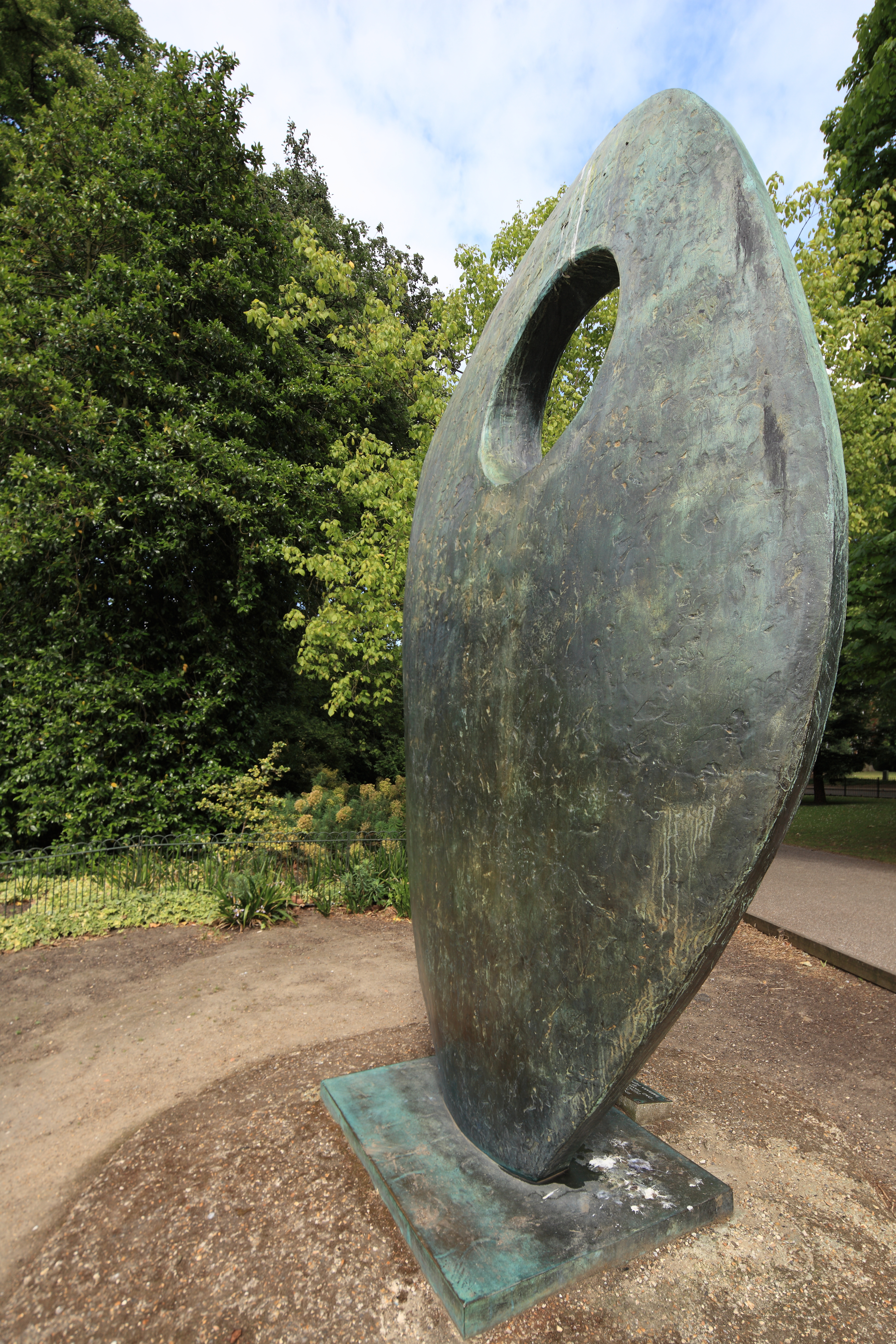
Single Form (Memorial) at Battersea Park, London.

Hepworth's difficulties in establishing a stable gallery relationship in the United States have been attributed to many factors, including the artist's own diffidence regarding personal promotion of her work. When Martha Jackson failed to arrange the solo American exhibition of sculptures and drawings that Hepworth demanded, Hepworth moved, in 1957, to Galerie Chalette, run by Arthur and Madeleine Lejwa, known for their close relationship with Jean Arp, and dedication to close relationships with their artists.

The Lejwas came through with the solo exhibition Hepworth craved. Hepworth came to New York for the opening (her first visit to the city), but made minimal contact with the press and left as soon as possible. "Have seen all the press", she wrote, "pulled faces at the camera and generally done my best!"

Three years later, having secured the Dag Hammarskjöld Memorial Commission (Single Form, 1964), she left both Chalette and Gimpel Fils, her long-time home agent, for the larger Marlborough Fine Art and Marlborough-Gerson. "Pulled between personal loyalties and professional aspirations", Hepworth chose to forfeit the personal relationships.

=== Late career ===
Hepworth greatly increased her studio space in 1960 when she purchased the Palais de Danse, a former cinema and dance hall, that was situated across the street from Trewyn. She used this new space to work on large-scale commissions.

She also experimented with lithography in her late career, and produced two lithographic suites with the Curwen Gallery and its director Stanley Jones, one in 1969 and one in 1971. The latter was entitled "The Aegean Suite" (1971) and was inspired by Hepworth's trip to Greece in 1954 with Margaret Gardiner. The artist also produced a set of lithographs entitled "Opposing Forms" (1970) with Marlborough Fine Art in London.

Barbara Hepworth died in an accidental fire at her Trewyn studios on 20 May 1975 at the age of 72.

== Famous sculptures ==
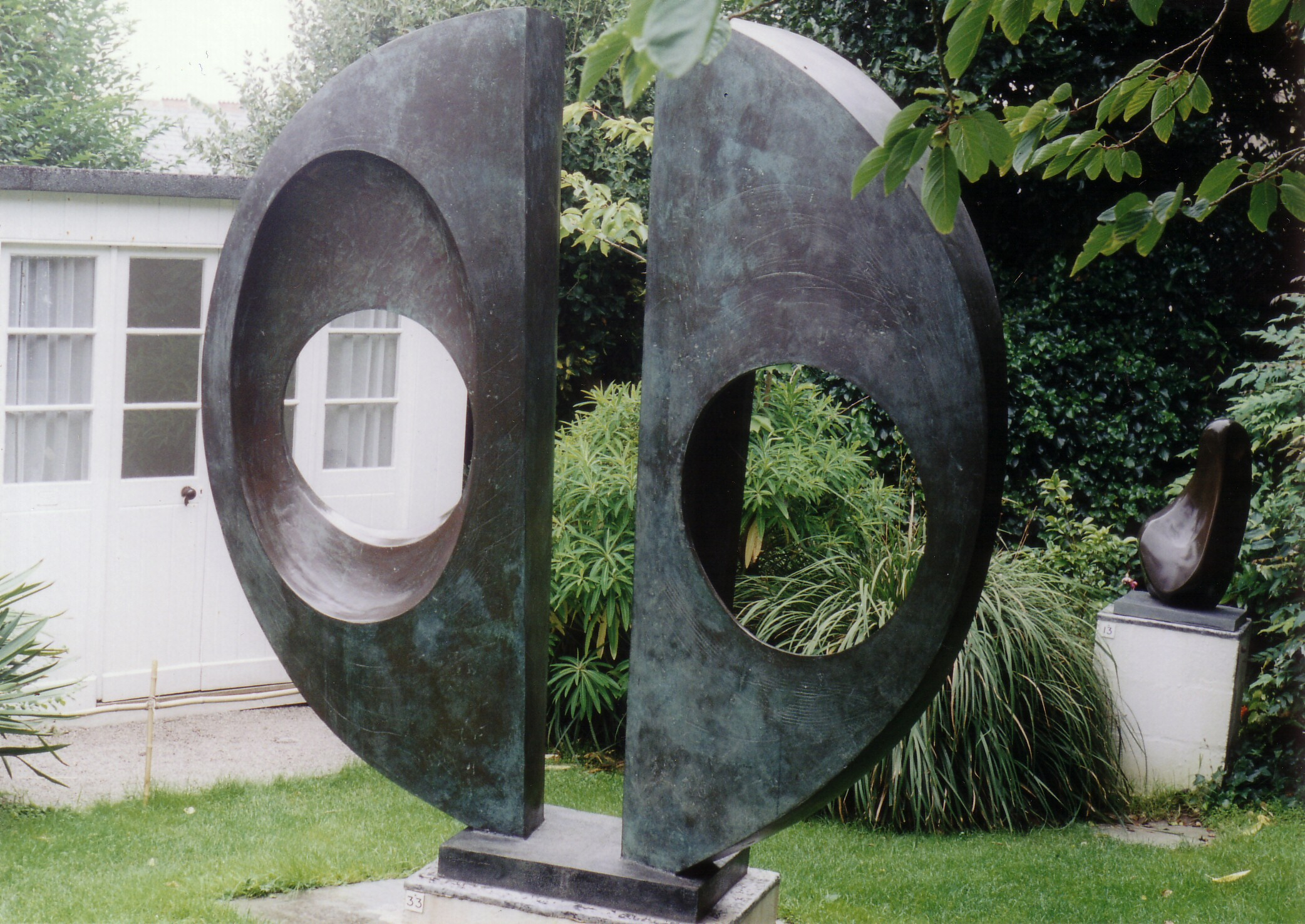
Two Forms (Divided Circle), 1969, St Ives.

In 1951 Hepworth was commissioned by the Arts Council to create a piece for the Festival of Britain. The resulting work featured two Irish limestone figures entitled, "Contrapuntal Forms" (1950), which was displayed on London's South Bank; it was later donated to the New Town of Harlow and displayed in Glebelands, where it remains. To complete the large-scale piece Hepworth hired her first assistants, Terry Frost, Denis Mitchell, and John Wells.

From 1949 onwards she worked with assistants, 16 in all. One of her most prestigious works is Single Form, which was made in memory of her friend and collector of her works, the former Secretary General Dag Hammarskjöld, and which stands in the plaza of the United Nations building in New York City. It was commissioned by Jacob Blaustein, a former United States delegate to the U.N., in 1961 following Hammarskjöld's death in a plane crash.

On 20 December 2011, her 1969 sculpture Two Forms (Divided Circle) was stolen from its plinth in Dulwich Park, South London. Suspicions are that the theft was by scrap metal thieves. The piece, which had been in the park since 1970, was insured for £500,000, a spokesman for Southwark Council said.

One of the editions of six of her 1964 bronze sculpture, Rock Form (Porthcurno), was removed from the Mander Centre in Wolverhampton in the spring of 2014 by its owners, the Royal Bank of Scotland and Delancey Estates. Its sudden disappearance led to questions in Parliament in September 2014. Paul Uppal, Member of Parliament for Wolverhampton South West said: "When the Rock Form was donated by the Mander family, it was done so in the belief it would be enjoyed and cherished by the people of Wolverhampton for generations... It belongs to, and should be enjoyed by, the City of Wolverhampton." The sculpture has since been loaned to the city by RBS and can be seen in Wolverhampton City Art Gallery.

== Recognition ==
Figure for Landscape, 1960, Hirshhorn Museum, Washington, D.C.

Hepworth was awarded the Grand Prix at the 1959 São Paulo Art Biennial. She was awarded the Freedom of St Ives in 1968 as an acknowledgment of her significant contributions to the town; she was a member of the St Ives Trust (which sought to protect the town's character and architectural heritage), a founder member of the 'Art in Schools' programme run by Cornwall County Council, and had gifted several sculptures to the town. The same year, she was inducted into Gorsedh Kernow with the bardic name Gravyor (meaning "Sculptor") – this was described as an "extraordinary honour" given that she was not a Cornish native. She was awarded honorary degrees from the universities of Birmingham (1960), Leeds (1961), Exeter (1966), Oxford (1968), London (1970) and Manchester (1971).

She was appointed CBE in 1958 and DBE in 1965. In 1973 she was elected an honorary member of the American Academy of Arts and Letters. Following her death, her studio and home in St Ives became the Barbara Hepworth Museum, which came under control of the Tate in 1980.

In 2011 The Hepworth Wakefield opened in Hepworth's hometown of Wakefield, England. The Museum was designed by the architect David Chipperfield.

In January 2015 Tate Britain staged a major retrospective with over 70 of Hepworth's works. The first large London show since 1968, it included her well-known major abstract carvings and bronzes, as well as previously unseen photographs and a 1930s self-photogram.

On 25 August 2020, Google honoured Hepworth with a Google Doodle. A Historic England blue plaque was unveiled in honour of Hepworth and first husband John Skeaping at 24 St Ann's Terrace, St John's Wood, London on 30 October 2020. The couple lived there in 1927.

Hepworth's work was included in the 2021 exhibition Women in Abstraction at the Centre Pompidou.

The first major survey of Hepworth's work, Barbara Hepworth: In Equilibrium, was held at Heide Museum of Modern Art in Melbourne from 5 November 2022 to 13 March 2023. Her work had a wide influence on Australian sculpture.

Hepworth's name is one of those featured on the sculpture Ribbons, unveiled in 2024.

Between 12 June and 6 September 2026, the Courtauld Gallery exhibited Hepworth in Colour, an exhibition focused on "the artist’s lifelong fascination with colour, which she used in highly original and unexpected ways." In conjunction with the exhibition, the gallery also exhibited Hepworth and Nicholson: The Hampstead Studio Photographs, displaying Paul Laib's 1933 photographs of their London studio (6 June to 4 October 2026).

From 21 November 2026 – 2 May 2027, Pallant House Gallery exhibited Barbara Hepworth and Greece which "reveals how a journey through Greece and its islands in 1954 renewed her artistic vision at a crucial point in her life." The exhibit shows Hepworth’s work in a variety of mediums along with diary entries from her trip.

== Gallery ==
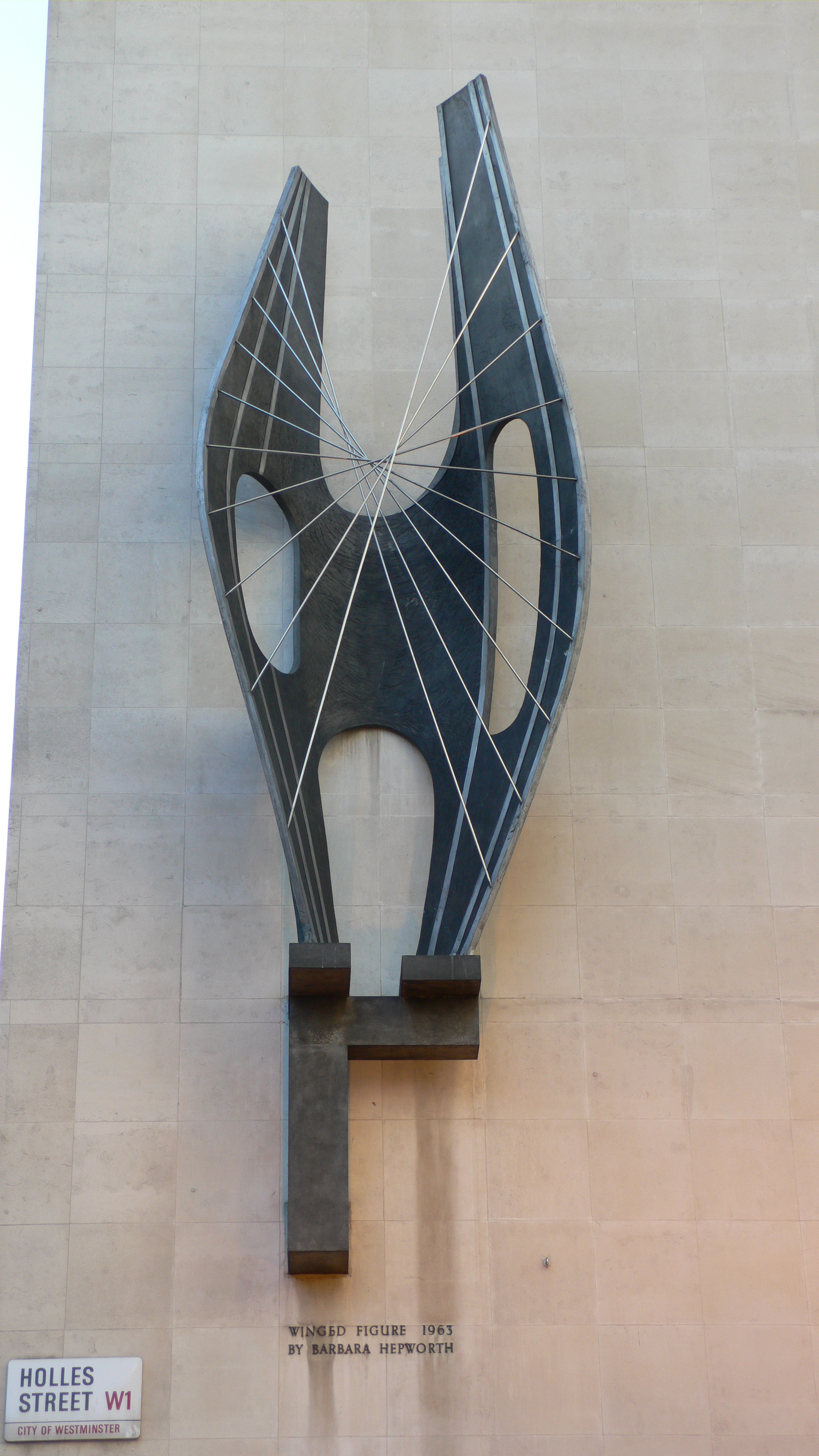
Winged Figure, 1963, on the side of the John Lewis department store, Holles Street and Oxford Street, London.

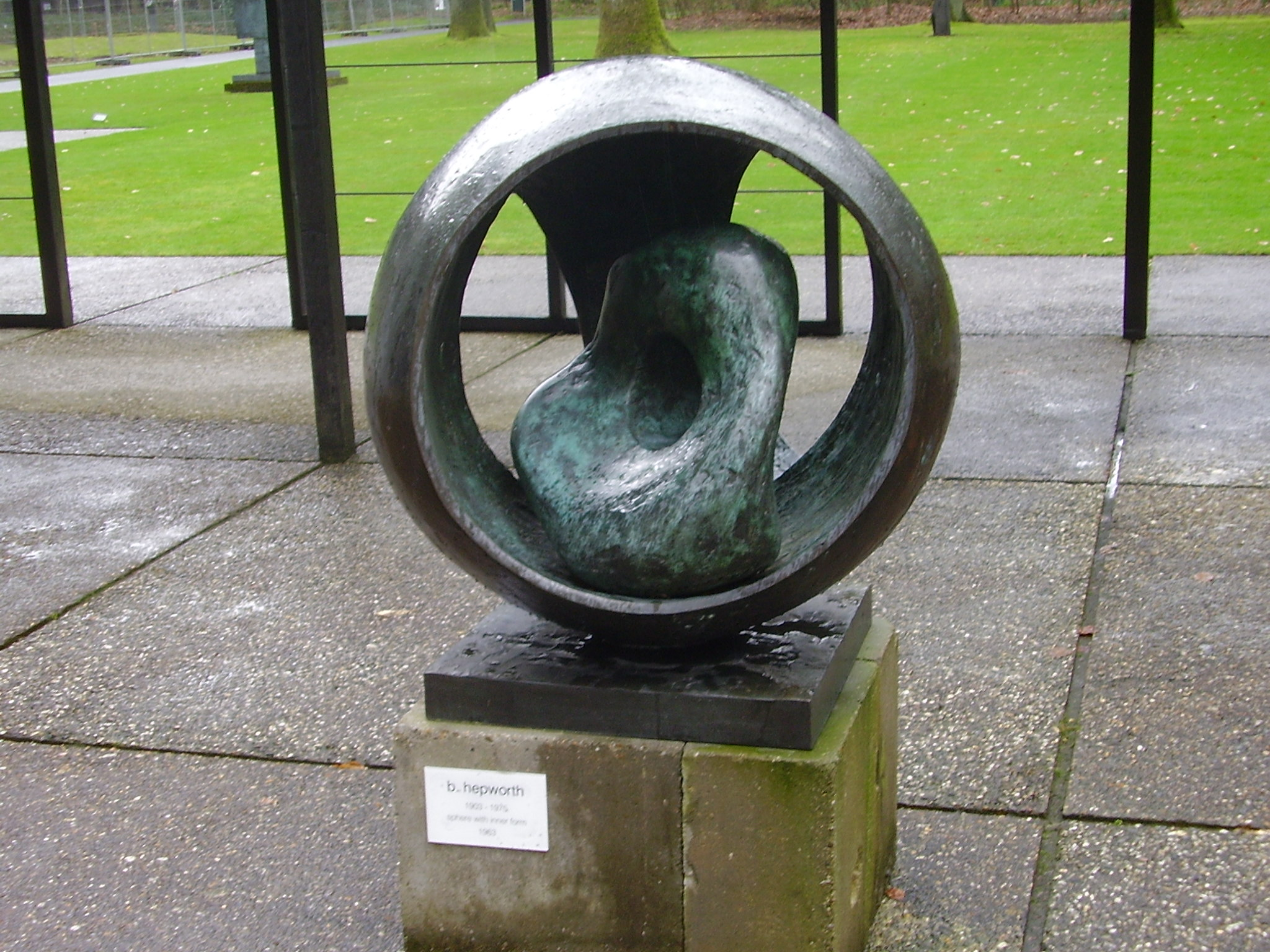
Sphere with Inner Form, 1963, at the Kröller-Müller Museum, Otterlo, the Netherlands.

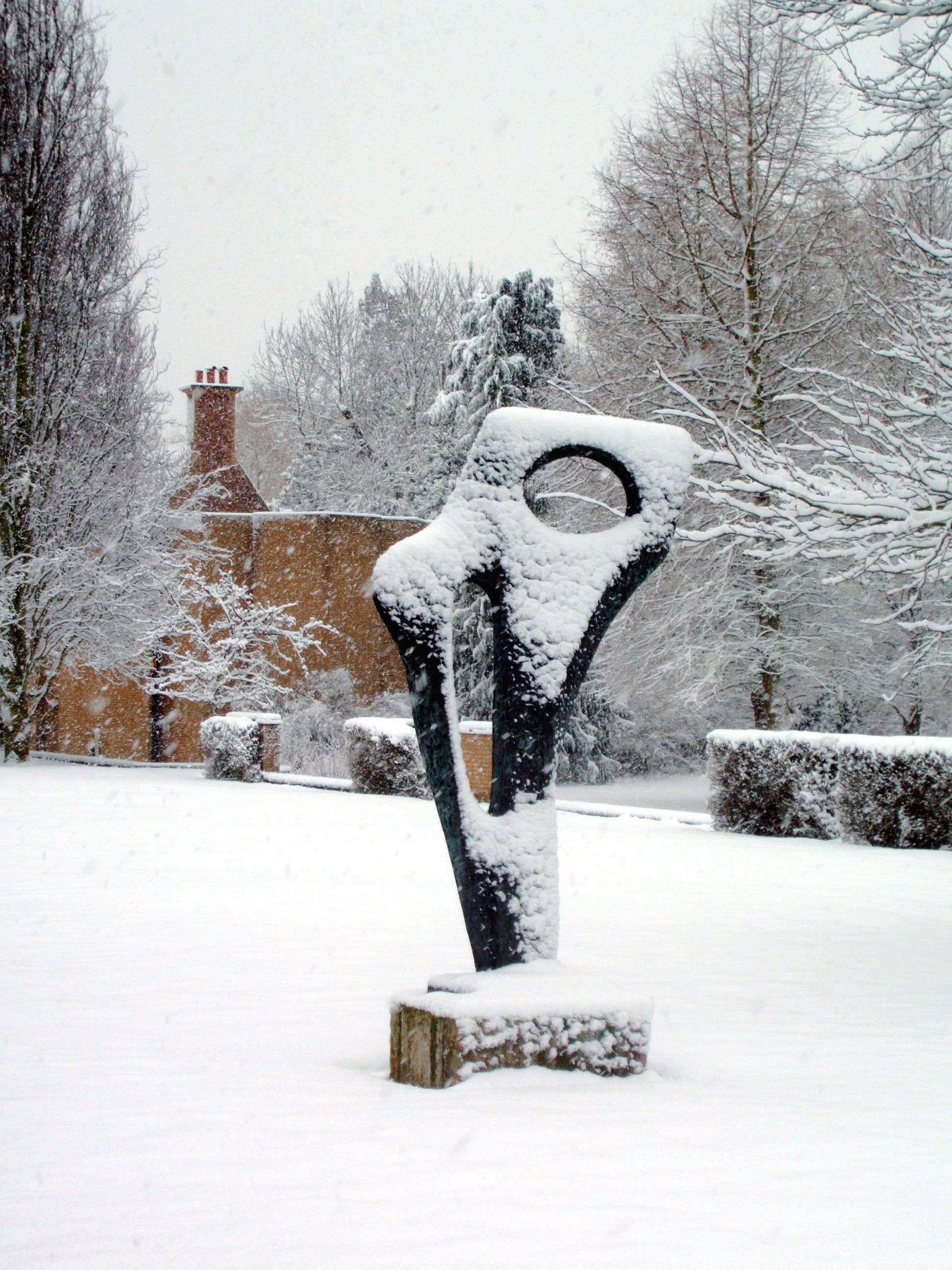
Achaean, c. 1963, at St Catherine's College, Oxford.

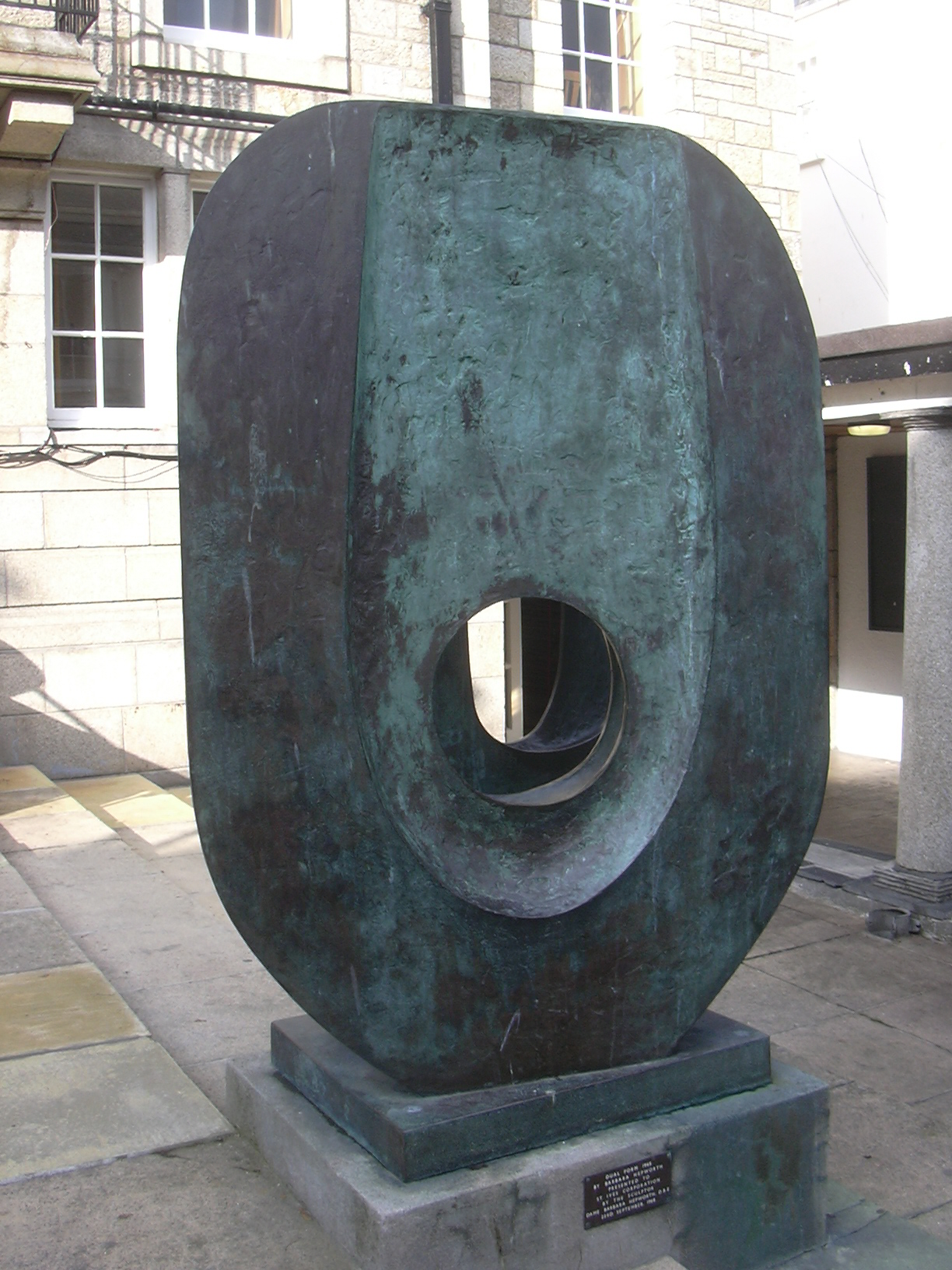
Dual Form at St Ives Guildhall.

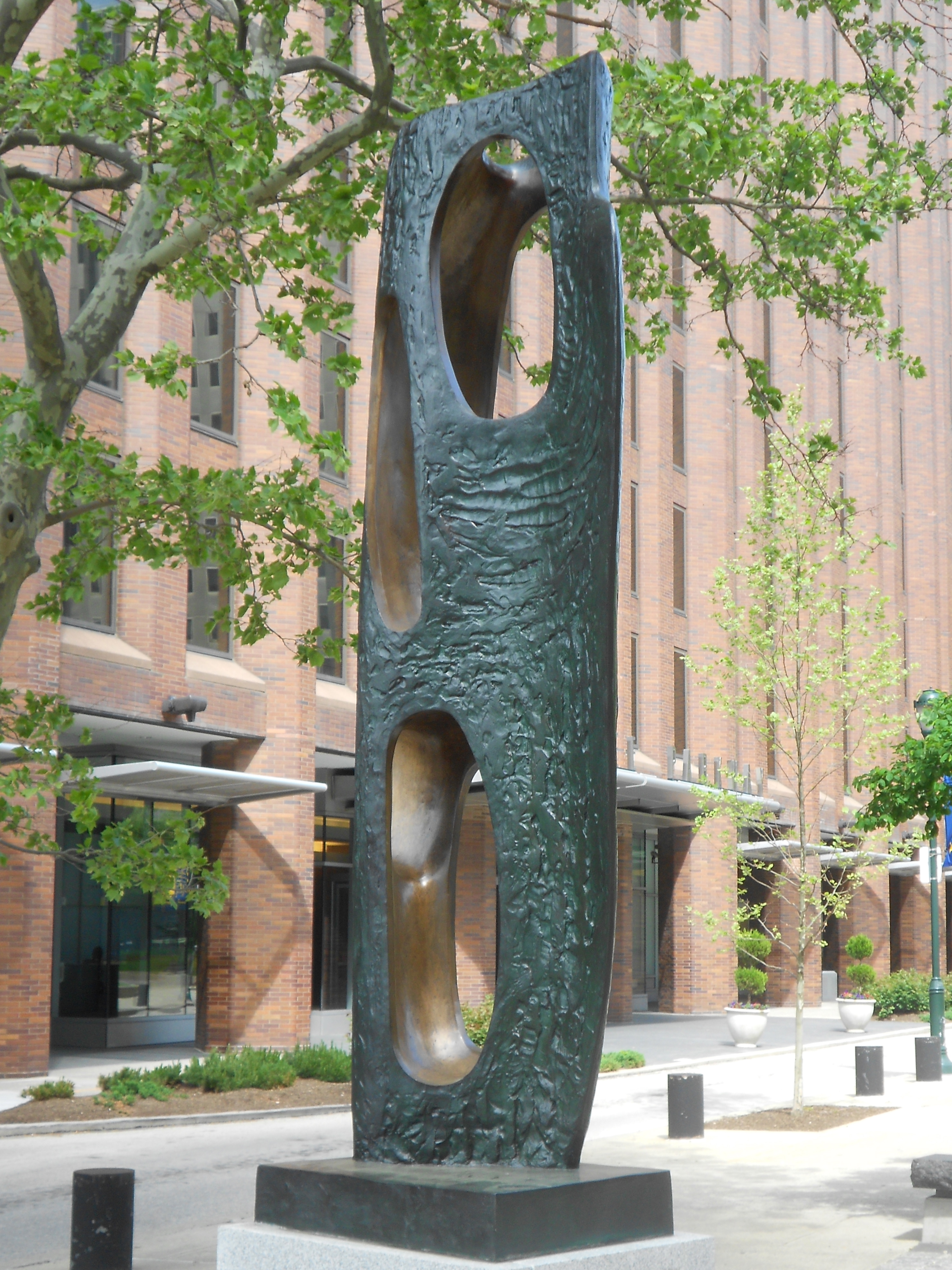
Rock Form (Porthcurno), 1964, Franklin Parkway, Philadelphia, Pennsylvania.

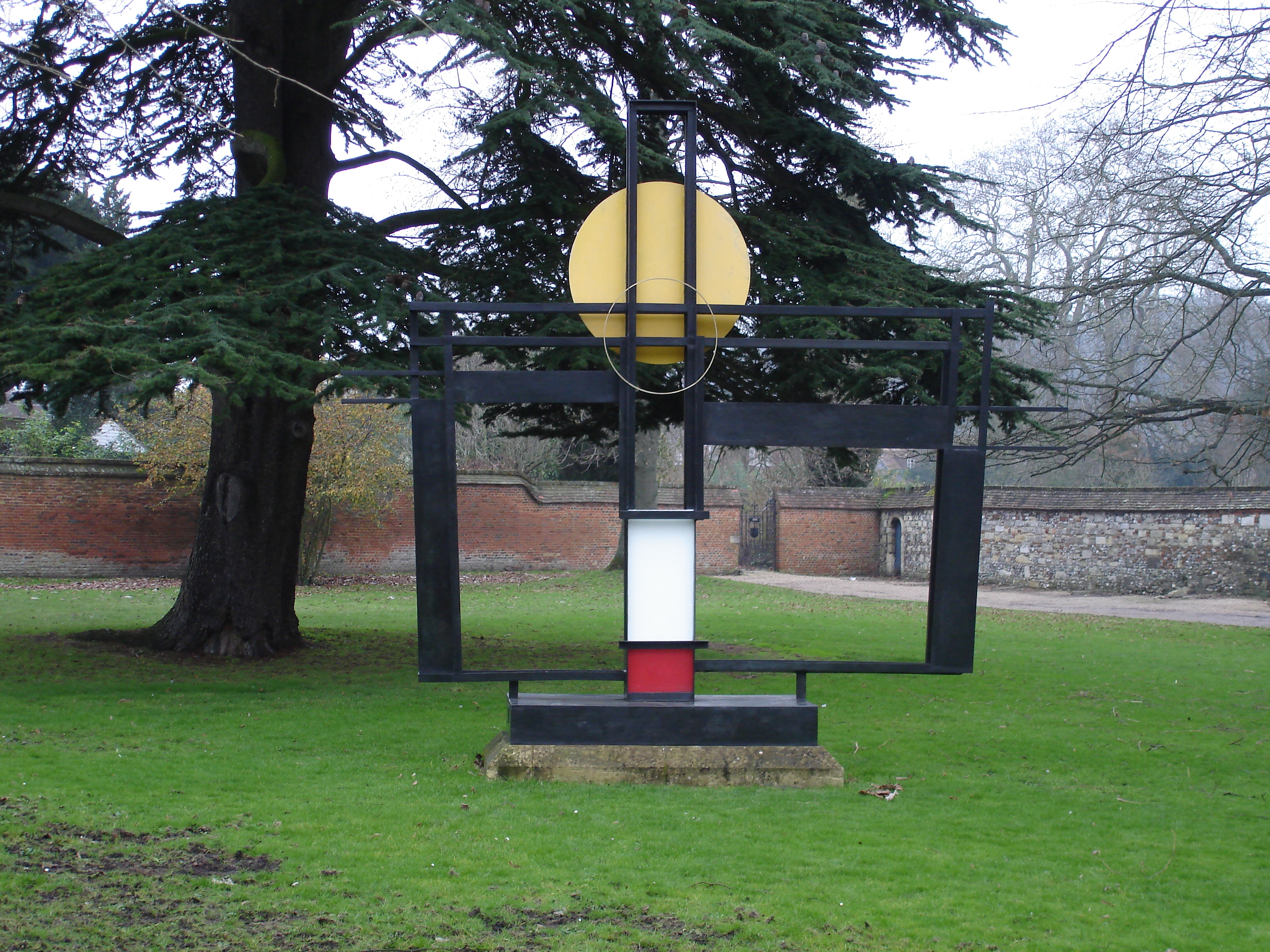
Construction (Crucifixion): Homage to Mondrian, 1966, outside Winchester Cathedral.

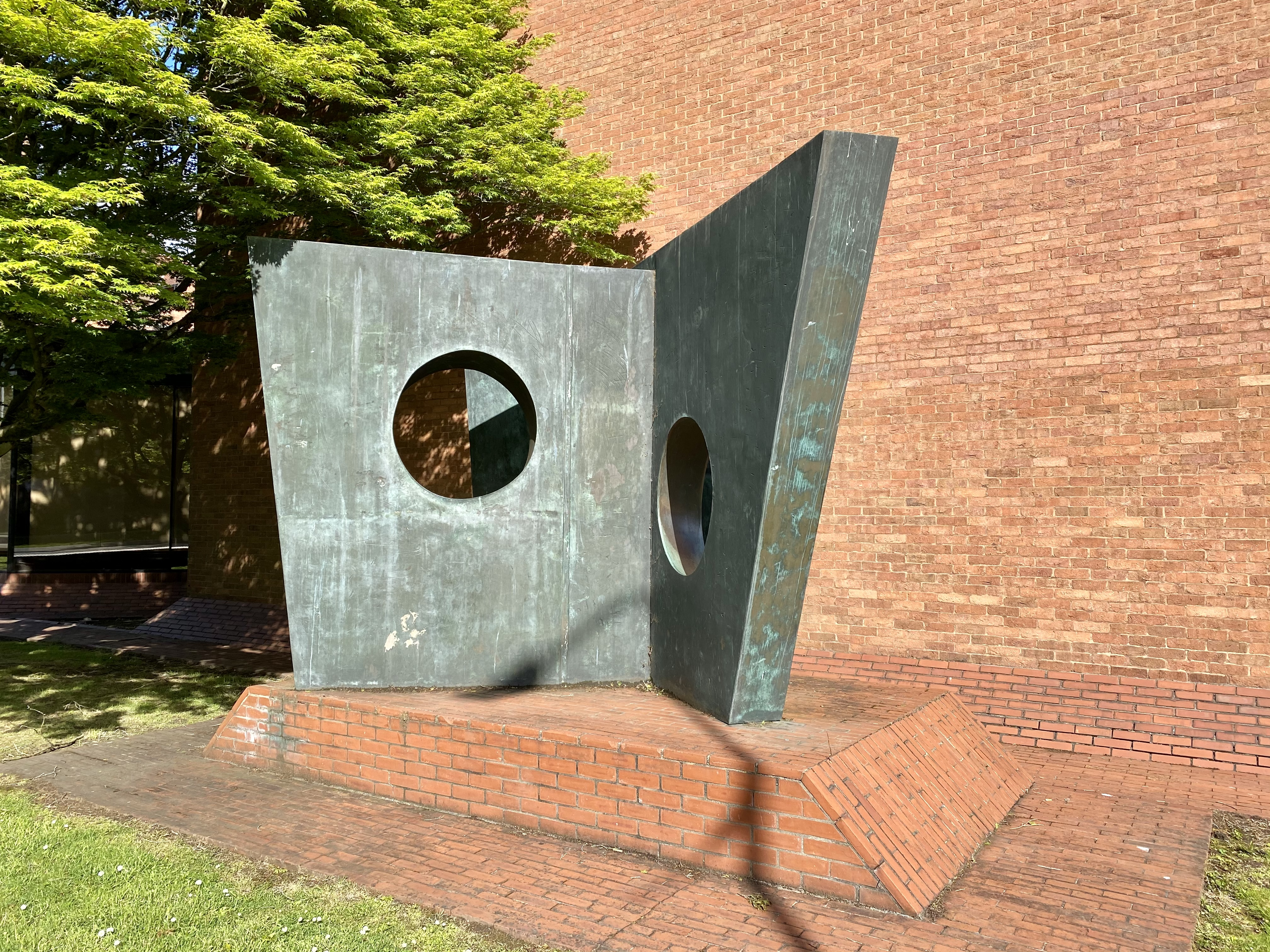
Three Obliques (Walk In), 1968, at Cardiff University School of Music

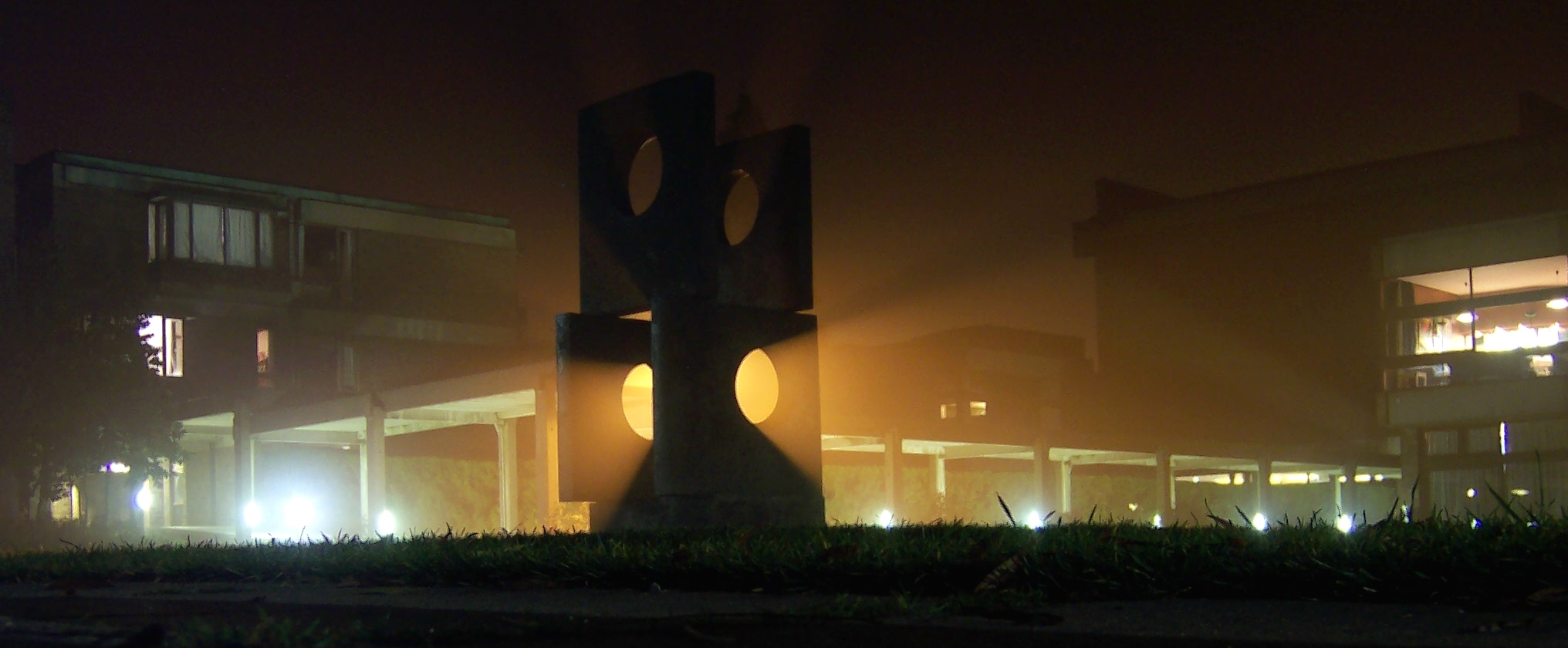
Four-Square (Walk Through), 1966, Churchill College, Cambridge.

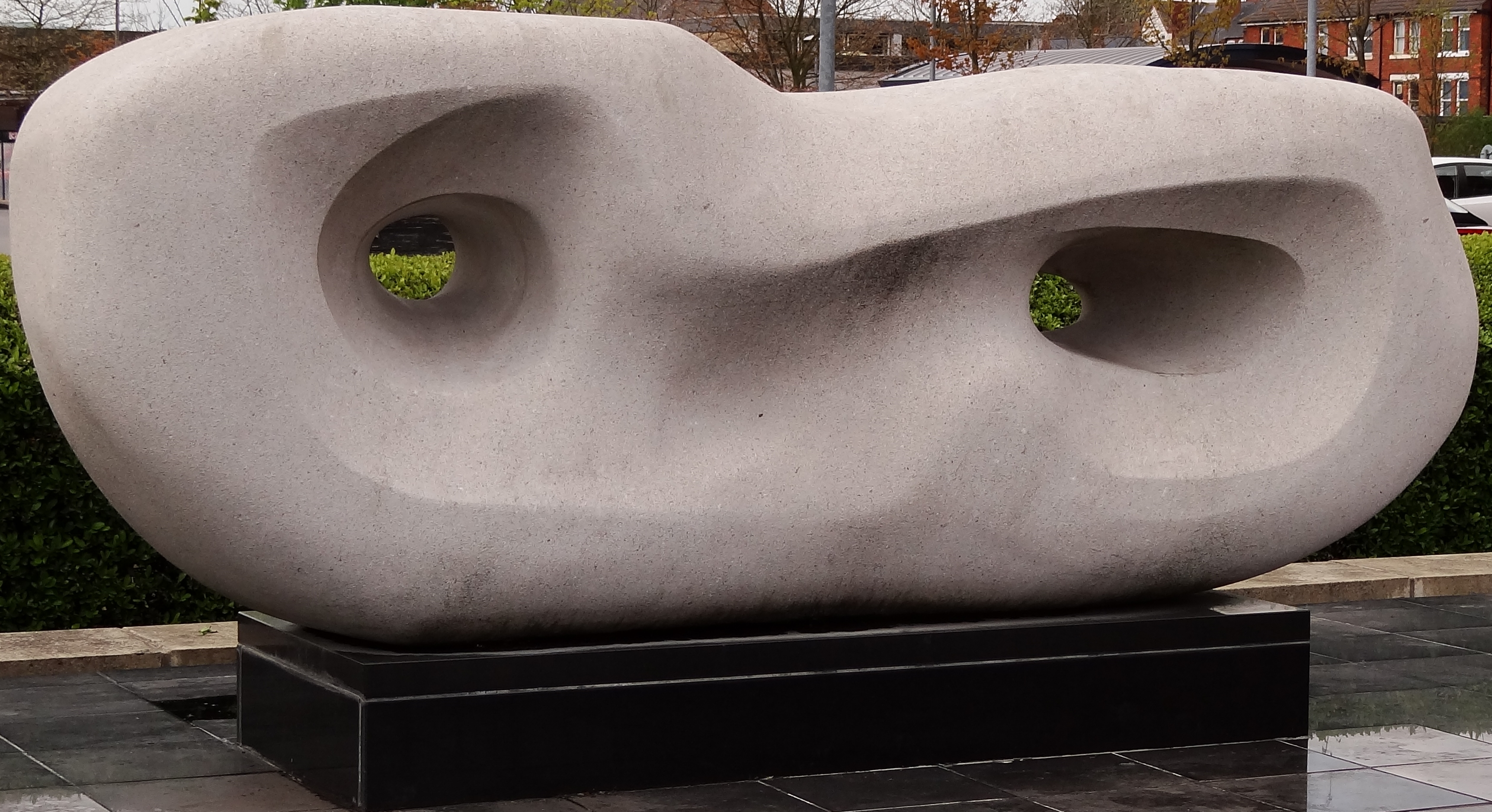
Curved Reclining Form (Rosewall), 1960–62, Chesterfield, Derbyshire

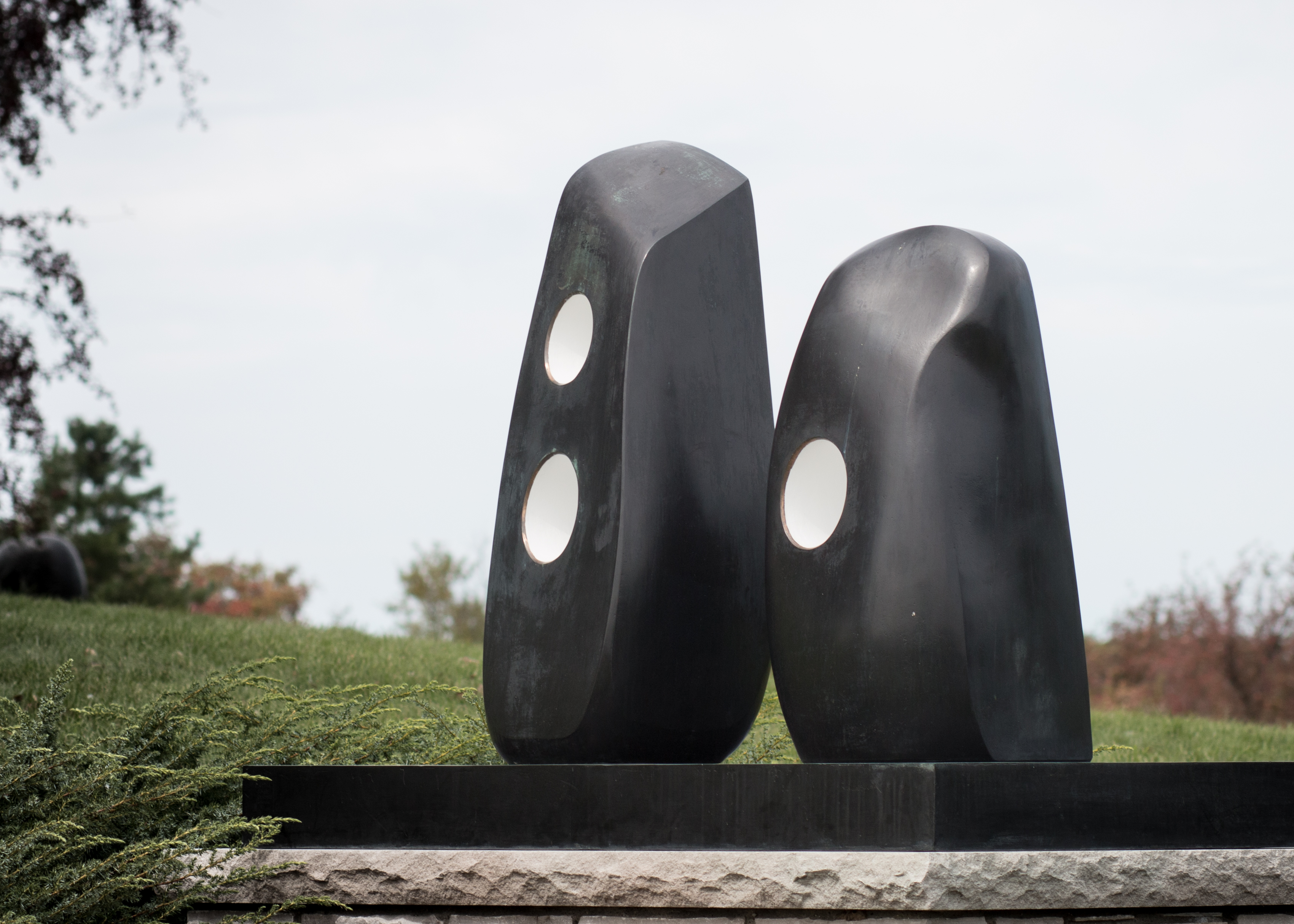
Summer Dance, 1972, at the Harrison Sculpture Garden, Minnesota Landscape Arboretum

== List of selected works ==
Year(s)	Title	Material	Notes	Code	Location
1927	Doves	Parian marble		BH 3	Manchester Art Gallery
1932–33	Seated Figure	lignum vitae		BH 46	Tate
1933	Two Forms	alabaster and limestone		BH 51	
1934	Mother and Child	Cumberland alabaster		BH 6	The Hepworth Wakefield
1935	Three Forms	Seravezza marble			
1936	Ball Plane and Hole	lignum vitae, mahogany and oak			
1937	Pierced Hemisphere 1	white marble			
1940	Sculpture with Colour (Deep Blue and Red)	mixed			
1943	Sculpture with Colour (Oval Form) Pale Blue and Red	wood and string			
1943	Oval Sculpture	cast material			
1943–44	Wave	wood, paint and string			
1944	Landscape Sculpture	wood (cast in bronze, 1961)			
1946	Pelagos	wood, paint and string			
1946	Tides	wood and paint			
1947	Blue and green (arthroplasty) 31 December 1947	oil and pencil on pressed paperboard			
1948	Surgeon Waiting	oil and pencil on pressed paperboard			
1949	Operation: Case for Discussion	oil and pencil on pressed paperboard			
1951	Group I (Concourse) 4 February 1951	Serravezza marble			
1953	Hieroglyph	Ancaster stone			
1953	Monolith-Empyrean	Ancaster stone			
1954–55	Two Figures	teak and paint			
1955	Oval Sculpture (Delos)	scented guarea wood and paint			
1955–56	Coré	bronze			
1956	Curved Form (Trevalgan)	bronze (see external link to collection of Margaret Gardiner)			
1956	Orpheus (Maquette), Version II	brass and cotton string			
1956	Stringed Figure (Curlew), Version II	brass and cotton string			
1958	Cantate Domino	bronze			
1958	Sea Form (Porthmeor)	bronze			
1959	Curved form with inner form – anima	bronze			
1960	Figure for Landscape	bronze			
1960	Archaeon	bronze			
1960	Meridian	bronze			
1960–62	Curved Reclining Form (Rosewall)	Nabresina limestone			
1961	Curved Form (Bryher)	bronze			
1962–63	Bronze Form (Patmos)	bronze			
1963	Winged Figure	bronze			
1963–65	Sphere with Inner Form	bronze			
1964	Rock Form (Porthcurno)	bronze			
1964	Sea Form (Atlantic)	bronze			
1964	Oval Form (Trezion)	bronze			
1964	Single Form	bronze			
1966	Figure in a Landscape	bronze on wooden base			
1966	Four-Square (Walk Through)	bronze			
1967	Two Forms (Orkney)	slate			
1968	Two Figures	bronze and gold			
1969	Two Forms (Divided Circle)	bronze			
1970	The Family of Man	bronze			
1971	The Aegean Suite	series of prints			
1971	Summer Dance	painted bronze			
1972	Minoan Head	marble on wooden base			
1972	Assembly of Sea Forms	white marble mounted on stainless steel base			
1973	Conversation with Magic Stones	bronze and silver		BH 567	

Marble portrait heads dating from London, ca. 1927, of Barbara Hepworth by John Skeaping, and of Skeaping by Hepworth, are documented by photograph in the Skeaping Retrospective catalogue, but are both believed to be lost.

== Galleries and locations exhibiting her work ==
Two museums are named after Hepworth and have significant collections of her work: the Barbara Hepworth Museum in St Ives, Cornwall, and The Hepworth Wakefield in West Yorkshire. Her work also may be seen at:

=== United Kingdom ===
==== Academia ====
- The University of Birmingham,
- Churchill College, Cambridge
- Clare College, Cambridge,
- Murray Edwards College, Cambridge
- Three Obliques (Walk In) at Cardiff University School of Music,
- The University of Exeter, Streatham Campus
- Keele University
- The University of Liverpool
- St Catherine's College, Oxford,
- The University of Southampton, Highfield Campus
- The University of Greater Manchester, Formally University of Bolton

==== Museums and galleries ====
- Birmingham Museum and Art Gallery, Birmingham
- Kettle's Yard, Cambridge
- Leeds Art Gallery
- The Pier Arts Centre, Stromness, Orkney
- Tate Gallery, London
- Whitechapel Gallery, London, England (8 April – 6 June 1954)
- Yorkshire Sculpture Park in West Bretton, West Yorkshire

==== Other ====
- The facade of Cheltenham House, Cheltenham
- Chesterfield, Derbyshire, behind Royal Mail (1 Future Walk, West Bars)
- Glebelands, Harlow, Essex (namely Contrapuntal Forms)
- Kenwood House, London
- The facade, John Lewis department store, Oxford Street, London
- Outside the Norwich Playhouse
- Snape Maltings, Snape, Suffolk
- The Mander Centre, Wolverhampton (removed 2014)
- In the grounds of Winchester Cathedral next to The Pilgrims' School

=== United States ===
- Art Institute of Chicago, Chicago, Illinois
- Dallas Museum of Art, Dallas, Texas
- Mary and Leigh Block Museum of Art, Northwestern University, Illinois
- Kimbell Art Museum, Fort Worth, Texas
- Franklin D. Murphy Sculpture Garden, Los Angeles, California
- Lynden Sculpture Garden, Milwaukee, Wisconsin
- Harrison Sculpture Garden, Minnesota Landscape Arboretum
- Hirshhorn Museum and Sculpture Garden, Washington, DC

=== Other countries ===
- Art Gallery of South Australia, Adelaide, Australia
- Kröller-Müller Museum, Otterlo, Netherlands
- Museum of New Zealand Te Papa Tongarewa in Wellington, NZ
