= Morris Singer =

British art foundry

Morris Singer is a British art foundry, recognised as the oldest fine art foundry in the world. Its predecessor, Singer was established in 1848 in Frome, Somerset, by John Webb Singer, as the Frome Art Metal Works.

The Singer Art Foundry was famous for its metal bronzes, including the monumental "Boadicea and her Daughters" at Westminster Bridge, "Justice" on the top of the Central Criminal Court, the Old Bailey and John Knox in Edinburgh.

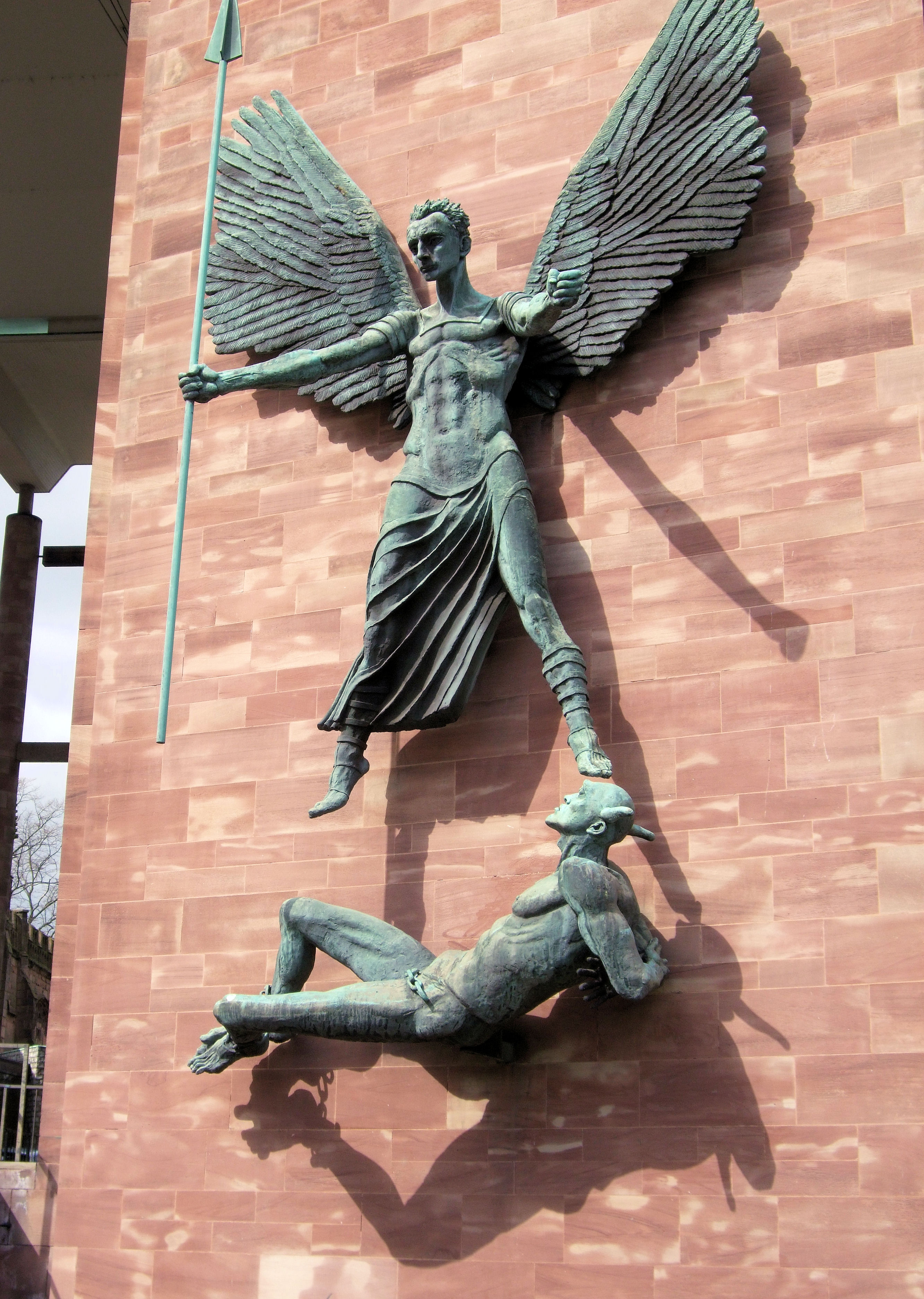
Epstein's St Michael's Victory over the Devil, Coventry Cathedral; cast by Morris Singer, 1960

During the first half of the 20th century, following the amalgamation of the Morris Art Bronze company (set up in 1921) with J W Singer & Sons in 1927, the foundry was situated in Lambeth, London. Many famous sculptures were cast there, including that of Reynolds by Alfred Drury in the Royal Academy courtyard in London (1930), Jacob Epstein's "St Michael's Victory over the Devil" for Coventry Cathedral and the Single Form sculpture outside the UN in 1964 by Barbara Hepworth. Singer had produced earlier works for Alfred Drury including the plaque "Opening of the Blackwall Tunnel" (1897) and the statue "Joseph Priestley" (1903).

Thornycroft's last work was the 1925 recumbent statue of the Bishop of Coventry which was almost the only major artefact that survived the bombing of Coventry Cathedral in 1940. Morris Singer skilfully repaired the damaged casting in the 1950s.

In 1967, the company moved premises to a more spacious site in Basingstoke. Oscar Nemon's seated statue of Sigmund Freud in Hampstead was cast there and installed in 1971. In 1984, it was owned by listed company William Morris Fine Arts.

Since 2001, the company has been based in Lasham, Hampshire. To this day, the foundry has expertise in a range of services, including bronze casting, lost wax casting, moulding, patination and many more. Nic Fiddian-Green's Still Water was installed near Marble Arch in 2011. A more recent casting was for the Tedworth House Recovery Centre, opened on 20 May 2013 by Princes William and Henry - the Help for Heroes statue.
