= List of sculpture parks =

This is a list of sculpture parks by country.

== Africa ==
=== Morocco ===
- Anima Garden, 27 km (17 mi) from Marrakech just off the Ourika road

=== South Africa ===
- Sculpture Garden of the Kirstenbosch National Botanical Garden, Cape Town

=== Zimbabwe ===
- Chapungu Sculpture Park, Harare

== Asia ==
=== China ===
- Changchun World Sculpture Park, Changchun City, Jilin Province
- Guangzhou Sculpture Park, Guangzhou, "China's largest thematic sculpture park"
- Guilin Yuzi Paradise (愚自乐园). "This large scale park hosts land art and contemporary sculpture featuring over 200 works by 140 artists from 47 different nations. On the grounds of Yuzi Paradise (or 'Fool's Paradise') is also the Hotel of Modern Art."
- Wuhu Sculpture Park, Wuhu City, Anhui Province, China
- Zobon City Sculpture Garden, Shanghai

More sculpture parks in China—listed on Birkbeck, University of London page You can add them in this section.

=== India ===
- Malampuzha Dam garden, Kerala
- Nek Chand's Rock Garden, Chandigarh
- Ramoji Film City, near Hyderabad, India
- The Sculpture Park at Madhavendra Palace, Nahargarh Fort, Jaipur
- Art Ichol Sculpture Park in Maihar, Madhya Pradesh

=== Japan ===
- Benesse House Museum, Naoshima Island
- Hakone Open-Air Museum, Hakone, Kanagawa Prefecture

=== Laos ===
- Bunleua Sulilat's Buddha Park

=== Philippines ===
- APEC Sculpture Garden, CCP Complex, Pasay

=== Singapore ===
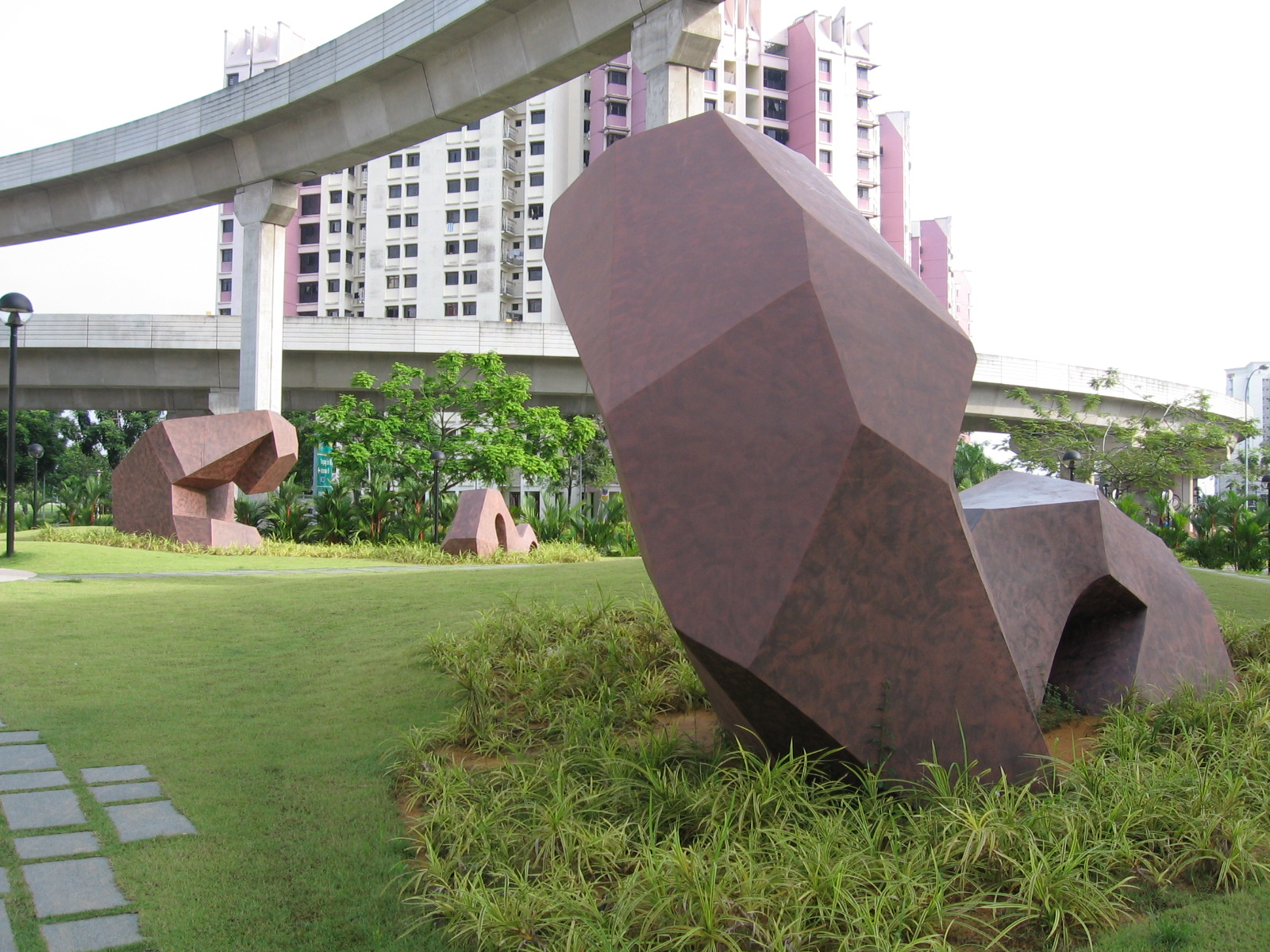
"Waves", Sengkang Sculpture Park, Singapore

- Sengkang Sculpture Park

=== South Korea ===
- Baemikkumi Sculpture Park

=== Taiwan ===
- Fengle Sculpture Park, Taichung
- Stone Sculpture Park, New Taipei

=== Thailand ===
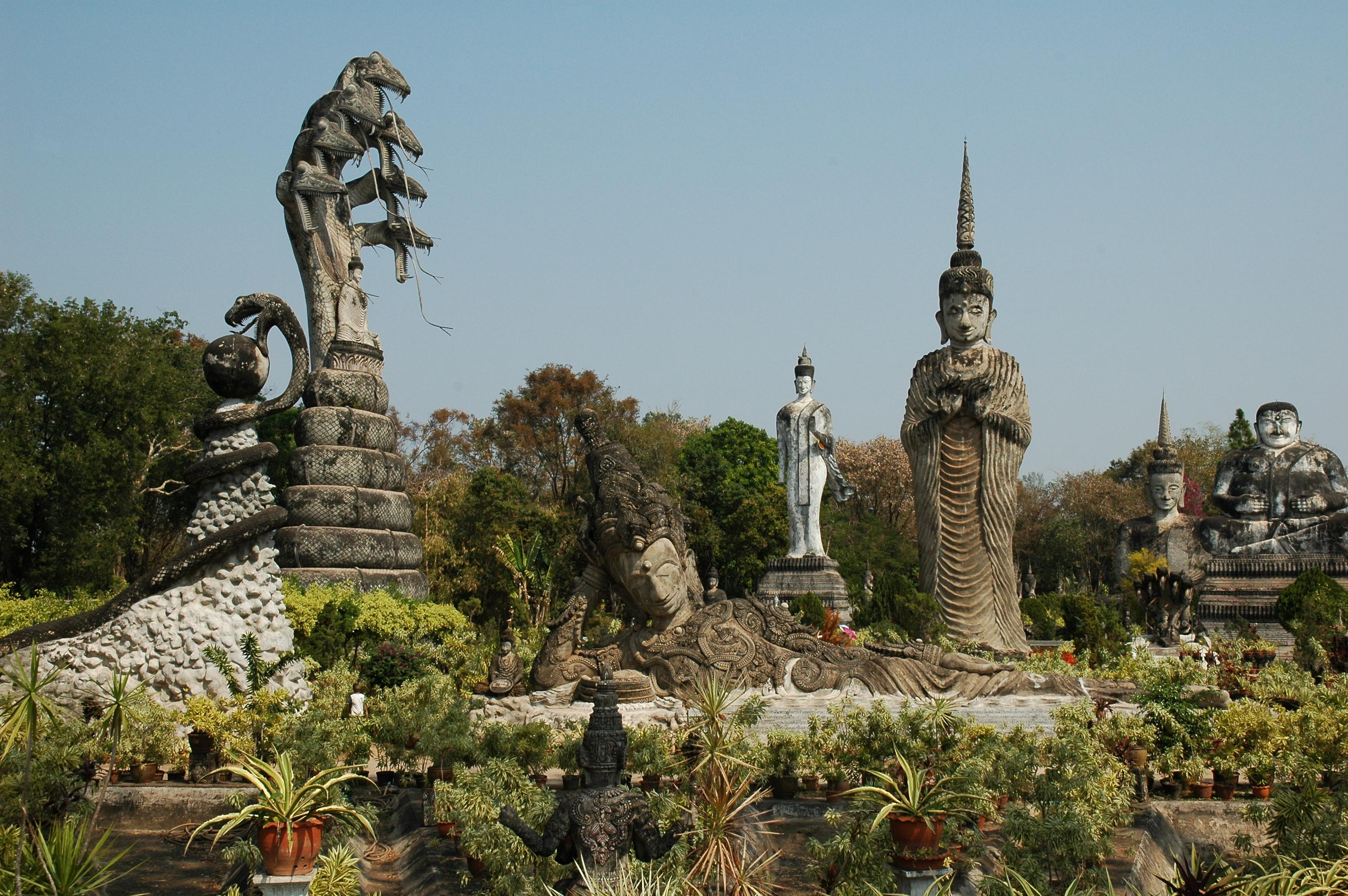
Bunleua Sulilat's Sala Keoku, Nong Khai, Thailand

- Bunleua Sulilat's Sala Keoku, Nong Khai

=== Vietnam ===
- Artika Sculpture Park
- Ta Phin, Sa Pa, Lao Cai, Viet Nam

== Europe ==
=== Austria ===
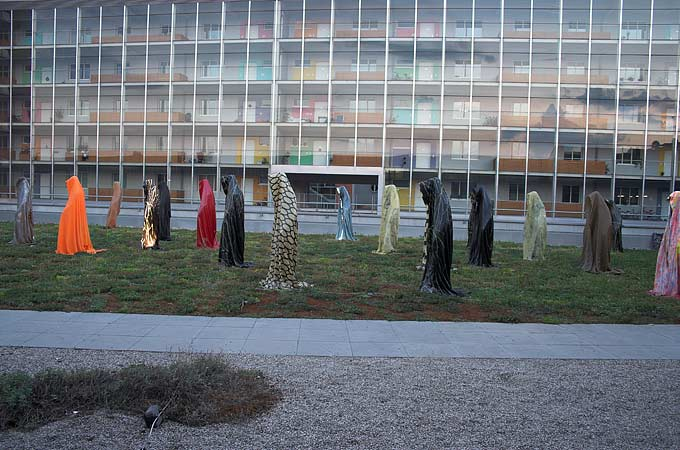
The urban Sculpture garden Artpark in Linz, Austria, 2008

- Österreichischer Skulpturenpark (Austrian Sculpture Park), sculpture park with outdoor sculptures of contemporary Austrian and international artists in Unterpremstätten, 7 km south of the Styrian capital Graz
- Skulpturenpark Artpark, urban sculpture garden in Linz, Upper Austria. Sculptures are permanently exhibited.

=== Belgium ===
- Brussels Park, Brussels
- Hugo Voeten Collection Sculpture Park (Beeldentuin Kunstverzameling Hugo Voeten) in Geel
- Middelheim Open Air Sculpture Museum (Beeldentuin Middelheim Museum) in Antwerp
- Parc Astrid, Charleroi

=== Cyprus ===
- Museum of Underwater Sculpture – at Ayia Napa – underwater museum off the coast of Cypress

=== Denmark ===
- Copenhagen Naturlagepladsen Himmelhoj
- Tørskind Gravel Pit, former gravel pit converted to a sculpture park near Egtved, Vejle

=== France ===
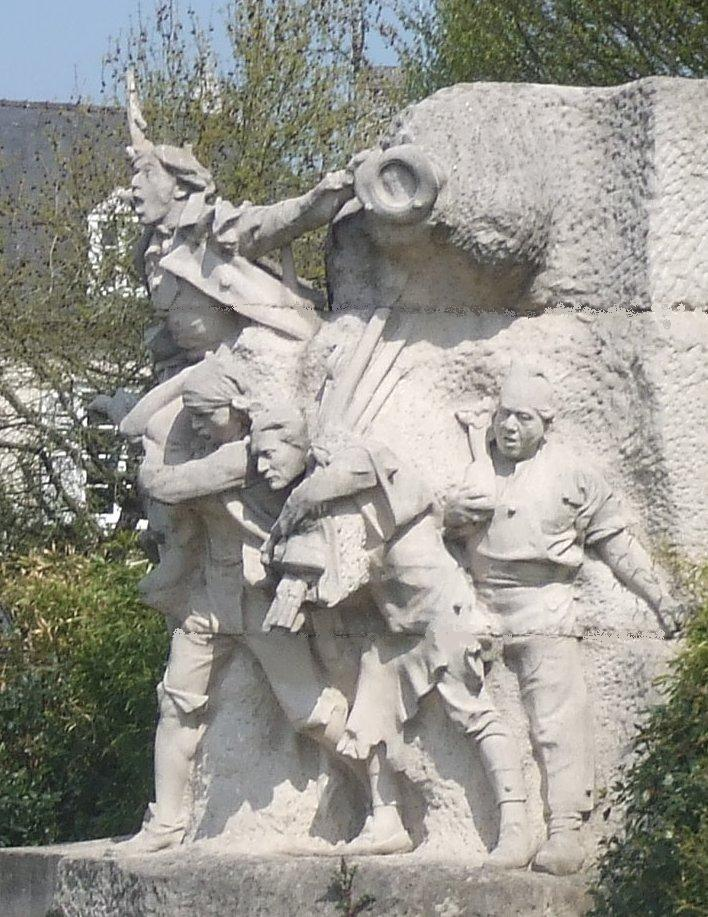
Storming of the Bastille, by Jean Boucher in Cesson-Sévigné

- Cesson-Sévigné and Hédé, towns near Rennes in Brittany, have sculpture gardens dedicated to the work of Jean Boucher.
- Chateau La Coste / Villa La Coste – a 500-acre sculpture park on a winery north of Aix-en-Provence, in Provence.
- Jardin du Luxembourg, Paris
- Kerguehennec near Vannes in Brittany with contemporary sculptures
- Musée Rodin in Paris has an extensive sculpture garden featuring many of Auguste Rodin's most famous works.
- Parc de sculptures Engelbrecht in the gardens and former farming fields of the Château des Fougis (Thionne in Allier, Auvergne). Giant steel sculptures of German artist Erich Engelbrecht.
- Tuileries Garden outside the Louvre, Paris, including works by Aristide Maillol

=== Germany ===
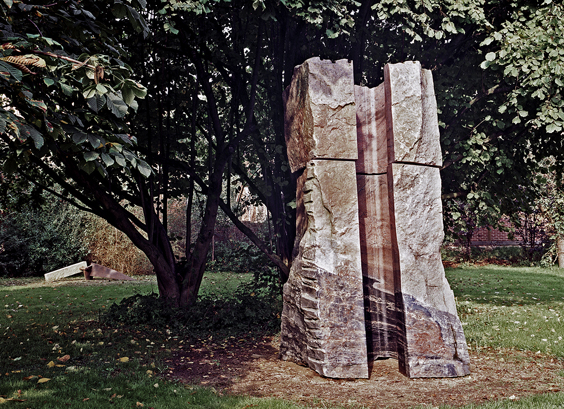
Klaus Müller-Klug, Quader mit Lichthof Granit, 2,50 m, Skulpturengarten Damnatz

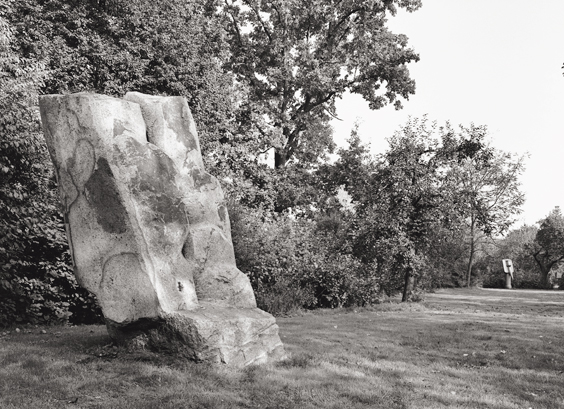
Das Paar, at the Skulpturengarten Damnatz

- Skulpturen Park Köln in Cologne; features contemporary sculptures (1997–2009)
- Skulpturengarten Damnatz, founded by Klaus and Monika Müller-Klug
- Skulpturengarten Passentin (Mecklenburg-Vorpommern), established by Dorothee Rätsch
- Skulpturenpark Waldfrieden, Wuppertal

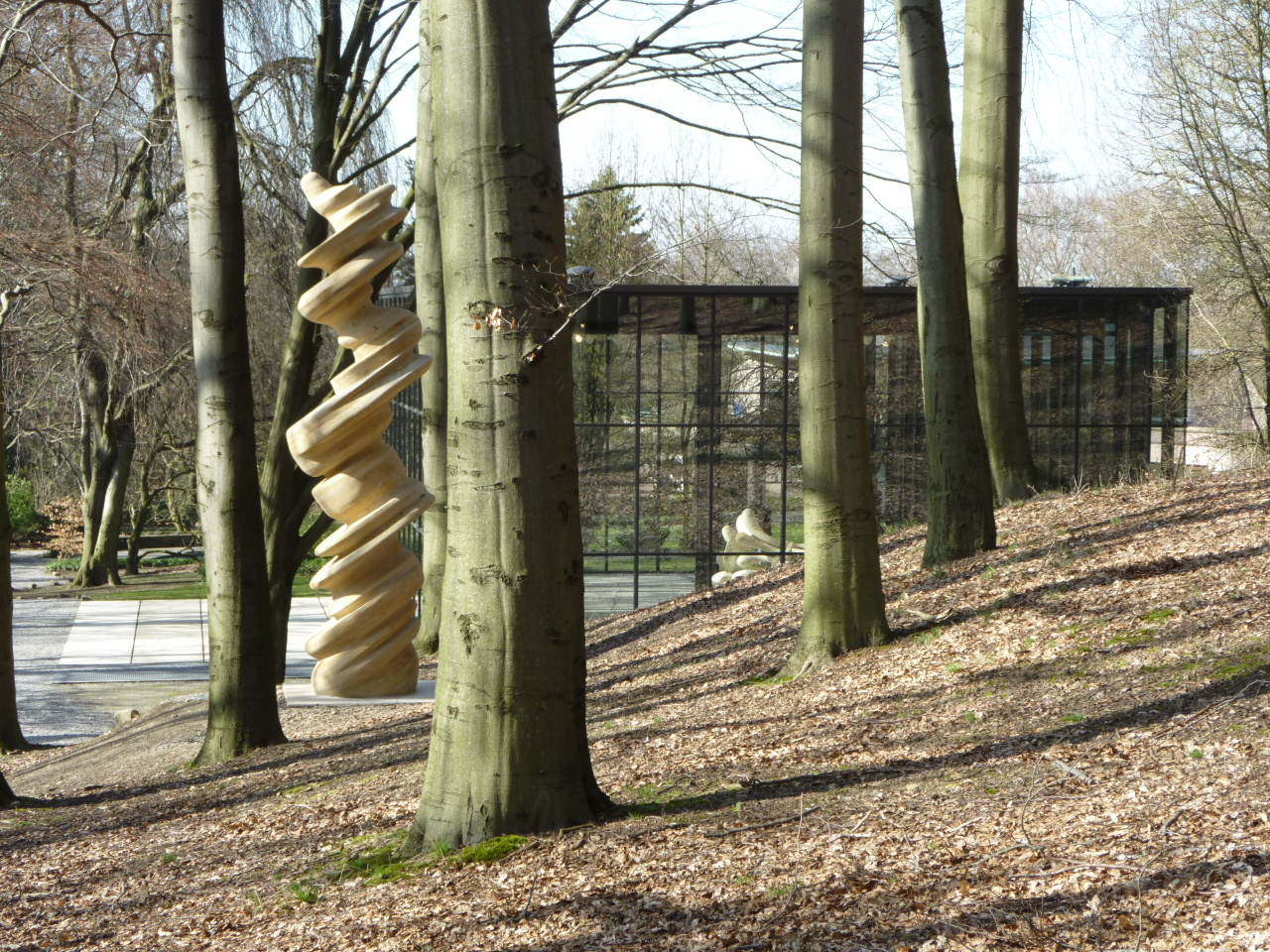
Tony Cragg: Dancing Column in Skulpturenpark Waldfrieden

=== Greece ===
- Park of Sculpture of the European Cultural Centre of Delphi

=== Hungary ===
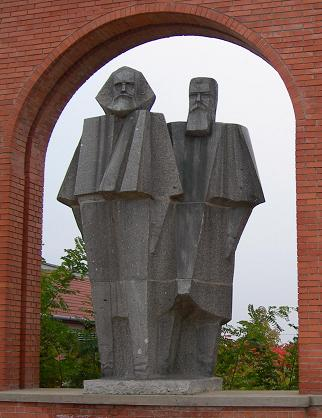
Statue of Marx and Engels from the Szoborpark, a themed sculpture park

- Memento Park (Szoborpark), statue park in the outskirts of Budapest, which houses the statues from Communist times which are "no longer required"

=== Ireland ===
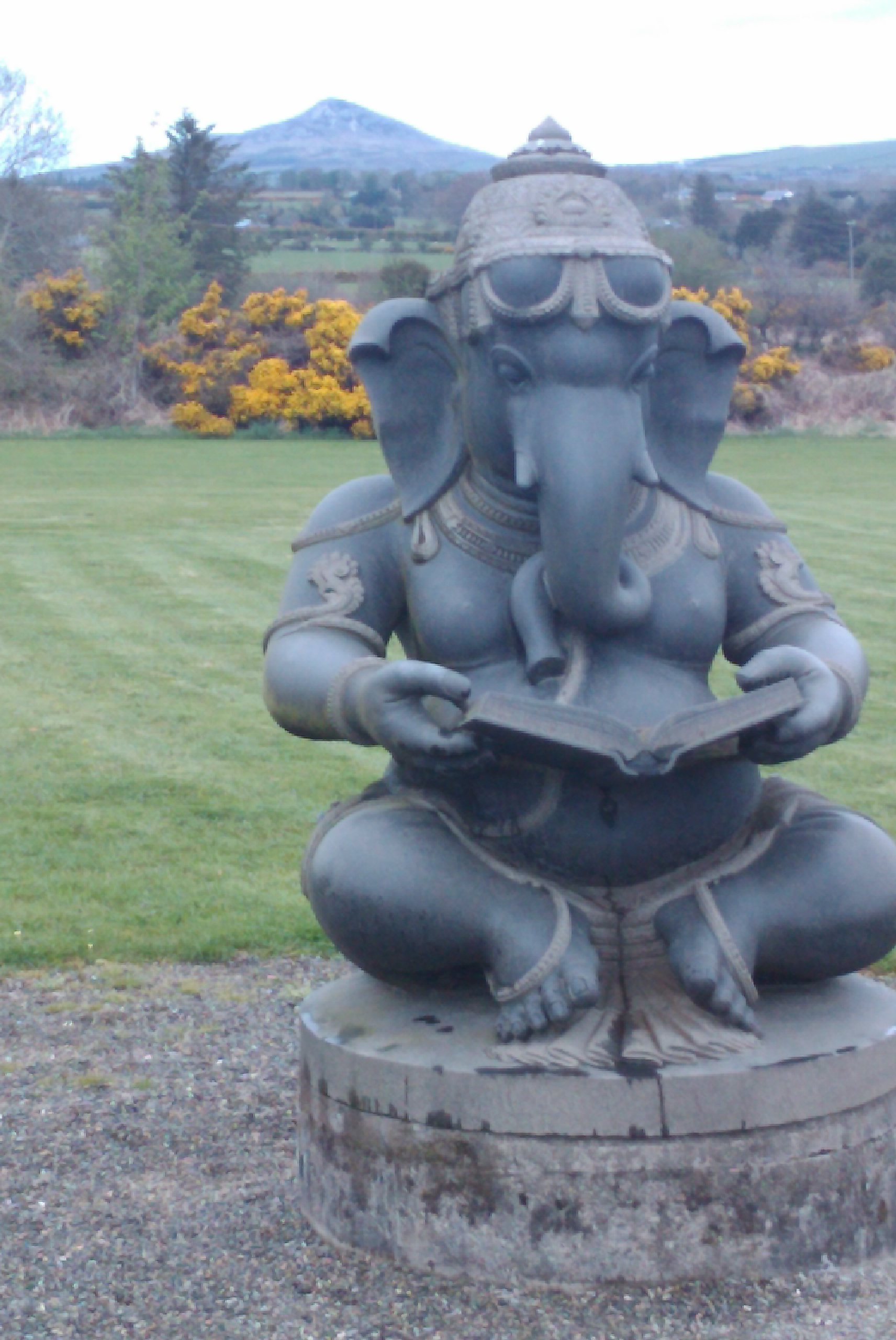
Statue of Ganesha at Victor's Way

- Sculpture in the Parklands, Lough Boora, County Offaly
- Victor's Way, Roundwood, County Wicklow (closed)

=== Italy ===
- Chianti Sculpture Park, Tuscany, about 7 miles (11 km) north of Siena. Over a wooded area of 32 acres (13 ha), the Parco sculture del Chianti is a collection of site-specific sculptures and installations created by artists from over 25 countries.
- Collezione Gori – Fattoria di Celle, Santomato di Pistoia
- Gardens of Bomarzo – Garden and sculpture complex in Italy
- La Scarzuola – Architectural complex in Umbria, Italy
- Parco della scultura di Castelbuono di Bevagna
- Parco Scultura La Palomba, Matera
- Tarot Garden – Niki de Saint Phalle sculpture park in Tuiscany

=== Lithuania ===
- Europos Parkas near Vilnius
- Grūtas Park (aka Stalin's World), a collection of monumental Soviet-era statues and other ideological relics, about 130 km southeast of Vilnius
- Hill of Witches, Juodkrantė, near the Baltic Sea
- Lithuanian Museum of Ancient Beekeeping in northeastern Lithuania

=== Netherlands ===
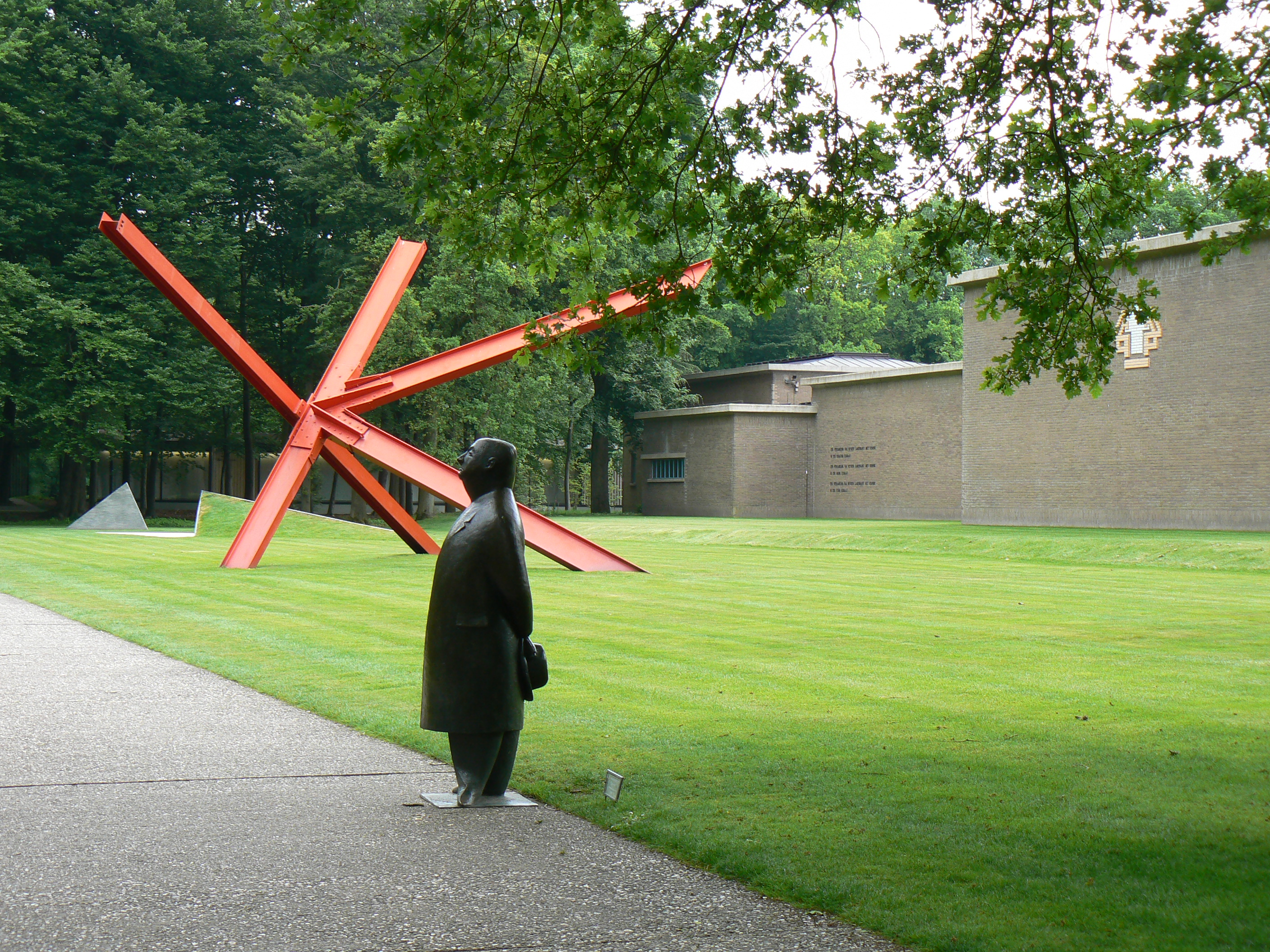
Entrance to the Kröller-Müller Museum

- Beeldenpark van het Kröller-Müller Museum, the sculpture park of the Kröller-Müller Museum situated in Hoge Veluwe National Park. It is one of the finest examples of a sculpture park in Europe, with in their collection art of Auguste Rodin, Henry Moore, Barbara Hepworth, Richard Serra, Jean Dubuffet, Mark di Suvero, Lucio Fontana, Fritz Wotruba and Claes Oldenburg.

=== Norway ===
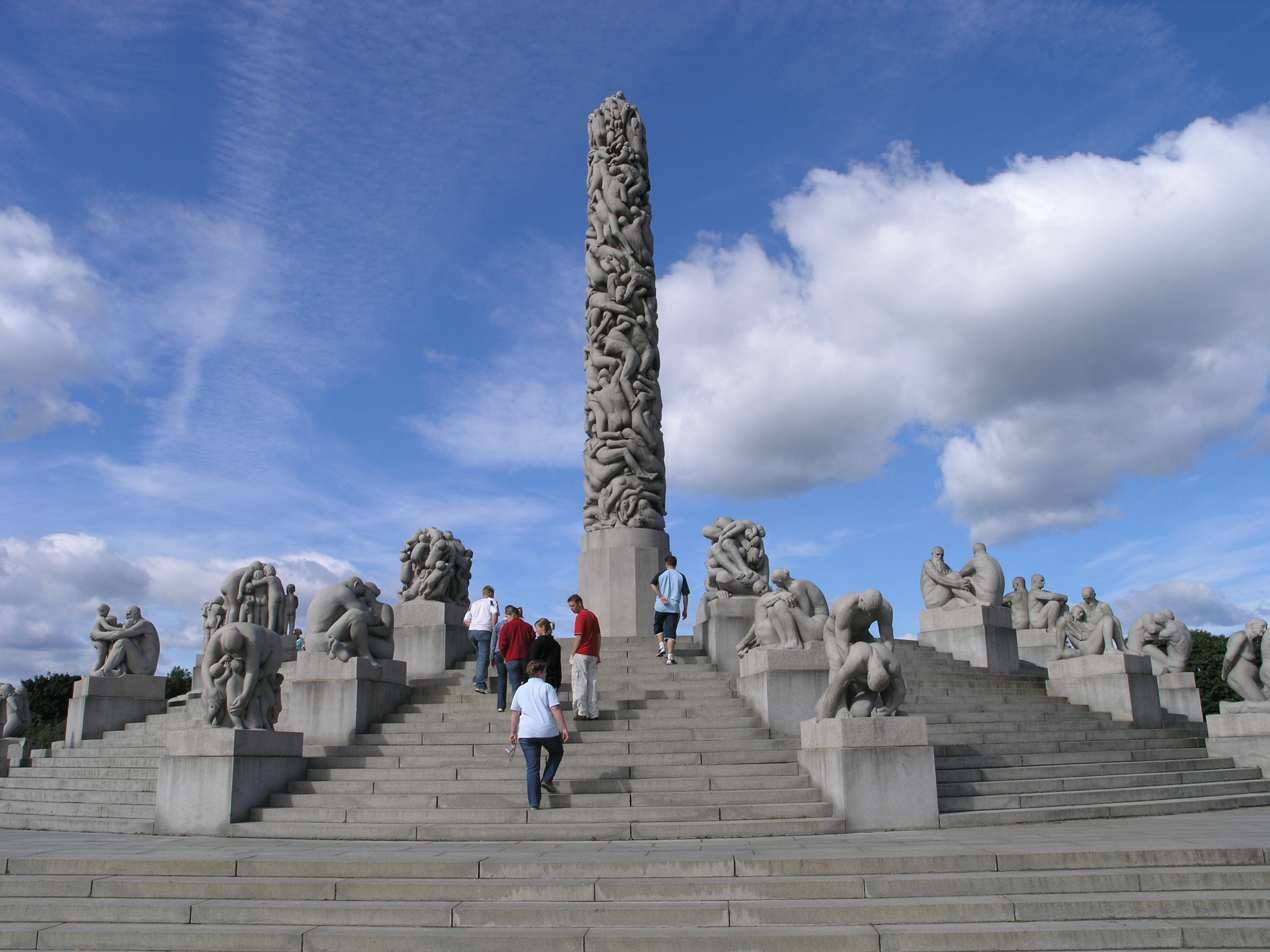
The monolith, sculptures by Gustav Vigeland (part of Vigeland installation in Frogner Park)

- Ekebergparken Sculpture Park, Oslo
- Kistefos Sculpture Park, Jevnaker
- Peer Gynt Sculpture Park, Oslo
- Vigeland installation in Frogner Park, Oslo

=== Romania ===
- Arkhai Sculpture Park, Vlaha

=== Russia ===
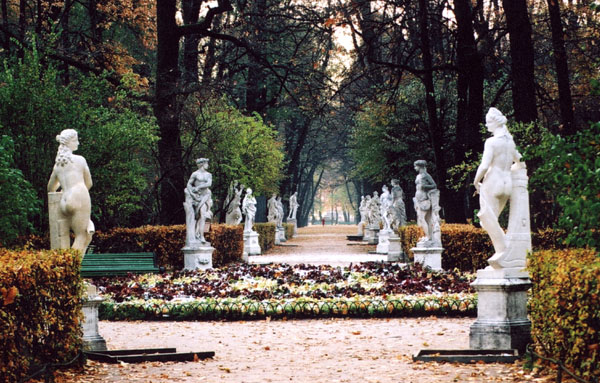
The Summer Garden in St. Petersburg (1716–25) was one of the earliest sculpture parks.

- The Summer Garden (Russian: Летний сад, Letniy Sad) occupies an island between the Fontanka River, Moyka River, and the Swan Canal in Saint Petersburg, and shares its name with the adjacent Summer Palace of Peter the Great.

=== Slovenia ===
- Forma Viva Sculpture Park, Božidar Jakac Art Museum, Kostanjevica na Krki
- Forma viva Sculpture Park, Seča pri Portorožu

=== Spain ===
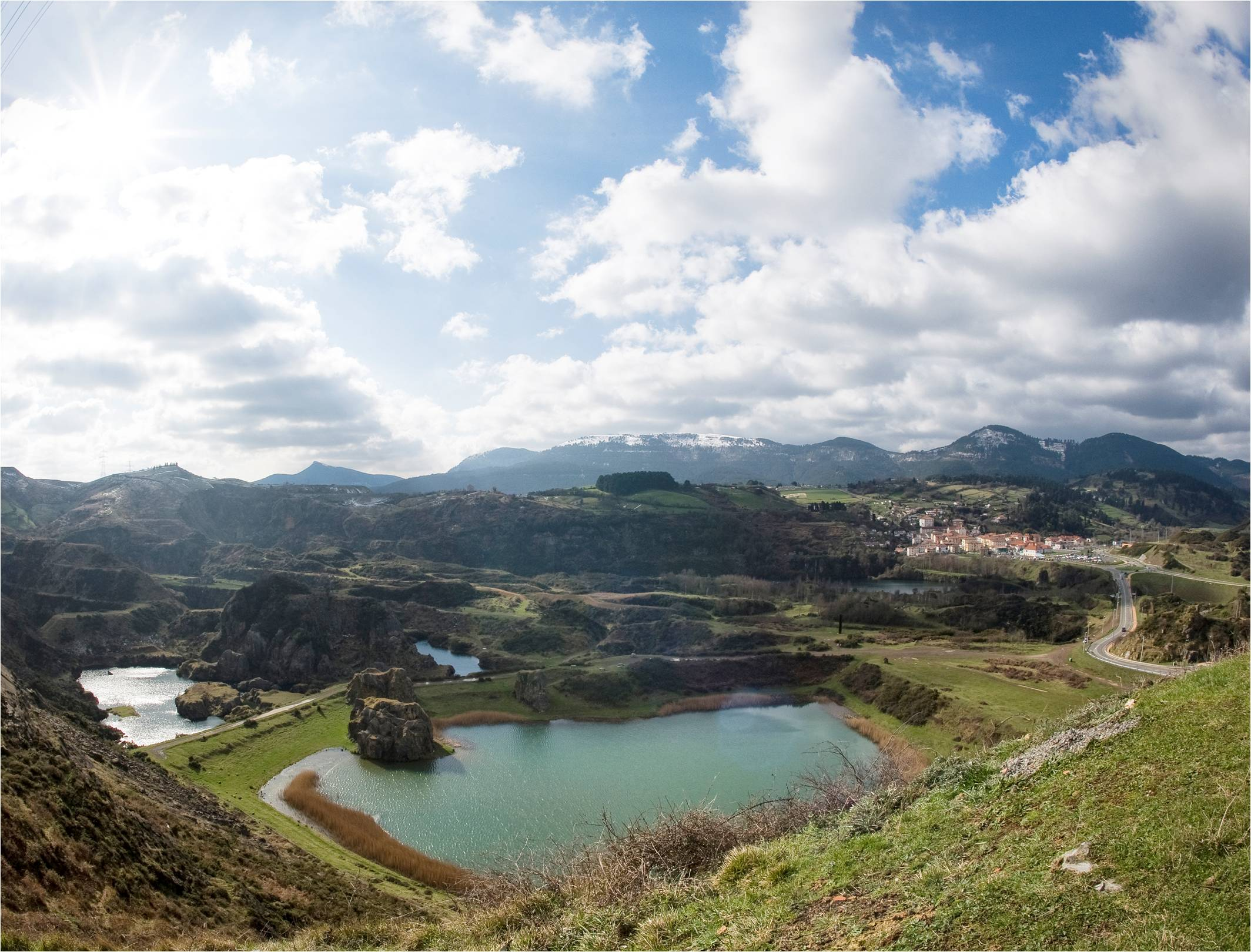
La Arboleda, Zona Minera. Bizkaia – Basque Country

- Meatzalde Goikoa Parke, La Arboleda, Bizkaia. The first exhibition open space dedicated to the sculpture in the Basque Country. Near the Guggenheim Museum of Bilbao.
- Parcart, 17244 Cassà de la Selva, Province of Girona. This sculpture park was founded by Jaume Roser in 2003. It has more than 300 sculptures by different artists.

=== Sweden ===
- Ladonia, illegal sculpture park
- Millesgården Museum, Stockholm
- Wanas Sculpture Park
- Konst på Hög, Kumla

=== Switzerland ===
- Bruno Weber Park in Dietikon and Spreitenbach
- Sculpture at Schoenthal, near Basel
- Fondation Gianadda, Martigny

=== United Kingdom ===
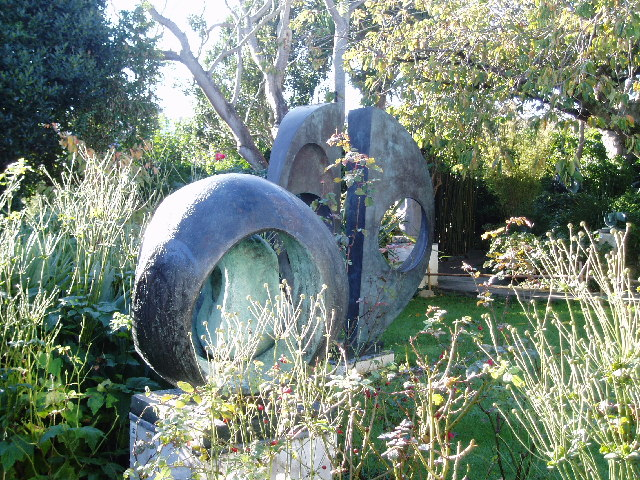
Sphere with Inner Form at the Barbara Hepworth Museum in Trewyn Garden, St Ives, Cornwall, with Two Forms (Divided Circle) behind

- Artparks Sculpture Park, in Guernsey and elsewhere in the UK
- Barbara Hepworth Museum, in St Ives, Cornwall, south-west England, preserves Barbara Hepworth's studio and garden much as they were when she lived and worked there
- Broomhill Sculpture Gardens, in Muddiford, Barnstaple, North Devon, south-west England. A collection of over 300 sculptures sited in 15 acres of woodland garden and river meadow.
- Cass Sculpture Foundation, West Sussex, England (closed in 2020)
- Chatsworth House in Derbyshire. While not a sculpture park as such, the owners of Chatsworth, the Duke and Duchess of Devonshire, have collected and commissioned sculpture to be permanently sited on the estate. These include works by Barry Flanagan, Elisabeth Frink, and William Turnbull in the garden, and commissions by artists Tim Harrisson, David Nash, Allen Jones, Nigel Ross and Alison Crowther in the 1,000-acre (400 ha) park designed by Capability Brown. Since 2006 Chatsworth has hosted 'Beyond Limits', a modern and contemporary sculpture exhibition in the gardens, in conjunction with Sotheby's auction house. This landmark selling exhibition takes place during the months of September and October, annually.
- Chopwell Wood, Tyne and Wear, England.
- Churt, Surrey is home to The Sculpture Park, an exhibition located in an arboretum and water garden.
- Elemental Sculpture Park, Cirencester. England
- Forest of Dean Sculpture Trail in the Forest of Dean in the county of Gloucestershire, England; links several different site-specific sculptures commissioned for the forest
- Goodwood Art Foundation, West Sussex, opened in 2025
- Grizedale Forest sculpture trail
- Irwell Sculpture Trail, the largest public art scheme in the United Kingdom, commissioning regional, national and international artists. It follows a well established 30-mile (48 km) footpath stretching from Salford Quays through Bury into Rossendale and up to the Pennines above Bacup.
- Jupiter Artland, near Edinburgh
- Kielder Forest, Northumberland, England
- Thirsk Hall Sculpture Park, North Yorkshire, opened in 2021.
- Tout Quarry Sculpture Park, Isle of Portland, Dorset, the first sculpture park in a quarry in the UK. Started in 1983 by the Portland Sculpture and Quarry Trust. Includes the work "Still Falling" by Antony Gormley. Tout Quarry is an international venue for a yearly programme of stone carving and sculpture courses that teach skills in direct carving, lettercutting, relief carving and architectural detail. Tout Quarry is also a creative and educational resource for visitors, schools, colleges and universities who come to learn about stone through the Portland Sculpture and Quarry Trust.
- Wyndcliffe Court Sculpture Garden, two exhibitions throughout the year, Spring and Summer with an ever-changing exhibit.
- Yorkshire Sculpture Park, West Yorkshire, England

== North America ==
=== Canada ===
- Animaland Park, defunct sculpture garden and amusement park in New Brunswick
- Boreal Sculpture Garden, St. John's, Newfoundland
- Canadian Centre for Architecture, museum and research centre in Montreal, Quebec. The architect Phyllis Lambert is the founder
- Dante Garden, sculpture garden of Dante's Divine Comedy in Toronto, Ontario.
- Haliburton Sculpture Forest, Dysart et al, Ontario
- Humanics Sanctuary and Sculpture Park, outdoor sculpture park and walking trail in Ottawa, Ontario.
- Jean Drapeau Park outdoor sculptures in Montreal, Quebec.
- Jeffrey Rubinoff Sculpture Park, Hornby Island, British Columbia
- Jock Hildebrand Sculpture Park, outdoor sculpture garden in Westbank, British Columbia
- René Lévesque Park sculpture park in Montreal, Quebec.
- Toronto Sculpture Garden
- Windsor Sculpture Park (formerly Odette Sculpture Park), Windsor, Ontario

=== Mexico ===
- Calle Obregon Boulevard Park in Colonia Roma, Mexico City
- (The) Cancun and Isla Mujeres Underwater Museum, West Coast National Park of Isla Mujeres, Punta Cancún
- Las Pozas, Xilitla, San Luis Potosí

=== United States ===
==== Alabama ====
- Charles W. Ireland Sculpture Garden, Birmingham Museum of Art, Birmingham
- Geri Moulton Sculpture Park (USA Children's Park), University of South Alabama Children's & Women's Hospital, Mobile
- Woods Quad Sculpture Garden, University of Alabama, Tuscaloosa

==== Arizona ====
- (Jack) Jamesen Memorial Sculpture Park, Sedona
- Sedona Arts Center Sculpture Garden, Sedona
- (Alene Dunlop) Smith Garden, Tucson
- Tempe Arts Center and Sculpture Park, Tempe

==== Arkansas ====
- Big Rock Sculpture Park, North Little Rock
- Hot Springs Sculpture Garden, Hot Springs
- Ozarks Woodland Sculpture Garden, Huntsville

==== California ====
- (The Mary and Harry) Blanchard Sculpture Garden, Santa Cruz
- Desert Christ Park, Yucca Valley
- (Robert) Gumbiner Sculpture and Events Garden, Long Beach
- May S. Marcy Sculpture Garden, San Diego
- Franklin D. Murphy Sculpture Garden, UCLA, Los Angeles
- New Guinea Sculpture Garden at Stanford, Stanford
- Queen Califia's Magical Circle, Escondido
- Roseville Sculpture Park, Roseville
- Runnymede Sculpture Farm, Woodside
- Norton Simon Museum Sculpture Garden, Pasadena
- Stanford University, Outdoor Art, Palo Alto
- (Fran and Ray) Stark Sculpture Garden, Los Angeles
- Wildwood Farm Sculpture Garden, Kenwood

==== Colorado ====
- Benson Sculpture Garden / Benson Park Sculpture Garden, Loveland
- Colorado Springs Fine Art Center Sculpture Courtyard and Sculpture Garden, Colorado Springs
- Leaning Tree Museum and Sculpture Garden, Boulder
- Museum of Outdoor Arts, Englewood

==== Connecticut ====
- Aldrich Contemporary Art Museum, Ridgefield
- (Edward Tufte's) Hogpen Hill Farms, Woodbury
- I-Park in East Haddam
- Kouros Gallery Sculpture Center, Ridgefield
- Yale Center for British Art, New Haven

==== Delaware ====
- Copeland Sculpture Garden, Wilmington

==== District of Columbia ====
- Hirshhorn Museum and Sculpture Garden, Washington, D.C., on the National Mall and designed by architect Gordon Bunshaft. It is part of the Smithsonian Institution.
- National Gallery of Art Sculpture Garden
- Statues of the Liberators

==== Florida ====
- Crealdé School of Art Sculpture Garden, Winter Park
- (Martin Z.) Marguiles Sculpture Park, Miami
- (The Ann) Norton Sculpture Gardens, Inc., West Palm Beach
- Albin Polasek Museum and Sculpture Gardens, Winter Park
- Polk Museum of Art Sculpture Garden, Lakeland
- Sculpture Key West, Key West

==== Georgia ====
- Robert T. Webb Sculpture Garden, Dalton

==== Hawaii ====
- Spalding House sculpture garden, Honolulu – (closed)

==== Illinois ====
- Barrington Library Sculpture Garden, Barrington
- Cedarhurst Center for the Arts, Mount Vernon
- Chicago Art Institute, Chicago
- Chicago Athenaeum's International Sculpture Park, Schaumburg
- Chicago Museum of Contemporary Art Sculpture Garden, Chicago
- Farnsworth House, Plano
- (Nathan) Manilow Sculpture Park, University Park
- Museum of Science and Industry Front Lawn, Chicago
- Navy Pier Walk, Chicago
- Oakton Sculpture Park, Des Plaines
- Sculpture Garden of Oakton Park, Skokie
- St. Charles Park District, St. Charles
- Skokie Northshore Sculpture Park, Skokie
- Wandell Sculpture Garden, Urbana
- Wood Street Gallery and Sculpture Garden, Chicago

==== Indiana ====
- Virginia B. Fairbanks Art & Nature Park, Newfields, Indianapolis
- Haan Museum Sculpture Garden, Haan Mansion Museum of Indiana Art, Lafayette
- ARTSPARK, Indianapolis Art Center, Indianapolis
- Sculpture Trails Outdoor Museum, Solsberry

==== Iowa ====
- Des Moines Art Center, Des Moines
- Iowa State University Collection, Ames
- (John and Mary) Pappajohn Sculpture Park, Des Moines

==== Kansas ====
- (Martin H.) Bush Outdoor Sculpture Collection, Wichita
- Johnson Community College Sculpture Collection, Overland Park

==== Kentucky ====
- Josephine Sculpture Park, Frankfort

==== Louisiana ====
- (Sydney & Walda) Besthoff Sculpture Garden, New Orleans
- Chauvin Sculpture Garden, Chauvin
- Neill Corporation Sculpture Gardens, Hammond

==== Maryland ====
- Annmarie Garden, Dowell
- Baltimore Museum of Art Sculpture Garden, Baltimore
- Bufano Sculpture Garden, Baltimore
- Glenstone, Potomac
- Quiet Waters Park, Outdoor Sculptures, Annapolis
- Strathmore Sculpture Garden, North Bethesda
- (Janet and Allen) Wurtzburger and Ryda and Robert H. Levi Sculpture Gardens, Baltimore

==== Massachusetts ====
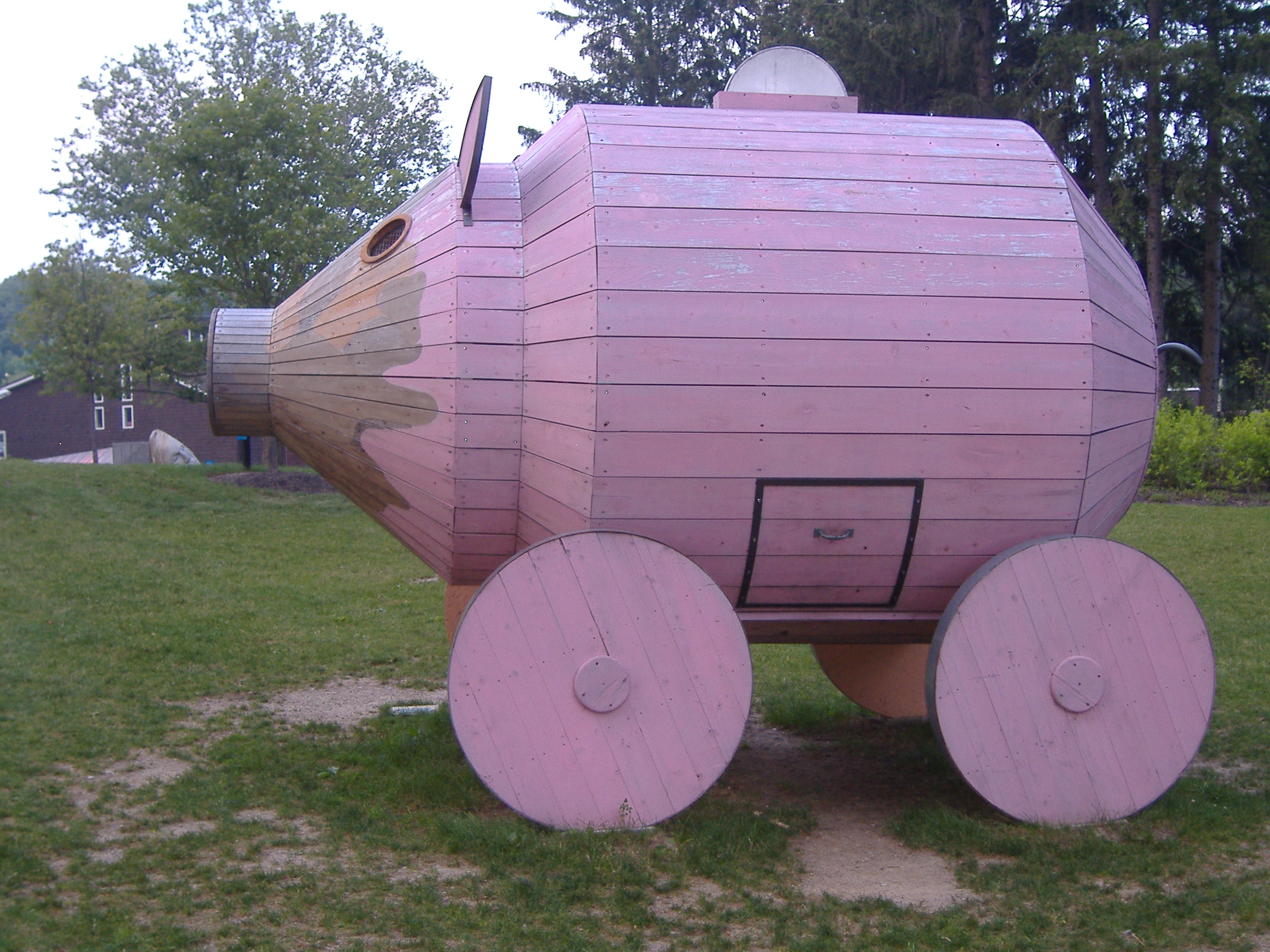
Trojan Piggybank by Aristotle Georgiades and Gail Simpson, 2004, DeCordova Museum and Sculpture Park, Lincoln, Massachusetts

- Arts on the Point, Boston
- Butler Sculpture Park, Sheffield
- Cambridge Arts Council, Cambridge
- DeCordova Museum and Sculpture Park, Lincoln
- Forest Hills Trust, Boston
- List Visual Arts Center (MIT campus), Cambridge
- Mass MOCA, North Adams
- Dr. Seuss Memorial, sculpture garden located at the Quadrangle in Springfield
- Somerby's Landing Sculpture Park, Newburyport
- Turn Park Art Space, West Stockbridge

==== Michigan ====
- (City of) Brighton Walking Sculpture Garden, Brighton
- Cranbrook Academy, Bloomfield Hills
- Krasl Art Center, St. Joseph
- Lakenenland, Marquette
- Lincoln Street Art Park, Detroit
- Frederik Meijer Gardens and Sculpture Park, Grand Rapids Township in Kent County
- Michigan Legacy Art Park, Thompsonville
- Northern Michigan University Sculpture Walk, Marquette
- Western Michigan University Sculpture Tour Program, Kalamazoo

==== Minnesota ====
- Caponi Art Park and Learning Center, Eagan, a 60-acre (240,000 m^{2}) wooded sculpture garden and performance space
- Franconia Sculpture Park, Shafer
- General Mills Art Collection Sculpture Program, Minneapolis
- Harrison Sculpture Garden at Minnesota Landscape Arboretum, Chanhassen
- Minneapolis Sculpture Garden, Minneapolis, an 11-acre (45,000 m^{2}) park near the Walker Art Center
- North High Bridge Sculpture Garden & Park, Saint Paul
- Weisman Art Museum, public art at University of Minnesota Twin Cities, Minneapolis
- Western Sculpture Park, Saint Paul

==== Mississippi ====
- Yokna Sculpture Trail, Oxford

==== Missouri ====
- Blanke Sculpture Terrace, St. Louis
- Daum Museum of Contemporary Art, Sedalia
- Jeske Sculpture Park, Ferguson
- Kansas City Sculpture Park, Kansas City
- Kemper Museum of Art, Kansas City
- Laumeier Sculpture Park, St. Louis
- Henry Lay Sculpture Park, St. Louis University campus, Louisiana
- Serra Sculpture Park, St. Louis

==== Montana ====
- Bozeman Sculpture Park, Bozeman
- Tippet Rise Art Center, Fishtail

==== Nebraska ====
- Carhenge near Alliance
- Prairie Peace Park, Lincoln
- Sheldon Memorial Art Gallery and Sculpture Garden at UNL

==== Nevada ====
- Goldwell Open Air Museum, Amargosa Valley
- Michael Hizer's Double Negative, Overton
- Nevada Museum of Art, Reno

==== New Hampshire ====
- Andres Institute of Art, Brookline
- Bedrock Gardens, Lee

==== New Jersey ====
- Burlington County College Sculpture Park, Pemberton
- Clifton Municipal Sculpture Park, Clifton
- Grounds For Sculpture, Hamilton Township, a 35-acre (140,000 m^{2}) garden and museum founded by J. Seward Johnson, Jr., grandson of Johnson & Johnson founder Robert Wood Johnson
- Ironstone Sculpture Garden, Woodstown
- Newark Museum Sculpture Garden, Newark
- (John B.) Putnam, Jr., Memorial Collection, Princeton
- Quietude Garden Gallery, East Brunswick

==== New Mexico ====
- Albuquerque Museum Sculpture Garden, Albuquerque
- (Phil & Olga) Eaton Sculpture Garden, Albuquerque
- El Ancon Sculpture Park, Ribera
- Lightning Field, Corrales
- Lumina Sculpture Garden, Taos
- Shidoni Gallery and Sculpture Garden, Tesuque

==== New York ====
- Adirondack – Sacandaga River Sculpture Park, Wells
- Albright–Knox Art Gallery, Buffalo
- Art Omi, Ghent
- Battery Park City Outdoor Sculptures, Manhattan
- Bradford Graves Sculpture Park, Kerhonkson
- Buckhorn, Pound Ridge
- (Iris & Gerald) Cantor Roof Garden, Manhattan
- Central Park Conservancy Sculpture Tour, Manhattan
- Circle Museum, Austerlitz
- The Cloisters, Manhattan
- Dia Beacon, Beacon
- DIA Foundation, Manhattan
- André Emmerich Top Gallant Farm, Pawling
- Everson Museum of Art, Syracuse
- The Fields Sculpture Park, Ghent
- Griffis Sculpture Park, Ashford Hollow
- Hofstra University Sculpture Garden, Hempstead
- Donald M. Kendall Sculpture Gardens at PepsiCo Headquarters, Purchase
- Kykuit Gardens, Sleepy Hollow
- LongHouse Reserve, East Hampton
- The C Lyon Sculpture Garden, Horseheads
- MoMA Abby Aldrich Rockefeller Sculpture Garden, Manhattan
- Morgan Library & Museum, Manhattan
- Museum of Jewish Heritage Living Memorial to the Holocaust, Manhattan
- Nassau County Museum of Art and Sculpture, Roslyn Harbor
- Neuberger Museum of Art and Sculpture Garden, Purchase
- Louise Nevelson Plaza, Manhattan
- Isamu Noguchi Garden Museum, Long Island City
- OPUS 40, Saugerties
- Pacem in Terris, Warwick
- Plattsburgh Sculpture Park at the State University of New York, Plattsburgh
- Pratt Institute Sculpture Park, Brooklyn
- PS-1 Contemporary Art Center/NYMMA, Long Island City
- Rocky Point Park and Preserve, Rocky Point
- Salem Art Works (SAW), Salem
- Sculpture Center, Long Island City
- Sculpture Space, Utica
- Socrates Sculpture Park, Long Island City
- The Solo Sculpture Garden by The C Lyon, Horseheads
- Stone Ledge Sculpture Garden, Plattsburgh
- Stone Quarry Hill Art Park, Cazenovia
- Storm King Art Center, Mountainville, a "sculpture landscape"
- Studio Museum in Harlem Sculpture Garden, Manhattan
- Taconic Sculpture Park, Spencertown
- Unison Arts and Learning Center, New Paltz

==== North Carolina ====
- Carolina Bronze Sculpture Garden and Foundry, Seagrove
- Chapel Hill Public Arts Program, Chapel Hill
- Davidson Sculpture Garden, Davidson
- North Carolina Museum of Art Park, Raleigh
- Western North Carolina Sculpture Park Happy Valley
- Winston-Salem State Sculpture Garden, Winston-Salem

==== Ohio ====
- Columbus Museum of Art Sculpture Park, Columbus
- Pyramid Hill Sculpture Park, Hamilton
- Rio Grande Sculpture Park, Rio Grande
- Rosenthal Contemporary Arts Center, Cincinnati
- The Sculpture Center, Cleveland
- Topiary Park, Columbus
- University of Cincinnati – Fine Arts Collection, Outdoor Sculpture garden Cincinnati
- (Georgia and David K.) Welles Sculpture Garden, Toledo

==== Oklahoma ====
- Philbrook Museum of Art, Tulsa

==== Oregon ====
- Evan H. Roberts Sculpture Mall, Portland

==== Pennsylvania ====
- Abington Art Center Sculpture Garden, Jenkintown
- (Philip and Muriel) Berman Sculpture Park, Allentown
- The Bower: Native Garden and Sculpture Park, Shermans Dale
- (Madeline K.) Butcher Sculpture Garden and the Morris Arboretum, Philadelphia
- Drexel University, Philadelphia
- Fairmount Park / International Sculpture Garden, Philadelphia
- Kentuck Knob, Chalkhill
- Lookout Sculpture Park, Damascus
- (Patricia D.) Pfundt Sculpture Garden, Doylestown
- Pittston Susquehanna River Sculpture Park, Pittston
- Rhoneymeade Arboretum and Sculpture Garden, Centre Hall
- (James) Wolf Sculpture Trail, Johnstown

==== Puerto Rico ====
- Sculpture Garden of the Museo de Arte de Puerto Rico, San Juan

==== South Carolina ====
- Brookgreen Gardens, Murrells Inlet
- Jackson Gallery & Sculpture Garden, Aiken
- South Carolina Botanical Garden and Sculpture Garden, Clemson

==== South Dakota ====
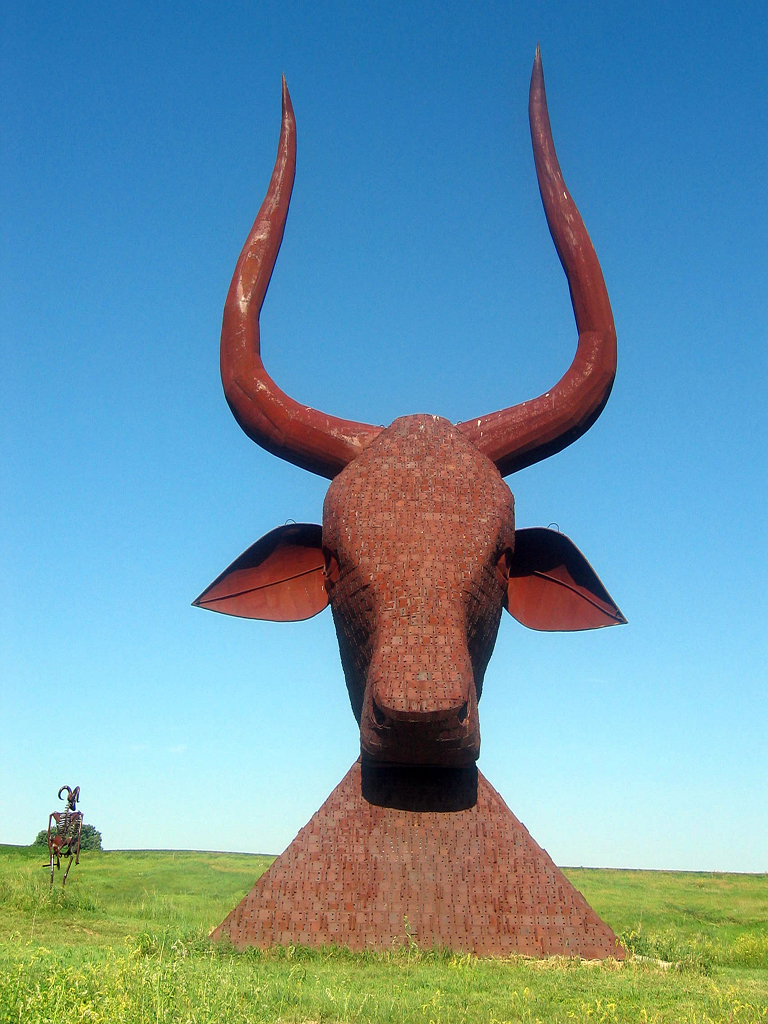
Egyptian Bull's Head, Porter Sculpture Park, Montrose, South Dakota

- Porter Sculpture Park, Montrose
- Presidents Park Sculpture Garden, Lead

==== Tennessee ====
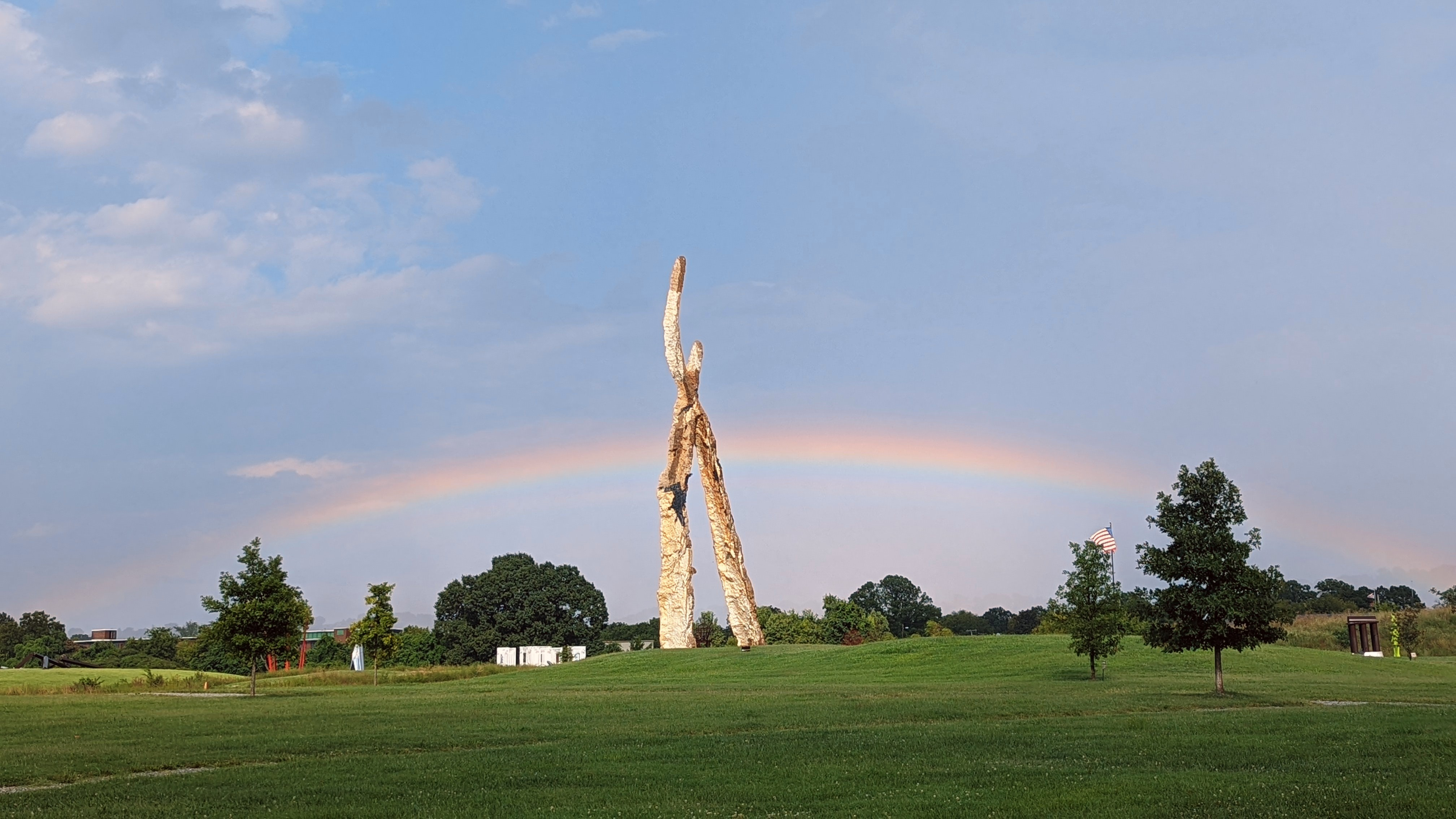
- Peter Lundberg's "Anchors" is one of 40+ colossal sculptures featured at Sculpture Fields at Montague Park in Chattanooga, Tennessee.
  Cheekwood – Carell Sculpture Trail, Nashville
- Hunter Museum of American Art, Sculpture Garden, Chattanooga
- (Charles) Krutch Park, Knoxville
- River Gallery Sculpture Garden, Chattanooga
- Sculpture Fields at Montague Park, Chattanooga

==== Texas ====
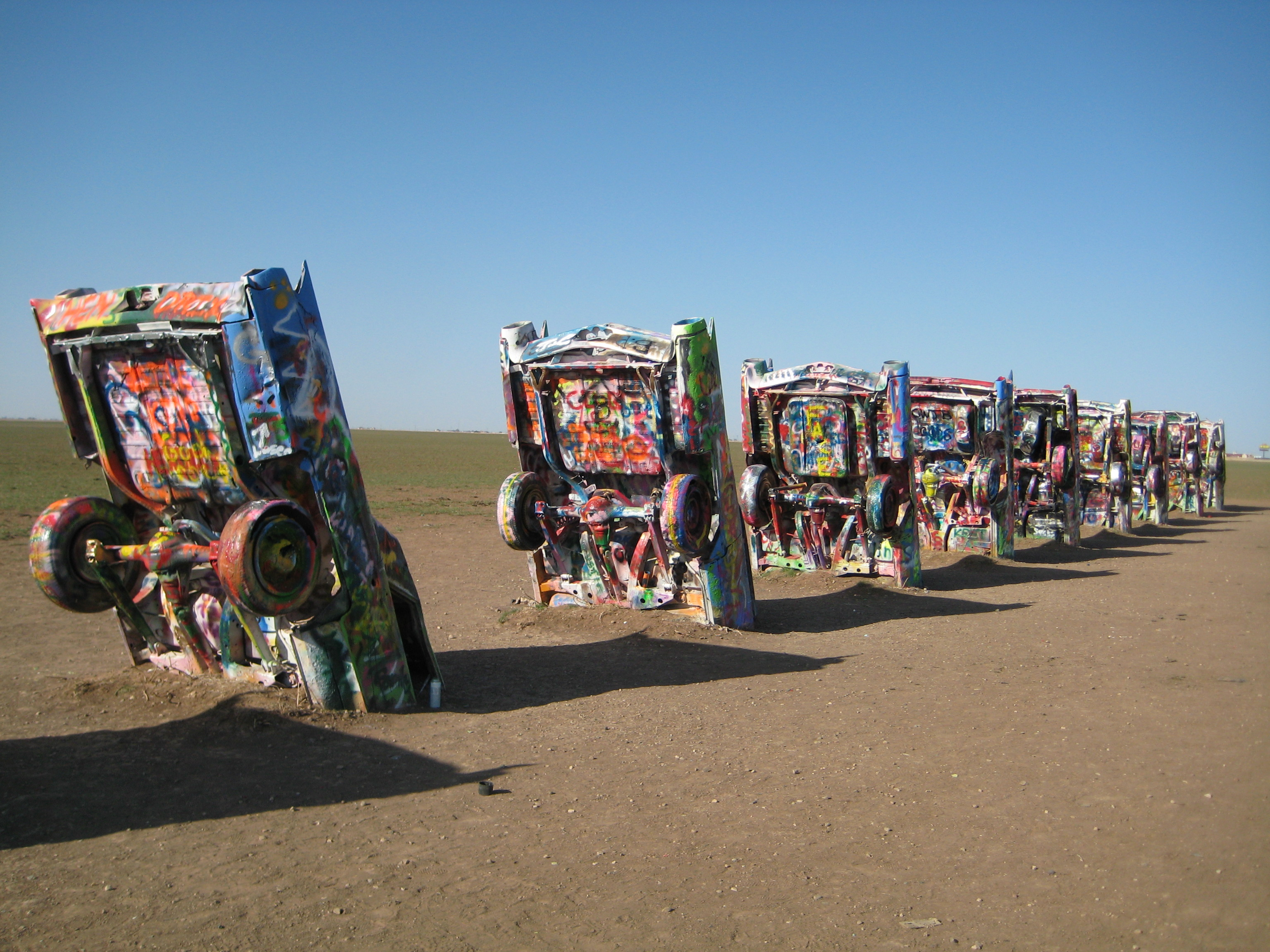
Cadillac Ranch, Amarillo, Texas

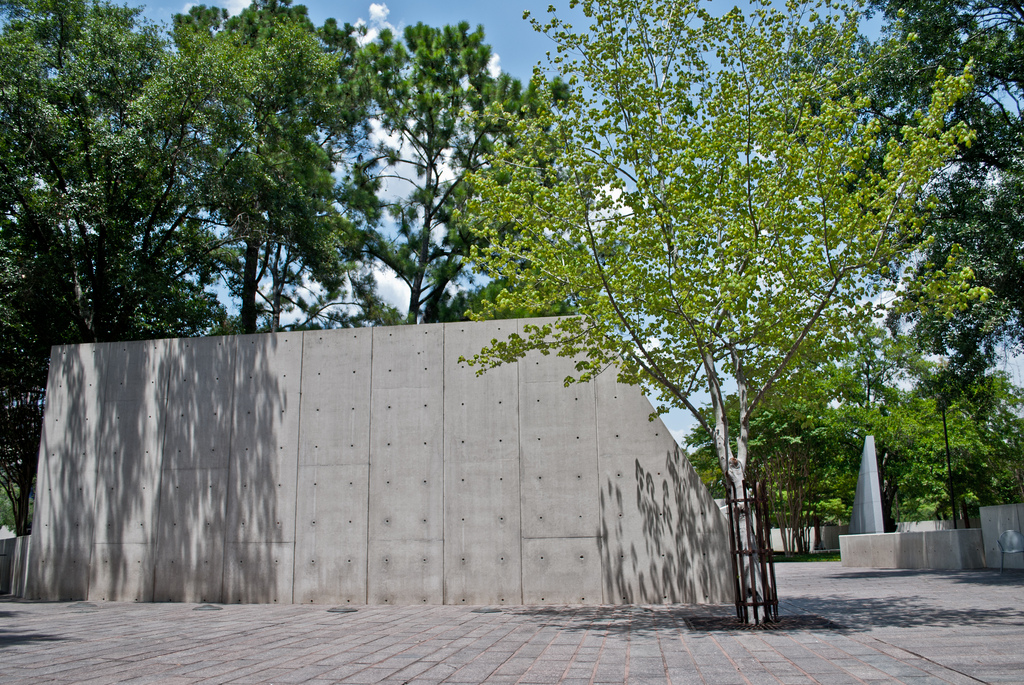
The Lillie and Hugh Roy Cullen Sculpture Garden in Houston, TX

- Blossom Street Gallery & Sculpture Garden, Houston
- Buffalo Bayou Artpark, Houston
- Cadillac Ranch, Amarillo
- Chinati Foundation, Marfa
- (Lillie and Hugh Roy) Cullen Sculpture Garden, Houston
- Dallas Museum of Art, Dallas
- Huntington Sculpture Foundation, Coupland
- Liberty Hill International Sculpture Park, Liberty Hill
- McNay Art Museum, San Antonio
- Meadows Museum Sculpture Plaza, Dallas
- (The) Menil Collection, Houston
- Museo Benini, Marble Falls
- Nasher Sculpture Center, Dallas
- NorthPark Center, Dallas
- Rachofsky House, Dallas
- Rice University, James Turrell Skyspace, Houston
- Rothko Chapel & Sculpture Reflection Pool, Houston
- San Antonio Museum of Art Sculpture Garden, San Antonio
- Strake Jesuit College Preparatory, Houston
- Texas Sculpture Garden, Frisco
- Umlauf Sculpture Garden and Museum, Austin

==== Utah ====
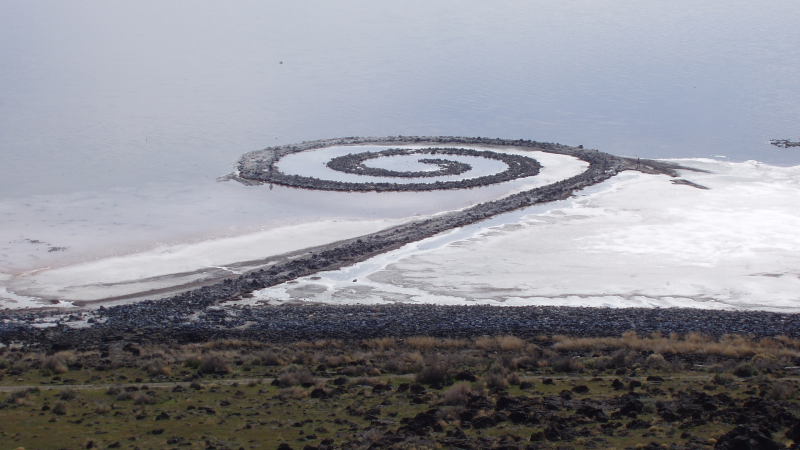
Spiral Jetty, Robert Smithson, 1970, near Brigham City, Utah

- Gilgal Sculpture Garden by Thomas Childs, Salt Lake City
- Metaphor: The Tree of Utah by Karl Momen, near Wendover
- Spiral Jetty by Robert Smithson, near Brigham City (in the Great Salt Lake)

==== Vermont ====
- Marble Street Sculpture Park, West Rutland
- North Bennington Art Park, North Bennington
- Spirit of Place, Huntington
- Vermont Arts Council, Montpelier
- West Branch Gallery and Sculpture Park, Stowe
- West Rutland Art Park, West Rutland

==== Virginia ====
- National Memorial Park, Falls Church
- Virginia Museum of Fine Arts, Richmond

==== Washington ====
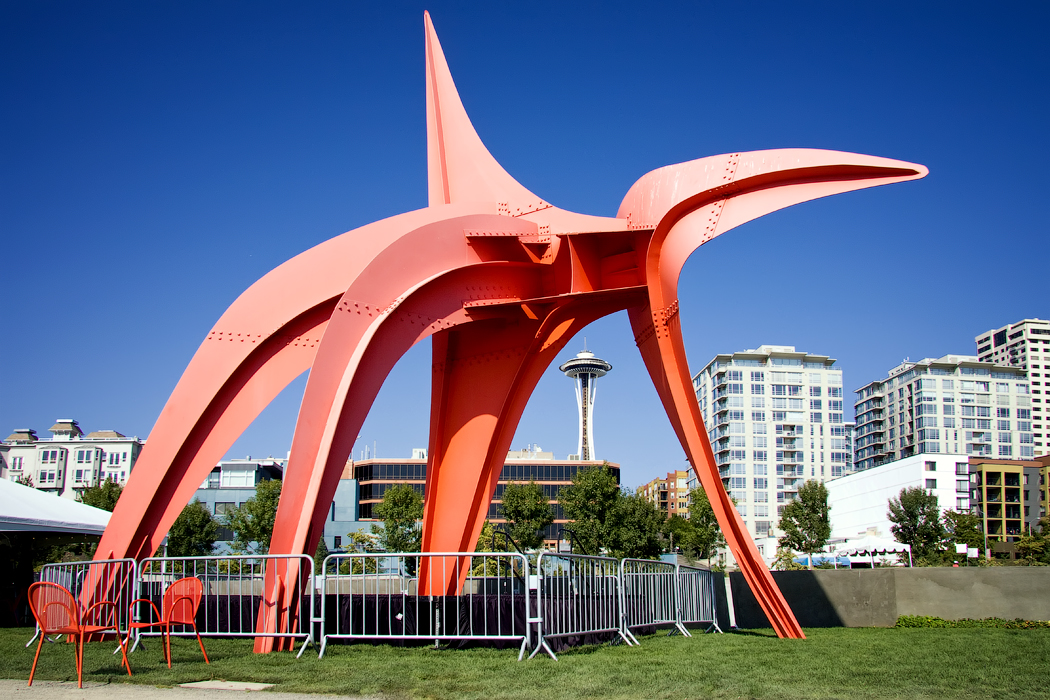
Eagle, by Alexander Calder, 1971, Olympic Sculpture Park, Seattle

- Earth Sanctuary Sculpture Garden, Whidbey Island
- Monarch Contemporary Art Center and Sculpture Park, Olympia
- Olympic Sculpture Park, Seattle
- SJI Sculpture Park, Friday Harbor
- Spokane Sculpture Walk, Spokane
- Western Washington University Campus Sculpture, Bellingham
- Whitman College Campus Sculpture, Walla Walla

==== Wisconsin ====
- (Margaret Woodson) Fischer Sculpture Gallery, Wausau
- Lynden Sculpture Garden, Milwaukee
- Jurustic Park
- Mississippi River Sculpture Park, Prairie du Chien
- Prairie Moon Sculpture Park, Cochrane
- Stevens Point Sculpture Park, Stevens Point
- Wisconsin Concrete Park, Phillips
- Woodlot Outdoor Sculpture Gallery, Sheboygan

== Oceania ==
=== Australia ===
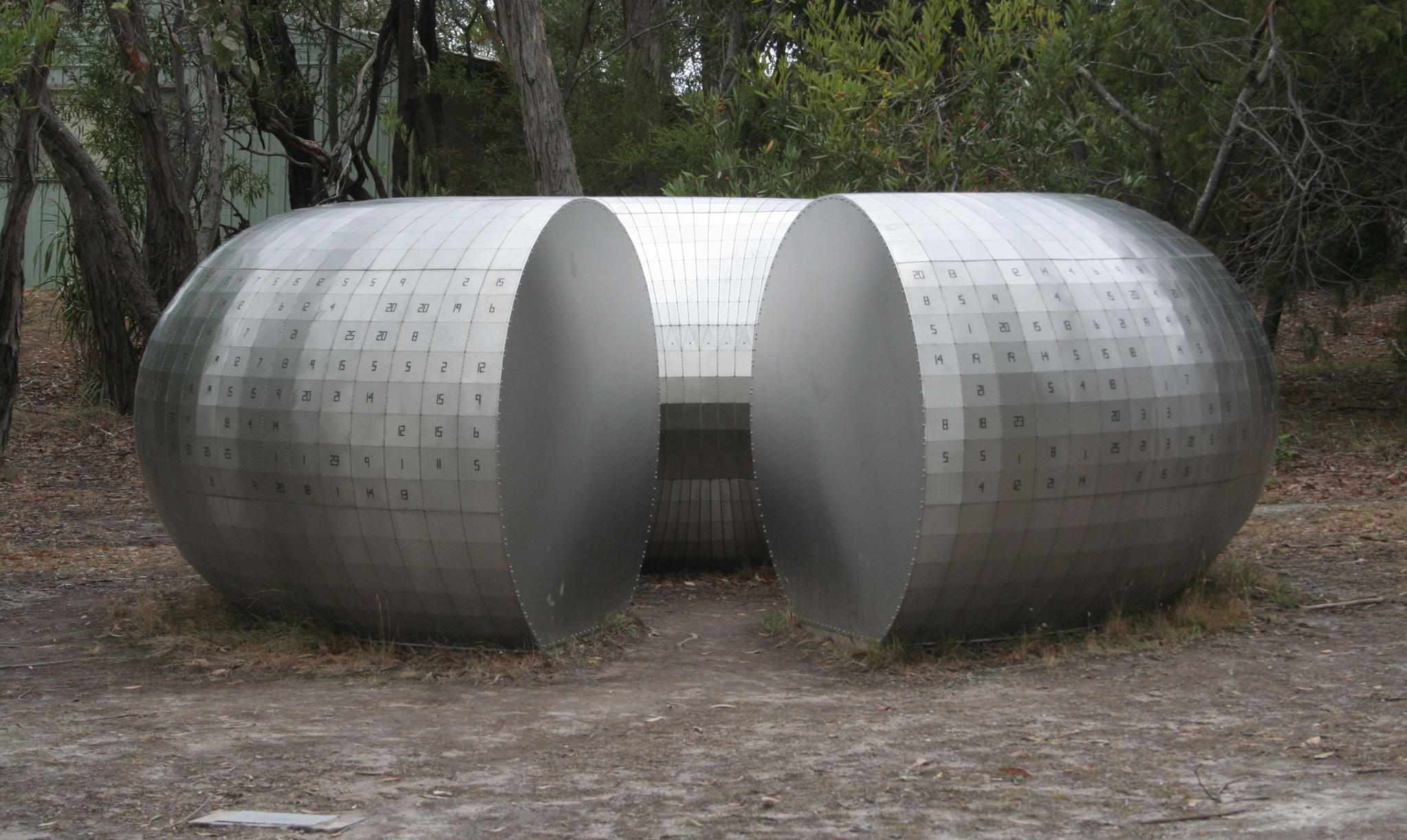
Torus – Hidden and revealed, Adrian Page, 2003, McClelland Gallery and Sculpture Park, Langwarrin, Victoria

- Glenorchy Art and Sculpture Park (GASP), an award-winning parkland located along the foreshore of Elwick Bay in Glenorchy, Tasmania
- Heide Museum of Modern Art Sculpture Park in Bulleen near Melbourne. Sculptures are permanently exhibited.
- Lyons Sculpture Park, 15-acre (61,000 m^{2}) sculpture park in Lyons, western Victoria
- McClelland Gallery and Sculpture Park, public sculpture garden in Langwarrin near Melbourne
- National Gallery of Australia has a sculpture park from the gallery to the banks of Lake Burley Griffin. One of the permanent exhibits in the park is a fern garden designed by Fiona Hall.

=== New Zealand ===
- Gibbs Farm, Kaipara, Northland
- Hills Golf Course Sculpture Trail, Arrowtown, Otago
- Hotere Garden Oputae, Port Chalmers, Otago
- Waitakaruru Arboretum, Hamilton, Waikato

== South America ==
=== Brazil ===
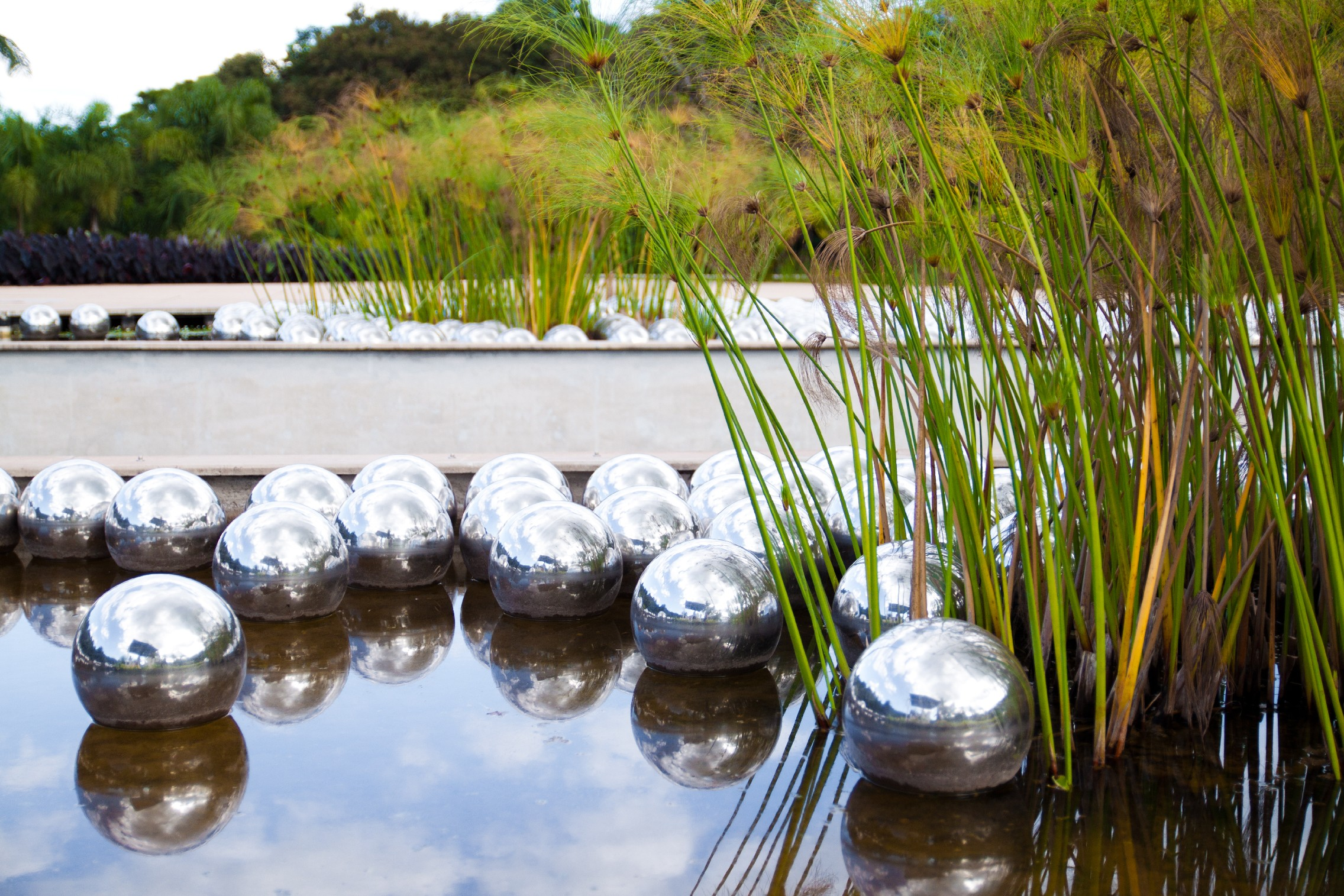
Sculpture by Yayoi Kusama, Inhotim, Brumadinho, Brazil

- Centro de Arte Contemporânea Inhotim, Brumadinho, Minas Gerais

=== Colombia ===
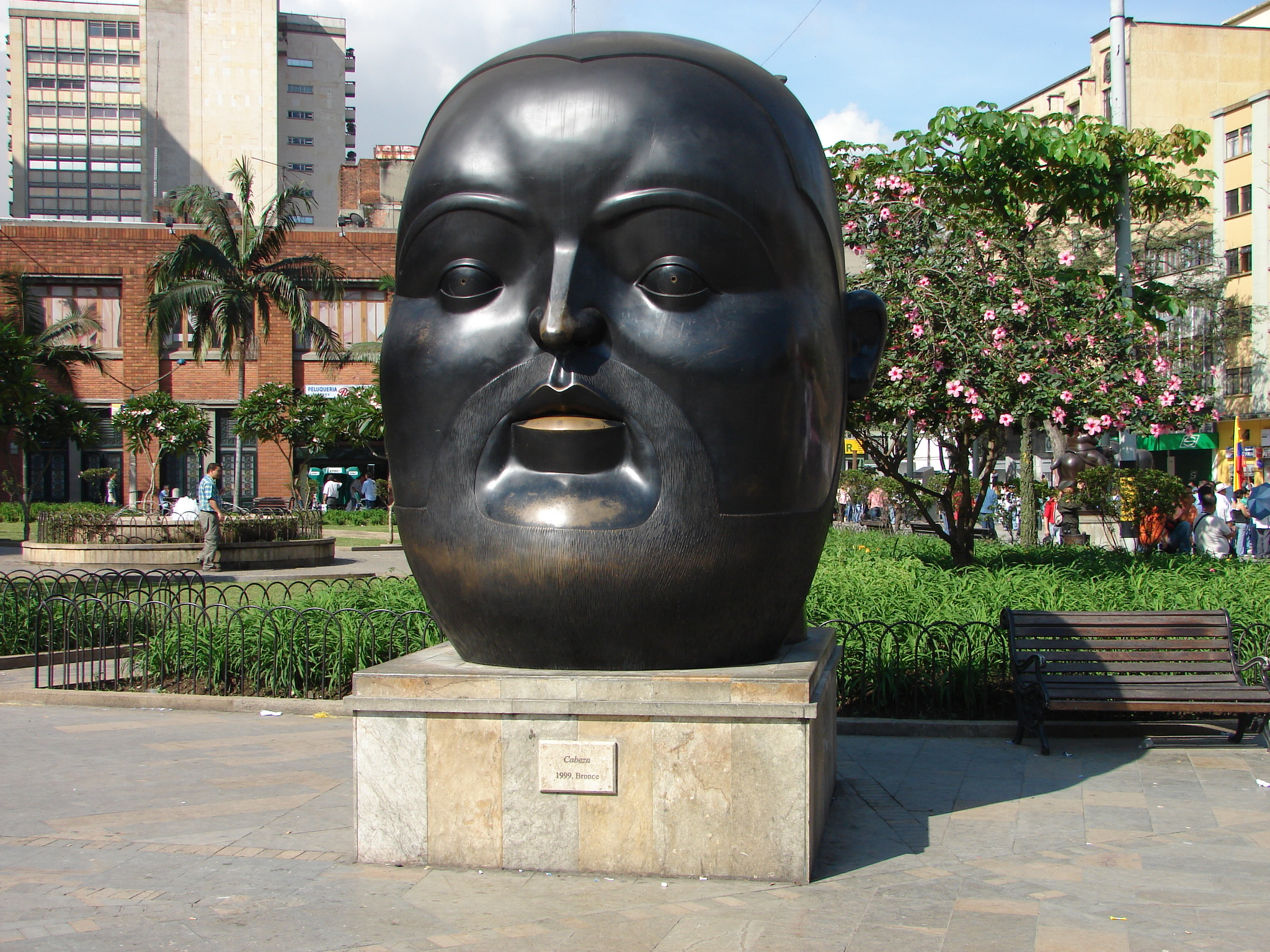
Head, Botero Plaza, Medellín, Colombia

- Botero Plaza, Medellín
- Hacienda Nápoles, the estate created by drug lord Pablo Escobar and now owned by the Colombian government, boasts of some statues of dinosaurs (built with bones), and pre-historic animals (such as the mammoth, that children can climb and play on), as well as decommissioned military vehicles, and a giant hand sculpture.
- Nutibara sculpture park, Medellín

== See also ==
- Ice sculpture
- Outline of sculpture
- Sculpture garden
- Sculpture trail
- Sensory garden
