= Liberty Hill International Sculpture Park =

Sculpture garden in Liberty Hill, Texas

Coordinates: 30.663°N 97.909°W

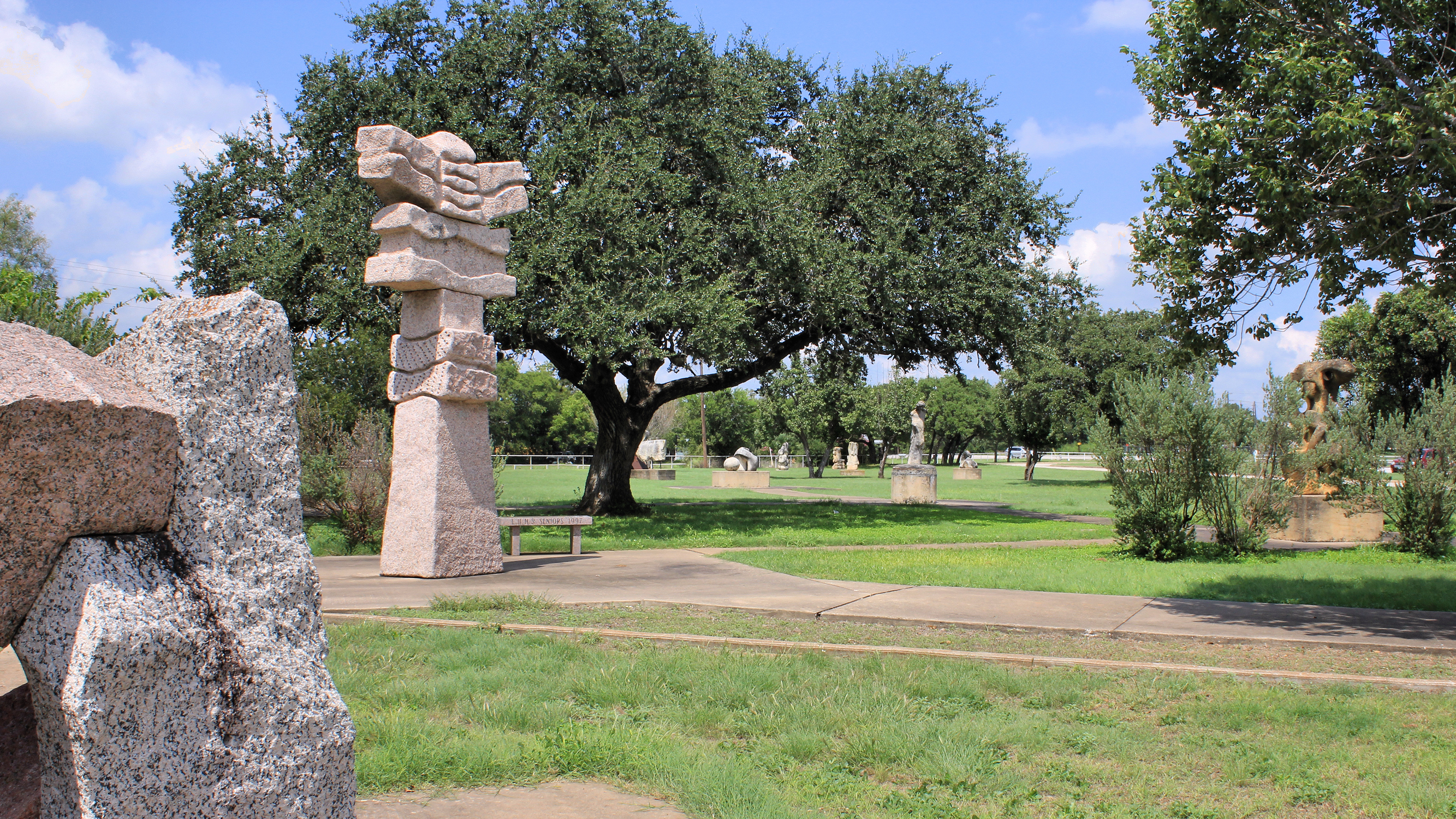
Liberty Hill International Sculpture Park

The Liberty Hill International Sculpture Park resides in Liberty Hill, Texas. The Sculpture Garden is the result of an International Sculpture Symposium held in the town in 1976. There are currently 27 pieces created by various artists from 6 different countries, including, France, Germany, Italy, Japan, Canada, and the United States. The symposium project won the town of Liberty Hill the first Texas Arts Award for a city with a population under 100,000 in 1977.

== History ==
=== International symposium ===
In the early 1970s, Mel Fowler, a painter and sculptor, came to Liberty Hill, Texas. Fowler attended an International Sculpture Symposium in Europe in 1975. On his return to Liberty Hill he began to organize a site for the first international sculpture symposium in the southwest. Initially, Fowler aimed to host the symposium in Austin, Texas, but a local of Liberty Hill, James Vaughan, convinced him to hold the symposium in the small town. In celebration of the U.S. bicentennial, during the fall of 1976, the town hosted 25 sculptors from 6 different countries. Many local families provided room and board for the artists, and many local organizations provided meals. Local companies also supplied all of the materials for the sculptures. Native granite, concrete, and steel were the primary materials used. The entire symposium took place without any state or federal money. The symposium resulted in a park of abstract sculptures located in downtown Liberty Hill at Veterans Park.

=== Dedication ===
The sculptures remained in Veterans Park for 10 years while Fowler attempted to raise funds to buy a larger piece of land for the sculptures. In the mid-1980s, Don Cunningham, a new administrative assistant for Liberty Hill Independent School District, wished to purchase a piece of granite from one of the sculptures for a sign for the new high school. After negotiations, the school district accepted all of the sculptures as part of a landscape for the high school. On May 5, 1987, after a massive moving effort, the sculptures were dedicated on the grounds of Liberty Hill High School (now Louine Noble Elementary School). It became the only recorded site of an International Sculpture Park on school grounds. Several sculptures were added after the symposium and dedication, including one by Jim Thomas and several by Mel Fowler, bringing the total to 27 pieces in the park.

== Future ==
Currently, some of the sculptures are being moved from the middle school to the adjacent Lions Foundation Park, run by the Liberty Hill Development Board. The sculptures will remain partially on the school grounds, partially in Foundation Park, with a clear walking trail between the pieces. A re-dedication of the park is set to occur in late April 2013.

== Sculptors and sculptures ==
The following lists the sculptors and the piece created for the park at Liberty Hill. The list is categorized by country of origin or residence. Some artists have two countries listed due to multiple residences at the time of the symposium. Two pieces from the original symposium were destroyed as noted. Thomas created a sculpture for the dedication in 1987, and Fowler added three pieces after the original symposium.

=== Canada ===
- Harry Noordhoek (Canada and Italy) - Fluidity
- Bart Shigeru Uchida - Crawling Venus
- Dieter Hastenteufel (Canada and Germany) - Frozen Motion

=== Italy ===
- Renato Mari - Faces of the People

=== France ===
- Jean Marmorat - Sans Titra
- Jean Paul Philippe - Tirez Moi De La

=== Germany ===
- Renata Reck - Evolution No. 2

=== Japan ===
- Masayuki Nagase - Lover's Seats
- Mihama Yoshinao - Lotus

=== U.S. ===
- Duff Browne - Images
- Catchi - Official Artist of the 1976 Symposium
- Sharon Corgan Leeber - Liberty Couple
- Dolores Cumley - Origin
- Nati Escobedo - Tierra Madre
- David Eugene Everett - Untitled (Destroyed by vandalism)
- Mel Fowler:
  - Liberty Cat
  - Libertarian
  - Misterio di Vita
  - San Francescao
- Brad Goldberg - Guardian
- Mary Paige Huey - Phoenix (Molds were damaged by foundry in process of re-work)
- T.J. Mabrey - Untitled
- Ann Merck - Western Vision
- Tom Piccolo - Blanco Mujer
- Copper Rain Ward - Mother's Lap
- Tom Sayre - John's Knot
- Dana Smith - Verdie Vaughan
- Rita Sutcliffe - Night Guardian
- Jim Thomas - Forgotten Ancestors
- Arthur Williams - Space 13

== See also ==
- Sculpture Garden
- List of Sculpture Parks
- International Sculpture Symposium
