= Erich Engelbrecht Sculpture Park =

Monumental sculptures from Erich Engelbrecht

Sculpture Park Engelbrecht
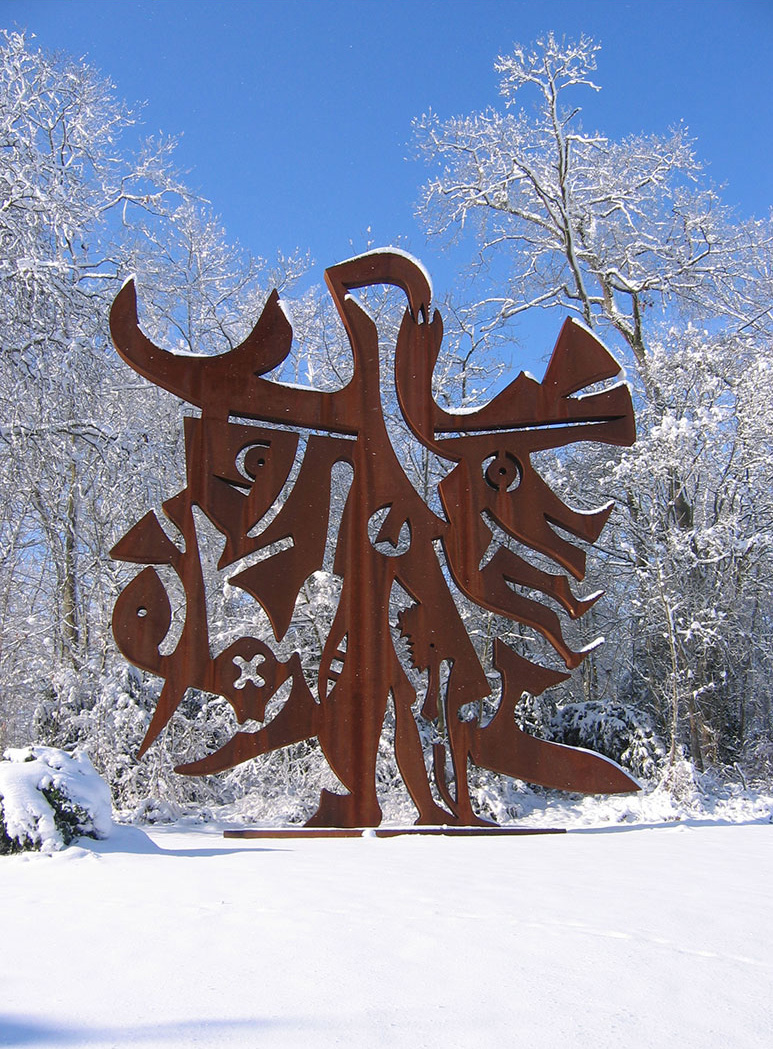
- The Blacksmith, I (Der Schmied, I)

- Location within France
- Established: between 2002-2011
- Location: Château des Fougis, 03220 Thionne, France
- Coordinates: 46.427000°N 3.564566°E
- Collections: Monumental massive steel sculptures by Erich Engelbrecht & a private exhibition with previous works by the same

Sculpture Park in the map of Auvergne-Rhône-Alpes.
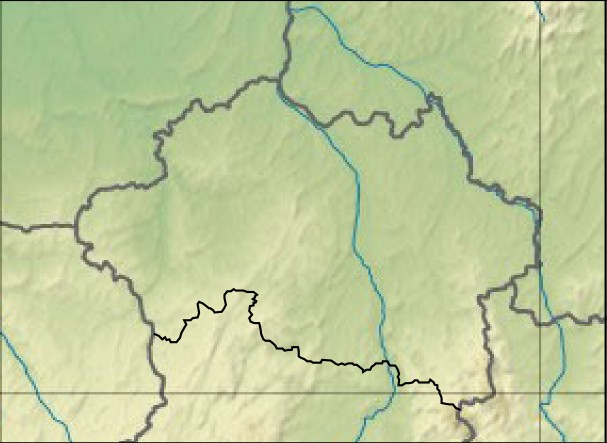
Sculpture Park in the map of Allier.

The Sculpture Park Erich Engelbrecht (French: Parc de sculptures Engelbrecht) is located at the Château des Fougis, 03220 Thionne, department of Allier, France, and displays steel sculptures of the German artist Erich Engelbrecht.

In 2001, Erich Engelbrecht bought the property with the intent of installing his Sculpture Park throughout the gardens and former farming and hunting fields of Château des Fougis.

On loan from a private collection, the artist and his wife also mounted a second exhibition in the main wing of the castle, presenting some previous works like large format tapestries, oil paintings, small steel figures and graphics.

== Les Fougis (the site) ==
“In the 15th century, according to tradition, Les Fougis were the hunting grounds of the Bourbons. In 1495 records exist of financial payments between Duke Charles the 3rd and Hughes le Long, Lord of Fougis and provost of the Duke’s Hunting. Earlier still, there’s a reference to the Lord of Fougis in an inventory written in 1410 by Pierre Bodet for Guichard Dauphin, Lord of Jaligny. In fact, the family le Long were the registered holders of les Fougis from 1461 onwards, through squire Hugonin le Long, who was also provost of the Hunting of Pierre the 2nd. The Le Longs retained the ownership of Les Fougis until 1727, the date on which the territory was bequeathed to a nephew, Jean Berthier de Bizy. Their descendants retained it until the French Revolution. In 1802 it was bought by Antoine Clayeux, whose family owns the site to the present day.

Rebuilt at the end of the 16th century (a doorway in classic style is dated 1593) the Fougis have walls pierced with more decorative openings. A description from Nicolas de Nicolay in 1569 states ‘fort chasteau, terre et seigneurie…’ (strong castle, land, and lordship...)

The château is composed of a main rectangular building, flanked by two square towers on its southwest and northeast corners, and a round tower to the southeast. A second perpendicular wing to the north is also flanked by another square tower on its east corner. The walls are made of red and dark brown brickwork, paired to form lozenge patterns. The openings are framed with white limestone. The north façade and some windows to the other sides were modified throughout the end of the 19th century.”

At the turn of the 19th to the 20th centuries, the house was completely renovated and remodeled. The main courtyard received arcades on both wings, one of them with a glazed loggia. The north wing became an extra floor for the extended family and services. The interiors present a language typical for the period.

After acquiring the property, Erich Engelbrecht undertook a multitude of renovation and building works on the fields and buildings to adapt Les Fougis for these exhibitions.

Some of his family members settled in Fougis, where they presently live and work.

== Erich Engelbrecht (the artist) ==
Erich Engelbrecht (Bielefeld, 27 October 1928-Vichy, France, 21 July 2011) was a German artist who left a number of works in the fields of painting, graphics, tapestry, sculpture, architecture, and poetry.

== List of sculptures ==
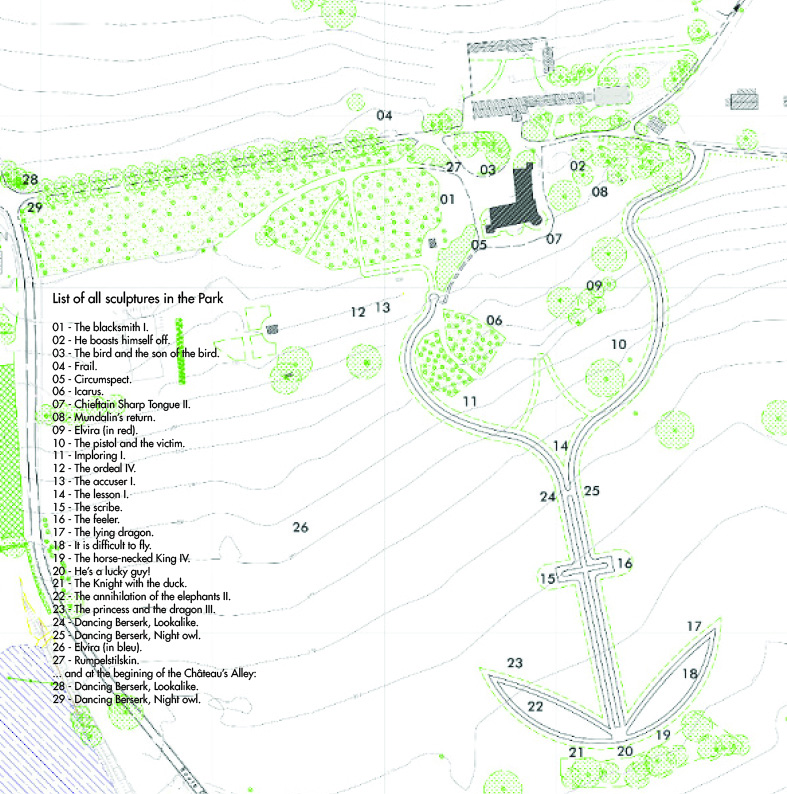
Map of the park

List of sculptures in the park with catalogue reference, original work and its date, date of arrival each sculpture in Fougis, dimensions (height, width, thickness & weight) and finishing

List of works in the sculpture park
| # | Catal. | Name | O | Date | FR | H | W | T | Weight | Finishing |
|---|---|---|---|---|---|---|---|---|---|---|
| 1 | 010.0320 | The Blacksmith, I | D | 1985 | 2002 | 10.0 | 9.2 | 0.33 | 112.00 | raw steel |
| 2 | 011.0321 | He Puffs up his Chest | D | 1992 | 2002 | 7.0 | 3.2 | 0.25 | 13.75 | raw steel |
| 3 | 012.0322 | The Bird and the Son of the Bird | D S | 1973 | 2003 | 6.3 | 4.2 x 3.7 | 0.055 | 12.00 | polychrome |
| 4 | 013.0323 | Falling over | D | 1986 | 2004 | 7.0 | 5.5 | 0.23 | 27.26 | black |
| 5 | 014.0324 | The Circumspect | D | 1992 | 2004 | 12.0 | 3.8 | 0.35 | 45.90 | white |
| 6 | 015.0325 | Icarus | D | 1992 | 2004 | 9.0 | 9.9 | 0.30 | 61.45 | white |
| 7 | 016.0326 | Chieftain Sharp Tongue, II | D | 1990 | 2004 | 7.0 | 5.4 | 0.23 | 29.52 | white |
| 8 | 017.0327 | Mundalin's Return | D | 1990 | 2005 | 9.0 | 6.4 | 0.30 | 56.64 | white |
| 9 | 018.0328 | Elvira (red) | P | 1961 | 2006 | 7.8 | 1.7 | 0.23 | 15.57 | polychrome |
| 10 | 019.0329 | The Pistol and the Victim | W | 1964 | 2005 | 5.3 | 7.0 x 3.3 | 0.055 | 9.73 | polychrome |
| 11 | 020.0330 | The Invoker, I | D | 1989 | 2005 | 7.0 | 4.2 | 0.23 | 24.16 | white |
| 12 | 021.0331 | The Ordeal, IV | D | 1990 | 2006 | 7.0 | 6.4 | 0.23 | 31.12 | white |
| 13 | 022.0332 | The Accuser, I | D | 1986 | 2006 | 5.0 | 2.8 | 0.16 | 6.32 | white |
| 14 | 023.0333 | The Lesson, I | D | 1985 | 2006 | 8.0 | 5.4 | 0.26 | 37.32 | black |
| 15 | 024.0334 | The Scribe | D | 1986 | 2006 | 7.1 | 2.5 | 0.23 | 9.18 | white |
| 16 | 025.0335 | The Gesticulator | D | 1992 | 2006 | 7.8 | 5.6 | 0.24 | 15.38 | white |
| 17 | 026.0336 | The Lying Dragon | P | 1963 | 2006 | 2.9 | 9.1 | 0.28 | 23.99 | polychrome |
| 18 | 027.0337 | Flying is difficult ! | D | 1992 | 2006 | 7.5 | 5.4 | 0.23 | 12.98 | black |
| 19 | 028.0338 | The Horse-Necked King, IV | D | 1989 | 2006 | 7.0 | 4.9 | 0.23 | 27.73 | blue |
| 20 | 029.0339 | What a Lucky Swine ! | D | 1992 | 2006 | 7.5 | 4.0 | 0.23 | 21.84 | yellow |
| 21 | 030.0340 | The Knight with the Duck | D | 1992 | 2009 | 7.0 | 4.7 | 0.23 | 25.64 | blue |
| 22 | 031.0341 | The Annihilation of the Elephant, II | D | 1990 | 2009 | 7.0 | 5.0 | 0.23 | 28.11 | black |
| 23 | 032.0342 | The Princess and the Dragon, III | D | 1991 | 2007 | 11.6 | 9.9 | 0.32 | 92.40 | beige |
| 24 | 034.0344 | Dancing Berserker, The Doppelgänger | D | 1984 | 2007 | 7.6 | 5.2 | 0.23 | 28.11 | raw steel |
| 25 | 033.0343 | Dancing Berserker, The Night Walker, II | D | 1984 | 2007 | 7.5 | 5.9 | 0.23 | 27.98 | raw steel |
| 26 | 035.0345 | Elvira (blue) | P | 1961 | 2009 | 11.0 | 2.3 | 0.30 | 40.36 | polychrome |
| 27 | 036.0346 | Rumpelstilskin | D | 1986 | 2011 | 2.2 | 0.97 | 0.07 | 0.42 | black |
| 28 | 004.0314 | Dancing Berserker, The Doppelgänger | D | 1984 | 2006 | 4.5 | 3.1 | 0.14 | 6.41 | raw steel |
| 29 | 003.0313 | Dancing Berserker, The Night Walker | D | 1984 | 2006 | 4.4 | 3.5 | 0.14 | 6.41 | raw steel |

- Units for dimensions: Height, Width (sculpture) and Thickness (steel platte) are in meters, the Weight (including plinth) in metric tonnes
- All sculptures were cut from massive steel plates.
- The 7 digits reference in the present inventory for the catalogue : the first group with 3 digits report to the numbering within a type of works, the second group with 4 digits to the global work by the artist.
- Column "O" (for "Originalwerk", Original Work): D - Drawing (25); P - Painting (3); S - Steel Sculpture (based on a previous wooden sculpture) (1); W - Wooden Sculpture (1).
- Column "Date" indicates the year of the Original Work as drawing, painting or sculpture.
- Column "FR" indicates the year of arrival in Fougis. Sculptures #28 & #29 were produced in 1984 and stood previously in Melle and Hamburg, before arriving 2006 in Fougis.
