= Lakenenland =

Sculpture park in Chocolay Township, Michigan

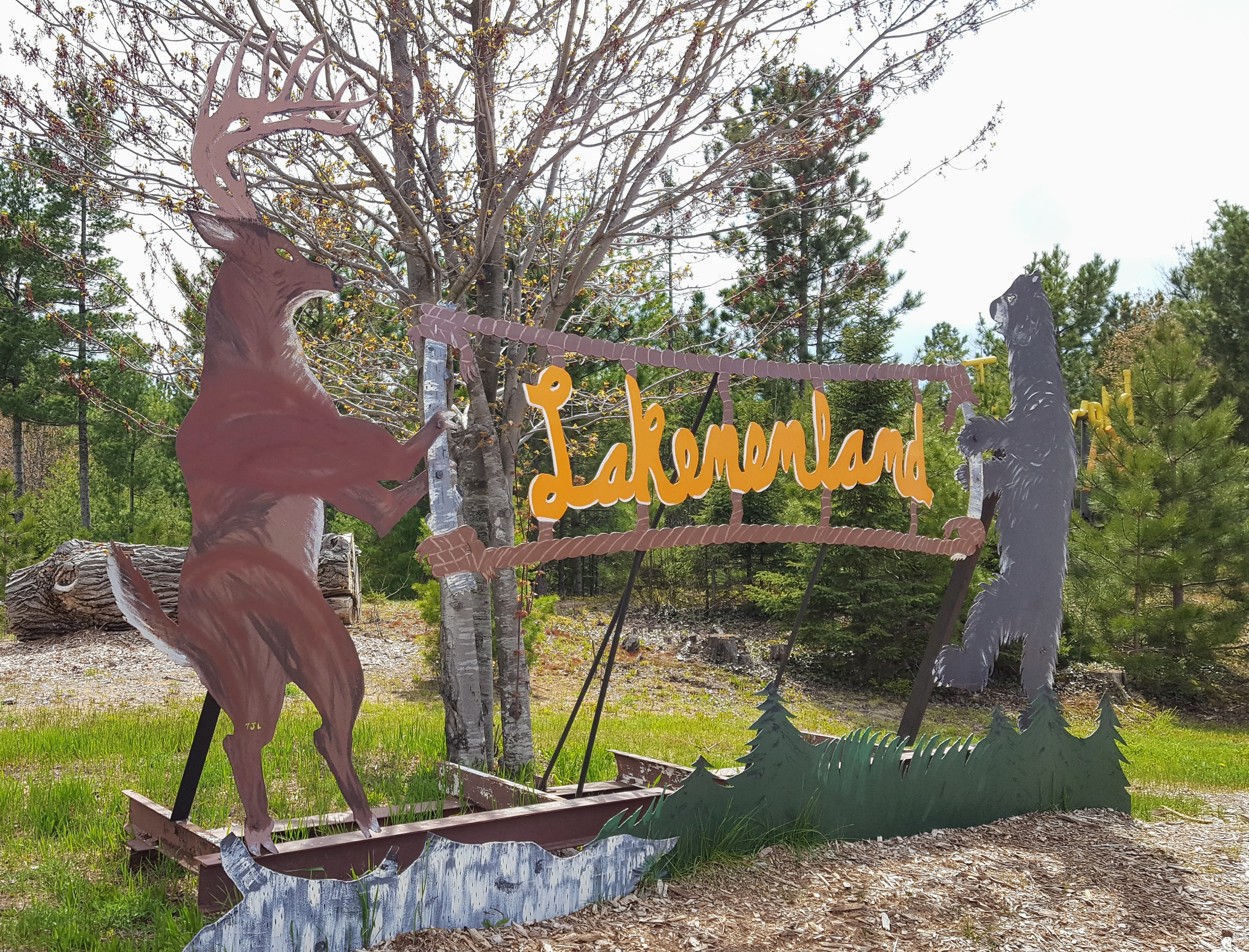
- Sign welcoming visitors to Lakenenland.

- Location within Michigan
- Type: sculpture park
- Location: 2800 M-28, Marquette, MI 49855
- Coordinates: 46.4924922°N 87.1523165°W
- Area: 37-acre (15 ha)
- Website: https://lakenenland.com/

Lakenenland is a sculpture park located in Chocolay Township, Michigan. The park was founded in 2003, when artist Tom Lakenen moved his collection of scrap iron sculptures from his yard to a plot of land near the Lake Superior coast. Lakenenland contains more than 80 sculptures in the creator's "junkyard art" style.

== Description ==
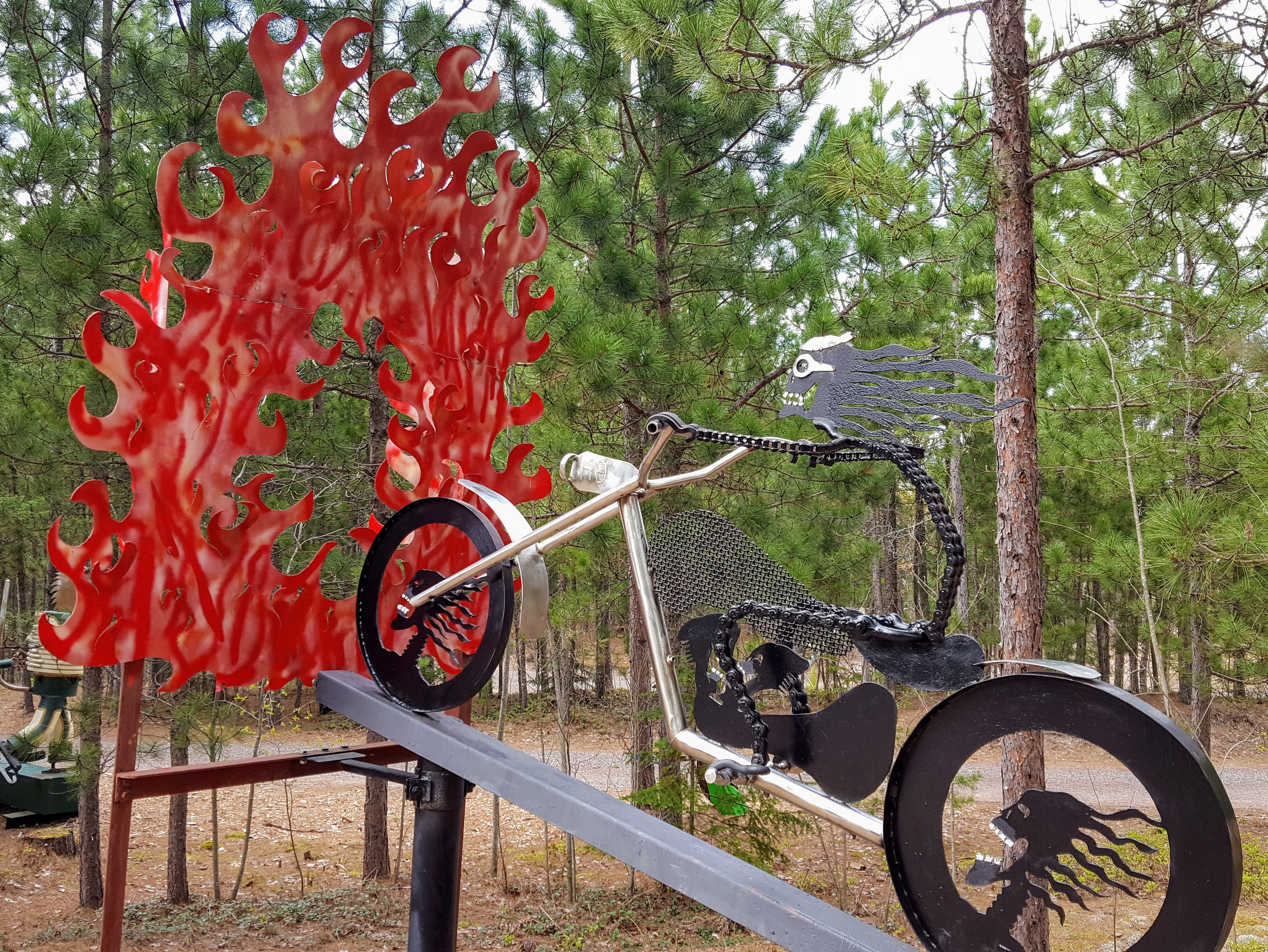
A skeleton rides a motorcycle through a ring of fire (2017)

Lakenenland consists of 37 acres (15 ha) of land located on State Highway M-28, 15 miles (24 km) east of Marquette. The park is located on a snowmobile trail and contains a lean-to where snowmobilers or cross-country skiers can warm up in winter months. Sculptures are located along a trail which is accessible by walking year-round and driving when road conditions allow. The park includes a pond stocked with fish, and an annual kids fishing derby is held each June. A band shell also provides a venue for live music, and a music festival is held each summer.

More than 80 iron sculptures are located in the park and new works are added regularly. Some sculptures are lighthearted, while others provide commentary on political topics, such as a pig representing corporate greed. Others pay tribute to the history and culture of Michigan's Upper Peninsula.

== History ==
Construction worker Tom Lakenen began sculpting figures from scrap metal to fill his time between construction jobs after giving up drinking alcohol. He welded in his garage and installed the sculptures in his front yard, but Chocolay Township officials told him they were considered signs and not permitted to be displayed in his front yard. Lakenen bought land near the Lake Superior shore in 2003 and created Lakenenland to showcase his artwork. Regulatory conflicts between Lakenen and members of the township board presented challenges when the park was first opened, but the community has embraced Lakenen's park; in 2011 he was named township citizen of the year by the local business community.

== See also ==
- Sculpture trails
- List of sculpture parks
