= Pyramid Hill Sculpture Park and Museum =

Sculpture garden and museum in Hamilton, Ohio, United States

Coordinates: 39.3652°N 84.5777°W

Pyramid Hill Sculpture Park and Museum is a non-profit park located in Hamilton, Ohio. The park includes an outdoor sculpture collection, a 'pioneer house' built in the 1820s, an Ancient Sculpture Museum, and a Museum Gallery for contemporary exhibitions. The Ancient Sculpture Museum includes pieces from ancient Greek, Roman, Etruscan and Egyptian civilizations. Opened in 2017, the design of the Ancient Sculpture Museum was inspired by houses from ancient Rome. The Gallery Museum, which opened in 2016, features a continuous rotation of exhibitions by contemporary artists. Visitors can get information about the art pieces through the app Otocast, some of them from the artists themselves.

== History ==
Harry T. Wilks (1925–2014) purchased the land and built the Pyramid House as a private home in 1987. In the following years, Wilks acquired large sculptures and additional adjacent properties and started landscaping the park; this includes the park's infrastructure, roads, small lakes, and trails. When it opened in 1996, André Emmerich, writing for The Atlantic, considered it "the most beautiful natural setting of any art park in the country". In 1997, Wilks established the non-profit organization that runs the park. In addition to its permanent collection, the park also hosts a constant rotation of exhibitions from contemporary artists around the globe.

A nationwide search for a new Executive Director was conducted by the board of trustees in 2018, and in 2019, they appointed Sean FitzGibbons. FitzGibbons has worked on the design and fabrication of public art installations in San Antonio, Seattle, Knoxville, and Houston. FitzGibbons graduated from the University of Texas and Washington University in St. Louis, where he earned a master's of fine arts degree. Trained in sculpture and visual arts, FitzGibbons has mounted more than 20 personal exhibitions in the past decade at galleries and conferences throughout the U.S.

On Friday, October 30, 2020 a few of the Pyramid Hill Sculpture Park pieces were included in the ribbon cutting ceremony for the Cincinnati Art Museums Art Climb. The Art Climb initiative, a stairwell with several flights of steps and landings, was built to offer a new access to the museum from surrounding historic neighborhoods, while also becoming a space for temporary exhibits.

== Collection ==
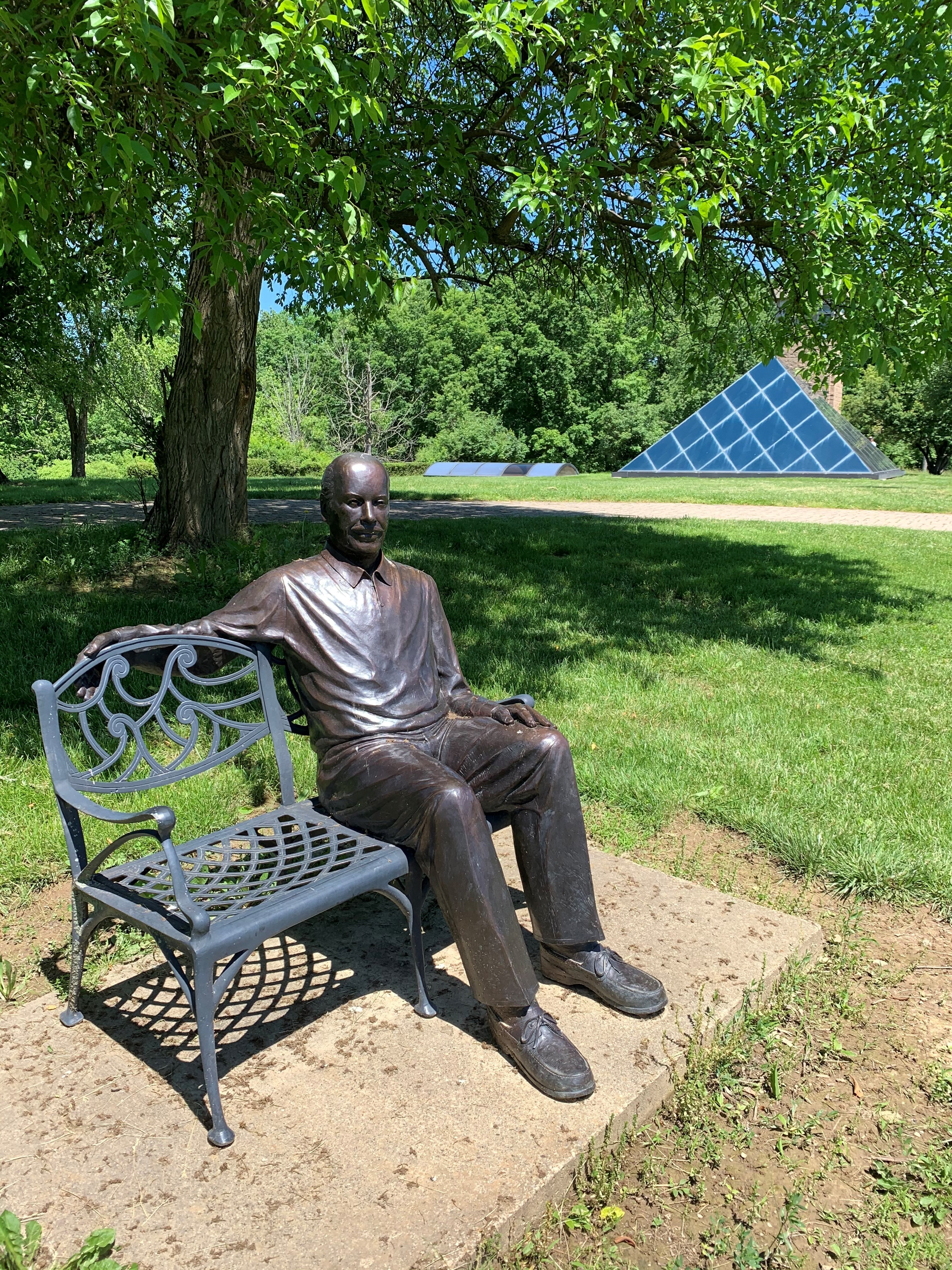
Statue of Harry Wilks, by Pyramid House

The collection includes 71 permanent art pieces, and the park also hosts exhibitions by contemporary artists. Highlights of the permanent collection include Cincinnati Story by George Sugarman, a colorful structure that once stood in downtown Cincinnati, the Age of Stone, a huge work by Jon Isherwood composed of nine pieces of massive granite ranging from 12 to 18 feet tall which has been compared to Stonehenge, and Abracadabra by Alexander Liberman, who also constructed the welded steel Laocoon and Torre II. Artist Bill Barrett also has a permanent piece in the collection.

== See also ==
- List of sculpture parks
- Sculpture garden
- Sculpture trails
