= Salem Art Works =

Salem Art Works (SAW) is a 501(c)(3) nonprofit, tax-exempt sculpture park, arts center, and artists community on the grounds of a former dairy farm in Salem, New York. SAW hosts artist residencies, workshops, and community events.

The 119.4 acres (0.483 km^{2}) of the Cary Hill Sculpture Park features work by emerging and established artists.

== History ==
The Carlos Cary Dairy Farm in Salem was purchased by artist Anthony Cafritz in 2005 and has since been transformed into Salem Art Works, a thriving artist community and cultural hub. SAW's intimate campus is surrounded by thick woods, running streams, ponds, pastures and rustic out buildings that reflect its history as an old dairy farm.

== Artists colony ==
Cafritz first envisioned an interdisciplinary arts center while attending Bennington College in the early 1980s. The concept of a communal and collaborative art space grew from an interest in Black Mountain College, an experimental college that redefined the boundaries between teacher and student. Development of Salem Art Works began in February 2005 with the clearing of the grounds and barns for the sculpture park and the construction of studio spaces for the first artists in residence. In the early stages, Salem Art Works drew together a small board of artists and neighbors. Since 2005 Salem Art Works has grown to accommodate up to 100 artists per season and host visits by over 1000 members of the public each year. The Cary Hill Sculpture Park, which is contained in 119.4 bucolic acres and open 7 days a week, features work by over 70 artists, including Mark di Suvero, Bernar Venet, Peter Lundberg, Serbian born Zoran Mojsilov and Nora Simon.

Salem Art Works is built as a communal space with residents sharing accommodation and domestic duties. The idea that all of the arts share common moments of inspiration and expression is central to Salem Art Works' philosophy. "You get a group of people together and the possibility of invention comes. That's the ethos of this place", said Cafritz in 2005.

== Campus ==
Located at 19 Cary Lane, in Salem, New York, Salem Art Works houses studios and facilities for many mediums. With a full wood shop, a welding bay outfitted for MIG, TIG, and arc welding, as well as a fully operational glass blowing shop, blacksmithing forge, and 2 Anagama wood fired kilns, both resident and self-funded artists are provided with the resources necessary to further their work and artistic vision. With galleries in both the original Cary farm house as well as numerous refurbished barns on campus, Salem Art Works offers varied spaces and architecture in which to exhibit.

== Annual events ==
- Salem Arts Music Festival "For the eclectic music lover", SAWFest is an annual music festival featuring musicians and food vendors from around the region. 2013 will bring 4 northeastern bands to the SAWFest stage on 20 July, from 5 pm - 11 pm.
- Harvest Festival Organized by the Salem Area Chamber of Commerce, this festival features the produce and crafts of SAW's local community.
- Intercollegiate Iron Pour This gathering of college students brings together young artists from across the northeast to pour iron in a collaborative environment.

== Semi-annual events ==
- salem2salem, an interdisciplinary and intercultural artists exchange, was created in 2010. Each year a new group of thirty artists are alternately hosted in either Salem, New York, or Salem, Germany.
