= North High Bridge Park =

Park in Saint Paul, Minnesota, US

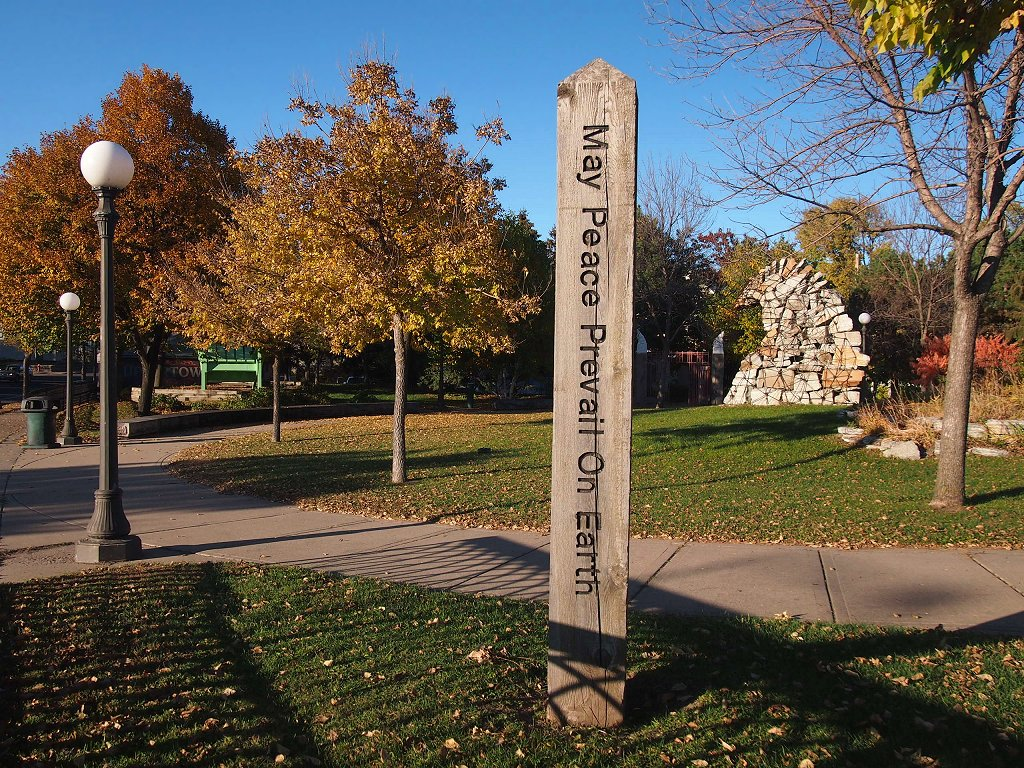
- North High Bridge Park in autumn
- Interactive map of North High Bridge Park
- Type: Sculpture park
- Location: Saint Paul, Minnesota, United States
- Coordinates: 44°56′14″N 93°6′31″W
- Area: 0.85 acres (0.34 ha)
- Created: 1987
- Operator: Saint Paul Parks and Recreation

North High Bridge Park is a 0.85-acre (0.34 ha) city park located on the east bank bluffs above the Mississippi River in Saint Paul, Minnesota, United States. The park is adjacent to the High Bridge and was created when the new High Bridge was completed in 1987. The park features gardens, sculptures, and an overlook of the Mississippi River.

== Sculptures ==
- Czech and Slovak Memorial Gates - A sculpture of salvaged rock and metal by artist Craig David, dedicated in 2004. The gates themselves were salvaged baptismal gates from St. Stanislaus Kostka Catholic Church and the granite curb stones and pavers came from the Saint Paul Department of Public Works.
- Green Chair - Originally installed in North High Bridge Park in 1995 by Joel Sisson, it was recreated in 2002 with treated materials that would withstand the weather. The original was part of the Green Chair Project and was on display at the Walker Art Center in Minneapolis.
- Peace Pole - A peace pole with the words, "May peace prevail on the earth" in four languages (English, Spanish, Hmong, and Czech) was installed in 1997 by a Girl Scout troop.
- The Watcher - Created by Zoran Mojsilov in 1995 using leftover rock that had been used to create garden walls in the park.
