= Victor's Way =

Meditation garden in County Wicklow, Ireland

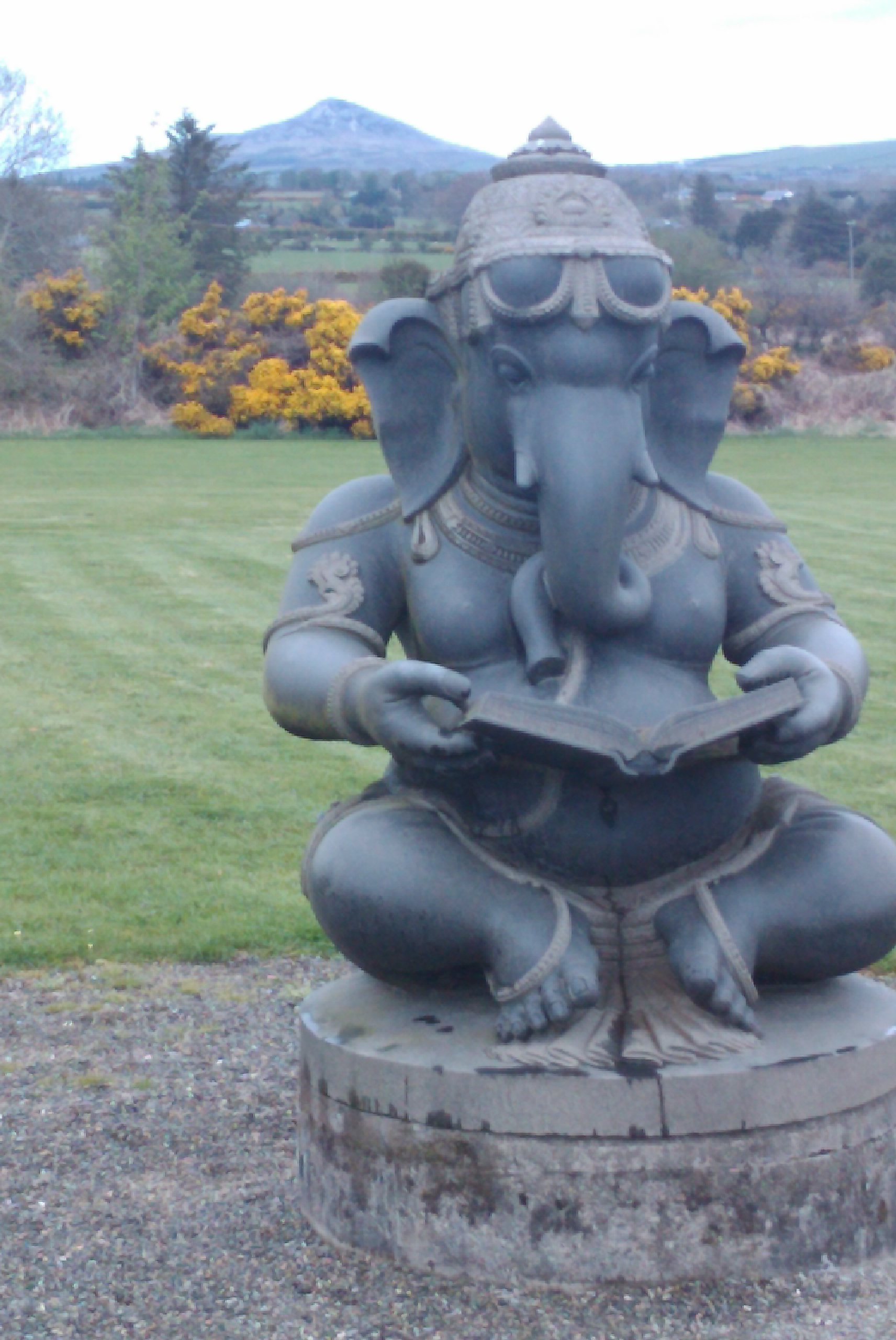
- Ganesha statue in Victor's Way, with Sugar Loaf mountain in background.
- Interactive map of Victor's Way
- Type: Sculpture and philosophy park
- Location: near Roundwood, County Wicklow, Ireland
- Coordinates: 53.0857°N 6.2197°W
- Area: 9 hectares (22 acres)
- Owner: Victor Langheld
- Status: Closed
- Collections: Statues
- Website: www.victorsway.eu

Victor's Way (previously Victoria's Way), located near Roundwood, County Wicklow, Ireland, is a privately owned meditation garden which contains black granite sculptures. The 22-acre (9 ha) property contains over 30 sculptures. As of 2025, the property was "closed [..] permanently" and not open to visitors.

== The park ==
The park, which has been known both as Victor's Way and Victoria's Way, closed in 2015, with the owner stating that "Too many day-trippers turned it into a fun park for parents with children. It was designed as a contemplative garden for over 28s".

As of 2004 it was owned and maintained by Victor Langheld. Born in Berlin, he travelled in India,

As of 2025, the Victor's Way website indicated that the park was no longer open to visitors and had been permanently closed.
