= Thionne =

- Commune
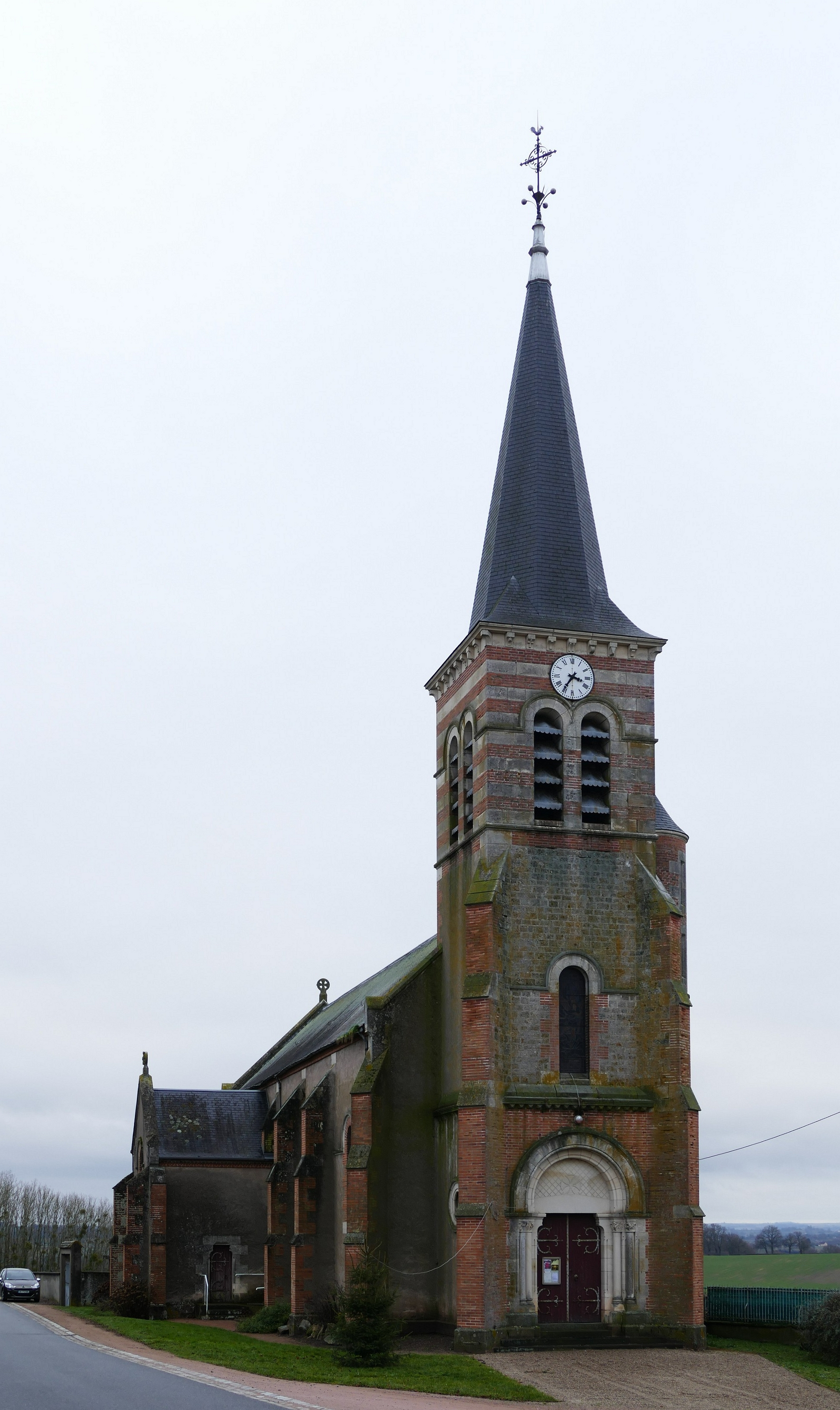
- The church in Thionne
- Location of Thionne
- Location within France Location within Auvergne-Rhône-Alpes
- Coordinates: 46°24′21″N 3°34′36″E
- Country: France
- Region: Auvergne-Rhône-Alpes
- Department: Allier
- Arrondissement: Vichy
- Canton: Moulins-2
- Intercommunality: Entr'Allier Besbre et Loire

Government
  - Mayor (2026–32): Jean-Louis Guinatier
- Area^{1}: 26.96 km^{2} (10.41 sq mi)
- Elevation: 260 m (850 ft)
- Highest elevation: 305 m (1,001 ft)
- Lowest elevation: 237 m (778 ft)
- Population (2023): 291
  - Density: 10.8/km^{2} (28.0/sq mi)
- Time zone: UTC+01:00 (CET)
  - Summer (DST): UTC+02:00 (CEST)
- INSEE/Postal code: 03284 /03220
- ^{1} French Land Register data, which excludes lakes, ponds, glaciers > 1 km^{2} (0.386 sq mi or 247 acres) and river estuaries.

Thionne (French pronunciation: [tjɔn]) is a commune in the Allier department in Auvergne-Rhône-Alpes in central France.

== Population ==
Historical population
Year	Pop.	±% p.a.
1968	489	—
1975	427	−1.92%
1982	374	−1.88%
1990	337	−1.29%
1999	306	−1.07%
2007	315	+0.36%
2012	324	+0.57%
2017	313	−0.69%
2023	291	−1.21%
Source: INSEE

== See also ==
- Communes of the Allier department
