= Donald M. Kendall Sculpture Gardens =

Coordinates: 41.03422°N 73.690765°W

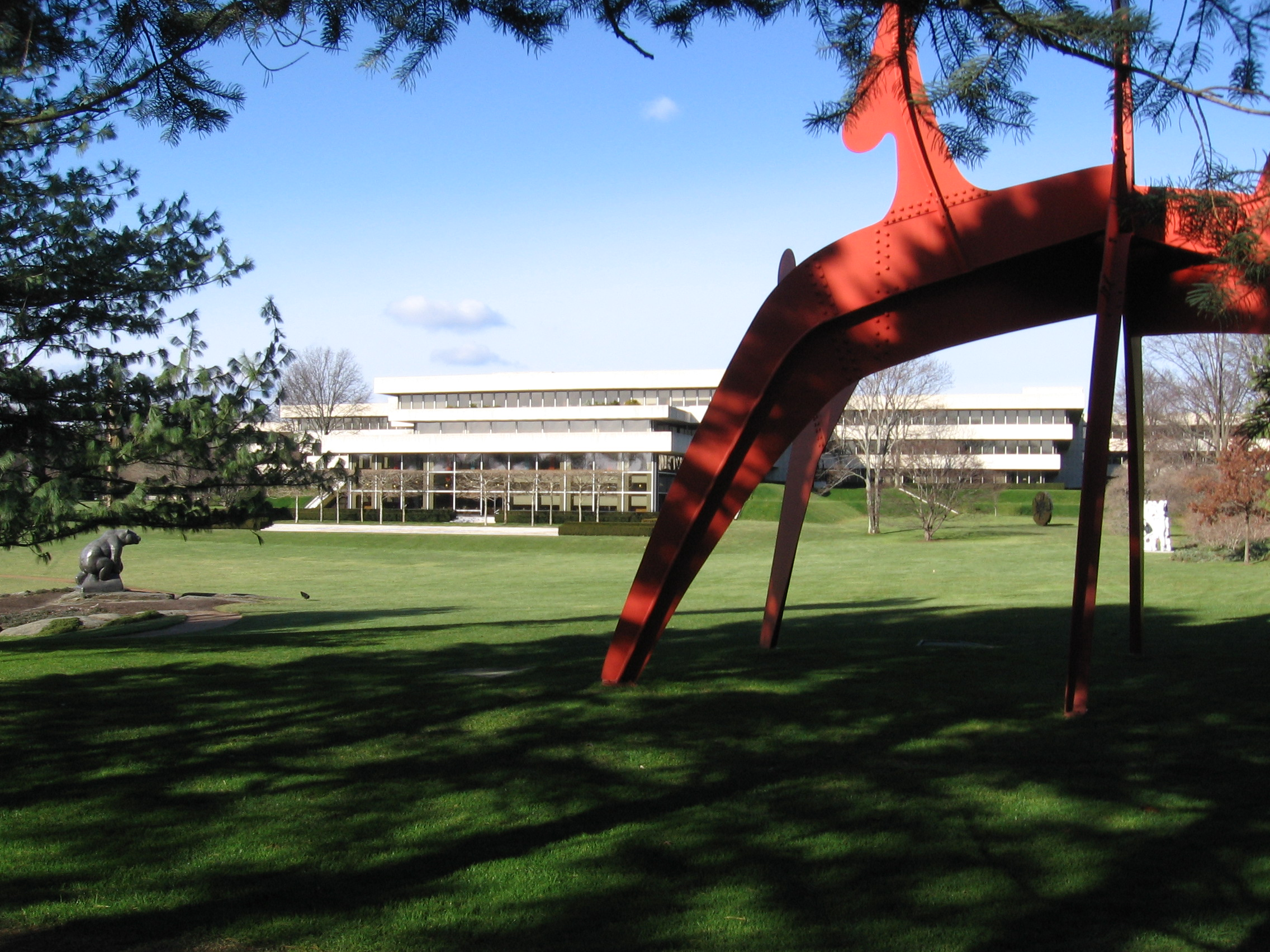
South end of the gardens looking north at PepsiCo world headquarters, past the expanse of the south lawn. Shown are part of Alexander Calder's red "Hats Off" and, in the distance, David Wynne's "Grizzly Bear" (at left). Two other works can be seen in the distance.

The Donald M. Kendall Sculpture Gardens is a collection of 45 pieces of outdoor sculpture at the PepsiCo world headquarters in Purchase, New York. The collection includes work from major modern sculptors including Auguste Rodin, Henry Moore, and Alexander Calder.

The collection, which also features works by Henri Laurens, Arnaldo Pomodoro, Richard Erdman, Jean Dubuffet, Robert Davidson, and Claes Oldenburg, focuses on major 20th-century art. The sculpture "gardens" mostly consist of park-like landscaping, including lawns, trees, ponds, and fountains, as well as landscaped gardens with a topiary, tended hedges, flower beds and water-lily ponds.

The sculpture collection is meant to "exist in harmony on approximately 168 acres (0.68 km^{2}) of carefully tended landscape", according to a PepsiCo pamphlet about the gardens, and expansion of the collection occurred after the headquarters had been built and the gardens had begun to take shape. The gardens themselves were, in turn, designed with regard to the sculpture in the collection, and all were meant by the former PepsiCo chairman and founder of the gardens, Donald M. Kendall, to help create an atmosphere of "stability, creativity and experimentation that would reflect his vision of the company", according to the pamphlet. Kendall continued to be involved with the collection and the gardens after he stepped down as leader of the company.

== Description of the site ==
The site, built partly on a former polo field, with the enormous, three-story headquarters building in the center, surrounded by bushes, vast lawns, streams on the east and west, gardens and bushes dispersed around the site, and a pond in the back. Parking (with separate lots for employees and visitors) is hidden behind trees, mostly on the east side. From above, the headquarters building is shaped like seven squares, connected by their corners and forming a cross with an inner cross-shaped courtyard, open at the north side (the front of the building, facing Anderson Hill Road).

The building's square blocks rise from the ground "into low inverted ziggurats", according to the pamphlet, with each of the three floors having strips of dark windows topped by strips of tan-white concrete or stone. At the entrance, a long, straight drive leads up to the building. Where the courtyard meets the driveway, the PepsiCo corporate flag flies together with the flag of the United States. A strip of lawn and rows of trees extend down the open, north arm of the cross-like courtyard, ending in the center, where a large fountain with David Wynne's "Girl with a Dolphin" is surrounded by a wide paved area. The three closed arms each have sunken gardens with trees, bushes and, in the middle arm, a small pond, together with sculptures, none of which are monumental. Surrounding the building, and seen in distant vistas, are monumental sculptures and nearby gardens with small ponds.

The vast south lawn allows the viewer to take in the full size of the structure, and the lower ground enhances the height of the building, an effect lessened on the north (entrance) side by trees and a more level approach.

== Visitor access and nearby art ==
The sculpture garden is open to the public, and a visitor's booth is in operation during the spring and summer. When the center is closed, visitors may get a map of the gardens from a security guard at the headquarters entrance. No admission is charged for entrance, and parking is free. As of July 2025, the sculpture garden is open on weekends from March 30 to November 16, 10 a.m. to 4 p.m., and for selected holidays such as Memorial Day, July 4, Labor Day, and Indigenous People's Day. Visitors can take Metro-North commuter trains to White Plains or Rye, and then take a taxi to the headquarters. The No. 12 bus from the White Plains railroad station stops at the headquarters.

The PepsiCo World Headquarters is a seven-building complex designed by Edward Durrell Stone. Across the street (Anderson Hill Road) from the headquarters, more modern art can be seen at the Neuberger Museum of Art on the campus of Purchase College of the State University of New York.

== List of works in the sculpture gardens ==
The sculpture gardens have 45 works:

- Judith Brown, "Caryatids"
- Alexander Calder, "Hats Off" (Calder sited the piece in the park)
- William Crovello, "Katana"
- Robert Davidson:
  - "Frog"
  - "Totems"
- Jean Dubuffet, "Kiosque l'evide"
- Richard Erdman, "Passage"
- Max Ernst, "Capricorn"
- Alberto Giacometti:
  - "Large Standing Woman II"
  - "Large Standing Woman III"
- Gideon Graetz, "Composition in Stainless Steel No. 1"
- Barbara Hepworth:
  - "Meridian"
  - "The Family of Man"
- Henri Laurens
  - "Le Matin"
  - "Les Ondines"
- Jacques Lipchitz, "Towards a New World"
- Seymour Lipton:
  - "The Codex"
  - "The Wheel"
- Aristide Maillol, "Marie"
- Marino Marini, "Horse and Rider"
- Joan Miró, "Personnage"
- Henry Moore:
  - "Double Oval"
  - "Locking Piece"
  - "Reclining Figure"
  - "Sheep Piece"
- Louise Nevelson, "Celebration II"
- Isamu Noguchi, "Energy Void"
- Claes Oldenburg, "Giant Trowel II"
- Arnaldo Pomodoro
  - "Grande Disco"
  - "Triad"
- Art Price, "Birds of Welcome"
- Bret Price, "Big Scoop"
- George Rickey, "Double L Excentric Gyratory II"
- Auguste Rodin, "Eve"
- Victor Salmones, "The Search"
- George Segal, "Three People on Four Benches" (Seagal "likes the fact that people routinely plant big red lipstick kisses on the piece", a conservator at the garden said in 1991.)
- Asmundur Sveinsson, "Through the Sound Barrier"
- David Smith, "Cube Totem Seven and Six"
- Tony Smith, "Duck"
- Kenneth Snelson, "Mozart I"
- Wendy Taylor, "Jester"
- David Wynne:
  - "Dancer with a Bird"
  - "Girl on a Horse"
  - "Grizzly Bear"
  - "The Dancers"
  - "Girl with a Dolphin"

== History ==
The sculpture garden was created at the direction of Donald M. Kendall, who was chief executive officer of PepsiCo when the company moved in 1970 from Manhattan to the 168-acre (0.68 km^{2}) site in suburban Purchase. Kendall "sought to create an atmosphere of stability, creativity and experimentation. He envisioned as essential to that ambience a museum without walls, where works of art could be enjoyed by the employees, the community and the public," according to an article in The New York Times. Kendall himself selected the sculptures. When the new site was officially dedicated on October 2, 1970, Kendall said he wanted to create "one of the greatest modern sculpture exhibits in the world". At the time, Kendall said he wanted the gardens to have works by "all of the major sculptors of the modern period."

The original landscape design was created in the late 1960s just before PepsiCo moved to the property, by E. D. Stone Jr., son of Edward Durell Stone, the architect of the headquarters. The younger Stone had about 6,000 trees from 38 species plus thousands of flowering bulbs planted. Originally, only eight pieces of artwork were in the sculpture garden. Employees liked the idea so much that Kendall decided to enlarge the collection. As late as 1991, after Kendall had stepped down as CEO, he was still overseeing the collection.

From 1981 to 1985, landscape designer Russell Page redesigned the gardens to harmonize them with the sculptures. He added intimate gardens and walks. Since 1985, a third landscape designer, Francois Goffinet, has been in charge of garden development.

The sculpture garden was closed for renovations from 2012 through 2017.

== Maintenance ==
In 1991, The New York Times published a feature article on maintenance of the garden. An employee monitors the sculptures with weekly inspections, driving around in a golf cart "outfitted with brooms, brushes, a ladder, calipers, thermometers and a can of Pepsi." Nature and pollution can threaten the artwork. In the spring, birds like to nest in a work by Nevelson, chipmunks prefer the mysterious inner spaces of Judith Brown's "Caryatid", a welded steel sculpture made of automobile parts. At one point, carpenter bees started chewing into Robert Davidson's "Totems," a 45-foot (14 m) Western red cedar sculpture. Removing bird guano is a constant task. The huge model statue of a bear was a favorite target for some.

The piece "Grizzly Bear" by David Wynne faces harm even from the temperature. "When the sun hits that black rock during the day the temperature can go up to 120 degrees on the surface, and drop to 40 degrees at night," according to Douglass Kwart, a freelance objects conservator who was overseeing the conservation program at PepsiCo as of 1991. "That change puts the stones through tremendous stress, because of contraction. Water is absorbed into the stone and driven out, absorbed and driven out again."

As of 1991, maintenance staff at the garden wrote up a weekly report on each piece of sculpture after observing each for damage.
