= Richard Erdman (artist) =

American artist

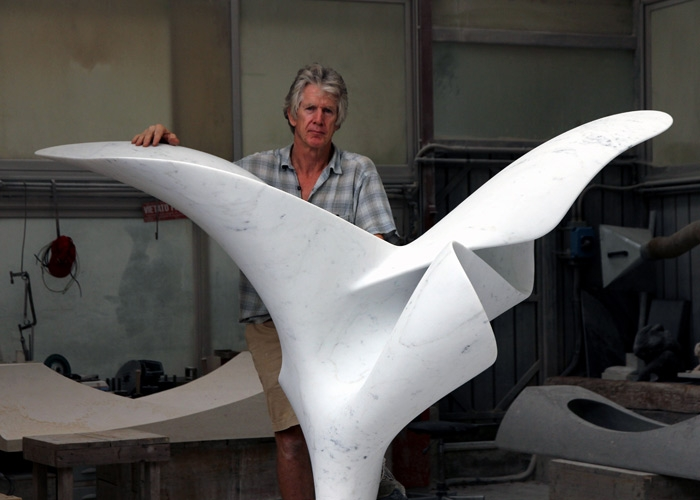
- Richard Erdman with his marble sculpture, Volante.
- Born: Richard Stewart Erdman; May 20, 1952 (age 74); Princeton, New Jersey, United States
- Known for: sculpture, painting
- Movement: Abstract Bronze and Marble Sculpture, Modernism
- Spouse: Madeleine Dammers Austin
- Patrons: Donald M. Kendall

Richard Erdman (born May 20, 1952) is an American artist living and working in Williston, Vermont, and Carrara, Italy. Primarily working in marble and bronze abstract sculpture, Erdman's prolific body of work ranges from intimately sized maquettes to the largest sculpture ever carved from a single block of travertine (Passage, in the collection of the Donald M. Kendall Sculpture Gardens). His works belong to collections in 52 countries across 6 continents, including the United Nations, Museum of Fine Arts, Boston, Princeton University, the Rockefeller Collection, and many others. Erdman specializes in collaborating with esteemed architectural firms for custom commissions, and has partnered with Antonio Citterio, Richard Meier & Partners, Enzo Enea, and Whipple Russell, among others.

Erdman's family moved to Dorset, Vermont, when he was a child, where he grew up at the foothills of the oldest marble quarries in the U.S. These early experiences with stone and nature greatly influenced his life and work. In his youth, Erdman was a two-time NCAA All-American skier at the University of Vermont. Erdman is the grandson of Charles R. Erdman Jr., former mayor of Princeton.

== Education ==
- Burr and Burton Academy, 1971.
- University of Vermont, 1975.
- Honorary Doctorate of Letters, University of Vermont, 2016.

== Career ==
Richard Erdman has travelled to the marble quarries of Carrara, Italy, since 1975. His sculpture is frequently made from the region's white and grey marbles, which have been used since the time of Ancient Rome as the source material for a long lineage of artists, including Michelangelo. His sculptures merge the ancient tradition of marble stone-carving with contemporary modernist sculpture, and have been shown in more than 160 solo and group exhibitions throughout North America, Europe, and Asia. He has executed over 120 commissioned works for museums, public, and corporate collections. His work is held in collections in 52 countries worldwide.

In 1985 PepsiCo commissioned Erdman to create the monumental sculpture Passage, which stands like a sentinel at the entrance to the Donald M. Kendall Sculpture Gardens at PepsiCo. Carved from a massive 450 ton block of travertine, the 25-by-16 foot Passage is the largest sculpture in the world carved from a single block of travertine. More recently, in 2017, Richard Erdman completed the monumental Bardiglio marble sculpture Arete, for Richard Meier & Partners' Timeless 55 Tower located in Taipei, Taiwan. Arete stands nearly 12 feet high.

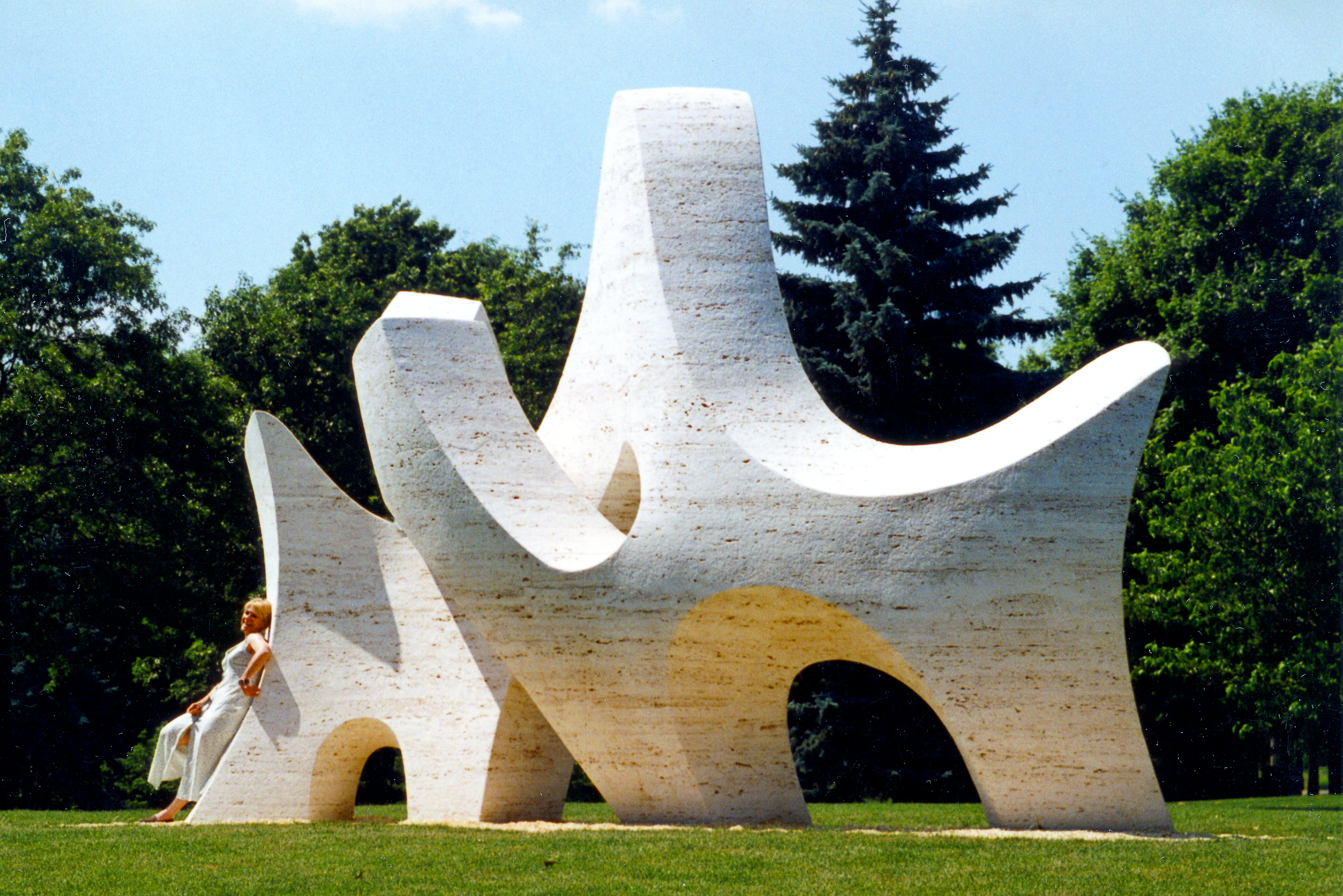
Passage, 1985, Donald M. Kendall Sculpture Park, Purchase, NY.

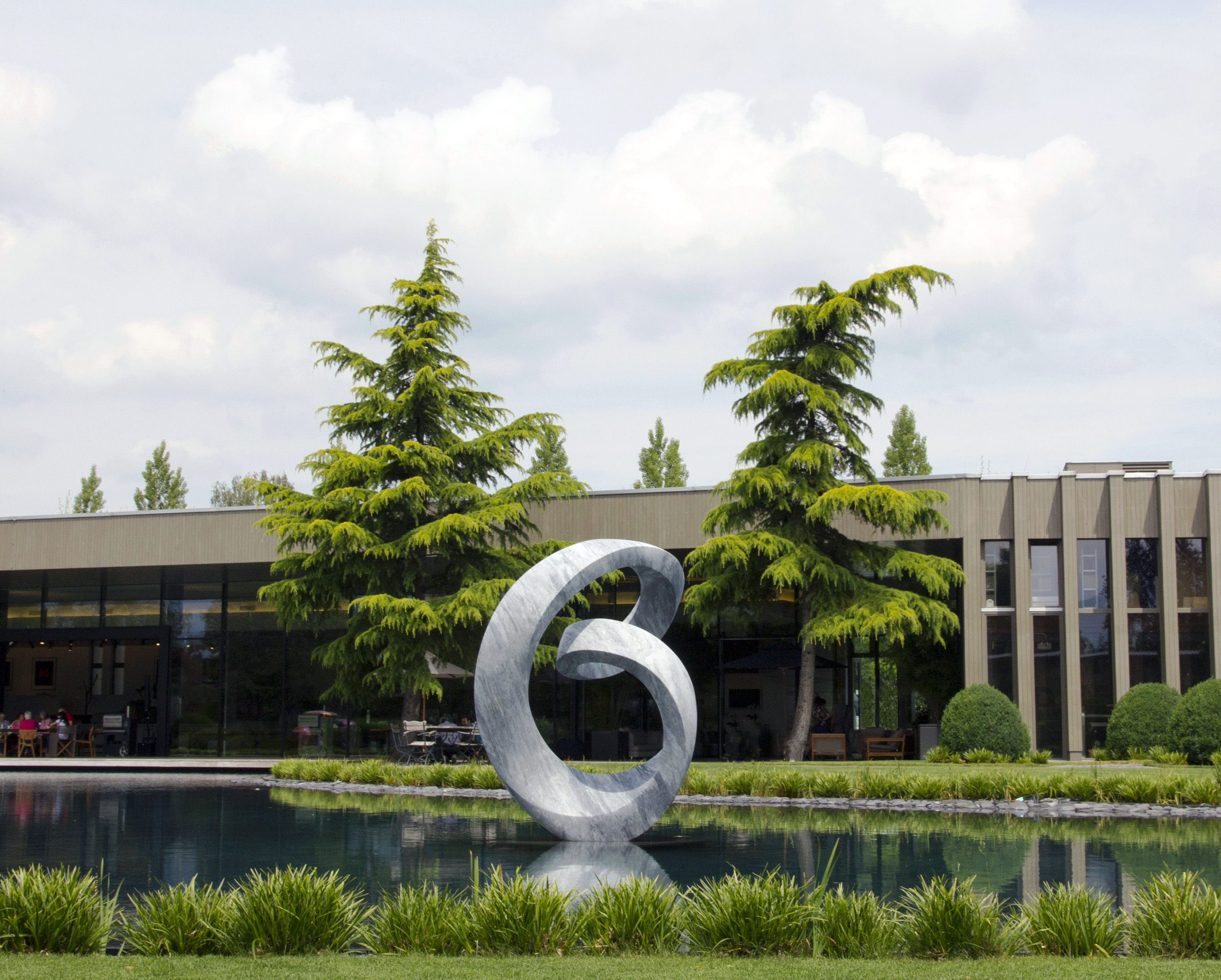
Spira, 2014, Enzo Enea Tree Museum, Rapperswil-Jona, Switzerland.

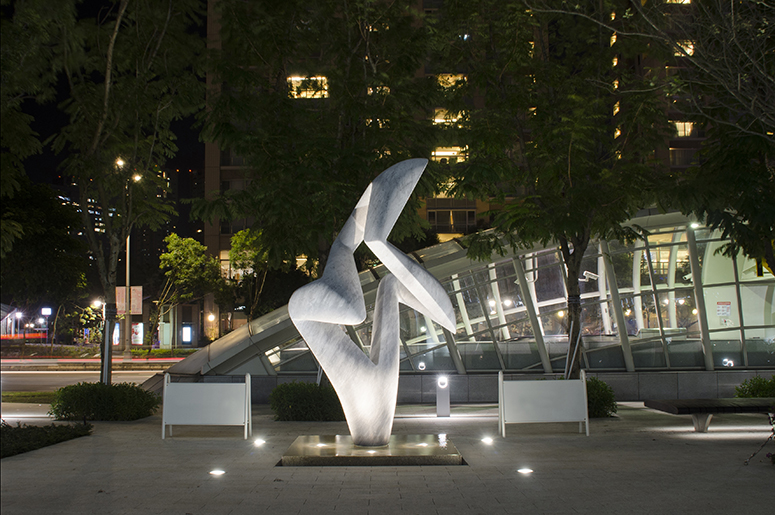
Arete CDC, 2016, Timeless Tower, Taipei, Taiwan.

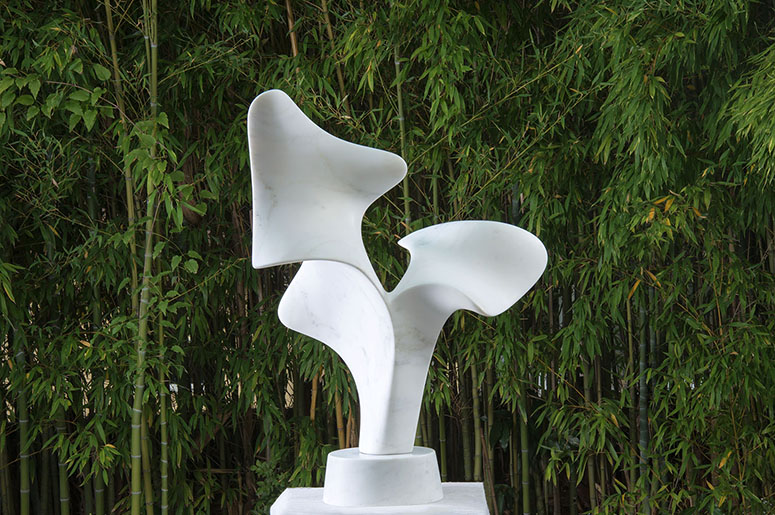
Fiora Bianca, 2016.

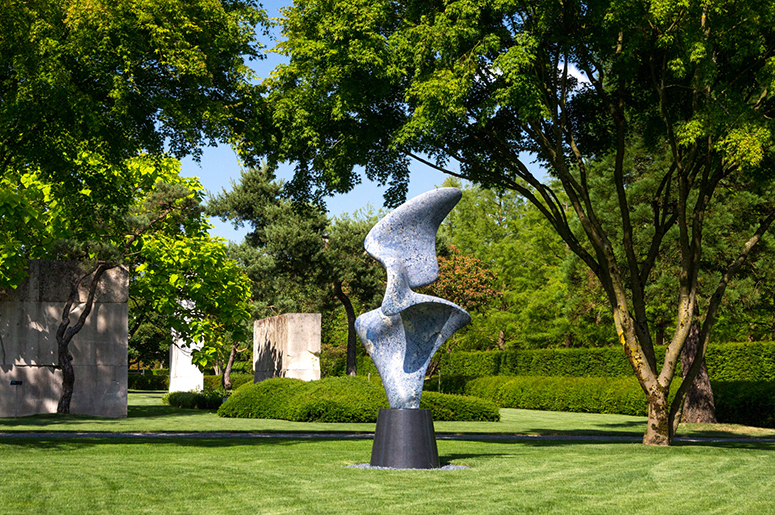
Sentinel, 2013, Rapperswil-Jona, Switzerland.

== Gallery Representation ==
- 375 Gallery, Palm Beach, FL
- Enea Tree Museum, Rapperswil- Jona, Switzerland
- Galerie d' Orsay, Boston, MA
- Galerie Artziwna, Vienna, Austria
- Landau Contemporary at Galerie Dominion, Montreal, QC, Canada
- Landau Fine Art, Meggen, Switzerland
- Melissa Morgan Fine Art, Palm Desert, CA
- Sculpturesite Gallery, Glen Ellen, CA
- Westbranch Gallery and Sculpture Park, Stowe, VT

== Major collections ==
- Aldrich Museum of Contemporary Art, Ridgefield, CT
- Allentown Art Museum, Allentown, PA
- Carpathian Foundation, Kosice, Slovakia
- Charles Stewart Mott Foundation, Flint, MI
- Dolly Fiterman Fine Arts, Minneapolis, MN
- Donald M. Kendall Sculpture Gardens at PepsiCo, Purchase, NY
- EastWest Institute, New York, Prague, Moscow, Brussels
- EcoLean International A/S, Sweden
- Enea Tree Museum, Rapperswil-Jona, Switzerland
- Four Seasons Hotel, St. Louis, MO
- Four Seasons Hotel, Singapore
- Four Seasons Park, Singapore
- Georgia Institute of Technology, Atlanta, GA
- Green Mountain Valley School, Waitsfield, VT
- Herbert F. Johnson Museum of Art, Cornell University, Ithaca, NY
- John E. Fetzer Center, Kalamazoo, MI
- JP Morgan Chase, New York, NY
- King Faisal Foundation, Riyadh, Saudi Arabia
- Lumiere Place, St. Louis, MO
- Marriott Hotel, Burlington, VT
- MGM Grand, Detroit, MI
- Minneapolis Institute of Art, Minneapolis, MN
- Museum of Fine Arts, Boston, MA
- Norton Museum of Art, Palm Beach, FL
- Princeton University Art Museum, Princeton, NJ
- Ringling College of Art and Design, Sarasota, FL
- Fleming Museum of Art, Burlington, VT
- Rockefeller Collection, New York, NY
- Sasak Peace Foundation, Tokyo, Japan
- Seven Bridges Foundation, Greenwich, CT
- Shelby Cullom Davis Foundation, Bethesda, MD
- Southern Vermont Arts Center, Manchester, VT
- Stratton Educational Foundation, Stratton Mountain, VT
- Tel Aviv Museum of Art, Tel Aviv, Israel
- The Menninger Foundation, Topeka, KS
- United Nations, New York, NY
- United States Olympic Foundation, Stowe, VT
- University of St. Thomas (Minnesota), St. Paul, MN
- University of Vermont, Burlington, VT
- Valley Hospital, Ridgewood, NJ
- Weintraub Sculpture Garden, Tel Aviv, Israel
- Kunsthalle Weishaupt, Ulm, Germany
