= John Parker (Oswego County, New York) =

American politician

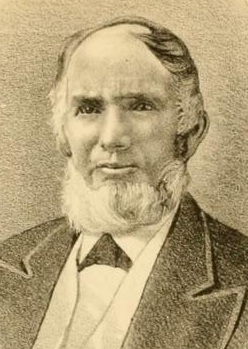
John Parker (1877)

John Parker (born December 27, 1810) was an American farmer and politician from New York.

== Life ==
He was born on December 27, 1810, in Steuben, Oneida County, New York, the son of John Parker (died 1843) and Louisa (Frisby) Parker (died 1823). On March 15, 1831, he married Polly E. Bonner (died 1873), and they had nine children. In 1834, the family moved to a farm in the Town of Orwell.

Parker was Assessor of the Town of Orwell from 1841 to 1847; Highway Commissioner for four years; and Overseer of the Poor for two years. He was a member of the New York State Assembly (Oswego Co., 3rd D.) in 1866 and 1870.

On March 11, 1874, he married Maria (Davis) Loring.

== Sources ==
New York State Assembly
Preceded by Avery W. Severance	New York State Assembly; Oswego County, 3rd District; 1866	Succeeded by Charles McKinney
Preceded by Nathan B. Smith	New York State Assembly; Oswego County, 3rd District; 1870	Succeeded by Chauncey S. Sage
