= Avery W. Severance =

American politician (1819–1874)

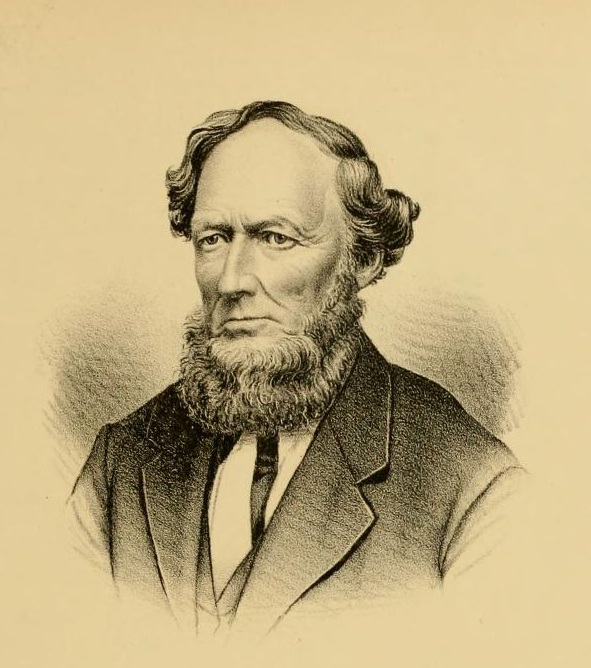
Avery W. Severance

Avery W. Severance (February 23, 1819 – February 15, 1874) was an American farmer and politician from New York.

== Life ==
He was born on February 23, 1819, in New Haven, Oswego County, New York, the son of Seth Severance (1787–1856) and Abigail S. (Wells) Severance (c. 1793 – c. 1821). In 1844, he married Julia N. Marvin (1823–1910), and they had several children. He engaged in farming, and was for some time President of the Agricultural Society of Oswego County. He became known as an intelligent mediator of local conflicts, and was appointed as guardian of dozens of orphaned children.

Severance was a Justice of the Peace in 1841; Supervisor of the Town of New Haven in 1855 and 1856, and from 1860 to 1871; and a member of the New York State Assembly (Oswego Co., 3rd D.) in 1865.

He died on February 15, 1874, in New Haven, New York.

New York State Assembly
Preceded by Harvey Palmer	New York State Assembly; Oswego County, 3rd District; 1865	Succeeded by John Parker
