= Judith Brown (sculptor) =

American sculptor (1931–1992)

- Born: December 17, 1931; New York City, New York, United States
- Died: May 11, 1992 (aged 60); New York City, New York, United States
- Known for: Sculpture, painting
- Movement: New York Figurative Expressionism

Judith Brown (December 17, 1931 – May 11, 1992) was an American dancer and a sculptor who was drawn to images of the body in motion and its effect on the cloth surrounding it. She welded crushed automobile scrap metal into energetic moving torsos, horses, and flying draperies. "One of the things that made Judy stand out as an artist was her ability to work in many different mediums. Some of this was by choice, and sometimes it was by necessity. Her surroundings often dictated what medium she could work with at any given time. After all, you can't bring you're welding gear with you to Rome."

== Education ==
Brown attended Sarah Lawrence College in Yonkers, New York (B.A., 1954), where she learned to weld from her teacher, Theodore Roszak, a pioneering abstract expressionist sculptor.

== Commissions ==
- Mural Sculpture, Lobby, Louisville Radio Station WAVE
- Fountain, commissioned by Architectural Interiors, New York City
- Model, designed and executed for Festival of 'I\\To Worlds, Spoleto, Italy
- Sculpture, designed for Electra Film Productions, NYC
- Noah's Ark, exhibited at Bronx Zoo, New York City, at Rochester Museum and Science Center, Rochester, New York, and at Hopkins Center, Hanover, New Hampshire
- Store Windows, executed Tiffany & Company Windows, New York City, Christmas 1957, 1959, 1962, October 1969, Spring 1979, and October 1980
- Wall Sculptures: for Youngstown Research Center (1963–4), commissioned by Youngstown Steel Company, Youngstown, Ohio; for Hecht and Company, Landmark Shopping Center, Alexandria, Virginia, Daniel Schwartzman, Architect; for Lobby, 570 Seventh Avenue, New York City, Giorgio Cavaglieri, Architect; for Lobby, Cities Service Company's New Research Center, Cranbury, New Jersey; for Ottauquechee Health Center, Woodstock, Vermont
- Eternal Lights: for Congregation Beth-El, South Orange, New Jersey; for Congregation Sharey Thfilo, East Orange, New Jersey
- Menorahs: commissioned by Architect Fritz Nathan for the Permanent Collection of the Jewish Museum, New York City; commissioned by Smith College for the Helen Hill Chapel, Northampton, Massachusetts; commissioned by Jules Scherman, of Wisteria Press, Inc., New York City
- Altar Cross, commissioned by Smith College for the Helen Hill Chapel, Northampton, Massachusetts
- Landscape, Memorial Piece for Gustave Heller, YM-YWCA, Essex County, New Jersey
- Memorial Plaque for Robert A. Ferguson, Westchester County Airport, Purchase, New York
- Sculpture for Vice President's office, Atlantic Richfield Company, New York City
- Bronze Relief Sculpture for Gymnasium Lobby, South Richmond High School, Staten Island, New York, Daniel Schwartzman, Architect
- Poster, Stratton Arts Festival, Stratton, Vermont
- Medallion, commissioned by Brandeis University National Women's Committee, New York City
- Model for Fountain for the Plaza at Windsor, Vermont
- Bronze Sculpture, commissioned by Intramural, Inc. for Building Lobby, N/E Cor. 79th Street and Second Avenue, New York City
- Presentation Piece, commissioned by Graphic Arts Associates of Delaware Valley, Philadelphia, Pennsylvania
- Wall Mural, Noah's Ark, Roosevelt Hospital, New York City
- 1977: Designed and executed Hanes Hosiery "Million Dollar Award"; Designed and executed "Old Spice" Smart Ship Award
- 1978: Commissioned to design and execute the "Walter White Award" for the NAACP for presentation to Hubert Humphrey; Commissioned to design and execute the Award for the Honorees of the National Board YWCA's First Tribute to Women in International Industry
- 1979: Designed and executed Jewelry for the Museum of Modern Art, New York City; Designed and executed limited edition of Mazuzas for Brandeis University-National Women's Committee, New York City
- 1980: Bronze Cross (6 x 3 foot! commissioned for St. James Episcopal Church, Woodstock, Vermont
- 1982: Eubie Award, New York Chapter of the National Academy of Recording Arts and Sciences
- 1985: Two Sculptures, Marriott Hotel, Orlando, Florida
- 1986: Two large Sculptures for indoor reflecting pools, Palm Desert Hotel, Palm Springs, California; John Portman, Eight Sculptures for Peachtree Plaza Hotel, Atlanta, Georgia; John Portman, Beach House, Sea Island, Georgia
- 1987: Loan Installation, DeCordova Museum, Lincoln, Massachusetts
- 1988: Eleven foot outdoor Sculpture for Front Plaza, River Court, Charles River, East Cambridge, Massachusetts, H. J. Davis Development Corp.; Tomie dePaola, Outdoor Sculpture of Bird, New London, New Hampshire
- 1989: Room Screen, 51/2 feet, Rita Moreno, Los Angeles, California; Martha Graham Award for presentation to her in Boston, Massachusetts
- 1990: Fireplace Screen, Sharon Mills, Chattanooga, Tennessee

== Selected exhibitions ==
- 1957: "The Patron Church", Museum of Contemporary Crafts, New York City
- 1958: Dallas Museum of Art, Dallas, Texas; The Jewish Museum, New York City
- 1959: Detroit Institute of Arts; Pennsylvania Academy of the Fine Arts, Philadelphia
- 1962: National Academy of Art and Letters, New York City
- 1963: Arkansas Arts Center, Little Rock, Arkansas; Newport Art Association, Newport, Rhode Island
- 1964: "West Side Artists", Riverside Museum, New York City; "The Crafts and Worship", Dallas Museum of Art, Dallas, Texas; Hopkins Center, Dartmouth College, Hanover, New Hampshire
- 1966: "Recent Acquisitions", Aldrich Museum of Contemporary Art, Ridgefield, Connecticut; Byron Gallery, New York City
- 1967: Byron Gallery, New York City; Southern Vermont Art Center, Manchester, Vermont; University of New Hampshire, Durham, New Hampshire
- 1968: New Britain Museum of American Art, New Britain, Connecticut; "Exhibit of Encaustic Drawings", Kanegis Gallery, Boston, Massachusetts
- 1969: Graham Gallery, New York City
- 1970: "Birds and Beasts", Graham Gallery, New York City
- 1971: Art Gallery of Ontario, Toronto
- 1972: Brandeis University, Waltham, Massachusetts; SUNY, Plattsburgh, New York
- 1973: Fairleigh Dickinson University, William Penn Memorial Museum, Harrisburg, Pennsylvania; Sculpture in Tiffany & Co. Windows, New York City
- 1974: DeCordova Museum, Lincoln, Massachusetts; Hopkins Center, Dartmouth College, Hanover, New Hampshire; Library Art Center, Newport, New Hampshire
- 1975: "New England Women", DeCordova Museum, Lincoln, Massachusetts; "Animal Sculpture", New Britain Museum of American Art, New Britain, Connecticut; "From Vermont: Past to Present", Gallery 641, Washington, D.C.; Art Association of Newport, Rhode Island; Brattleboro Museum and Art Center, Brattleboro, Vermont
- 1976: The 41st International Eucharistic Congress, Philadelphia, Pennsylvania; Montshire Museum, Hanover, New Hampshire
- 1977: Group Show sponsored by Artists Equity, Union Carbide Building, New York City; Institute for the Arts of the Archdiocese of Washington, Gallery Kormendy, Alexandria, Virginia; Contemporary Arts Gallery, Loeb Student Center, New York University, New York City
- 1979: "Judaica II" sponsored by the YM-YWHA of Metropolitan New Jersey, West Orange, New Jersey; Special Exhibition of Sculpture, Tiffany and Company, New York City; The Brattleboro Museum, Brattleboro, Vermont; Fleming Museum, University of Vermont, Burlington, Vermont; Visual Artists' Coalition, Connecticut College for Women
- 1980: One man shows: New York University, Contemporary Arts Gallery, Washington Square Park, New York City; St. Gaudens Museum, Cornish, New Hampshire; Tiffany and Company Windows, New York City; Group Show: "The Figure", sponsored by Pratt Institute
- 1983: One Man Shows: Howard Monroe Gallery, Chapel Hill, North Carolina; Alwin Gallery, London; Group shows: "Regional Selections", Hood Museum of Art, Dartmouth College, Hanover, New Hampshire
- 1983/5: Participant in Outdoor Sculpture Installation at Rose Hill Campus, Fordham University, New York City
- 1984: Helen Day Art Center, Stowe, Vermont
- 1985: DeCordova Museum, Lincoln, Massachusetts; Hopkins Center, Dartmouth College, Hanover, New Hampshire (Best in Show Award)
- 1986: The Women's Museum, Washington, D.C. (Sculpture acquired for permanent collection)
- 1987: Tiffany's Windows, Tiffany and Co., New York City
- 1988: One Man Show: Southern Vermont Art Center, Manchester, Vermont
- 1989: One man show: National Museum of Dance, Saratoga Springs, New York; Group Show: 4th International Contemporary Art Fair, London; Tiffany's Windows, Tiffany and Co., New York City
- 1990: National Museum of American Jewish History, Philadelphia, Pennsylvania

== Permanent collections ==
- Pepsi Company, Pepsi Co. Sculpture Gardens, Purchase, New York
- Cabot Foundations, Boston, Massachusetts
- Verlaime Foundations, New Orleans, Louisiana
- Marriott Corporation, Orlando, Florida
- Marriott Corporation, Palm Desert Hotel, Palm Springs, California
- Memorial Art Gallery, Rochester, New York
- Evansville Museum, Evansville, Indiana
- Riverside Museum, New York City
- Aldrich Contemporary Art Museum, Ridgefield, Connecticut
- Cuernavaca Cathedral, Cuernavaca, Mexico
- Dartmouth College, Hanover, New Hampshire
- Bundy Art Gallery, Waitsfield, Vermont
- Dallas Museum of Art, Dallas, Texas
- Museum of Modern Art, New York City
- Vermont Law School, South Royalton, Vermont (purchased "Don Quixote" for their permanent collection)
- Widener University Museum of Art, Chester, Pennsylvania (received "Mountain and Steeples" for their permanent collection as a gift of Mr. and Mrs. Meyer P. Potamkin)
- Gallery Kormendy, Alexandria, Virginia
- Jewish Museum, New York City
- DeCordova Museum, Lincoln, Massachusetts (sculpture)
- Brooklyn Museum, Brooklyn, New York (sculpture)
- National Bank of Boston, Boston, Massachusetts (2 ink and watercolor drawings)
- National Museum of Dance, Saratoga Springs, New York (large Athena)

== Awards ==
- 1958: Honorable Mention, Gold Medal Competition, Architectural League of New York City
- 1959: Frank J. Lewis Award at Tenth Annual Christocentric Arts Festival, Newman Foundation, University of Illinois
- 1964: Sculpture Award at Silvermine Guild of Artists' 5th New England Exhibition
- 1967: Silvermine Guild of Artists' Finch Award for Sculpture at 18th Annual New England Competition
- 1970: Louis Comfort Tiffany Foundation on Award, New York City
- 1974: Honorable Mention, Friends of Hopkins Center Exhibit, Hanover, New Hampshire
- 1976: Award for Creative Work in Art: The National Academy of Art and Letters, New York City; Best in Show Award: "Vermont Artists '76", Brattleboro Museum, Brattleboro, Vermont; Sculpture Award: Wadsworth Atheneum, Connecticut Academy of Fine Arts, Hartford, Connecticut; Best in Show Award: Saenger National Jewelry and Small Sculpture Exhibit, University of Southern Mississippi, Hattiesburg, Mississippi
- 1986: Best in Show Award: Hopkins Center, Hanover, New Hampshire
