= Burr and Burton Academy =

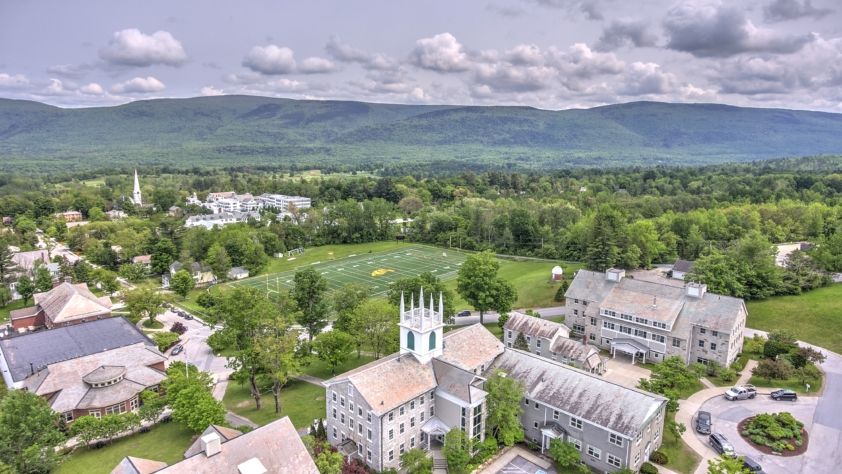

Location
- 57 Seminary Avenue; Manchester, Vermont 05254; United States; 43.1636875°N 73.0781602°W

Information
- Other name: BBA
- Type: Private, non-profit, day and boarding school
- Motto: Offering every student a world of opportunities
- Established: 1829; 197 years ago
- NCES School ID: A1503901
- Headmaster: Mark Tashjian
- Teaching staff: 69.8 (on an FTE basis)
- Grades: 9–12
- Gender: Co-educational
- Enrollment: 714 (2017-2018)
- Student to teacher ratio: 10.2
- Colors: Green and gold
- Mascot: Bulldog
- Website: www.burrburton.org

Burr and Burton Academy (BBA) is a private, non-profit, co-educational, day and boarding school in Manchester, Vermont, United States. It was established in 1829 through a bequest from local businessman Joseph Burr.

In addition to serving local students and families, BBA offers a boarding program for international students.

== Admissions ==
Burr and Burton Academy accepts all students from designated "sending towns," which vote annually to approve the school's tuition and pay the cost through education funding. Admission is also open on an annual basis to students from other, non-sending towns, as well as through BBA's International Program.

Tuition for the 2023–24 school year is $19,987 for sending town students; $22,487 for non-sending town students; and $59,500 for boarding international students.

== Notable alumni ==
- James K. Batchelder, Speaker of the Vermont House of Representatives
- Jacob Benton, congressman
- Charity Clark, Vermont Attorney General
- Sarah Norcliffe Cleghorn, educator, author, social reformer and poet
- Carroll William Dodge, mycologist and lichenologist
- Richard Erdman, artist
- Fred A. Field, U.S. marshal for Vermont
- Kevin Hand, astrobiologist and planetary scientist
- John C. Hollister, tenth Connecticut adjutant general
- Lyman Enos Knapp, politician and lawyer
- Marcia Neugebauer, American geophysicist
- John B. Page, governor of Vermont
- Kelly Pajala, member of the Vermont House of Representatives
- Frederick M. Reed, attorney and businessman
- Joseph Wickham Roe, engineer and professor
- Betsy Shaw, American snowboarder
- Nathan B. Smith, New York lawyer and politician
- Ormsby B. Thomas, congressman
- Stephen A. Walker, U.S. attorney for the Southern District of New York
- Mark Whalon, poet and author
- Bill Wilson, co-founder of Alcoholics Anonymous

== Notable staff ==
- Lyman Coleman, former principal
- Harvey Dorfman, former coach
- Richard C. Overton, former teacher
- Charles C. Stroud, former teacher
