= Locking Piece =

Sculpture series by Henry Moore

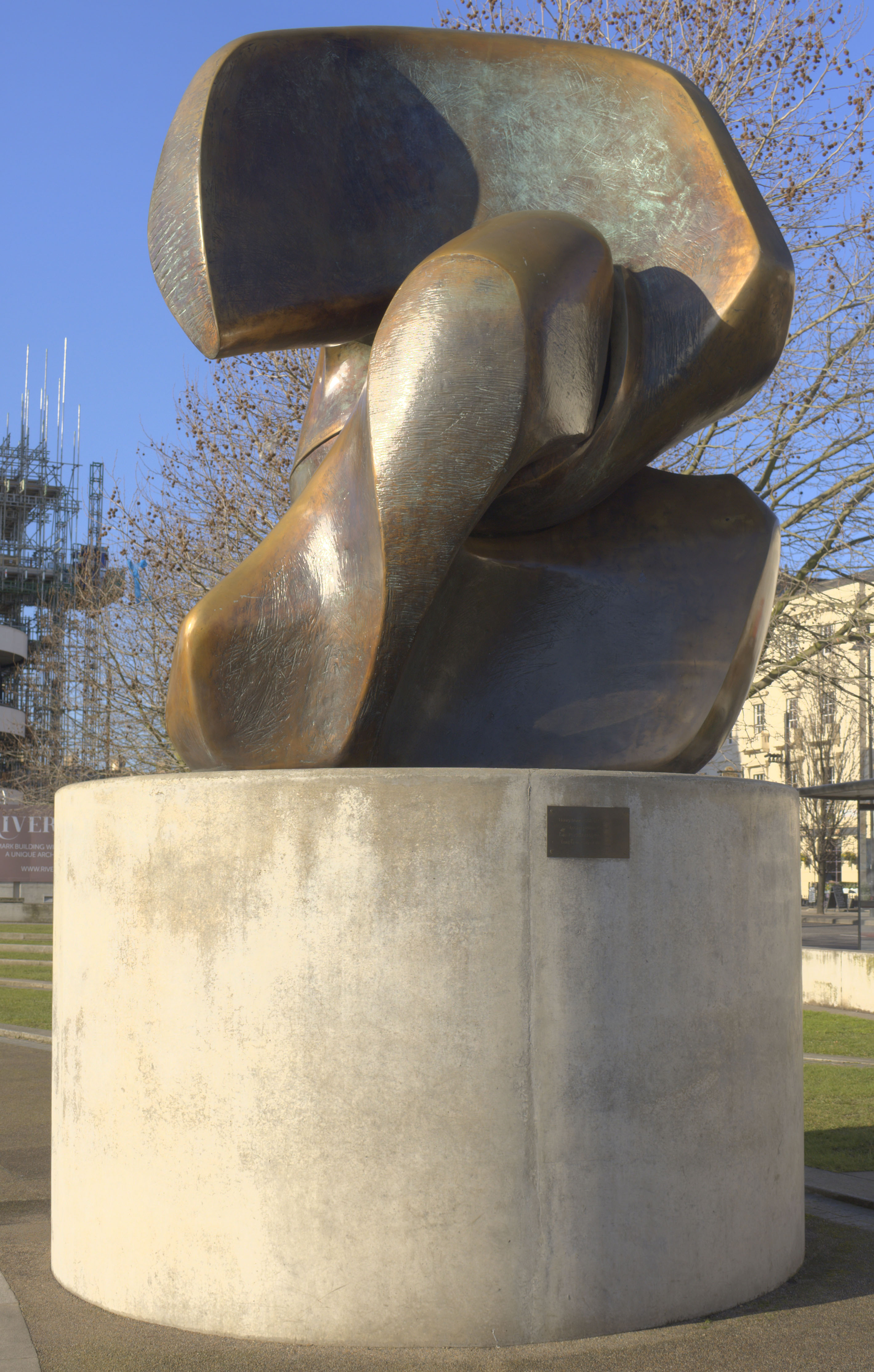
- At Millbank, London, in 2015
- Artist: Henry Moore
- Year: 1962–1964
- Catalogue: LH 515
- Medium: Bronze
- Dimensions: 292 cm (115 in)

Locking Piece (LH 515) is a sculpture by Henry Moore. It comprises two interlocking forms holding a third element between them, on a bronze base. It is usually mounted on a separate plinth. The sculpture was created in 1962–1964, and bronze casts were made in 1964–1967.

The work has an organic form that defies description, with different amorphous shapes visible from different angles. It has a central hole, where the top piece rises over the bottom piece; at one end, the two larger elements are separated by a third smaller disc-like element, like a piece of cartilage. In the words of Donald Hall in his biography of Moore published in 1966, it has "two parts which fit together like a child's puzzle. It doesn't resemble one thing."

Moore gave different accounts of the inspiration for the sculpture: it may reflect his observations of two pebbles that unexpectedly interlocked, or of a sawn bone fragment with a joint. The lower piece may be developed from a vertebra. He probably created small plaster models or maquettes, but none have survived and none were cast. A working model (LH 514) was created in plaster in 1962 (now held by the Art Gallery of Ontario) and then cast in bronze in 1962 in an edition of nine. It measures 104 by 88 by 85 centimetres (41 in × 35 in × 33 in). There are examples of the bronze casting at the Donald M. Kendall Sculpture Gardens in Purchase, New York, the Munson-Williams-Proctor Arts Institute in Utica, New York, the Lehmbruck Museum in Duisburg, the National Museum of Contemporary Art in Bucharest and at the Henry Moore Foundation in Perry Green, Hertfordshire.

A full-size plaster version was built up in layers over an armature, with Moore making minor alterations to the initial version copied by his assistants from the working model, and Moore then worked on its surface with a variety of tools. The plaster model was finished in January 1964, and then sent to the Hermann Noack foundry in Berlin to be used to make the sand mould for a version cast in bronze. It was cast in about 50 pieces which were welded together to complete the final full-size bronze sculpture, which was then patinated with chemicals and lacquered. The original plaster version has disappeared: it may have been destroyed after the bronzes were cast. A second full-size plaster version was exhibited at the Tate Gallery in 1964: the Tate declined the opportunity to buy it, and it was destroyed in 1971. Two full-size fibreglass versions were cast in 1971, both held by the Henry Moore Foundation in Perry Green, Hertfordshire.

Three bronze casts were originally made, including one artist's model, and a fourth was created much later in 1987, measuring 293.5 by 208 by 260 centimetres (115.6 in × 81.9 in × 102.4 in), and weighing about 1,800 kilograms (4,000 lb).

The first full-size bronze cast was exhibited at Documenta 3 in Kassel in 1964, and then installed outside the building of the Banque Lambert at Marnixlaan in Brussels. This cast was exhibited at the Rijksmuseum in Amsterdam in 2013, and in Santiago de Compostela in 2016.

A second full-size bronze was also cast in 1964. It was acquired by the Gemeentemuseum in The Hague, where it is displayed on a brick plinth outside the gallery.

A third cast, now owned by Tate, was the artist's copy. It was displayed at British Pavilion at the Montreal Expo in 1967, and has been on public display on the Thames Embankment, at Riverside Walk Gardens in Millbank, near the Tate Gallery, since returning to the UK in 1968, where it was mounted on a hexagonal base, sprayed by six fountains. The sculpture was presented to the Tate Gallery by the artist in 1978. It was blown off its base by a very strong gust of wind in 1990 and severely damaged: it was reinstated after repairs by the Noack foundry, but moved to a new taller cylindrical concrete plinth in 2004.

A fourth cast was produced in 1987, and is held by the Henry Moore Foundation.

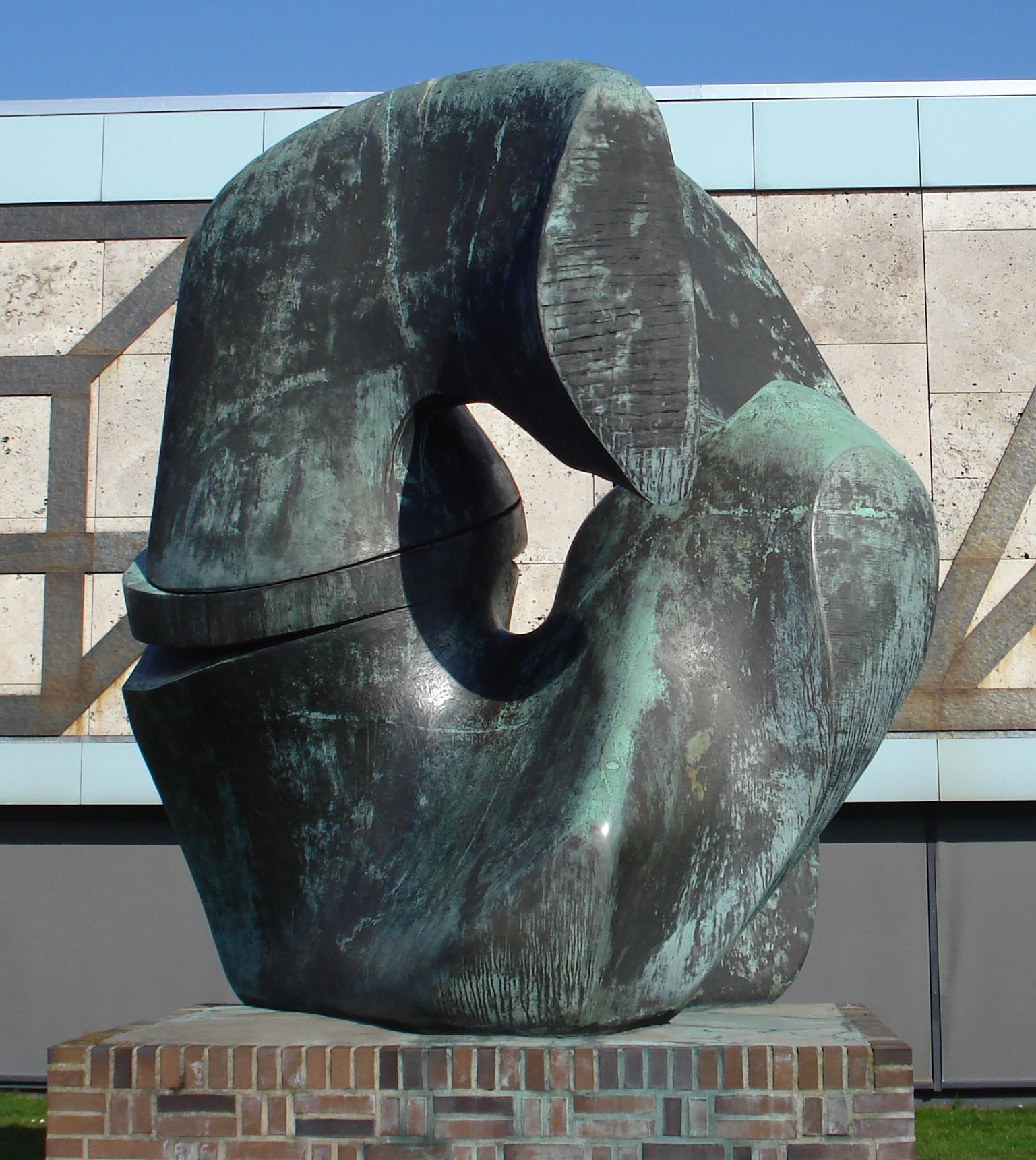
Cast 2, Gemeentemuseum, The Hague, 2010

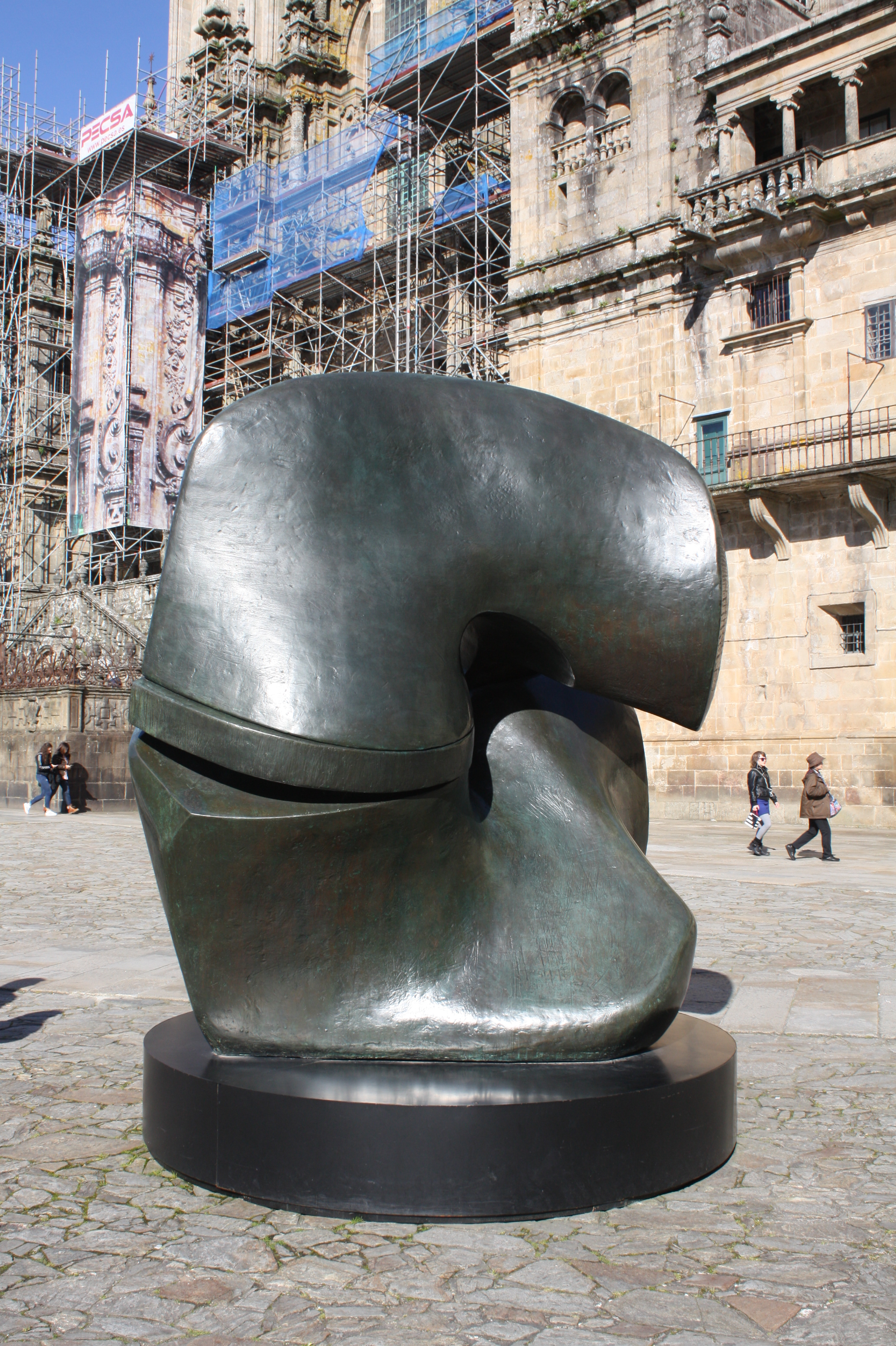
Cast exhibited in Santiago de Compostela, 2016

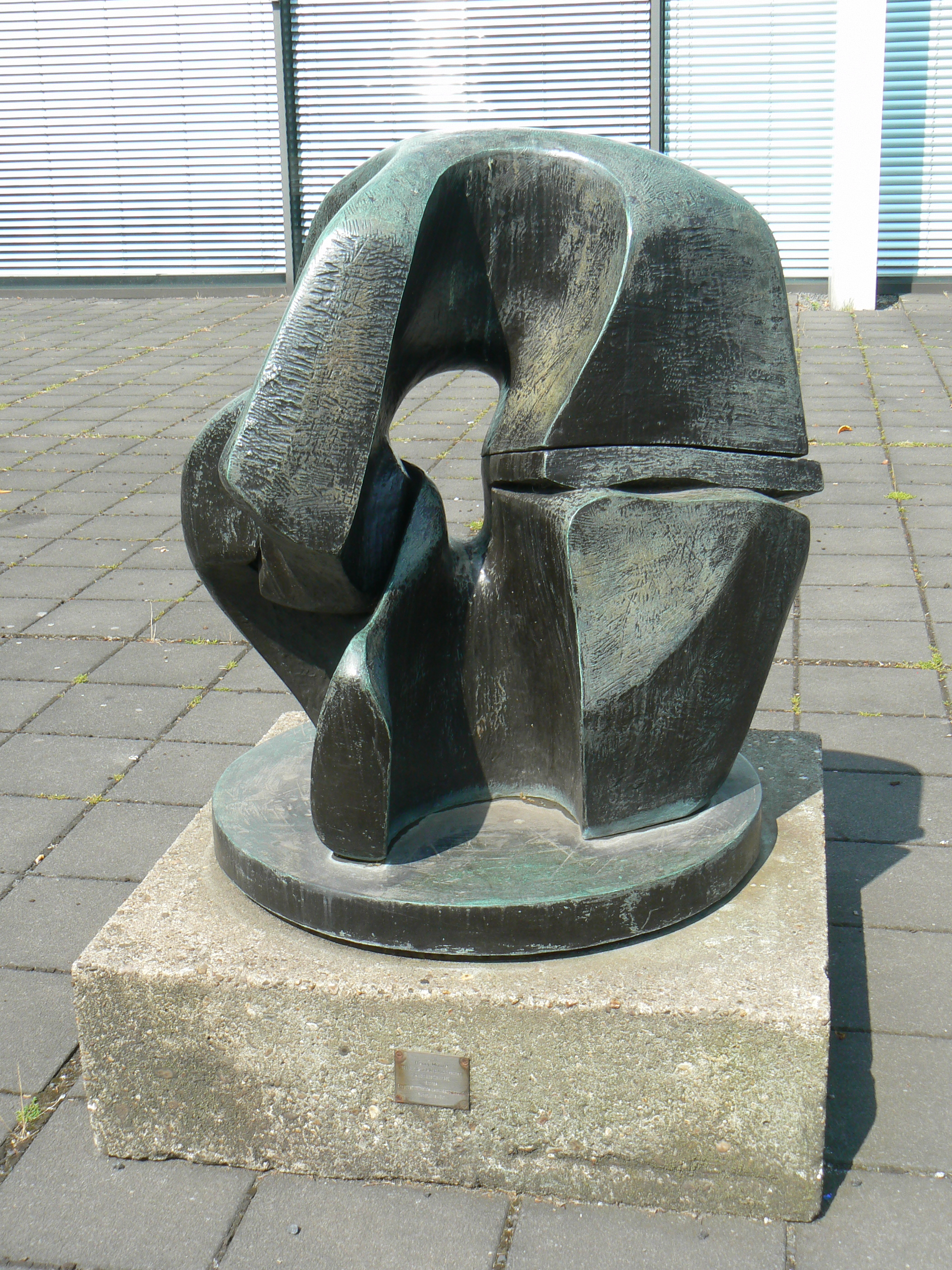
Working model (LH 514 cast b), Duisburg, 2008

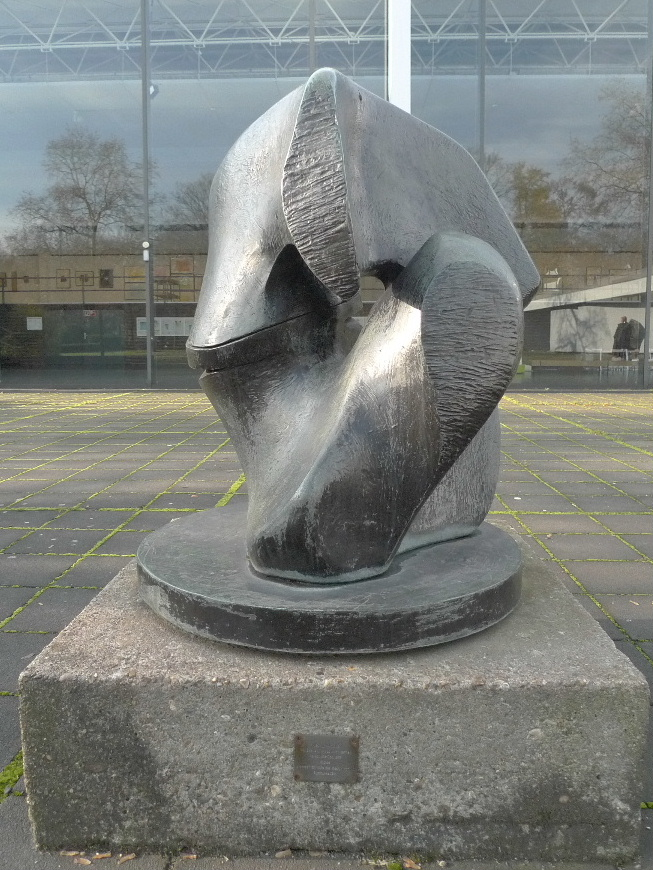
Working model (LH 514 cast b), Duisburg, 2010

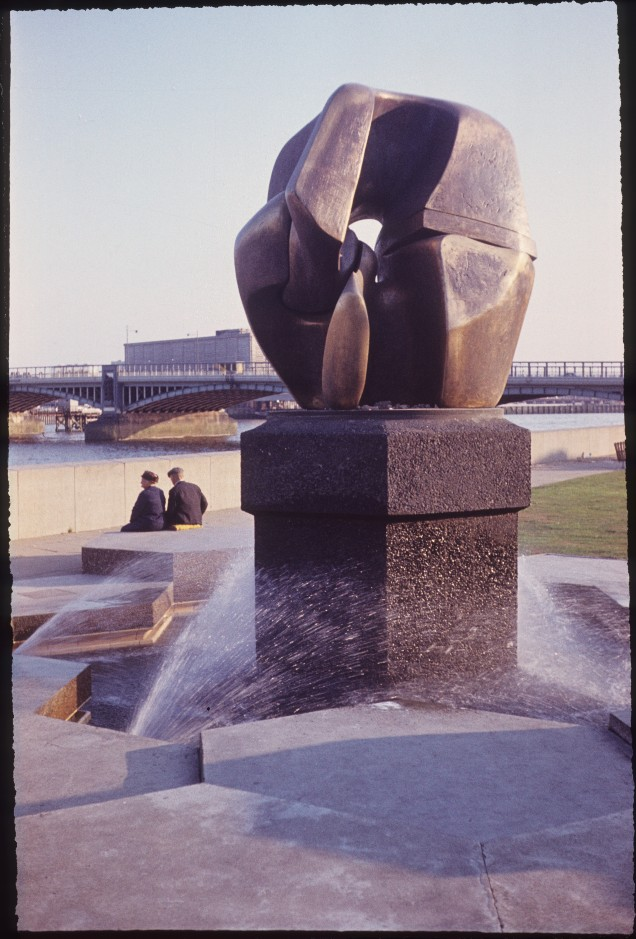
The original mounting of the Millbank cast, with fountains

== See also ==
- List of sculptures by Henry Moore
