= The Family of Man (Hepworth) =

- Nine Figures on a Hill
- Artist: Barbara Hepworth
- Year: 1970s
- Catalogue: BH 513
- Medium: Bronze sculpture
- Dimensions: 2.4 m (8 ft)
- Location: Yorkshire Sculpture Park; Donald M. Kendall Sculpture Gardens

The Family of Man (BH 513) is a series of nine abstract sculptures (BH 513a to 513i) by the British artist Barbara Hepworth. Created as plaster models in 1970s, an edition of 4+2 (four castings of each individual figure, plus two complete sets) was cast by the Morris Singer foundry in 1972 and 1974. It was one of the last major works completed by Hepworth before her death in 1975.

Sometimes known by an early title Nine Figures on a Hill, the series comprises nine large bronze standing sculptures each about 8 ft (2.4 m) high, that can be arranged as an ensemble to represent a group of people. They have been compared to Stone Age menhirs, and may take inspiration from Edward Steichen touring photography exhibition entitled The Family of Man. Each figure is modular, formed from several stacked geometric shapes, similar enough to be part of the same family, but gradually becoming more complicated as they progress through different stages of life, with two shapes for Youth and Young Girl, three for Parent II and The Bride, and four each for Ancestor I, Ancestor II, Parent I, The Bridegroom, and Ultimate Form. The seven different titles for the nine figures recall the seven ages of man.

A complete series has been displayed by the Yorkshire Sculpture Park since 1980 (on loan from the Hepworth Estate). There is a complete series at the Donald M. Kendall Sculpture Gardens at PepsiCo in Purchase, New York (previously, a complete series was displayed outside First City Tower in Houston, Texas). The Fitzwilliam Museum holds three casts - Ancestor I, Ancestor II, and Parent I - which have been displayed outside Snape Maltings since 1976. Three other casts - Parent II, Parent I, Young Girl - are displayed outside The Hepworth Wakefield. A cast of Ancestor I, is displayed at the University of Birmingham (on loan from the Hepworth Estate) and another at the L'esplanade Laurier in Ottawa. A cast of Figure 2, Ancestor II, is held by the Columbus Museum of Art; and a cast of Figure 9, Ultimate Form, is held the Adelaide Festival Centre Trust.

A cast of Figure 6, Young Girl, was sold at Christies in 2004 for US$242,700. A cast of Figure 8, The Bride, was sold at Christies in 2019 for £3,838,250. A cast of Figure 2, Ancestor II was sold at Christies in 2023 for US$11,565,000.

- Figure 1, Ancestor I - four elements that can be interpreted as a wide head, a smaller torso, wider hips, and cube for legs
- Figure 2, Ancestor II - four stacked cubes, each pierced by a cylindrical hole, with different orientations
- Figure 3, Youth - two elements: the lower flat and hollowed like a dish, the upper flat and pieced by one hole
- Figure 4, Parent I - four elements: a vertical dish, a cube, a horizontal dish, and another cube
- Figure 5, Parent II - four elements: a dish-like head, a cube, and a long shape with vertical step resembling legs
- Figure 6, Young Girl - two elements: a wide dish-like head, on a vertically lengthened dish
- Figure 7, Bridegroom - four elements: a head, and three rectangles
- Figure 8, The Bride - three elements: a long pierced dish, a rectangle, and a long dish
- Figure 9, Ultimate Form - four elements: a pieced semicircle, a cube, and two rectangles
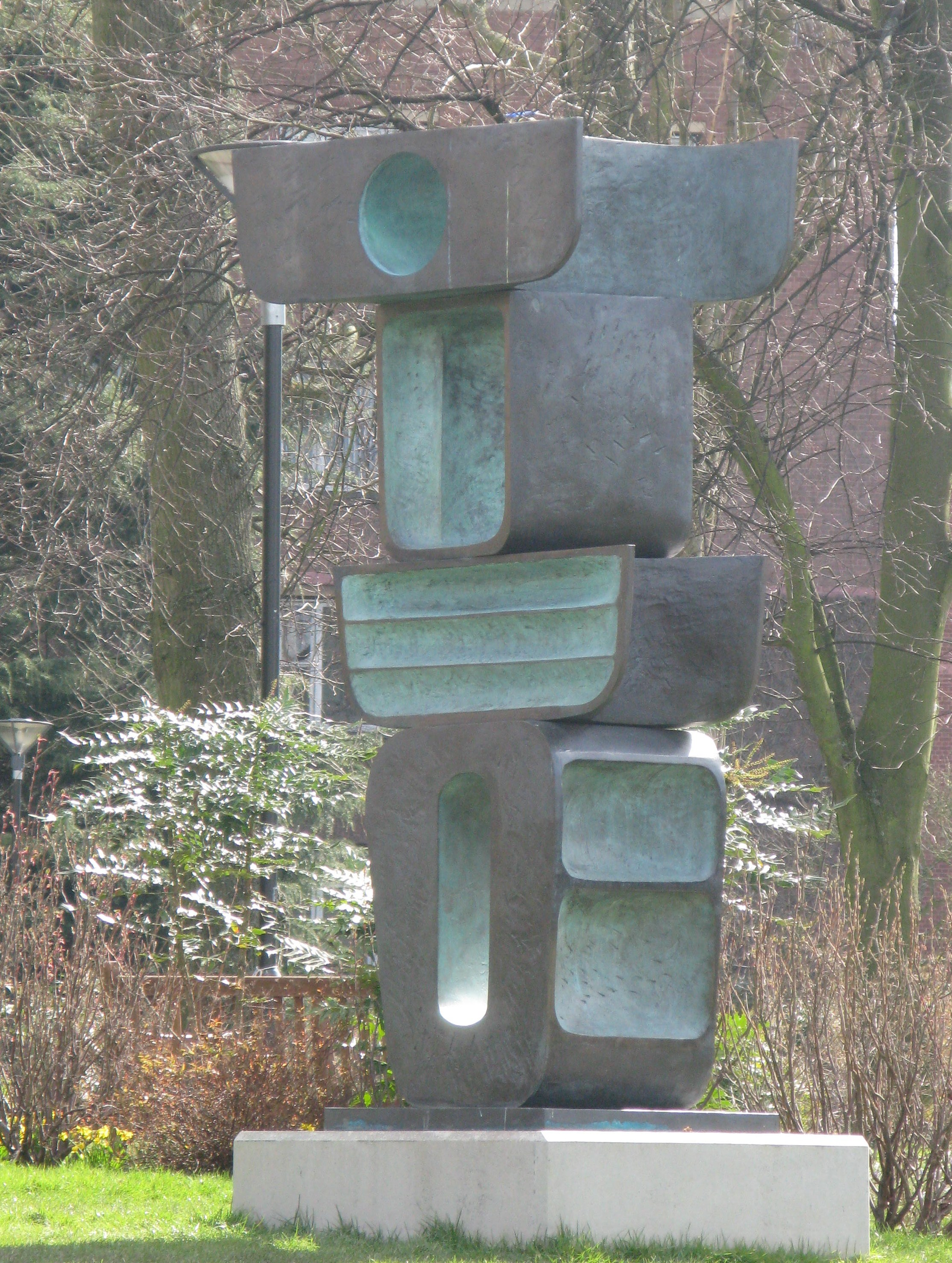
Ancestor I, University of Birmingham, in 2013

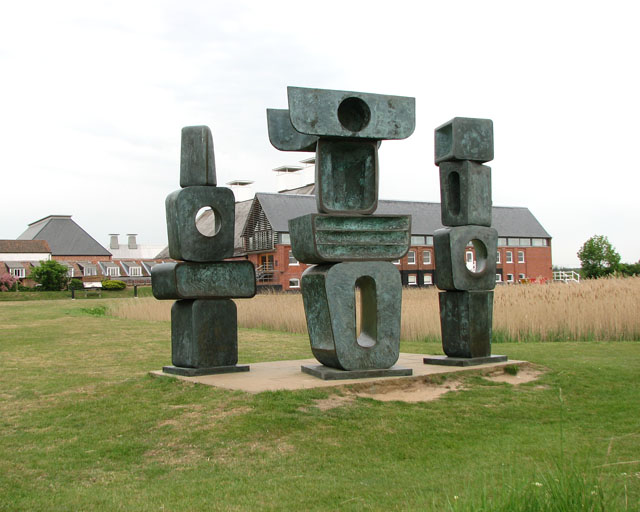
Parent I, Ancestor I, Ancestor II, at Snape Maltings, in 2010

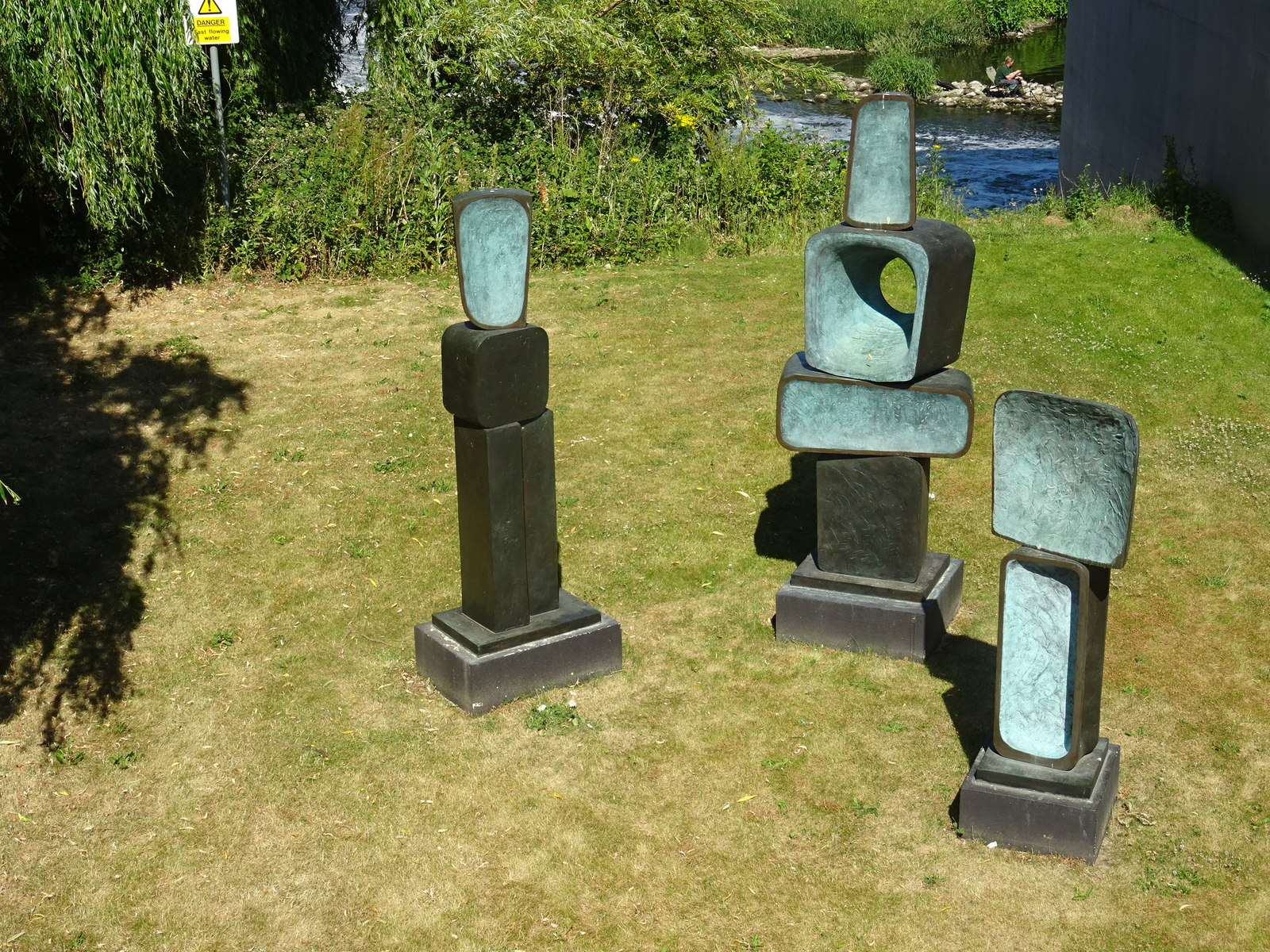
Parent II, Parent I, Young Girl, outside The Hepworth Wakefield

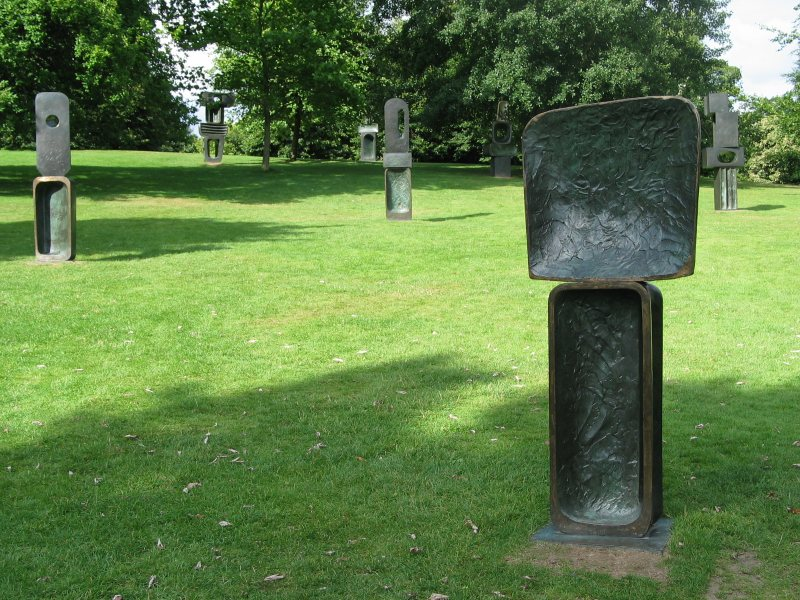
Figures on a hill at Yorkshire Sculpture Park
