= Bret Price =

American sculptor (born 1950)

- Born: 1950 (age 75–76)
- Education: Pomona College; California Institute of the Arts
- Known for: Sculpture
- Spouse: Rae Lynn Price
- Children: 2

Bret Price (born 1950) is an American sculptor known for his large-scale work with steel. His work has been included in the permanent collections of the Smithsonian American Art Museum and the Donald M. Kendall Sculpture Gardens, among others.

== Early life ==
Price was born in Palo Alto, California. His father, Harrison “Buzz” Price, worked with Walt Disney, and encouraged him to pursue his passions.

Price attended Pomona College in Claremont, California. He initially pursued pre-med but switched majors after taking a ceramics class and graduated in 1972. He then attended the Otis Art Institute for a year and earned a master of fine arts from the California Institute of the Arts in Santa Clarita in 1975.

== Career ==
External image
- "Nori" (2007) at Domaine Forget in Quebec, Canada

From 1976 to 1987, Price was an assistant professor at Chapman University.

Price's early works were in ceramics, but he turned to steel beginning in 1979. His creations grew in scale over time, eventually reaching up to 35 feet (11 m) in height and weighing 7.5 short tons (6.8 t). His artistic process consists of heating pieces of steel to high temperatures using propane gas and then bending, twisting, and rolling them using a forklift, giving them a supple and flexible appearance.

Price's work has been included in the permanent collections of the Smithsonian American Art Museum, the Donald M. Kendall Sculpture Gardens, the Laguna Beach Museum of Art, the Long Beach Museum of Art, the Orange County Museum of Art, and the Dayton Art Institute, among others.

== Personal life ==
Price splits his time between Orange, California, where he works at the studio Logan Creative, and New Bremen, Ohio. He made several sculptures for his backyard in Orange, including an 11-foot-long (3.4 m), 1,500-pound (680 kg) zipper.

Price is married to Rae Lynn Price (née Olson). He has a daughter, Erin, and a son, Greg, who is a glass artist.
