= Lyman Coleman =

American scholar and author (1796–1882)

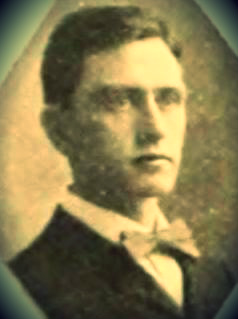
Lyman Coleman. The Index (1898) (14793127233) (cropped)

Lyman Coleman (June 14, 1796 – March 16, 1882) was an American scholar of ancient and modern languages. He was a professor of German at Princeton University and professor of Latin and Greek at Lafayette College. His notable works included History of Primitive Christianity and An Historical Text Book and Atlas of Biblical Geography.

== Early life and education ==
Coleman, younger son of Dr. William and Achsah (Lyman) Coleman, was born in Middlefield, Mass., June 14, 1796. He graduated from Yale College in 1817.

== Career ==
On leaving College he was for three years a teacher in the Latin Grammar School in Hartford, Conn., and then entered on a tutorship at Yale, which he retained for four and a half years, at the same time pursuing theological studies. He was ordained, October 19, 1825, as pastor of the Congregational Church in Belchertown, Mass., and was dismissed from this charge at his own request, September 4, 1832.

For the next five years, he was principal of the Burr Seminary, Manchester, Vt., and was then for an equal period principal of the English department of Phillips Academy, in Andover, Mass.

The year 1842–43 was spent abroad, chiefly in Germany, in obtaining materials for a revised edition of a work on the Antiquities of the Christian Church, which he had compiled in 1841, and in preparation for a work on The Apostolical and Primitive Church, which appeared in 1844, with an introduction by Dr. August Neander.

After his return he resided in Amherst, Mass., for three years, being employed as instructor in Latin and Greek in Amherst College. From 1847 to 1849 he held the Professorship of German in Princeton College, and for the next nine years he was engaged in classical instruction in Philadelphia. Later he made an extended visit to Europe and the East, and in 1861 he was appointed to the chair of Ancient Languages in Lafayette College, Easton, Pa., which he held until his death, though after 1868 his instruction was confined to Latin, Hebrew, and Biblical Geography. In November 1880, when he was probably the oldest College professor in active service in America, he was stricken with paralysis, and he failed gradually until his death, at Easton, March 16, 1882, in his 86th year. The degree of D. D. was conferred upon him by Princeton in 1847.

Besides the works above mentioned, Coleman published a Historical Geography of the Bible (1850), Ancient Christianity Exemplified (1852), Historical Text Book and Atlas of Biblical Geography (1854), and Genealogy of the Lyman Family (1872); several of these works passed through many editions, in the United States and in England, and they were supplemented by numerous other briefer writings.

== Personal life ==
He was married, September 21, 1826, to Maria, daughter of Rufus Flynt, of Monson, Mass., who died January 11, 1871. In October 1873, he was married to Marion B. Philleo, who survived him. His two daughters, by his first marriage, died before him.
