= The Family of Man: Figure 2, Ancestor II =

Sculpture by Barbara Hepworth in Columbus, Ohio, U.S.

- The sculpture in 2018
- Artist: Barbara Hepworth
- Year: 1970
- Medium: Bronze sculpture
- Location: Columbus, Ohio, United States
- 39°57′53.74″N 82°59′17.36″W

The Family of Man: Figure 2, Ancestor II, or simply Ancestor II, is a 1970 bronze sculpture by Barbara Hepworth, installed outside the Columbus Museum of Art, in Columbus, Ohio, United States. The approximately 8-foot (2.4 m) sculpture has four cubes stacked on top of one another. The Smithsonian Institution describes the artwork as abstract and allegorical, representing family. It was gifted by Nationwide Mutual Insurance Company to commemorate the museum's 125th anniversary.

== See also ==
- 1970 in art
- The Family of Man (Hepworth)
