= Nathan B. Smith =

American lawyer and politician

Nathan Button Smith (December 3, 1841 – April 13, 1920) was an American lawyer and politician from Pulaski, New York.

== Life ==
Smith was born on December 3, 1841, in Danby, Vermont. He was the son of Nathan J. Smith, a store owner and member of the Vermont General Assembly, and Alzina Button, the daughter of farmer and Vermont Senate member Frederick Button.

Smith attended the district school and a select school in a neighboring village. In 1857, he began attending Burr and Burton Seminary. He then went to Middlebury College, graduating from there in 1863 with the highest honors in his class. He spent a few months studying in the law office of Governor John Wolcott Stewart of Middlebury. In 1864, he was an assistant clerk of the Vermont House of Representatives. He joined the paymaster's department in 1863, and in 1864 he became an army correspondent.

In the fall of 1865, Smith moved to Pulaski, New York, where he spent nearly two years as principal of the Pulaski Academy. He studied law in the office of S. C. Huntington, and in 1868 he was admitted to the bar and began working as a lawyer. In 1868, he was elected to the New York State Assembly as a Republican, representing the Oswego County 3rd District. He served in the Assembly in 1869. He was the youngest Assembly member in that year. He declined a renomination so he could return to his law practice. He was elected special surrogate in 1874 and served a three-year term. He was elected district attorney in 1881 and served a three-year term. In 1898, he was appointed Referee in Bankruptcy for the District of Oswego County.

Smith attended the Congregational Church and was a member of the Freemasons. In 1872, he married Ellen Grinnell Cornell. They had two children, Cornell and Walter D.

Smith died at home on April 13, 1920. His funeral was held at his home library. The funeral service was conducted by Rev. Frank H. Ferris, pastor of the Congregational Church Smith was a member of. Ferris and Smith's brother Rev. Walter D. Smith of Yates City, Illinois delivered eulogies. Justice Irving G. Hubbs was a pallbearer. He was buried in the Pulaski cemetery.

New York State Assembly
Preceded by Alvin Richardson	New York State Assembly; Oswego County, 3rd District; 1869	Succeeded by John Parker
