= John E. Fetzer Center =

Conference center

Coordinates: 42.2850°N 85.6179°W

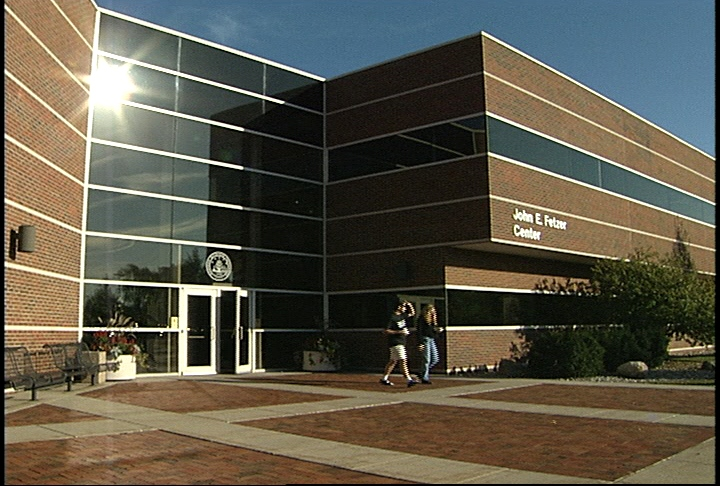
The John E. Fetzer Center, Western Michigan University, Kalamazoo, Michigan.

The John E. Fetzer Center is a conference center and special events facility at Western Michigan University in Kalamazoo, Michigan, USA. It was opened in 1983 and named for the radio pioneer and Detroit Tigers owner John Fetzer. The facility’s lounge and exhibition area features a display of Fetzer’s life and accomplishments.

The Fetzer Center is a multi usage full service center with on-site catering and videoconferencing capabilities. Meeting rooms include the 250-seat Kirsch Auditorium and the 90-seat Putney Lecture Hall, as well as seven additional meeting rooms. The Fetzer Center also has a 280-person capacity banquet hall as well as an outdoor patio and deck that are also used for wedding ceremonies and receptions.

The Fetzer Center is the location for several social engagements for Western Michigan University faculty, staff, and students. The Fetzer Center hosts an annual Champagne Brunch for graduates and their families and a holiday luncheon with Santa for faculty, staff and their families, and Kalamazoo-area residents. The facility is open to both University and non-University events.
