= Hopkins Center for the Arts =

Arts center at Dartmouth College

Coordinates: 43°42′06″N 72°17′19″W

Hopkins Center
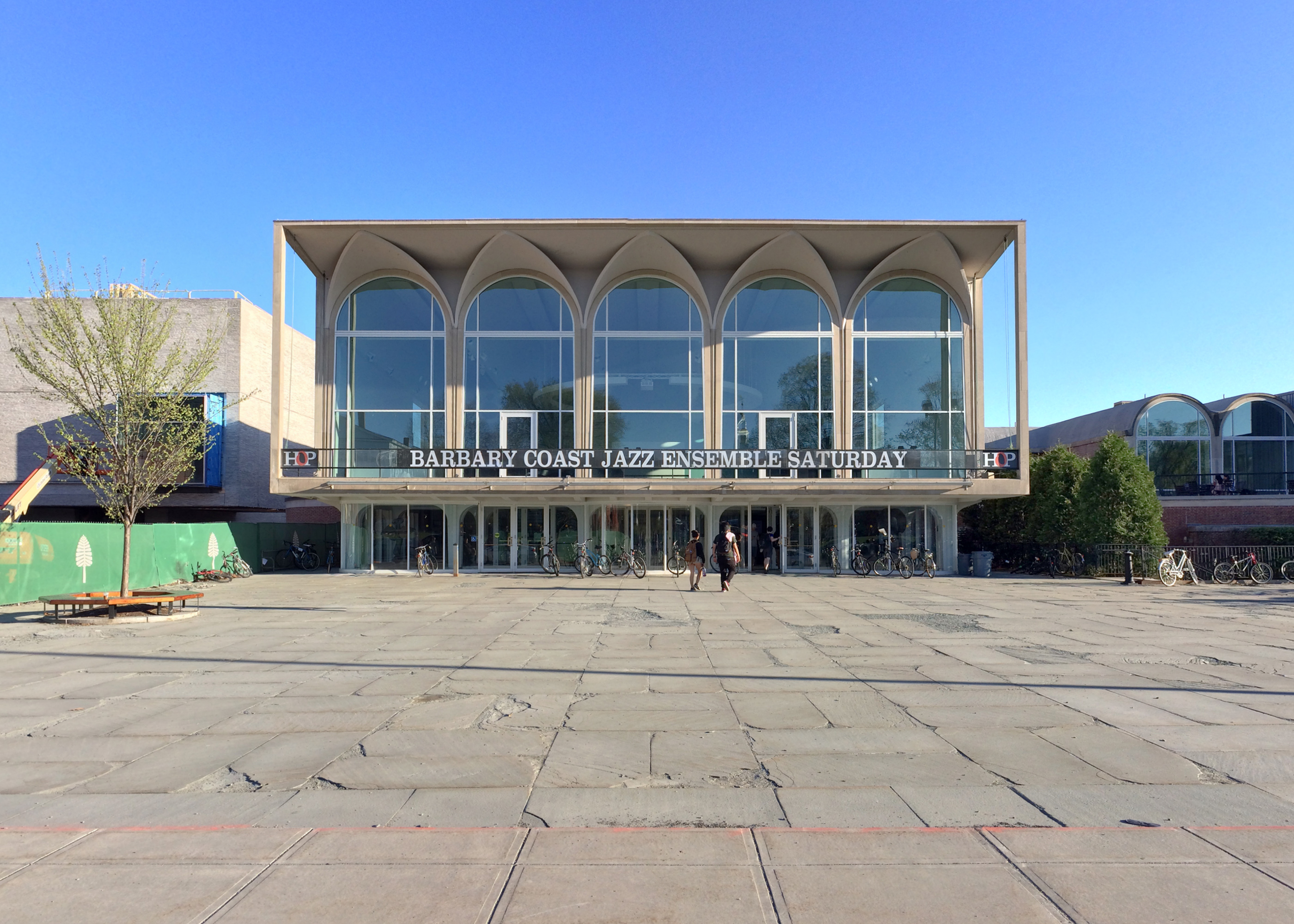
- Interactive map of Hopkins Center
- Location: 4 East Wheelock Street; Hanover, NH
- Type: Performing arts center

Construction
- Opened: 1962

Website
- hop.dartmouth.edu

Hopkins Center for the Arts is a multi-venue performing arts center at Dartmouth College in Hanover, New Hampshire. The center, which was designed by Wallace Harrison and foreshadows his later design of Manhattan's Lincoln Center, is the college's cultural hub. It is home to the drama and music departments. In addition to these fields, the Hopkins Center, or the "Hop" as it is called by students, has a woodshop and jewelry studio which are open for use by students and the public.

== Features ==
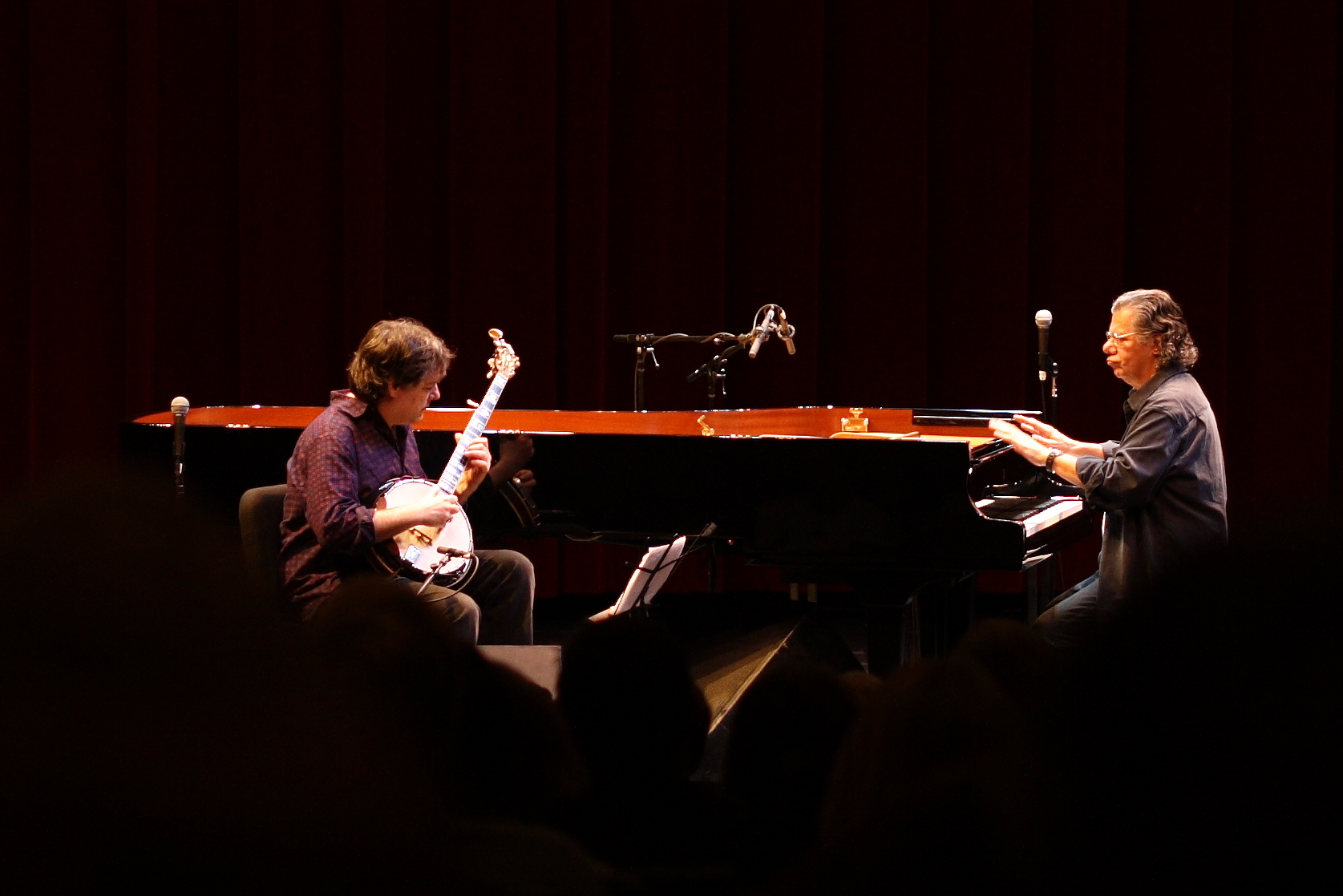
Béla Fleck and Chick Corea, March 1, 2008, Spaulding Auditorium

Within the Hopkins Center are Faulkner Recital Hall, Spaulding Auditorium, Warner Bentley Theater, the Moore Theater, and Alumni Hall. These are used for student performances, concerts and plays by visiting artists, and alumni and faculty meetings. Various student groups perform regularly at the Hop, including the Dartmouth College Gospel Choir, Dartmouth Dance Ensemble, the Glee Club, the Barbary Coast Jazz Ensemble, the Wind Symphony, and the Symphony Orchestra, among others. Students receive a reduced ticket price for performances. However, all events are open to the public. Tickets can be purchased at the Hop's box office.

The center makes available several classes each term for the enrichment of students and the public. For example, the dance department usually offers classes in different styles of dance, from ballet to hip hop.

The Hop was also home to the college's Hinman Mail Center, before being moved to the basement of the nearby Class of 1953 Commons. Each undergraduate student receives his or her own mailbox, known as a "Hinman Box" or "HB", at the beginning of freshman year. Packages may be sent to the mail center as well.

Among the many artists and groups featured in the 2014 season were renowned musician Reggie Watts and virtuoso American violinist Joshua Bell.

=== "Top of the Hop" ===
On special occasions, events are held at the "Top of the Hop", an area on the second floor of the center. The college's president often holds catered events here to celebrate various visitors, donors, exhibits, or performances.

== History ==
When the Hopkins Center opened in 1962, it was the first academic (or civic) arts center of its kind, and as such, it served as the prototype for an entire generation of such centers that has grown to encompass many hundreds over the succeeding half century. Its genesis was the promise for a new theater made in the late 1920s by then Dartmouth president Ernest Martin Hopkins to Warner Bentley, a newly recruited English faculty member with responsibility for the non-department theatre program. Various calamities intervened—the Depression, the Second World War, Korea, and Hopkins' own retirement. But when the building finally reached the construction stage in the favorable economic climate of the early 1960s, its concept had grown to include space for a new concert hall / film theater, a "black box" theater, music and theatre rehearsal halls, a recital hall, gallery exhibition and art storage space, arts studios, and a student workshop — and its new footprint covered four and a half acres.

An early architect's rendering revealed a building of Georgian-style brick, matching much of the rest of the Dartmouth campus. But with the engagement of architect Wallace K. Harrison, a favorite of Dartmouth graduate and New York's then-governor Nelson A. Rockefeller, the style moved to 1960s modern, and the arched and glassed-in front façade took on aspects that Harrison drew upon when he later designed the new Metropolitan Opera House at Lincoln Center.

The arts were not new to Dartmouth at the time. A student theatre company, the Glee Club, Handel Society Chorus, Community Symphony Orchestra, Dartmouth Film Society, and artist-in-residence programs all pre-existed—but the thought was that students would need to be drawn into the arts activity housed within the center. So, integral to its concept was the use of internal glass. Large windows looked into the theaters and design shops, practice rooms, art studios, and galleries — many of which proved impractical given the activity occurring within.

Public programs initiated by its first director, Warner Bentley, and his successor, Peter D. Smith, drew significant media coverage and made the Hopkins Center a regional and sometimes national destination. For a number of years in the mid- and late 1960s, the Hop hosted a summer Congregation of the Arts, which featured summer theatre programs, a festival orchestra and resident chamber ensembles that performed works by distinguished contemporary composers invited to residencies, exhibitions of works by artists-in-residents, and special film series. The Hop earned a reputation as a venue friendly to contemporary music that persisted for nearly two decades. In the 1970s it also initiated and hosted Celebration Northeast, an indoor / outdoor festival that was one of the first to celebrate indigenous but non–mainstream North America folk musics.

For many years the Hop remained ahead of the curve in its programming of imported events, and Peter Smith liked to joke that he was the only impresario who could fail to sell out a 900-seat hall for either Luciano Pavarotti or Bruce Springsteen — both of whom were engaged just prior to their super-stardom.

== Connections ==
The Hopkins Center is connected to the Hood Museum of Art, North America's oldest museum in continuous operation. This is Dartmouth's own museum, which houses both permanent collections and visiting exhibitions. After a walk through the museum, one can visit the Hood's museum store which is located next to the Courtyard Café. Beneath the museum is Gilman Auditorium, which regularly had movie showings before the opening of Loew Auditorium in the Black Family Visual Arts Center next door.
