= Sonia Orwell =

British editor and archivist (1918–1980)

- Born: Sonia Mary Brownell; 25 August 1918; Ranchi, Bihar and Orissa Province, British India
- Died: 11 December 1980 (aged 62); London, England
- Occupations: Editor; archivist
- Known for: The Orwell Archive
- Spouses: George Orwell (m. 1949; died 1950); Michael Pitt-Rivers (m. 1958; div. 1965)
- Relatives: Richard Blair (adoptive stepson)

Sonia Mary Orwell (née Brownell, 25 August 1918 – 11 December 1980) was a British editor and archivist. She was the second wife of Eric Arthur Blair, commonly known by his pen name George Orwell. Born in British India, Brownell's family moved to London, where she was educated at Sacred Heart Convent in Roehampton. In her twenties, she became involved with the founders of the Euston Road School, as model for William Coldstream, Victor Pasmore and Claude Rogers.

She met Orwell while working at the literary magazine, Horizon. After the death of his wife, Eileen Blair, when Orwell was dying from tuberculosis, they married in hospital on 13 October 1949. Their marriage lasted for three months until his death. As his sole heir and literary executor, Brownell was protective of his estate for years after his death. She established the George Orwell Archive at University College London in 1960. With Ian Angus, she edited The Collected Essays, Journalism and Letters of George Orwell in 1968. Brownell is believed to be the model for Julia, the heroine of Nineteen Eighty-Four.

== Early life ==
Brownell was born on 25 August 1918 at Mesra Thaua, in Ranchi, British India, the daughter of Charles Neville Brownell (1882–1918), a Calcutta freight broker, and Beatrice Edith Binning (1890–1959). Her father died in a suspected suicide when she was four months old. Her older sister, Beatrice (known as Bay) was deeply affected by the loss at the age of four. Following his burial in Calcutta, the family sailed back to England to be with their relations. On 5 January 1920, her mother married Edgar Geoffrey Dixon (1880–1953), a chartered accountant. The family returned to Calcutta, where they lived at 1 Old Ballygunge Road, Mayfair. A younger half brother, Michael, was born in 1921.

Brownell was raised as a Roman Catholic and at the age of six was sent to boarding school from 1 September 1924 at the Sacred Heart Convent in Roehampton, London (now part of Roehampton University), which she despised. She hated the nuns who ran the school, felt deeply lonely, and was held in contempt by other students. By 1924, Dixon's alcoholism made him abusive and put a strain on the family. Brownell was taken out of boarding school. In 1927, Dixon's drinking ruined his career when he was thrown out of the Calcutta Club and had to resign. The family moved to Liverpool, England and Brownell was sent back to boarding school. In 1930, Bay left school and the marriage broke up. Her mother earned money by managing boarding houses.

She left school in the summer of 1935, after winning a school leaver's prize for an essay she wrote titled "Man is a Builder". Her mother sent her, at the age of 17, to Neuchâtel, Switzerland to take courses at the college in French literature and language. There Brownell was involved in a tragic accident, while staying with a Protestant pastor and his daughter, Madeleine. She went sailing with Madeleine and two Swiss boys when the boat overturned due to a squall. The other teenagers were unable to swim and drowned. Brownell attempted to save the remaining boy, but he struggled and pulled her down with him, so that she had to struggle free and was unable to save him. Afterwards she blamed herself for his death, telling her half-brother, Michael, that she had held him under the water. In the summer of 1936, she returned to London, due to being affected by the tragedy.

== Euston Road School ==
After learning French in Switzerland, she took a secretarial course. She moved into a flat in Fitzrovia, London, where she socialised with Caitlin Macnamara and Vivien John. In the summer of 1938, she travelled around Eastern Europe with her new friends, Serge Konovalov, who would become professor of Russian at the University of Oxford, and Eugène Vinaver. They spent the holiday travelling by car around Yugoslavia, Bulgaria, Romania and Poland. Vinaver helped her to pay her rent by offering her a typing job, which involved transcribing and editing the copy text for the first edition of the Winchester Le Morte d'Arthur. Her London flat was located in an artists' neighbourhood, so her long blonde hair was quickly noticed by the local artists like Lawrence Gowing. She became the model for the founders of the Euston Road School, William Coldstream, Victor Pasmore and Claude Rogers, and became friends with artists such as Francis Bacon and Lucian Freud. She was introduced to the school by Adrian Stokes, with whom she had a three week affair and after, had a relationship with Pasmore. The painters nicknamed her the Euston Road Venus.

In April 1939, she went to Paris with four artist friends, Graham Bell, Olivier Popham, Rodrigo Moynihan and his wife, Elinor Bellingham-Smith. After returning to London, Brownell became close friends with Coldstream just after her 21st birthday in August 1939. On 3 September, war with Germany was declared. The Euston Road School closed and she went to live with the Moynihans at Monksbury, Hertfordshire, where she taught their son, Rodrigo. Coldstream courted her and she visited him secretly in London in December where they continued their relationship. She took a job teaching the son of a wealthy family in Hampstead and found a room in Goodge Street. Coldstream completed a portrait of Brownell at the studio of Vanessa Bell at 8 Fitzroy Square. By the late 1930s, she had renounced being a Roman Catholic.

== Literary career ==
Sonia Brownell (front) working at the literary magazine Horizon

Through Coldstream she met Stephen Spender and Cyril Connolly, who were the co-editors of the literary magazine Horizon, and also the arts benefactor Peter Watson. Brownell made a proposal to them for the contents of an issue about young artists, but in April 1940, they turned it down. In the spring and summer of 1940, she continued to help at the magazine while searching for work. In July 1940, she was employed at a mobile first aid unit and from early September, when bombs began falling on London, she worked with rescue crews recovering survivors. She accepted a marriage proposal from Coldstream but broke off the engagement and their affair was ended by spring 1941. She worked as a secretary for John Lehmann in 1941 and at the Ministry of War Transport. In 1945, she returned to Horizon as an editorial secretary and acted as working partner for Connolly in his absence. Connolly and Watson often left her in charge of running the magazine and there she developed a reputation for having a difficult temperament. Brownell's biographer and friend, Hilary Spurling, wrote that this criticism was the result of her "trespassing on traditionally masculine critical and intellectual preserves".

Brownell worked as an editor for Weidenfeld and Nicolson from 1951 to 1956, where she was involved in publishing Saul Bellow, Nigel Dennis, Elizabeth Hardwick, Dan Jacobson, and Mary McCarthy. In 1962, she organised the Writers' Conference at the Edinburgh Festival. In 1964 and 1965 she worked in Paris as co-editor of Art and Literature. In 1966, she translated Days in the Trees, by Marguerite Duras, for the Royal Shakespeare Company.

== Marriage to George Orwell ==
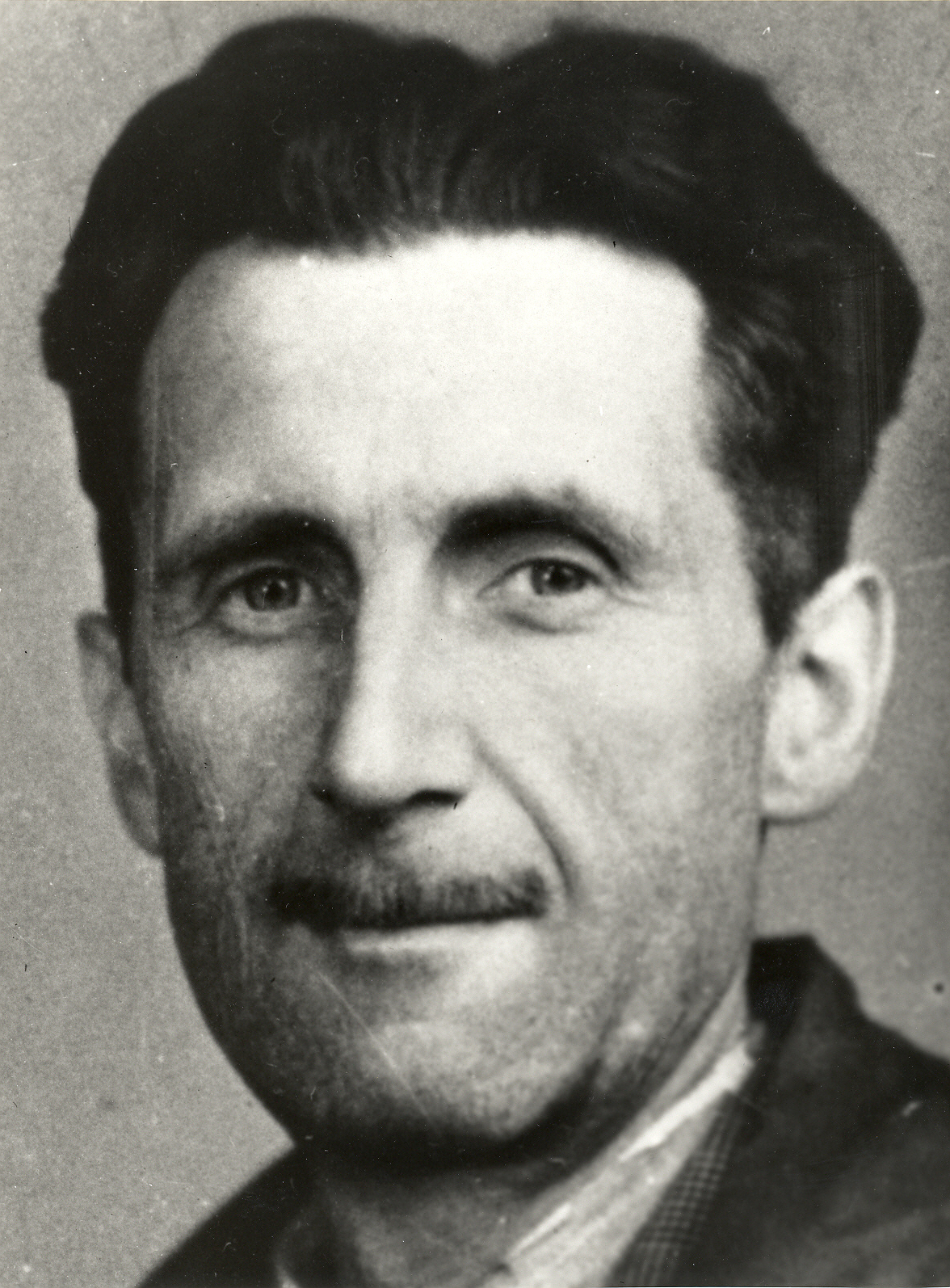
Brownell married George Orwell at his hospital bed in University College Hospital on 13 October 1949

Brownell first met George Orwell while working at Horizon, as Connolly was a friend of his from Eton College. After the death of his first wife Eileen Blair, Orwell became desperately lonely. Brownell met him again in 1946 and offered to help care for his adopted son, Richard Blair. This led to a brief affair and a proposal of marriage, which Brownell rejected. Orwell then went to the island of Jura, where he wrote Nineteen Eighty-Four. In the winter of 1946-7 she met him in London and gave him a bottle of brandy to take back to Jura. There he wrote her an invitation to visit the island, but she did not visit. She spent her time in Paris, socialising with the existentialists Jean-Paul Sartre, Simone de Beauvoir, Albert Camus and Maurice Merleau-Ponty. With Merleau-Ponty she engaged in a turbulent affair, which he broke up in late 1948. When she met Orwell again, he was dying from tuberculosis and she made visits to him in hospital. He proposed marriage to her again and this time she accepted. On 13 October 1949, they married. The wedding took place at Orwell's hospital bed in University College Hospital and afterwards the wedding celebration continued at The Ritz without the groom. Three months later Orwell was dead.

On the night that Orwell died, Brownell had left the hospital and received the news of his death by telephone. Michael Shelden and Jeffrey Meyers, two American biographers, claimed that she was "nightclubbing in Soho" at the time with her former lover Lucian Freud. Spurling discredited this, stating that she spent the evening with Freud and his lover Anne Dunn, who had persuaded her to go to a bar in Percy Street where Brownell lived. There she had been discussing with Freud and Dunn the prospect of moving Orwell to a Swiss sanatorium. The move by air ambulance to the sanatorium at Montana-Vermala was booked for 25 January 1950. Seven days before, Orwell changed his will, making his wife his sole heir and his literary executor with Richard Rees. He died on 21 January 1950. After Brownell learned the news of his death, Natasha Spender said that she was inconsolable for several weeks. Spender commented: "When he died, it was cataclysmic. She had persuaded herself she loved him intellectually, for his writings, but she found she really loved him."

Orwell's friends and biographers have noted that Brownell helped him through the painful last months of his life and, according to Anthony Powell, cheered him up greatly. Others have argued that she may have been attracted to him primarily because of his fame. Their marriage shocked Orwell's friends. David Astor commented, "Orwell was totally unfit to marry anyone. He was scarcely alive". Malcolm Muggeridge described the marriage as "slightly macabre and incomprehensible". Ian Angus said that Brownell's marriage to Orwell "had to do with her own deep unhappiness". She had been devastated by her relationship with Merleau-Ponty, whom she described as her true love. Several years later she confided to Spurling, "He said he would get better if I married him, so you see I had no choice".

After his death, Orwell's will made her a joint guardian of his adopted son, Richard, alongside Orwell's sister Avril. Although Brownell only saw Richard rarely while he was raised by Avril in Scotland, she ensured that his allowance and financial fees were paid.

== Literary executor and archivist ==
Following Orwell's death, Brownell was protective of his estate. She appointed Robin Dalton as representative of Orwell's theatrical rights. Together they assessed requests to adapt Orwell's work, such as a script proposed by Melvyn Bragg, which Brownell rejected.

Soon after her husband's death, she sold the film rights to Animal Farm to a pair of movie executives, unaware they were agents of the American Central Intelligence Agency (CIA). The CIA's Office of Policy Coordination sent Carleton Alsop and Finis Farr, two members of their Psychological Warfare Workshop staff to obtain the rights. Brownell agreed after they offered to arrange a meeting with Clark Gable. This deal resulted in the creation of the propaganda film Animal Farm (1954), which became the first feature-length animated film made in Britain.

Orwell requested in his will that no biography should be written of his life and Brownell spent years trying to enforce his wishes, causing tension with prospective biographers. Various accounts were published by the end of the 1950s, including works by Laurence Brander and John Atkins. She appointed Malcolm Muggeridge as official biographer, but he did not complete a finished work. She later appointed Bernard Crick as biographer, who produced George Orwell: A Biography in late 1980.

Together with David Astor and Richard Rees, she established the George Orwell Archive at University College London in 1960. In 1968, she edited, with Angus, The Collected Essays, Journalism and Letters of George Orwell.

Brownell continued to resist almost all requests to adapt Orwell's novels. In November 1973, the English musician David Bowie told William Burroughs about his intention to adapt Nineteen Eighty-Four to television as a rock musical. When Brownell refused to give him permission, he was furious, describing her to Ben Edmonds of Circus as "the biggest upper-class snob I've ever met in my life".

Brownell worked with the Information Research Department (IRD), a propaganda department of the British Foreign Office, which helped to increase the international fame of Animal Farm and Nineteen Eighty-Four. With her support, the IRD was able to translate Animal Farm into over 16 languages, and for British embassies to disseminate the book in over 14 countries for propaganda purposes.

== Marriage to Michael Pitt-Rivers ==
Brownell married Michael Pitt-Rivers in 1958. He was a practising homosexual and had earlier been convicted in a public trial. They were married at Kensington Registry Office on 12 August. A second wedding party was held in Paris in 1959. Afterwards, they toured South-East Asia on board SS Cambodge. The four-month voyage caused the couple to become more distant to each other by the time they returned to his home at Tollard Royal. Their union was a mariage blanc. Her mother, Beatrice, died at the end of December 1959. Brownell was deeply unhappy in her marriage and took an overdose, causing her to spend two days in Salisbury Hospital. She left Tollard Royal a year later and stayed with the Moynihans for two months in Provence. The continuation of the marriage caused her to drink heavily and take another overdose in spring 1961. Her marriage to Pitt-Rivers ended in divorce in 1965. Afterwards, Pitt-Rivers bought her a house in South Kensington.

== Other relationships ==
Brownell had several godchildren and was very close to some of them. Her godson Tom Gross wrote in The Spectator magazine that "although Sonia had no children of her own, she became almost like a second mother to me." She was also close friends with many writers and artists, including Pablo Picasso, who drew a sketch in her honour, which he marked "Sonia". Brownell's circle of friends included J. R. Ackerley, W. H. Auden, Francis Bacon, Ivy Compton-Burnett, Michel Leiris, and Angus Wilson. Angus commented that she was often "bossy", "presumptuous" and "noisy", but Stephen Spender described her as a "warm-hearted, generous, spontaneous person". She provided financial support to Jean Rhys and, in 1975, raised more than £40,000 for Connolly's widow after he died in debt.

== Legal battle ==
Brownell launched a High Court legal case in 1979 against Jack Harrison, who was a senior partner at Orwell's accountancy firm. Orwell had contacted Harrison's firm and was advised to set up a company in order to receive the royalties from his work and own the copyright. George Orwell Productions Ltd (GOP Ltd) was established on 12 September 1947. In September 1949, Harrison took control of the company by claiming that Orwell had asked him at his hospital bed to take the position of director. Although Brownell was named as one of the company directors, Harrison executed a service agreement, which passed ownership of the copyright to the company. Harrison also claimed, in the absence of witnesses, that Orwell had offered him 25% of the shares in GOP. Due to her grief, Brownell had left Harrison in charge of managing GOP. In 1958, Harrison transferred 75% of the stock to himself. In 1977, he told Brownell that all of the income from Orwell's works had been absorbed in tax and advised her to move to Paris. When Brownell's lawyers demanded to see the business accounts, it revealed that GOP had lost £100,000 in stock market investments. In 1979, she took Harrison and GOP to the High Court, but in the spring of 1980, she moved to Spurling's flat in London in poor health. Eventually the case was settled out of court on 24 November 1980. Brownell paid Harrison to retrieve the literary rights to Orwell's work. Spurling commented that, "he deprived her of what she had to get back what she should have had".

== Death ==
Brownell died penniless in St. Stephen's Hospital, London of a brain tumour on 11 December 1980, due to spending her remaining money paying Harrison for the literary rights and the legal fees in the lawsuit. She left the rights to Orwell's work to his son, Richard. Her friend, the painter Francis Bacon, paid her debts. She was buried on 18 December 1980 at Putney Vale Cemetery. At her funeral, Tom Gross read the same passage from Ecclesiastes, chapter 12 verses 1–7 about the breaking of the golden bowl, that she had asked Anthony Powell to read at Orwell's funeral thirty years earlier.

== Influence on Orwell's work ==
T. R. Fyvel, who was a colleague and friend of Orwell during the last decade of the writer's life, and other friends of Orwell, have said that Brownell was the model for Julia, the heroine of Nineteen Eighty-Four, the "girl from the fiction department" who engages in an affair with Winston Smith. Orwell biographer Bernard Crick disagreed, telling The Washington Post he did not think that Brownell "had much influence on his life" and commented that "it was more or less an accident that they married." Another biographer, D. J. Taylor, acknowledged some similarities between Brownell and Julia, but held the opinion that Julia was instead a composite of several women in Orwell's life.

== In popular culture ==
In 2017, Brownell was portrayed by Cressida Bonas opposite Peter Hamilton Dyer as Orwell in a play titled Mrs Orwell at the Old Red Lion Theatre, London. It then transferred to the Southwark Playhouse.
