= Edgar Hubert =

English painter

- Born: Norman Edgar Hubert; 1 June 1906; Billingshurst, West Sussex, England
- Died: 25 January 1985 (aged 78); Seaford, East Sussex, England
- Education: Reading School of Art; Slade School of Fine Art
- Known for: Painting

Edgar Hubert (1 June, 1906 – 25 January, 1985) was a British abstract painter.

== Biography ==
Born Norman Edgar Hubert on 1 June, 1906, in Billingshurst, West Sussex, he spent his boyhood in Clevedon, Somerset. He studied art at the Reading School of Art (now University of Reading) and, from 1926 to 1929, at the Slade School of Fine Art. Henry Tonks was one of his tutors at the Slade and he shared rooms with William Townsend (who wrote of Hubert in his journals and other papers) during his time there. In the late 1930s, due to ill health, Hubert left London to live with his family in Beaconsfield, Buckinghamshire. He was deeply affected by the deaths, between 1936 and 1947, of his father and two brothers between 1936 and 1947. He continued to live with his mother until her death around 1960; he then moved to Seaford, East Sussex. Hubert's lifelong shyness and introversion contributed to a neglect of his work in histories of twentieth century British art. When his close friend and colleague Geoffrey Tibble died in 1952, Hubert became reclusive and withdrew from the art world. Hubert continued to paint until shortly before his death on 25 January, 1985.

Chris Stephens describes Edgar Hubert as having produced 'some of this country's most radical abstract paintings of the 1930s'.

== Style ==
Hubert's early work was figurative, developing into both abstract and semi-figurative styles. Between 1933 and 1936, Hubert was a significant figure in the Objective Abstraction movement with Graham Bell, William Coldstream, Rodrigo Moynihan and Geoffrey Tibble. Hubert's 'Painting 1935-6' at the Tate is from this period. Many of the artists involved in Objective Abstraction went on to be part of the realist Euston Road School but Hubert continued to work in both abstract and semi-figurative styles.

Influenced by Surrealism and geometric abstraction, his wartime paintings were of post-Cubist figures and abstractions of geometrical linear patterns. His later paintings included more organic forms, together with geometric patterns (several in black and white).

== Exhibitions ==
In 1930, Hubert exhibited in the First Exhibition of the Young Painters Society, New Burlington Galleries. Between 1931 and 1947, Hubert regularly exhibited with the London Group. In 1942 his work was shown at the Lefevre Gallery, in 1946 at the London Gallery and the Anglo-French Art Centre, and in 1948 and 1953 at the Mayor Gallery. He had one-person exhibitions at the Mayor Gallery in 1946 and in 1948. Also in 1948, with encouragement from Lawrence Alloway, Hubert submitted his work to the Institute of Contemporary Arts (ICA) exhibition 40 Years of Modern Art 1907-1947. In 1958, the ICA held a one-person exhibition Paintings by Edgar Hubert. In Paris, his work was shown at the British Council's La Jeune Peinture en Grande Bretagne (1948) and the Salon des Réalités Nouvelles (1949). Hubert was included in the exhibition British Art and the Modern Movement 1930-40 held by the National Museum of Wales Cardiff in 1962.

The Fine Art Society exhibition Edgar Hubert 1906-1985 was held in 2005, reviving interest in his work. In 2014, one of Hubert's works was acquired by the Jerwood Foundation for the Jerwood Collection of 20th and 21st century British art.
