= Maurice Feild =

English painter

E. Maurice Feild (1905–1988) was an English painter and teacher, a close associate of the Euston Road School, and an influential teacher at the Downs School, Colwall, and the Slade School of Art.

== Career ==
He began his career at the Downs School in 1928. He was a colleague and friend of W. H. Auden in the early 1930s. In 1937 he was an early supporter of the Euston Road School. He encouraged his pupils to paint with direct sincerity in the open air, and the many English painters who learned from him included Kenneth Rowntree, Lawrence Gowing, Andrew Forge, Patrick George, Anthony Hill, Anthony Fry, and Francis Hoyland.

He left the Downs School to join the Slade School in 1954 at the invitation of William Coldstream, who later wrote a tribute to Feild's work as painter and teacher. His work was exhibited at the Upper Grosvenor Gallery in 1970.

Lawrence Gowing was reported to have described Feild as "among the unsung influences on British painting" (Roger Berthoud in The Times, 12 June 1982, p. 12).

In 2010, a collection of Feild's paintings went on display for the first time in 20 years; after being discovered in a cupboard at the Downs School, presently Malvern College's prep school, by Alastair Cook, head of the school.

"I was amazed to find these wonderful works soon after my appointment last year. We were thrilled to discover so many examples of this master - in both senses of the word - and are delighted to be showcasing his work once again in an exhibition that is long overdue. I only hope it rekindles interest in his remarkable legacy to British art, as he deserves." - Alastair Cook

== Personal life ==
He was married to Alexandra Feild. They had one son, John Feild, a music teacher and musician.
