= Margaret Mellis =

British artist (1914–2009)

Margaret Nairne Mellis
- Born: 21 January 1914; Wukingfu (Wujingfu), Swatow, China
- Died: 17 March 2009 (aged 95)
- Education: Edinburgh College of Art
- Known for: Abstract art
- Spouses: Adrian Stokes, m.1938-1946, divorced; Francis Davison, m.1948-1984, his death.

Margaret Nairne Mellis (22 January 1914 – 17 March 2009) was a Scottish artist, one of the early members and last survivors of the group of modernist artists that gathered in St Ives, in Cornwall, in the 1940s. She and her first husband, Adrian Stokes, played an important role in the rise of St Ives as a magnet for artists. She later married Francis Davison, also an artist, and became a mentor to the young Damien Hirst.

== Life ==
Mellis was born in Wukingfu (Wujingfu), Swatow, China, where her father was a Presbyterian missionary. Her family returned to East Lothian when she was one year old, shortly after the First World War broke out, so her father David Barclay Mellis-Smith could join up.

Abandoning an initial interest in music, she studied at Edinburgh College of Art from 1930 to 1934 under the Scottish Colourist Samuel Peploe and the landscape painters William Gillies and John Maxwell, alongside Wilhelmina Barns-Graham and William Gear. She used a travel scholarship to study with André Lhote in Paris. She met the art critic Adrian Stokes in 1936 and they married in 1938. They visited Ezra Pound in Italy during their honeymoon and returned to London, where she studied at the Euston Road School.

Looking for a refuge from London before the Second World War broke out, they moved to a house, Little Parc Owles, in Carbis Bay, near St Ives, in 1939. The couple's move to Cornwall was to be a catalyst for the burgeoning modernist movement that was to become internationally renowned throughout the middle of the 20th century. They were soon joined by Margaret's 17 year old sister Ann Stokes, their friends Ben Nicholson and Barbara Hepworth and their triplets, and Naum Gabo and his wife Miriam Gabo, and then subsequently Margaret's college friend Wilhelmina Barns-Graham. Margaret was encouraged to paint small abstract works, and to produce intricate collage. She was inspired by the naïve painter Alfred Wallis. Her son, Telfer, was born in October 1940.

Other visitors included Victor Pasmore, Graham Sutherland, William Coldstream, Julian Trevelyan and Peter Lanyon, and later a second wave including Roger Hilton, Patrick Heron, Terry Frost and Bryan Wynter.

Mellis left the St Ives area in 1946 after the breakdown of her marriage. Mellis and Stokes divorced in 1946, and he subsequently married her younger sister the ceramic artist Ann Stokes. Patrick Heron introduced Mellis to the painter Francis Davison, also recently divorced; they married in 1948 and lived for two years in the run-down Château des Enfants on the Cap d'Antibes. They moved to Walberswick in 1950, later moving to a smallholding at Syleham, near Diss. After 25 years of relative isolation and self-sufficiency, broken occasionally by visiting artist friends, they moved to Southwold in 1976, where she began to create driftwood sculptures.

Francis Davison died from a brain tumour in 1984. Margaret Mellis died in 2009 and was survived by her son, three grandchildren, and four great-grandchildren.

== Art ==
Mellis was renowned throughout her career as a colourist. While in St Ives under the influence of Nicholson she began to work in relief and collage, most notably Collage with Red Triangle II (1940) which was initially a gift for Naum Gabo and is now in the collection of the Victoria and Albert Museum.

The breakdown of her first marriage caused her to reject abstraction for a period, returning to representational painting. However, works from the mid-1950s moved away from direct representation, simplifying still life and landscapes to flattened areas of pure colour. By the 1970s work was almost totally abstract and focused on geometric shape and colour.

In 1980 Mellis started making constructions out of found pieces of driftwood, which was to become her central practice until the end of her career. Whilst still retaining elements of representation, these works were more closely concerned with the relationship between form and colour. During the 1990s, Mellis became an early mentor and friend to the YBA artist Damien Hirst.

She exhibited infrequently through much of her life, and Hirst considers that her work has been unduly neglected. A major exhibition was held at Newlyn Art Gallery in 2001, and in 2008 a documentary Margaret Mellis a Life in Colour was made to accompany a major retrospective exhibition of her work at the Sainsbury Centre for Visual Arts in Norwich. In 2011 her work featured as a major part of the Tate St Ives Summer Exhibition, alongside Martin Creed and Agnes Martin. Her work is featured in major collections such as the Tate Gallery, the Victoria and Albert Museum, the Arts Council Collection, The Fleming Collection, City Art Centre, Edinburgh and the National Galleries of Scotland.

In 2023 her work was included in the exhibition Action, Gesture, Paint: Women Artists and Global Abstraction 1940-1970 at the Whitechapel Gallery in London.
