= Kenneth Gribble =

English artist and educator

Kenneth Gribble (1925–1995) was an English artist and educator, known for his post-war landscape paintings of British towns and cities.

== Biography ==
Gribble was born in the Sparkbrook area of Birmingham, England. He lived in this industrial city in the West Midlands until the age of fourteen when his family were forced to move to Hinckley in Leicestershire to escape World War II bombing raids. In 1943 his family moved to Harrow in Greater London and Gribble soon began studies at Harrow School of Art.

Following his time at Harrow, Gribble became a student at Camberwell School of Art, at this time he was inspired by several tutors particularly John Minton and David Bomberg, the latter teaching him during part-time evening classes. The renowned war artist Randolph Schwabe was an early admirer of Gribble's work and was instrumental in his recruitment to Slade School of Art. From 1947 Gribble studied at Slade where he came under the influence of several members of the Euston Road School of artists, such as William Coldstream and Victor Pasmore.

After graduating from Slade, Gribble took up his first teaching post at Constantine Technical College School of Art in Middlesbrough. Gribble taught in Middlesbrough from 1950 to 1955, his teaching proved a success as numerous students were accepted to major London schools. During his time in Middlesbrough, he produced many oil paintings of the town and the surrounding industrial landscapes of Teesside. The art historian Peter Davies described one of these paintings, 'Cheetham Street' as 'Superb', adding 'This picture illustrates the frenzied rush of figures, eager to get home to a cup of tea, spilling out of factories in the Grangetown area of Middlesbrough.' The picture is part of the Middlesbrough Institute of Modern Art (MIMA) collection.

In 1955, Gribble became principal of Ashton-Under-Lyne School of Art, here he established himself as a leading exponent of Northern English industrial landscape painting. Davies described his 1958 painting 'Park Parade, Ashton' as 'A powerful study in perspective, in which street, pavement, and two canals are marshalled in diminishing parallel lines... the empty streets to the right, evoke a desolate mood of stagnation and inertia... The sheer sophistication and panache of this underrated artist's technique is belied by apparently bland, infertile subject matter that would prove anathema to many lesser artists'.

In 1960 he became principal of Lincoln School of Art, here Gribble continued his practice of painting his local environment, notably with his 'Steep Hill' painting which is part of the Usher Gallery collection in Lincoln. The piece was selected for the gallery's 2023 Community Choice exhibition, the exhibition was co-curated by gallery staff and five local community organisations. The painting is another example of Gribbles' masterful use of perspective. The view down Steep Hill depicts the former Henequin Inn, a 15th Century half-timbered building with Danesgate leading away to the left.

After leaving Lincoln, Gribble took up principalships at Taunton College of Art and later at Maidstone College of Art. He was a member of the Manchester Academy of Fine Art where he has exhibited on many occasions. His other exhibitions have included The Royal Academy, Beaux Arts Gallery, Walker Art Gallery, Leeds Art Gallery, Manchester Art Gallery, Salford Art Gallery, The Usher Gallery (Lincoln) and Middlesbrough Institute of Modern Art.
