= Anthony Fry (artist) =

British painter (1927–2016)

- Born: Anthony Lewis Matthew Fry; 6 June 1927; Theydon Bois, Essex, England
- Died: 5 November 2016 (aged 89); Wiltshire, England
- Education: Edinburgh College of Art, Camberwell School of Arts and Crafts
- Known for: Painting, Teaching

Anthony Fry (6 June 1927 – 5 November 2016) was a British figurative painter and teacher.

== Early life ==
Fry was born on 6 June 1927 in Theydon Bois, Essex, to Dr Lewis Salisbury Fry (1898–1968) and Margaret Mary Fry (1898–1986). Dr Fry was a descendant of the Quaker founders of the Bristol-based chocolate business J.S. Fry & Sons.

Fry attended The Downs School, where he was taught English by the poet W.H. Auden and painting by the artist Maurice Feild. He completed his secondary education at Bryanston where he was taught sculpture by Donald Potter and painting by Elizabeth Muntz.

Fry went on to study painting at Edinburgh College of Art and Camberwell School of Arts and Crafts under William Coldstream, Victor Pasmore and Lawrence Gowing.

== Career ==
In 1950 Fry won the Prix de Rome for his painting The Betrayal, and with the award a two-year scholarship at the British School at Rome. The school's Director of Fine Art Derek Hill encouraged Fry to travel throughout Italy during his residency. On his return to the UK Fry took up a teaching post at the Bath Academy of Art, then located at Corsham Court in Wiltshire, alongside Terry Frost, Peter Lanyon, William Scott and Howard Hodgkin.

In 1957 Fry achieved early success at The Leicester Galleries in London with a series of large canvasses of dancing figures which the art historian and critic John Russell described in the book Private View as "one of the most individual achievements of British painting in the 1950s".

From 1961 to 1963 a Harkness Fellowship took Fry to the United States where he was greatly influenced by the American Abstract Impressionists, notably Mark Rothko and Morris Louis.

Throughout the 1970s and 1980s Fry taught painting at Chelsea School of Art. During this period he made several long painting trips to Malta, Spain and Morocco and showed his work regularly at exhibitions in London.

From 1982 to 1983 Fry was the recipient of the Lorne Fellowship.

In 1994 Fry began working on a large body of work of paintings inspired by a visit to southern India. For the next twelve years he would spend the winters in Fort Cochin, Kerala.

In an essay entitled 'A Certain Tradition of Heat', John Berger wrote: "Fry's pictures – like all good visual art – defy words. With words we cannot get nearer to them than a map can get to a landscape. We can enter them only with our eyes. Once within them, the eyes may tell the skin something. Once within, the eyes may see even with the eyelids shut."

Fry was interviewed extensively about his life by Cathy Courtney for the Artists Lives series for the British Library 'National Life Story Collection'.

== Personal life ==
In 1951 Fry married Barbara Harris, who died in 1968. In 1982 he married Sabrina Carver, niece of Michael Carver Field Marshall Lord Carver, former head of the defence staff, and one time secretary to author Alistair Maclean. She died in 2013. He had four children, one of whom is the painter and musician Mark Fry.

Anthony Fry was a first cousin of the Bloomsbury Group painter and critic Roger Fry, and cousin of the painter Sir Howard Hodgkin.

Fry died on 5 November 2016 at his home in Wiltshire.

== Collected works ==
Fry's paintings are held in numerous private and public collections, including the Tate, the Arts Council of Great Britain, the Saatchi Collection, the Stuyvesant Foundation, the Gulbenkian Foundation Collection and the National Gallery of Victoria, Australia.

== Exhibitions ==
- St. Georges Gallery, London 1955 – "First one-man exhibition with William Scott's encouragement"
- Leicester Galleries, London 1957, 1959
- Durlacher Brothers, New York 1961
- Tate Gallery, London 'British Painting in the Sixties' 1963
- Tate Gallery, London 'London Group 1914 – 64 Jubilee Exhibition' 1964
- The New Art Centre, London 1963, 1967, 1970, 1973, 1981
- Browse and Darby, London 1984, 1986, 1991, 1994, 1996 (at the Peter Findlay Gallery, New York, in association with Browse & Darby), 1999, 2005, 2009, 2012
- Barbra Mathes Gallery, New York 2006

=== Retrospective ===
- Holburne Museum, Bath 2018

== Bibliography ==
'Anthony Fry', Published by Umbrage Editions New York, 2001. ISBN 1-884167-06-3. Includes essays on Fry by John Berger, Tom Stoppard, Andrew Lambirth, Bloomsbury Set member Frances Partridge, Bryan Roberston and Cathy Courtney.

'Anthony Fry, Paintings and Works on Paper 2000–2011', Published by Umbrage Editions New York, 2011. ISBN 978-1-884167-140. Foreword by Patrick Kinmonth.
