= Thelma Hulbert =

English visual artist

Thelma Hulbert (1913–1995) was an English visual artist known as a painter of still lives and landscapes. Hulbert was a member of the Euston Road School of artists.

== Biography ==
Thelma Hulbert was born on 10 November 1913 in Bath, Somerset. She was an only child. At a young age she attended the Bath Art School.

In 1934, at the age of 20, Hulbert moved to London. She later became a model, secretary and student with the Euston Road School of artists, which was founded in 1937, and became friends with Victor Pasmore, William Coldstream, and Claude Rogers. Following the Second World War, she moved to the Holland Park neighborhood of London and began to teach art at the Camden School for Girls. She later would teach at the Central School of Art and Design, where she remained until her retirement. In 1958 she had a solo exhibition at the Leicester Galleries in London. In 1962 Hulbert had a mid-career retrospective, entitled Thelma Hulbert: paintings and drawings, 1937-1962, at the Whitechapel Gallery, which was organized by Bryan Robertson.

In 1984 Hulbert moved to Honiton where she lived and painted at Elmfield House. After a battle with pulmonary fibrosis, Hulbert died on 17 February 1995 in Honiton.

== Legacy ==
In April 1998 Elmfield House re-opened as the Thelma Hulbert Gallery, a public art gallery hosting a programme of contemporary art and craft exhibitions alongside a permanent collection of Thelma Hulbert's work. It also has workshops and activities for the community, Learning Room with kids’ art & craft materials, a shop and a garden with sensory planting.

== Public collections ==
Hulbert's work can be found in a number of public collections, including:

- Tate
- Art Gallery of New South Wales
- Royal Albert Memorial Museum
