= Graham Bell (artist) =

English artist

- Portrait of Bell by Geoffrey Tibble
- Born: Frank Graham Bell; 21 November 1910; South Africa
- Died: 9 August 1943 (aged 32); Nottinghamshire, England
- Known for: Painting
- Notable work: The Cafe ( Conte Cafe London)
- Movement: Euston Road School
- Spouse: Anne Bilbrough

Dover Front, 1938, Graham Bell, Tate Britain

Frank Graham Bell (21 November 1910 – 9 August 1943) was a painter of portraits, landscapes and still-life, and a founder member of the realist Euston Road School. He was also a journalist and writer on art and the artist. Born in South Africa, he spent most of his career in Britain (1931–1943), where he died in a flying accident during World War II.

== Biography ==
Frank Graham Bell was born on 21 November 1910 in present-day South Africa, in Durban or Transvaal Province. He had a younger brother, Geoffrey Graham Bell, who also became an artist. He first worked in a bank and on a farm before turning to art. He studied at the Durban Art School, and held his first one-man exhibition at the City Hall in Durban in 1931.

In 1931 he moved to Britain together with Anne Bilbrough, a young actress whom he was later to marry and who was the mother of their only daughter Harriet. At first he was inspired by the work of Duncan Grant; then met William Coldstream. In 1934 under the influence of Geoffrey Tibble he showed non-representational works at the exhibition of Objective Abstractions at the Zwemmer Gallery.

Between 1934 and 1937 Bell abandoned painting and took up journalism. He contributed to the New Statesman and went on to become its arts editor.

Bell took up painting again, and in 1937 along with William Coldstream, Lawrence Gowing, Rodrigo Moynihan, Victor Pasmore and Claude Rogers, became a founder of the Euston Road School. This realist group of painters taught or studied at the school of painting and drawing which they set up at 316 Euston Road in London. They admired a tradition of painting derived from the work of Cézanne, reacting against avant-garde styles and asserting the importance of painting traditional subjects in a realist manner. Their programme was largely based on a political and social intention of creating a widely understandable and socially relevant art. Most members were socialists and some were members of the Communist Party. Many also were recording their times for posterity as part of the Mass Observation movement, but their work was not propagandist in the manner of Socialist Realism. The School was affiliated to the Artists' International Association, and helped artists fleeing from Nazi Germany to resettle and find work.

Brunswick Square, 1940

In 1938 Rosenberg & Helft exhibited Bell's work in a mixed show, along with paintings by Victor Pasmore, Thomas Carr, Claude Rogers, William Coldstream and Geoffrey Tibble. In the same year Bell worked for Mass Observation in Bolton, with Humphrey Spender the photographer. (Their sketchbooks and photographs are conserved by Bolton Museum.)

In 1939 Bell published the pamphlet, The Artist And His Public, and wrote the Plan for Artists with Kenneth Clark, urging patronage for contemporary artists. As a result, several of his contemporaries were able to become artists, whose careers might have ended because of financial necessity.
In 1942 Ernest Brown & Phillips exhibited Bell's work along with paintings by Anthony Devas, Thomas Carr and Lawrence Gowing.

After the outbreak of World War II in 1939, Bell enlisted with the Royal Air Force to be trained as a pilot. In about 1940 he painted some watercolors of Ewenny Priory and other sites in Glamorgan, as part of the 'Recording Britain' scheme, devised by Kenneth Clark and supported by the Pilgrim Trust.

When under his basic training in Wales he suffered a bad break of his leg during a Sunday morning football match. This delay in training meant that he became too old to continue as a pilot and so entered a navigators course. After training in South Africa he returned to UK in early 1943 with the rank of pilot officer. In June he arrived at RAF Ossington the base of 82 OTU. On 9 August 1943 his Wellington bomber plane developed an engine failure near the end of a training flight, the pilot lost control and it crashed near to Newark-on-Trent in Nottinghamshire, killing all the crew – thus ending at the age of 32 what was becoming one of the most sensitive and conscientious artistic careers.

Watercolour view of Llanmihangel Place and St Michael and All Angels church, Victoria and Albert Museum

Before the war and up to his death, Graham Bell was in a relationship with Anne Popham. War time letters to his mother and to Anne Popham are held in the Tate Archive and these indicate his intention to divorce his wife and marry Anne Popham. In the decade after his death, his widow married the art collector Gerald Reitlinger and Anne Popham married the artist Quentin Bell. The similarity of the forenames and surnames of these two women is sometimes the cause for confusion amongst researchers.

In 1960, Harriet Graham Bell, Frank's only daughter, married art collector John Cullis.

After the war Lund Humphries published The Paintings of Graham Bell with an introduction by Sir Kenneth Clark (1947), and the Arts Council of Great Britain included some of Bell's work in their exhibition, The Euston Road School (1948).

== Select paintings ==
- Imogen – Derby Museums & Art Gallery
- Baylham Mill, 1940 – Arts Council collection
- Brunswick Square, London, 1940 – Museums Sheffield
- Old Bridge, Bridgend, Glamorganshire, ca.1940 – Victoria and Albert Museum, London
- Llysworney, Glamorganshire, ca.1940 – Victoria and Albert Museum
- Llannichangel, Glamorganshire, ca. 1940 [sc. Llanmichangel] – Victoria and Albert Museum
- Ewenny Priory, Glamorganshire, ca. 1940 – Victoria and Albert Museum
- Dover Front, 1938 – Tate
- Miss Anne Popham, 1937-8 – Tate
- Miss Pool – Glasgow Museums
- In the fields, 1936
- Head of an Evacuee
- Cows at Rodwell
- The Green Coat, ca.1930
- Portrait of an Elderly Man
- Landscape in Provence

== Writings ==
- The Artist And His Public (1939) [= Hogarth Sixpenny Pamphlets; 5]
