= Elsie Few =

Jamaican-born artist (1909-1980)

- Born: Elsie Evelyn Few; 4 February 1909; Kingston, Jamaica
- Died: 17 December 1980 (aged 71)
- Education: Slade School of Art; Bartlett School of Architecture
- Known for: Painting

Elsie Evelyn Few (4 February 1909 – 17 December 1980) was a Jamaican-born artist, who had a long career in Britain and was associated with the Euston Road School. Throughout her career Few produced oil paintings of landscapes but later in her life began using collage techniques to create abstract designs.

== Biography ==
Few was born in Kingston, Jamaica. She moved to London to study at the Slade School of Art and the Bartlett School of Architecture from 1929 and 1931, before travelling and studying throughout Europe. Few met and worked with artists from the Euston Road School. In 1937 she married Claude Rogers, one of the founding members of the School and together they, along with Victor Pasmore held a joint exhibition at the Burnett Webster Gallery in Kingston, Jamaica, in 1936. Shortly afterwards, Few had her first solo exhibition at the same gallery. Few was elected a member of the London Group in 1943 and from 1945 until 1948 worked for Chatto & Windus as an art editor. In 1948, works by Few were included in the Euston Road School and others exhibition held at the Wakefield City Art Gallery, but not in the subsequent touring version of the exhibition created by the Arts Council. From 1946 until 1969 she headed the art department at the Gipsy Hill College.

Few had a number of notable exhibitions during her career, including at the Whitechapel Art Gallery in 1973 and at the Annexe Gallery in Wimbledon during 1979.

== Legacy ==
A memorial exhibition for Few was held in 1981 at the Bury St Edmunds Art Gallery, which included examples of her ceramics and tapestries alongside her paintings and collages. The Belgrave Gallery held a joint exhibition of works by Rogers and Few in 2002. For many years the couple had lived at Somerton in Suffolk.
