= Objective abstraction =

Objective abstraction was a British art group or movement c. 1933–1936, taking its name from the "Objective Abstractions" exhibition of 1934. It is a misnomer in the sense that a minority of the artists in the exhibition were at that time engaged in abstract painting. The grouping was short-lived, lasting only a few years, with a number of the artists involved later taking part in the Euston Road School of realism.

== History ==
Objective abstraction was a form of abstract art developed by a group of British artists in 1933. Experimentation was prevalent in British art at the time.

The main figures were Graham Bell, William Coldstream, Edgar Hubert, Rodrigo Moynihan and Geoffrey Tibble.

William Townsend told the Tate Gallery that 'the style originated with Geoffrey Tibble in the latter half of 1933. It was immediately taken up by Rodrigo Moynihan [...] and at the same time or shortly after by Edgar Hubert'. According to Townsend, early paintings by the group were derived from external objects but they became increasingly abstract.

The more abstract paintings, that came to represent the movement's style, were created using improvised freely applied brushstrokes.

== Exhibitions ==
In 1934, the exhibition Objective Abstractions was held at the Zwemmer Gallery showing the group's work, except Hubert's. The exhibition catalogue states that Graham Bell, Rodrigo Moynihan, Ceri Richards, Ivon Hitchens, Geoffrey Tibble and Victor Pasmore exhibited paintings.
