= In the Shadow of the Sun =

1981 fantasy short film

- Directed by: Derek Jarman
- Produced by: James Mackay
- Starring: Karl Bowen; Graham Dowie; Christopher Hobbs; Gerald Incandela
- Cinematography: Derek Jarman
- Edited by: Derek Jarman
- Music by: Throbbing Gristle
- Production company: Dark Pictures
- Release date: 1981
- Running time: 54 minutes
- Country: United Kingdom
- Language: English

In the Shadow of the Sun is a 1981 fantasy short film directed by Derek Jarman. It consists of a series of Super 8 films shot between 1972 and 1975 and edited together in 1980. Throbbing Gristle were asked by Jarman to provide the soundtrack, which was recorded in 1980 and released separately in 1984. The film was premiered in February 1981 at the Berlin Film Festival.

== Cast ==
- Karl Bowen
- Graham Dowie
- Christopher Hobbs
- Gerald Incandela
- Andrew Logan
- Luciana Martínez
- Lucy Su
- Kevin Whitney
- Francis Wishart
