= Alec Bangham =

British biophysicist (1921–2010)

Alec Douglas Bangham FRS (10 November 1921 Manchester – 9 March 2010 Great Shelford) was a British biophysicist who first studied blood clotting mechanisms but became well known for his research on liposomes and his invention of clinically useful artificial lung surfactants.

== Life ==
Bangham was the son of Donald Bangham, and Edith Kerby. He studied at the Downs School, and then Bryanston School, and proceeded to earn an MB MS in medicine from University College London.

He was appointed to Addenbrooke's Hospital, where he served as a pathologist, in the Royal Army Medical Corps, becoming a captain in 1948.

Bangham worked at the Babraham Institute in Cambridge from 1952 to 1982. He is best known for his research on liposomes.

== Family ==
He was married to Rosalind; they had four children and eleven grandchildren.

His brother was Derek Bangham.

== Awards ==
- 1965 doctorate of medicine from London University
- 1977 Fellow of the Royal Society
- 1981 Fellow of University College London
- 1997 distinguished fellow of the Royal College of Physicians
