= Francis Davison =

Francis Davison may refer to:

- Francis Davison (artist) (1919–1984), British visual artist and painter
- Francis Davison (poet) (c. 1575–1616), English lawyer, poet and anthologist
