= Anthony Fry =

Anthony Fry may refer to:

- Anthony Fry (artist) (1927–2016), British painter
- Anthony Fry (business executive), British broadcasting executive
