= Listed buildings in Somerton, Suffolk =

Civil Parish in Suffolk, England

Somerton is a village and civil parish in the Babergh District of Suffolk, England. It contains ten listed buildings that are recorded in the National Heritage List for England. Of these one is grade I and nine are grade II.

This list is based on the information retrieved online from Historic England.

== Key ==
Grade	Criteria
I	Buildings that are of exceptional interest
II*	Particularly important buildings of more than special interest
II	Buildings that are of special interest

== Listing ==
Name	Grade	Location	Type	Completed (Note: The date given is the date used by Historic England as significant for the initial building or that of an important part in the structure's description.)	Date designated	Grid ref. (Note: The grid reference is based on the British national grid reference system, sometimes known as OSGB36, used by the Ordnance Survey.) Geo-coordinates	Notes	Entry number (Note: The "List Entry Number" is a unique number assigned to each listed building and scheduled monument by Historic England.)	Image	Wikidata
K6 Telephone Kiosk North East of Church of All Saints	II				18 February 1992	TL8111953032; 52°08′45″N 0°38′44″E		1258460	Upload Photo	Q26549692
Brttons Farmhouse	II	Cooks Lane			9 February 1978	TL8130454481; 52°09′32″N 0°38′57″E		1199686	Upload Photo	Q26495549
Hall Cottages	II	Lower Street			9 February 1978	TL8148652018; 52°08′12″N 0°39′02″E		1033563	Upload Photo	Q26285046
Hare and Hounds	II	Lower Street			9 February 1978	TL8140551914; 52°08′09″N 0°38′57″E		1033562	Upload Photo	Q26285045
Somerton Hall	II	Lower Street			9 February 1978	TL8151651951; 52°08′10″N 0°39′03″E		1283226	Upload Photo	Q26572099
Church Cottage	II	Upper Somerton			9 February 1978	TL8111853056; 52°08′46″N 0°38′44″E		1199755	Upload Photo	Q26495615
Church Farmhouse	II	Upper Somerton			10 January 1953	TL8110553146; 52°08′49″N 0°38′44″E		1033565	Upload Photo	Q26285048
Church of St Margaret	I	Upper Somerton	church building		23 March 1961	TL8108653015; 52°08′45″N 0°38′42″E		1033564	Church of St Margaret More images	Q17541611
Fern Cottage	II	Upper Somerton			9 February 1978	TL8108653213; 52°08′51″N 0°38′43″E		1033520	Upload Photo	Q26285004
Somerton House	II	Upper Somerton			9 February 1978	TL8110153179; 52°08′50″N 0°38′44″E		1033566	Upload Photo	Q26285049

== See also ==
- Grade I listed buildings in Suffolk
- Grade II* listed buildings in Suffolk

== Sources ==
- Bettely, James; Pevsner, Nikolaus (2015) [1961], Suffolk: West, The Buildings of England, New Haven and London: Yale University Press, ISBN 978-0-300-19655-9
