= Tibbles =

Tibbles and Tibble may refer to:

- Tibbles, a pet cat which is alleged to have wiped out Lyall's wren on Stephens Island in New Zealand
- tibble, an alternative to a dataframe or datatable in the tidyverse in the R programming language

== People ==
- Thomas Henry Tibbles (1840–1928), American abolitionist, author, journalist, Indians' rights activist, and politician
- Susette LaFlesche Tibbles (1854–1903), Native American lecturer, writer, and artist from the Omaha tribe in Nebraska
- George Tibbles (1913–1987), American screenwriter and composer
- Stephen Andrew Tibble (1953–1975), London Metropolitan Police officer who was shot and killed by Liam Quinn, a member of the IRA
- Geoffrey Arthur Tibble (1909–1952), English artist
- Tayi Tibble (born 1995), New Zealand poet

== Characters ==
- The Tibble twins, brothers Timmy and Tommy Tibble, characters from the TV show Arthur
- Tibbles, an antagonist in the Disney Channel animated series The Owl House
