= Michael Wishart =

English painter (1928–1996)

John Michael Wishart (June 12, 1928 – June 29, 1996) known as Michael Wishart, was an English figurative painter who spent most of his career in France, America and North Africa. A friend of Francis Bacon and Lucian Freud, he published a memoir in 1977 entitled High Diver (in French Le Saut de l'ange), which caused a scandal with its description of his bohemian lifestyle.

== Biography ==
Born on June 12, 1928, in the London borough of St Pancras, Wishart was the first son of Ernest Wishart (1902–1987), co-founder of the Marxist publishing house Lawrence and Wishart, and of Lorna Garman (1911–2000), future model and mistress of the painter Lucian Freud. His godmother was the collector Peggy Guggenheim, and his half-sister Yasmin was the daughter of Laurie Lee. Raised in Sussex, he studied at Bedales School, at the Central School of Arts and Crafts in London and at the Anglo-French Art School in St. John's Wood, where he was taught by Óscar Domínguez, Antoni Clavé, Jean Lurçat and André Lhote. He then studied with the painter Cedric Morris in Suffolk.

He had early success with his first major exhibition at the Redfern Gallery in 1956. It was given a glowing review by David Sylvester who had hung the exhibition for him, so much so that Wishart stated that he had been overawed by the reaction, giving him doubts as to whether he would be able to live up to it. In the eyes of several who knew him and his work, this he signally failed to do, succumbing instead to a hedonistic lifestyle, his painting activity continuing only because "his need to paint was always stronger than a desire to go under."

He married on June 12, 1950, the artist Anne Dunn, with whom he had a son in 1951, Francis. They divorced in 1960 (Dunn later married the painter Rodrigo Moynihan). His half-sister Yasmin David was also a painter.

Wishart wrote a second volume of memoirs, entitled Injury Time, which is yet to be published. He died on June 29, 1996, in Wandsworth.
