= Forbidden Forest (film) =

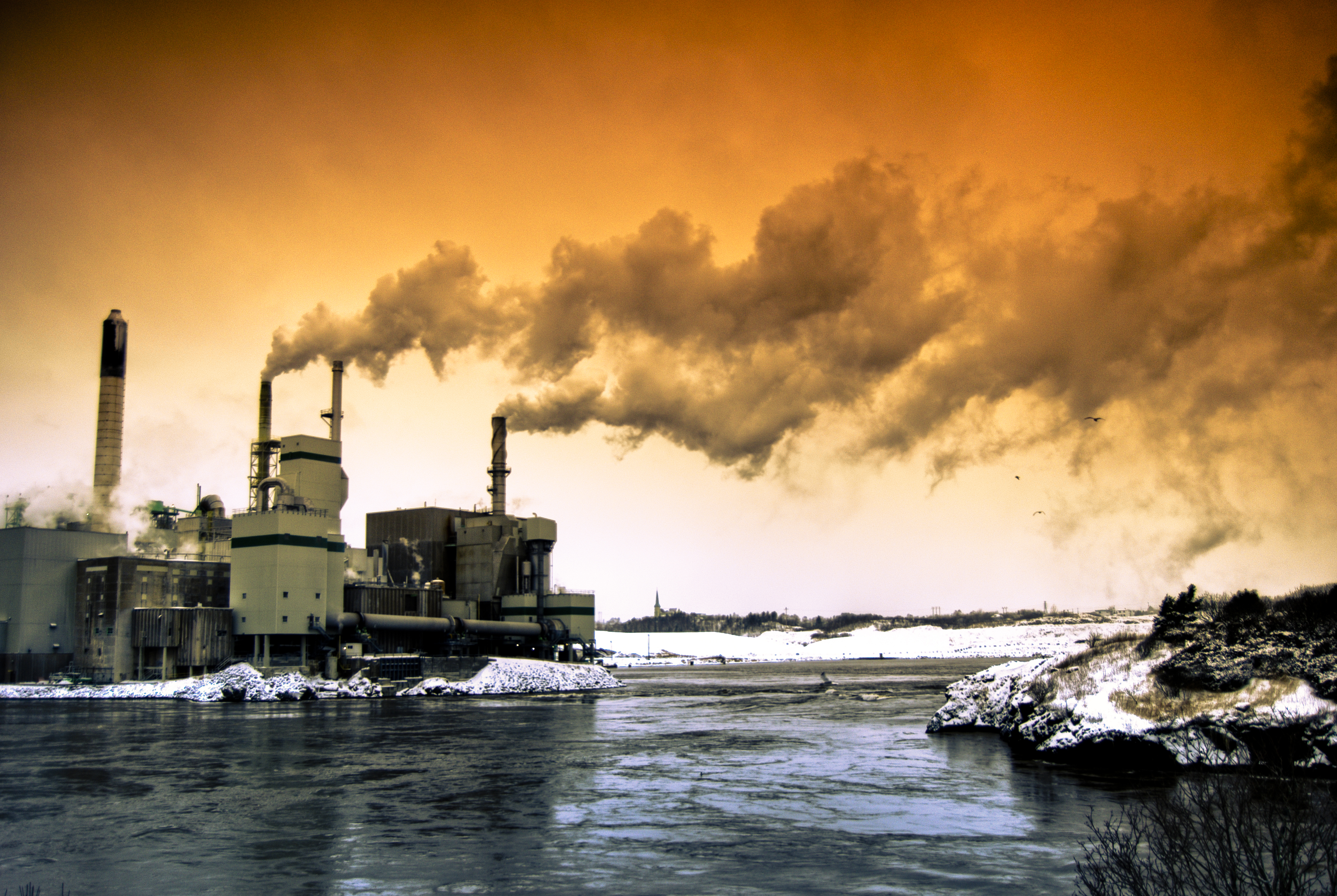
- Directed by: Kevin W. Matthews
- Production companies: National Film Board of Canada; Timber Colony Inc
- Release date: 2004
- Running time: 70 minutes
- Country: Canada
- Language: French / English

Forbidden Forest is a 2004 Canadian documentary film directed by Kevin W. Matthews. Approximately 70 minutes long, it was co-produced by the National Film Board of Canada and Timber Colony Inc. The film follows Jean Guy Comeau, an Acadian woodlot owner and Francis Wishart, the grandson of Sir James Dunn, as they agitate for responsible forestry on New Brunswick Crown lands.
