= Somerton, Suffolk =

Civil parish in Suffolk, England

Coordinates: 52.144972°N 0.646219°E

Somerton
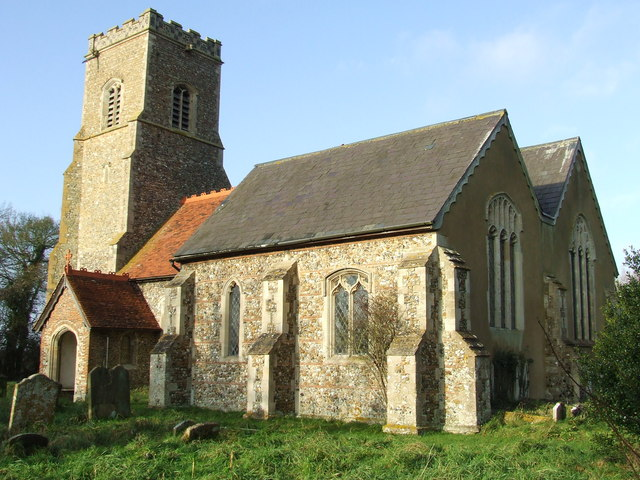
- St Margaret's Somerton

- Location within Suffolk
- Population: 212 (2011)
- District: Babergh
- Shire county: Suffolk
- Region: East
- Country: England
- Sovereign state: United Kingdom
- Post town: Bury St Edmunds
- Postcode district: IP29
- Police: Suffolk
- Fire: Suffolk
- Ambulance: East of England

Somerton is a civil parish in the Babergh district of Suffolk in eastern England.

Somerton is split into two smaller villages: Upper Somerton with a population of approximately 50 and Somerton with a population of about 20. Upper Somerton is at the top of one valley and has St. Margaret's Church, a phone box and post box. Somerton is at the bottom of the same valley and has only a post box.

The villages comprise rural houses and farms with some council houses. Its nearest villages are Hartest, Brockley and Hawkedon. There was once quite the rivalry between Hartest and Somerton, and a giant stone found in Somerton was stolen by Hartest and rolled down the valley where it still sits on their village green.

The nearest town is Bury St Edmunds or Sudbury.

== Notable residents ==
- Elsie Few (1909-1980), artist.
- Claude Rogers (1907-1979), painter, art teacher, a founding member of the Euston Road School and President of the London Group of British artists.
