= Anne Dunn =

English artist

Anne Dunn (born 4 September 1929) is an English artist associated with the second generation of the School of London.

== Background and education ==
Dunn was born at Norwich House on Norfolk Street, London, the daughter of Canadian steel magnate Sir James Dunn, 1st Baronet (1874–1956) and his second wife, Irene Clarice Richards. Her mother was a former musical-comedy actress who had previously been married to Francis Douglas, 11th Marquess of Queensberry.

Dunn studied in London at Chelsea School of Art (1949–50) and at the Anglo-French Art Centre (1952) before going to the Académie Julian in Paris, France in 1952.

== Career ==
Dunn's first solo exhibition was at the Leicester Galleries in London in 1957. After several further shows at the Leicester Galleries, she exhibited at the Fischbach Gallery in New York for the first time in 1967. She exhibited there regularly until 1989. Dunn had a solo show at the Christopher Hull Gallery in London in 1990.

From 1964 to 1967, she and Rodrigo Moynihan published the journal Art and Literature, edited by Sonia Orwell and John Ashbery. Her most recent solo show was in 2005 at the Tibor de Nagy Gallery in New York.

== Personal life ==
Dunn's first husband was the artist Michael Wishart (1928–1996); they were married for 10 years before divorcing, and had one son, Francis. Michael Wishart's autobiography High Diver (1977) is dedicated to her and gives a picture of the artist as a young woman.

Immediately after she and Wishart divorced in 1960, Dunn married Anglo-Spanish artist Rodrigo Moynihan (1910–1990), as his second wife. They had a son together and Dunn gained a stepson through the marriage.
