= Pierre Martory =

French poet (1920–1998)

- Born: December 1, 1920; Bayonne, France
- Died: October 5, 1998 (aged 77)
- Education: School of Political Science, Paris
- Occupation: Poet
- Writing career
- Notable works: Phébus ou le beau mariage, Every Question but One, The Landscape is Behind the Door, Veillur de jours, The Landscapist: Selected Poems
- Movement: New York School

Pierre Martory (December 1, 1920 – October 5, 1998) was a French poet whose influence on New York School poets was quiet but profound. His work was admired by Frank O'Hara, James Schuyler, Harry Mathews, and others, and translated extensively by John Ashbery, with whom he shared his life in Paris for nearly a decade. His work has appeared in many books in both England and the United States, as well as in The New Yorker and Poetry. Martory’s personal “charm,” the poet Ann Lauterbach once said, “devolved back to the original meaning of ‘spell.’” However, as Ashbery has noted, “Both the humor and the sadness in his poems are always rendered with an unemphatic clarity that is certainly Mozartian.” Born in Bayonne, France, of partly Basque ancestry, Pierre Martory spent much of his early life in Morocco. He joined the Free French Forces in North Africa when World War II interrupted his college studies at the School of Political Science, Paris. Afterwards, he began writing fiction and poetry and studied music as well. In 1953, Denoël published his first novel, Phébus ou le beau mariage. His other novels remain unpublished. For more than twenty years, he was drama and music critic at Paris Match, where he mentored and worked with the journalist Denis Demonpion, now editor of Le Point and a biographer.

John Ashbery, in France on a Fulbright scholarship, met Martory in March 1956, and they lived together there for nine years, inspiring and influencing each other’s work. Ashbery dedicated The Tennis Court Oath (1962), one of his most experimental collections, to Martory. As Ashbery suggests, Martory composed poetry with “trace elements of Holderlin, Rilke and Trakl,” with “echoes of ‘fringe’ surrealists like Pierre Reverdy and the chameleon-like Raymond Queneau,” and with “the austerity of Jouve’s poetry and the cloudy fantasy of Supervielle’s. . . . There is a touch of the gaiety of Charles Trenet and of René Clair’s early films; of the blues of his favorite singers Florel and Piaf.” But as Ashbery concludes, “In the end, the only fruitful comparison seems to be with Arthur Rimbaud, and not because Martory’s poetry resembles his, but because both are similar in resembling no one else.” Martory collaborated with Francis Wishart on a volume of text and etchings entitled Père Lachaise in the seventies, and Wishart also created art for a posthumous collaboration, Oh, Lac / Oh, Lake, in 2008. In 1990, Ashbery translated Martory’s first poetry collection, Every Question but One (Intuflo Editions–Groundwater Press, 1990). Of his second collection, The Landscape is Behind the Door (Sheep Meadow Press, 1994), Ashbery says, “His dreams, his pessimistic résumés of childhood that are suddenly lanced by a joke, his surreal loves, his strangely lit landscapes with their inquisitive birds and disquieting flora, are fertile influences for me.” Veilleur de jours (Alyscamps Press/Sheep Meadow Press, 1997), his first French collection, contains a broad selection of work. An extensive selection of his poetry and an essay on Henry James's Washington Square appear in Ashbery's two Collected French Translations volumes.

Schuyler's poem "Letter to a Friend: Who Is Nancy Daum" refers to an Alex Katz portrait of Martory with a pipe, in the collection of the Flow Chart Foundation. An interview in The American Poetry Review with the poet from 1992 is available online. In the Times Literary Supplement, the poet Mark Ford predicts a wider recognition to come for this transatlantic poet: "It is to be hoped that, just as Edgar Allan Poe only became acceptable to Americans once endorsed by Baudelaire, the French will soon find themselves belatedly discovering one of their finest twentieth-century poets, and saluting him in the niche in the poetic pantheon prepared by his American admirers."
