= Derek Bangham =

British painter

Derek Bangham FRCP
- Born: Derek Raymond Bangham; 19 September 1924
- Died: 2 January 2008 (aged 83); London, England
- Education: Downs School; Bryanston School.
- Alma mater: King's College London; University College Hospital Medical School
- Occupations: Physician; Research scientist
- Employers: National Institute for Medical Research; National Institute for Biological Standards and Control

Derek Raymond Bangham FRCP (19 September 1924 – 2 January 2008) was a British doctor and research scientist.

== Early life ==
He was born in Manchester, England on 19 September 1924 and attended The Downs School, near Malvern, where his teachers included W. H. Auden, and Bryanston School.

He was declared medically unfit to serve during World War II, and instead read biological sciences at King's College London, afterwards attending University College Hospital Medical School.

== Career ==
In 1952, he gave up medical practice to join the National Institute for Medical Research (NIMR), investigating parasites. He was promoted to Head of the Division of Biological Standards at the NIMR in 1961.

From 1972 to 1987 he was Head of the Hormones Division of the National Institute for Biological Standards and Control (NIBSC).

He was also a member of the World Health Organization's European committee on biological standardization, the committee of the European Pharmacopoeia and the committee of the British Pharmacopoeia Commission.

== Personal life ==
Bangham was an accomplished amateur artist. Two of his paintings are in the collection of the Royal Free Hospital.

He died on 2 January 2008. His brother was Alec Bangham.

Bangham was married to Alison Mary Bangham (née Harington), a fellow doctor who he met at University College Hospital. They were married in 1952.

== Awards ==
- Silver plate of the Society for Endocrinology (1986; the first awarded) for his "distinguished contribution to British endocrinology"
- Fellowship of the Royal College of Physicians (1981)

== Notable works ==
- A history of biological standardization: the characterization and measurement of complex molecules important in clinical and research medicine : contributions from the UK 1900-1995 : what, why, how, where and by whom. published with the assistance of the Society for Endocrinology. 1999. ISBN 978-1-898099-14-7.
