= Humphrey Kay =

English haematologist and oncologist

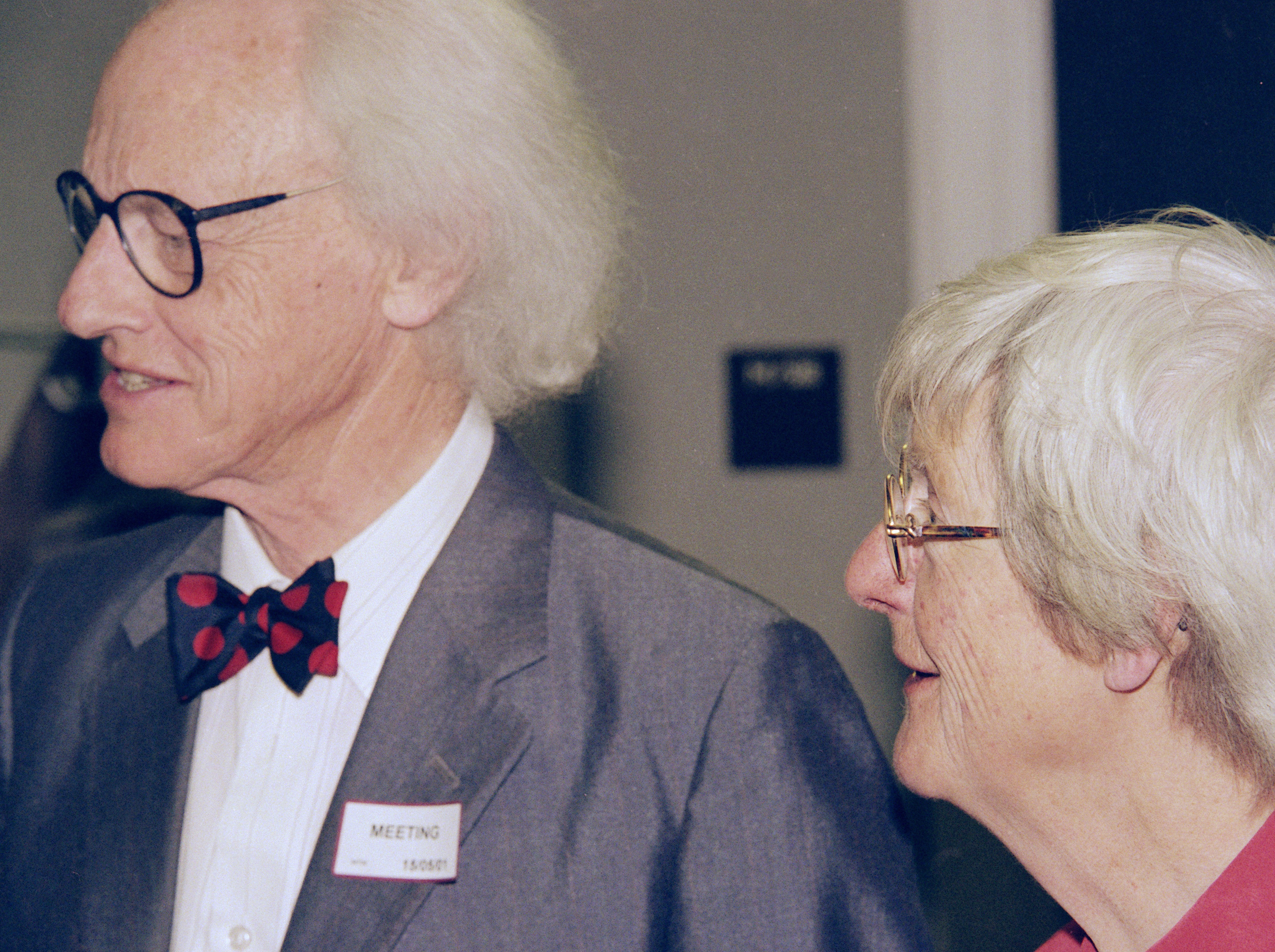
Humphrey Kay (left) in 2001

Humphrey Edward Melville Kay (10 October 1923 – 20 October 2009) was an English pathologist and haematologist who oversaw clinical trials for leukaemia treatments for the Medical Research Council in the 1960s and 1970s.

== Early life ==
Kay was born in 1923 in Croydon. He and his mother, a missionary doctor, moved to Lahore, where his father worked as an Anglican minister. The family returned to England when Kay was four years old, and he attended The Downs Malvern prep school, where he was taught English by W. H. Auden. He then attended Bryanston School and qualified from St Thomas's Hospital Medical School in 1945. After joining the RAF Volunteer Reserve in 1947, he was transferred to the Aden Protectorate. He married April Powlett, a rheumatologist, in 1950.

== Career ==
After returning to London from Aden, Kay worked for six years as a pathologist at St Thomas' Hospital. He was appointed a consultant pathologist at the Royal Marsden Hospital, a specialist cancer treatment hospital in London, in 1956. At the Royal Marsden, Kay's research interests shifted to haematology, and particularly leukaemia. At the time, leukaemia was a fatal disease, usually causing death within weeks of diagnosis, and there was little consensus about treatment options. Kay organised and oversaw multiple clinical trials funded by the Medical Research Council relating to leukaemia treatments and served as secretary to the MRC's Leukaemia Committee from its founding in 1968 to its disbanding to 1977. Other MRC trials that Kay coordinated at the Royal Marsden focused on multiple myeloma and polycythaemia rubra vera. He was editor of the Journal of Clinical Pathology from 1972 to 1980.

At the Royal Marsden, Kay helped to design and was the first administrator of an isolation ward for patients with weakened immune systems that was built in 1963. The concept was so successful that a larger version of the ward was opened in 1973 and was equipped for intensive treatment of acute leukaemias. At the time of his retirement as a professor of haematology in 1984, leukaemia had become a largely curable disease.

== Later life ==
After his retirement, Kay became a keen naturalist and conservationist in the Wiltshire area. He was elected to the council of the Wiltshire Wildlife Trust in 1983 and was awarded the Christopher Cadbury Medal by the Wildlife Trusts in 1996.

Kay's first wife, April Powlett, died in 1990; he remarried to Sallie Perry in 1996. He died in Marlborough, Wiltshire, in 2009.
