= Patrick George =

English painter (1923–2016)

Patrick George

Patrick Herbert George (28 July 1923 – 23 April 2016) was an English painter who taught at the Slade School of Fine Art in London for most of his career. He was best known for his landscapes but also painted a number of portraits, including one of Natalie Dower which is in Tate's collection.

== Early life ==
Patrick George was born in Wilmslow, Cheshire, on 28 July 1923. He was educated at The Downs School, Herefordshire, and Bryanston School. He studied at the Edinburgh College of Art (1941–42) followed by service in the Royal Navy during the Second World War. He was in a landing craft during the Normandy landings and later served in the Far East before being demobilised in 1946. He then studied at the Camberwell School of Art.

== Career ==
George taught at the Slade School of Fine Art in London from 1949, always on a part-time basis. He taught at the Nigerian College of Art in Zaria towards the end of the 1950s before returning to the Slade where he rose to become director of school and Slade Professor of Fine Art from 1985 until his retirement in 1988.

He had several exhibitions throughout his career, most notably one at Gainsborough's House in 1975 and a one-man show at the Serpentine Gallery in 1980, and many at Browse and Darby in London.

== See also ==
- William Coldstream
