= Helen Douglas (book artist) =

Scottish book artist

Helen Douglas (born 1952) is a Scottish book artist, publisher and educator known for her work with artist's books.

== Early life and education ==
Douglas was born in Galashiels, grew up on a farm in the Scottish Borders, and studied at the Carlisle College of Art and Design. She received a BA in History of Art and Architecture from the University of East Anglia in 1973 and pursued post-graduate studies in textile design at the Scottish College of Textiles. In 1975, Douglas settled in Yarrow. She received a PhD from the Arts faculty at the University of Edinburgh in 1997.

== Career ==
From 1975 to 1994, Douglas produced artist's books under the series name Weproductions in partnership with Telfer Stokes; since then, she has produced her books solo.

In 2006, Douglas was made a life member of the Museum of Modern Art in New York City.

Douglas has lectured at the Scottish College of Textiles, was a lecturer on book arts at the University of the Arts London, and has been part of a research group investigating the artist's book in digital format.

=== Reception ===
Curator and Librarian Clive Phillpot writes, "Helen Douglas has been engaged with nature and with narratives for much of her life. Her formative years were spent in the Scottish Borders in a farming community, and she returned to live there as a working artist. Her chosen medium for embodying her expressive visual narratives has for many years been the photographic image used in conjunction with the book. Her works have been collected and exhibited nationally and internationally, and her achievements in the field of artist books are manifold."

=== Works ===
- Loophole, 1974
- Threads, 1974
- Chinese Whisphers, 1975
- Clinkscale with Telfer Stokes, 1977
- Water on the Border, 1994
- Between the Two, 1997
- Wild Wood: A Border Ballad, 1999
- Unravelling the Ripple, 2001
- Illiers Combray, 2004
- Loch, 2005
- A Venetian Brocade, 2010
- The Pond at Deuchar, 2013
- In Mexico, 2014
- Dark Cloud, 2015
- Follow the River, 2017

== Awards ==
Douglas has been awarded the:

- Publishing Award from the Scottish Arts Council for Chinese Whispers (1975)
- Publishing Award from the Arts Council of Great Britain for Clinkscale (1977)
- Hope Scott Trust Award for Water on the Border (1993)
- Atlanta Book Prize for Wild Wood (2001)
- Birgit Skiold Memorial Trust Award for excellence
- LAB 2004 for Illiers Combray
- 1st Seoul International Bookarts Competition, (2005)
- LAB 2006 for Swan Songs with damselflies
