= Downs Light Railway =

Narrow-gauge railway line in the UK

Overview
- Owner: Downs Light Railway Trust
- Locale: The Downs Malvern, Colwall, Herefordshire, England
- Coordinates: 52.087310°N 2.352882°W
- Stations: 1
- Website: www.dlrtrust.co.uk

Service
- Type: Private

History
- Opened: 1925

Technical
- Track length: 0.75 mi (1.21 km)
- Track gauge: 9 1/2 in (241 mm)
- Old gauge: 7 1/4 in (184 mm)

The Downs Light Railway is the world's oldest private miniature railway, with a track gauge of 9 1/2 in (241 mm). The railway is located within the grounds of The Downs Malvern, a private school in Colwall, near the town of Malvern, Worcestershire in the English Midlands. It is owned by the Downs Light Railway Trust.

The Downs Light Railway is maintained and operated principally by the school children, aged between 7 and 13 years. It provides a wide range of educational and regular extra-curricular activities, and supports other local schools. After reappraising the Downs Light Railway Trust's public benefit requirements, activities extended to young people from the community at large. As of 2019, it is part of the Heritage Railway Association membership.

== History ==
The railway was built and opened in 1925 under the guidance of Geoffrey Hoyland (Headmaster) as a 7 1/4 in (184 mm) gauge railway, for the principal purpose of education. The railway was regauged during the 1930s to the larger gauge of 9 1/2 in, to allow for new locos to be used on the line. After Hoyland fell ill and retired from the school, the railway deteriorated until it became unsafe to use by the late 1960s.

During the 1970s, restoration work began by former pupils of the school, most notably James Boyd. In 1983, the railway was handed over to the Downs Light Railway Trust, who became responsible for its ownership, preservation and operation. James Boyd's legacy was taken on by another former pupil in the late 2000s, Timothy Pennock, who begun a series of restoration projects involving young people. The projects concluded with a Railway Exhibition and Steam Gala in 2017. A development programme was established to integrate the Downs Light Railway into the heritage railways industry as a youth education leader.

In June 2021 the railway was presented with the Heritage Railway Association's Small Groups Award. In 2022, two teenagers and Downs Light Railway volunteers won the Heritage Railway Association's Innovative Fundraising Award for raising £2,000 and unlocking funding to an amount of £50,000 of funding for the charity's Centenary Development Programme.

In 2022, The Downs Malvern announced its plan to merge with The Elms, which would result in the closure of the Brockhill Road school placing the Downs Light Railway's future in jeopardy. Despite their initial plans, the merger collapsed. Between 2022 and 2025 the railway no longer featured as a member of the Heritage Railway Association. In 2025, The Downs Malvern announced the closure of the Brockhill Road site, with intentions to move the school to Malvern College. Growing concerns emerged again after the Downs Light Railway's future appeared to be nearing the end, with the site being listed for sale with Savills. In October 2026, the Charity Commission for England and Wales issued a regulatory alert for the Downs Light Railway Trust after the trustees applied to dissolve the Downs Light Railway Trust and remove it from the register of charities.

== Locomotives ==
Name	Wheel Arrangement	Builder	Date built	Disposal	Notes
Tubby	2-6-2	Design by Henry Greenly, using Parver/Bassett Lowke parts.	Arrived in 1924	Dismantled in 1989	One of the first 7 1/4 in (184 mm) gauge locomotives to utilise a narrow gauge outline. The locomotive underwent two modifications; the first during the early 1930s, and the second in 1937 where it was re-gauged to 9 1/2 in (241 mm). Rebuilt as Tubby II, later renamed James Boyd (q.v.).
Maud	2-6-0		Arrived 1929	Sold in the late 1930s	A scale model to Great Western Railway outline. Maud never wore its own nameplates; however, other than information retained by the School, its name is referred to in an edition of the Model Engineer. Its subsequent history is unknown.
Ranmore	0-4-2T		Arrived 1937	Sold in 1942.	
George	4-4-2		1939	Sold in 1989 to the Cadbury family	Originally purchased in 1941, it remained in service until 1986. After the sale to the Cadburys it remained on static display at the school until 2003. Following a change of ownership, it was rebuilt and returned to the railway in 2006.
Brock	0-4-0T+T	David Curwen	1973	In use	Built for James Boyd, the locomotive was bequeathed to the Downs Light Railway Trust in 1995.
Tim	0-6-0PH	Downs Light Railway Trust	1984	In use	
James Boyd	2-6-2	John Milner	1991	In use	The locomotive re-used some parts from Tubby and arrived as Tubby II. The locomotive was officially named James Boyd in 1992.

The 4-4-0 locomotive Orion paid a visit to the Downs Light Railway on 24 April 2005 for its first public steaming in many years, following its disappearance, rediscovery and restoration.
