= Telfer Stokes =

English painter

Telfer Stokes (born 1940) is a Scottish artist and publisher.

The son of Margaret Mellis and Adrian Stokes, he was born in St Ives and studied at the Slade School of Fine Art. He pursued postgraduate studies at the Brooklyn Museum Art School after being awarded a Beckmann Fellowship. He taught at Reading Art School and the Bath Academy in Corsham and exhibited his paintings in London, including a show at the Serpentine Gallery. In 1971, Stokes founded publishing firm Weproductions, which produced artist's books; from 1974, he operated in partnership with Helen Douglas. In 2002, Stokes moved to East Anglia to care for his mother. He redirected his focus to sculpture, which he exhibited at the Kettle's Yard open house in 2008 and at shows in various galleries.
