= Natalie Dower =

Natalie Dower (1931–2023) was an English artist. Her work is in the tradition of Constructivist and Systems art, and her particular interest was in the use of mathematical principles to create works that demonstrate variations on an endless theme.

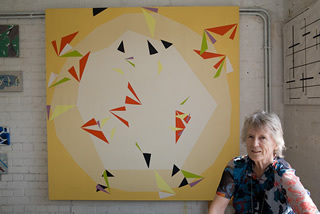
Natalie Dower at her studio in London, June 2007

== Life ==
Natalie Dower was born in London on November 4, 1931. Her parents were Alan Vincent Gandar Dower and Aymée Lavender Clerk (known as Lavender Dower after her marriage). She had prominent uncles, Eric Gandar, the founder of Aberdeen Airport and Aberdeen Airways, and Kenneth Gandar-Dower the author, aviator and explorer.

Natalie studied at St Martins, at Camberwell and at the Slade School of Art (1948–54). One of her tutors at Camberwell was Kenneth Martin. She taught at St Albans and Camberwell School of Art, Bath Academy of Art, Corsham, Byam Shaw and the Chelsea School of Art. She was the subject of a 1958 portrait by her fellow student Patrick George, which was bought by the Tate in 1961.

In a career spanning over 40 years Natalie Dower created an individual visual language; while her imagery was derived from geometric elements and mathematical principles, she made the point that the painting must work even without the viewer's awareness of the system behind it.

Her interest in colour and the quality of light led, in 1966, to her moving to Morocco to live and teach at the American School in Tangier, and in 1976 she moved to Portugal, for the rest of her life dividing her time between London and Portugal. Her physical detachment from the London-based systems movement allowed her the time and space to complete the transition from figurative painting, and to evolve her own individual style. Throughout her time abroad she often returned to the UK, to exhibit work in solo and group shows, to work as an A level exam marker, and to give lectures: in 2007 she gave a talk entitled Rules: Convention, science and mathematics in a search for visual language at the London Knowledge Lab, and in October 2013 at the Government Art Collection, to celebrate Ada Lovelace day.

Dower died in 2023, at the age of 92.

== Work ==
Natalie Dower trained first at St Martins, transferring to Camberwell after a year, and moving to the Slade in 1949. Here, the emphasis was on figurative drawing, and Dower's early works are in the figurative tradition. Nearly a decade later, while teaching at Corsham, she developed an interest in Constructivism, as was being taught by her colleague Malcolm Hughes, and she began to develop her interest in making work according to mathematical rules based on proportion, number and rhythm. Excited by the emphasis on logic and rationality in this discipline, she embarked on the true path of her career.

Much of her work is two-dimensional, but in 1976 she produced her first three-dimensional work, (First Relief No.1, oil on wood). Her first sculpture was produced in 1980; while working on a rule-related problem for a working drawing for a painting, she realized that the solution lay in creating the work in three dimensions. These works sometimes incorporate materials including wood or perspex, e.g. Dudeney Tetrahedron – Area 3 (1985) and Fibonacci Squares and Circle (2011).

Dudeney Dissection A sequence of works in the 1980s takes for inspiration the 'Dudeney Dissection', discovered by the Victorian mathematician Henry Ernest Dudeney, in which a square is divided into four areas which can then be reassembled as an equilateral triangle.

Fibonacci sequence A number of works by Dower in the 1990s including Dodecagon:Eliminations use the Fibonacci sequence (1,1,2,3,5,8...) as their underlying system.

Root-2 rectangle The title of the 2010 Square Root 2 paintings refers to a rectangle whose halves have the same proportion as does the whole, or any further ‘halvings’. This series of paintings was initially influenced by Dower's experience of the quality of light in Morocco, where she noticed that things far away were as sharply defined as those nearby, although smaller in scale.

== Bibliography ==
Natalie Dower: Line of Enquiry. Published by EMH Arts in 2012 with a preface by Mel Gooding and text by Alan Fowler. ISBN 978-0-9572258-0-0. Summary:

Natalie Dower: The Music of Systems Andrew Lambirth, Jonathan Clark (London) Jonathan Clark, 2007

== Exhibitions ==
Dower's first solo show was at the Concourse Gallery at the Polytechnic of Central London (1979). This was followed by individual shows at: Air Gallery (1983); Gummesons Konstgalleri, Stockholm (1986); Transformations (1987), Transformations 2 (1990), The Secret Life of the Grid (1992) and Out of the Arc at Curwen Gallery (1995). Her lasdt solo show was 'Reflections', at the Eagle Gallery in London, in December 2015.

She was also included in several important group exhibitions including the Hayward Annual (in 1982) and the Countervail exhibitions in 1992 and 1993. More recent group exhibitions included Réalités Nouvelles, Paris (2012), Panel Paintings: Eagle Gallery, London (2013), Austin/Desmond Fine Art, London (September 2014), and Chance and Order at the Eagle Gallery, London, in December 2014.

Dower's work is in public and private collections around the world, including the Arts Council of Great Britain, the Government Art Collection, London and Mondriaanhuis Amersfoort, the Netherlands.
