= Francis Wishart =

- Born: 1951 (age 74–75); London
- Education: Slade School of Fine Art
- Known for: Etching, monotype
- Parents: Michael Wishart (father); Anne Dunn (mother)
- Relatives: James Hamet Dunn (grandfather)

Francis Wishart is an English artist based in Provence. His primary medium is monotype. He has been active in environmentalist campaigns in France, where he owns an organic vineyard, and in New Brunswick, Canada, where he spends the summer months.

== Family and early life ==
Francis Wishart was born in London in 1951. His parents were the artists Michael Wishart and Anne Dunn. His maternal grandfather was the Canadian financier and industrialist James Hamet Dunn. He grew up in France. He attended Bryanston, an English public school, and the Slade School of Fine Art.

== Art ==
After completing his studies at the Slade, Wishart worked in the medium of etching at the Atelier Lacourière-Frélaut in Paris. In 1978 he published Le Père Lachaise, a portfolio of 20 etchings of graves in the Père Lachaise Cemetery. The portfolio was printed at Lacourière-Frélaut and was accompanied by a text by Pierre Martory which was translated into English by John Ashbery. Wishart also created the art for Oh Lac, Oh Lake, a collection of Martory's poems published posthumously in 2008.

In the 1990s Wishart adopted monotype as his medium, working with oil-based printers ink on zinc plates from which the works are printed. He has developed an innovative technique which involves spreading coloured inks on a black inked background and drawing with "all sorts of tools" to create works that are "not immediately recognised" as monotypes.

His work is held at the Museum of Modern Art, the Metropolitan Museum of Art, and the Victoria and Albert Museum, among other institutions.

== Environmentalism ==
Wishart has a vineyard in Provence where the grapes are grown organically. In 1990 he founded an organization called "Co-ordination Regionale Associative pour la Defense de l'Environnment (CARDE)" to coordinate opposition against the building of the high-speed train line LGV Méditerranée by the Société nationale des chemins de fer français (SNCF). Opponents of the planned route of the train à grande vitesse (TGV) through Provence included wildlife conservationists, farmers, and wine growers including Baron Double of Château de Beaupré.

Wishart spends part of the year in the forest in Gloucester County, New Brunswick at a property that his mother purchased in 1966. The 400 hectare property is adjacent to the Jacquet River Gorge Protected Natural Area, a tract of crown land on which "industrial, commercial, agricultural uses and development are not permitted" and contains a portion of the Nigadoo River watershed. Wishart has attempted to have the property added to the Protected Natural Area in order to safeguard the water in the face of concerns about clearcutting in the area, and has argued for the use of selective cutting methods.

Wishart and Jean-Guy Comeau, an Acadian woodlot owner, were the protagonists of Forbidden Forest, a 2004 documentary film. In the film they travel to Helsinki to attend a shareholders meeting and meet with officials of UPM Kymmene, one of the companies licensed to harvest wood on New Brunswick crown land. They also explore alternative methods of forest management including community forestry.
