= Wendy Pasmore =

British artist

Wendy Lloyd Pasmore, née Blood (9 October 1915 – 2015) was a British artist.

== Early life ==
Pasmore was born in Dublin on 9 October 1915. She studied at the Chelmsford School of Art.

== Career ==
In 1955 she was a member of the Women's International Art Club. She exhibited with the London Group from 1956, and became a member in 1958. Pasmore had a retrospective exhibition at the Molton and Lords Galleries in 1963. Her work is in the collection of Tate.

== Personal life ==
In 1940 she married the artist and architect Victor Pasmore (1908–1998). They had two children, a son and a daughter. Pasmore died in 2015.
