= Ian Angus (librarian) =

British librarian and Orwellian scholar (1926–2022)

Ian Angus (1926 – 30 October 2022) was a British librarian and a scholar on George Orwell.

== Life ==
Once the Librarian at King's College London, while Deputy Librarian at University College London, in 1968 Angus edited, with Sonia Orwell, Orwell's Collected Journalism, Essays and Letters, published by Secker & Warburg. While at University College, he helped set up the Orwell Archive.

In 1976 he became the second husband of the ceramics artist Ann Stokes. Ann had a second studio in Italy where they spent time with Ian tending to their olive trees. The marriage was said to be happy.

Angus later assisted Peter Davison and Sheila Davison in editing the 20-volume work, The Complete Works of George Orwell (Secker and Warburg).

Angus died on 30 October 2022, at the age of 96.
