= Abstract painting (Pasmore) =

1998 painting by Victor Pasmore

- Artist: Victor Pasmore
- Year: 1998
- Medium: oil on canvas
- Dimensions: 200 cm × 192 cm (79 in × 76 in)
- Location: MUŻA, Valletta, Malta

Abstract painting is a 1998 abstract oil painting by Victor Pasmore.

== Description ==
The painting is an oil on canvas with dimensions of 200 x 192 centimeters. It is in the collection of MUŻA in Valletta, Malta.

== Analysis ==
It is a large abstract painting, characteristic of his style. It was the artist's last work, and was donated to the National Museum of Fine Arts, Malta, by the artist's family.
