= Francis Davison (artist) =

English painter (1919–1984)

Francis Davison (1919–1984) was a British visual artist and painter. His later work, starting shortly after his marriage to Margaret Mellis in 1948, is characterised by the use of collage: coloured printed paper layered and mounted on board. Davison remained in relative obscurity until finding recognition in the late 1970s and early 80s. He died in 1984.
