= Francis Hoyland =

English poet

Francis Hoyland (fl. 1763), was an English poet.

== Life ==
Hoyland was the son of James Hoyland of Castle Howard, Yorkshire, and was born in 1727. He was educated in a school at Halifax, and on 18 June 1744 matriculated at Magdalene College, Cambridge, where he graduated B.A. in 1748. Soon afterwards he seems to have made a voyage to the West Indies to recruit his health. He took holy orders, was the friend of William Mason, and was introduced, probably by Mason, to Horace Walpole, who exerted himself on his behalf, and printed his poems at the Strawberry Hill Press in 1769.

From Hoyland's works it may be gathered that he was married and poor. The date of his death is uncertain. In 1769 he was very ill, and his illness prevented him from accepting an offer of a living in South Carolina.

== Works ==
He wrote:

- 'Poems and Translations,' London, 1763, containing three metrical versions of psalms by J. Caley.
- 'Poems,' another edition, slightly altered, Strawberry Hill, 1769 Two impressions with different title-pages appeared the same year.
- 'Odes,' Edinburgh, 1783. His poems were reprinted in vol.xli. of the 'British Poets' (ed.Thomas Park), 1808, and in the 'British Poets,' 1822, vol. lxxiii. 8vo.
