= Ann Stokes =

British and Scottish-born ceramic artist (1922–2014)

- Born: Ann Mellis; 21 September 1922; Gullane, Scotland
- Died: 21 April 2014 (aged 91)
- Known for: Ceramics
- Spouse(s): Adrian Stokes (m. 1947, died) Ian Angus

Ann Stokes or Ann Mellis (21 September 1922 – 21 April 2014) was a British and Scottish-born ceramic artist.

== Life ==
Stokes was born on the east coast of Scotland at Gullane in 1922. She was born at the manse as her father was a Reverend.

In 1939, her sister and her husband Adrian Stokes, who was a writer and leading art critic, had moved to St Ives, where they would establish a new artistic school. Ann went to live with her sister, where she would meet some of the artists who became important to the new school.

In 1946, Adrian's marriage to her sister failed and the following year he married Ann. This was illegal in Britain, so they had to travel to Switzerland to find someone who was legally allowed to marry them.

In 1957, she took up pottery and she studied the subject deeply, while presenting her work to friends as a hobby, with an annual sale of work.

Adrian died and after a number of years she remarried Ian Angus, who was a librarian and an expert of George Orwell. They would spend part of the year in Italy, where Stokes had another studio. Her new husband would amuse himself caring for their olives. They were happy together.

Stokes ceramics were collected in her lifetime. She would create sculptures of animals like crocodiles, fish and birds as well as painted plates. Her influences included ancient Cretan pots, Mediterranean pottery and the work of Alfred Wallis. She was chosen as the first modern potter to exhibit at the Hayward Gallery in 1985 – and thirty years later there has not been another.
