= Geoffrey Tibble =

English artist (1909–1952)

- Born: Geoffrey Arthur Tibble; 27 February 1909; Reading, Berkshire, England
- Died: 12 December 1952 (aged 43); Amersham, Buckinghamshire, England
- Burial place: Beaconsfield Cemetery, Beaconsfield, Buckinghamshire, England
- Education: Reading University School of Art; Slade School of Fine Arts
- Occupation: Artist
- Years active: 1931–1952
- Spouse: Marjorie Edwards (m. 1943)
- Children: 2

Geoffrey Arthur Tibble (27 February 1909 – 12 December 1952) was an English painter. In the 1930s he was prominent in the Objective Abstraction movement, followed, after a brief Surrealist moment, by the Euston Road School.

Marjorie Tibble, 1935

A review of a retrospective exhibition said, "His work—dingy but packed with period atmosphere—looks back towards the intimate interiors of Vuillard, and forward to the domestic squalor of the Kitchen Sink School".

Crayon, 1945

== Early life ==
Geoffrey Arthur Tibble was born in Reading, Berkshire, England on 27 February 1909, as the younger child to Frederick Tibble (1874–1949) and his wife, Eva (née Fereday; 1878–1951). He had an elder brother, Leonard Frederick "John" Tibble (1905–1978).

Tibble was educated at Reading University School of Art. In 1927, at the age of 18, he entered the Slade School of Fine Art, under Henry Tonks, where he was a contemporary of William Coldstream.

== Career ==
Tibble was a significant figure in the short-lived Objective Abstraction movement. In 1934, he exhibited abstract works at the Exhibition of Objective Abstractions at the Zwemmer Gallery, London (works described as "vortices in pigment, suggesting rather than representing something in nature"). He later destroyed or overpainted most of the works from this abstract period.

After briefly experimenting with surrealism, by 1937, Tibble had returned to figurative art, moving toward the Euston Road School of urban realism, which was founded by William Coldstream. In 1944, he became a member of the New English Art Club. He also exhibited with The London Group, after his military service during World War II.

Tibble had his first solo exhibition at Tooth's Gallery in 1946, showing 25 paintings, all interiors with figures, a format that remained typical in his work. These were critically acclaimed for their "remarkable assurance, the certainty of aim and economy of means" and their resemblance to the work of Degas.

Tibble subsequently exhibited at leading London galleries, including the Leicester and Lefevre galleries.

His work is now in a number of UK museum collections, including Tate Britain, the National Galleries of Scotland in Edinburgh, the Ulster Museum in Belfast, the National Museum Cardiff in Cardiff, Manchester Art Gallery, and the Arts Council Collection in London; also the Yale Center for British Art.

== Personal life ==
Tibble married Marjorie Alice Serene Edwards in Marylebone, Middlesex in July 1934. They had two daughters together; Paula C Barnett (née Tibble; born 1938) and Georgina M Eddy (née Tibble; born 1946).

=== Death ===
Tibble died suddenly at Frogmore Bungalow, his home in Amersham, Buckinghamshire, on 12 December 1952. He was 43. His funeral service was held at St. Mary's Church, Beaconsfield on 16 December 1952. He was buried at Beaconsfield Cemetery.

Tibble's widow married Christopher F Hobbs in Amersham in July 1955. She died in Surrey on 29 June 1968, at the age of 60, following a road accident.
