= The Downs Malvern =

Location
- Brockhill Road; Colwall; Malvern, Herefordshire, WR13 6EY; England; 52.0864°N 2.3538°W

Information
- Type: Independent preparatory school
- Motto: Sapien qui prospect (The wise man who looks ahead)
- Religious affiliations: Christian, ex-Quaker
- Established: 1900; 126 years ago
- Founders: Herbert and Ethel Jones
- Department for Education URN: 117002 Tables
- Chairman of Governors: Rev Kevin Madden
- Headmaster: Andy Nuttall
- Staff: 57
- Gender: Coeducational
- Age: 2 to 13
- Enrolment: 224
- Houses: Sanger Cadbury Lewis Morgan
- Colours: blue, green
- Publication: The Badger and The Owl
- Website: http://www.thedownsmalvern.org.uk

The Downs Malvern is a private prep school in the United Kingdom, founded in 1900. It is located on a 55-acre (22 ha) site in the village of Colwall in the County of Herefordshire, on the western slopes of the Malvern Hills 3 miles (4.8 km) from Great Malvern. The school takes children aged 2 to 13 and comprises a nursery, kindergarten, pre-prep, and preparatory school; the preparatory school takes both day students and boarders. The Headmaster since 2020 has been Andy Nuttall. Fees are currently up to £21,471 pa for full boarders and up to £16,221 pa for day pupils.

Since 2008 the Downs has been the preparatory school for Malvern College.

A distinctive feature of the school is its miniature-gauge railway, the Downs Light Railway, which was begun in 1925. Complete with a tunnel and a station, it is the world's oldest private miniature railway.

== History ==
The Downs School at Colwall was founded in 1900 by Herbert Jones, who had been educated in Cambridge and was headmaster at Leighton Park School when he and his wife Ethel Jones founded the Downs Malvern as a preparatory school for boys. It opened with four pupils, and slowly expanded, with 40 pupils in 1918.

The Jones were Quakers, and the Downs was unusual in being a Quaker school, a status which would eventually fade away. The Quaker ambience meant that several of the staff were conscientious objectors in the First World War. It was also unusual in pioneering extra-curricular activities, such as music and hobbies, for its pupils. This innovation would eventually spread across the mainstream preparatory schools.

In 1920 the Joneses left, and were succeeded by the second master, Geoffrey Hoyland, a conscientious objector and Quaker. He had married into the Cadbury family and used the family's wealth to expand and improve the school during his tenure as headmaster. Hoyland built new buildings, introduced student self-government and an innovative curriculum with an emphasis on science and the arts. Under his supervision, the pupils built and maintained a miniature railway, the only one in any English school at the time, which still survives. Among the notable masters he hired were the painter Maurice Feild and the poet W. H. Auden.

Frazer Hoyland succeeded his brother Geoffrey as headmaster in 1940. He increased the school's emphasis on music and drama. Shortly after the war the poet James Kirkup taught at the school for four terms, and wrote his first collection there. Julius Harrison composed a cantata and sonata for the school's Jubilee in 1950.

William Vaughan Berkley became headmaster in 1952, and remained until 1969. In 1957, he appointed as English master the actor Anthony Corfield, who sustained an active programme in drama for more than thirty years. James Brown, who had been assistant head to Berkley, became headmaster in 1969. He wrote the history of the school, The First Five (meaning the first five headmasters), published in 1988. Brown was succeeded as headmaster by Christopher Syers-Gibson, D. H. M. Dalrymple, Ian Murphy, Andrew Auster, J. Griggs, and, in 1999, Christopher Black.

By the end of the twentieth century the school was coeducational and included a nursery, kindergarten and pre-prep as well as the original preparatory school.

Alastair Ramsay became the next headmaster and, in 2008, the school merged with Malvern College prep school, on The Downs' existing site. The name was changed to The Downs Malvern to reflect its new stewardship. In September 2009 Alastair Cook became headmaster.

Andy Nuttall became Headmaster of The Downs Malvern in May 2020.

The Downian Society draws its membership from former pupils, employees and associates of the school.

== W. H. Auden at the Downs ==
The poet W. H. Auden spent three years teaching English at The Downs during 1932–1935. He returned for the summer term in 1937 when the English master was away. He was loved as one of the more extravagant and eccentric teachers, who supplemented his teaching of English by teaching pupils how to make spitballs stick to the ceiling.

He helped to found the school magazine The Badger in 1933, and his contributions to it included poems about school personalities. He continued to contribute occasionally after he left the school. In 1935 he wrote, composed, and organised a musical revue, in which the entire school took part, and reused some of the lyrics in his play The Dog Beneath the Skin. In 1937 he wrote a preface to the catalogue of an exhibition in a London gallery of paintings by present and former members of the school. Auden lived at the school in a cottage that he named "Lawrence Villa" (one of his allusions to D. H. Lawrence). During the summer term, he used to sleep out on the lawn; thus the opening line of his poem "Out on the lawn I lie in bed".

Benjamin Britten, Hedli Anderson and William Coldstream visited Auden at the school several times to work on their collaboration for the GPO Film Unit, and to perform music and teach art to the pupils.

Among the poems that Auden wrote at the Downs were Hearing of harvests; his evocation of his Vision of Agape in June 1933, Out on the lawn I lie in bed (later dedicated to Geoffrey Hoyland); Our hunting fathers; Look, stranger; and, during his return in 1937, the despairing Schoolchildren. He was particularly taken with one of his pupils, Michael Yates, with whom he fell in love for some years and later maintained a lifelong friendship. Auden's time at The Downs was one of the happiest periods in his life.

The epigraph to Auden's posthumously published play The Chase (written in 1935) was a poem by a Downs pupil, John Bowes, which had been mocked by the other pupils in Auden's class. Auden rebuked them, saying that the poem was not only satisfactory but that he would use it in his next book. Bowes and Auden corresponded in later years, and Auden stayed with Bowes and his wife in Cheltenham in 1972.

== Downs Light Railway ==
The Downs Light Railway is a distinctive feature of the school. This miniature-gauge railway was begun in 1925 and, complete with a tunnel under Brockhill Road and a station, is situated within the school grounds. It maintains working engines under both steam and petrol power and is used as an extra-curricular activity to teach pupils a range of skills.

== Former pupils ==
- Derek Bangham (1924–2008), research scientist
- James I. C. Boyd (1921–2009), railway historian
- Gurney Braithwaite, Conservative politician
- John Crabtree, lawyer and businessman; Lord Lieutenant of the West Midlands
- Patrick George, painter
- Sir Lawrence Gowing, painter
- W. Brian Harland (1917-2003), geologist
- Sir Alan Hodgkin, neuroscientist and Nobel laureate
- Humphrey Kay (1923–2009), pathologist and haematologist
- Peter Parker, author and journalist
- Drummond Hoyle Matthews, geologist and marine geophysicist
- Will Merrick, actor
- Lionel Penrose, medical expert and mathematician
- Roland Penrose (1900 – 1984), artist, historian and poet.
- Frederick Sanger, biochemist and the fourth person to become a double Nobel Laureate
- A. J. P. Taylor, historian
- Donald Wright, schoolmaster
- Michael Yates, television designer
