= Elinor Bellingham-Smith =

British painter

- Born: 28 December 1906; London, England
- Died: 4 November 1988 (aged 81); Ipswich, England
- Known for: Painter
- Spouse: Rodrigo Moynihan (m. 1931; div. 1960)
- Children: 1

Elinor Bellingham-Smith (28 December 1906 – 4 November 1988) was a British painter of landscapes and still life. Her paintings are in the collections of Tate, Museums Sheffield, the Government Art Collection, Arts Council Collection and other museums and galleries.

== Early life ==
Elinor Bellingham-Smith was born in London on 28 December 1906 to Guy and Ellen (Nell) Buxton Bellingham-Smith, who were married in 1901. Her father, a registrar, surgeon and obstetrician at Guy's Hospital, collected drawings and prints and published a catalog of his collection, including Old Master drawings and those of Evelyn L. Englehearts and Thomas R. Berney. The painter Hugh Bellingham-Smith was her uncle.

She had an older brother and sister. Bellingham-Smith was a proficient ballet dancer and pianist. She gave up dancing, though, following an injury. Bellingham-Smith studied at the Slade School of Fine Art beginning in 1928. In 1931 she finished her studies at the Slade and married the English painter Rodrigo Moynihan.

== Career ==
Works by Bellingham-Smith were exhibited in 1931 at the London Group. In 1948 she had a solo exhibition at Leicester Galleries (Note: It was the first of seven exhibitions at Leicester Galleries. She exhibited: October 1948, November 1952, April 1956, February 1959, April 1962, March 1965, and March 1967.) and began exhibiting at the Royal Academy of Art. She painted primarily landscapes and still life. She worked for both Harper's Bazaar and Shell as an illustrator. She illustrated the children's book Candlelight Tales by Alison Uttley (Faber & Faber, 1936).

For the 1951 Festival of Britain the Arts Council commissioned 60 painters to make large paintings, 114 by 152 centimetres (45 by 60 in) or more, to be displayed at the festival. There were also 12 commissioned sculptors. Ultimately the works were given to new hospitals, libraries, schools, and health centres that emerged after the war. There were five cash prizes awarded and Bellingham-Smith took one of the prizes with The Island.

M. H. Middleton reviewed the Leicester Galleries exhibition of Bellingham-Smith's paintings in November 1952:

Miss Bellingham-Smith's wistful, gentle paintings, on the other hand, delicately touched in with sad grey-greens, tug at the heart like memories of childhood. Her little girls have a lyrical elegance, as though Susanne Eisendieck had been crossed with Kate Greenaway. Her unpeopled landscapes evoke the enjoyable melancholy of the return from the Sunday afternoon walk with the dog, when there was rain in the sky and the wind lifted the birds from the meadow like the last leaves from the trees, and one thought of the fire in the nursery and crumpets for tea.

— M.H. Middleton

Later in life, The Fens and East Anglia were featured in many of Bellingham-Smith's landscapes. During her career she exhibited at the Women's International Art Club.

== Personal life ==
Bellingham-Smith and Moynihan had a son, John, who was born in 1932. The family had a governess for John and a cleaning lady for the upkeep of their home on Old Church Street. Bellingham-Smith and her husband had a busy social life. Their home became a salon to writers and other artists. In 1946, Princess Elizabeth was accompanied by her mother to the house six times to sit for Moynihan, who had been commissioned to make her portrait.

Their evenings were often spent smoking and drinking in restaurants, bars, clubs or at parties. When he turned 20, John went along with them on their evenings out. John wrote the book The Restless Lives: The Bohemian World of Rodrigo and Elinor Moynihan.

Their social life and Moynihan's affairs took a toll on the marriage. They separated in 1957 and divorced in 1960.

From about 1958, she lived in Boxford, Suffolk and died on 4 November 1988 in Ipswich.

== Works ==
- A London Garden, Derbyshire & Derby School Library Service
- Brambles, Tullie House Museum and Art Gallery
- Bullrushes, Museums Sheffield
- Burning Stubble, Maidstone Museum & Art Gallery
- Dragon-Flies, 1947–48, Tate
- Essex Field in Summer, oil on canvas, about 1950. Sold at Christie's in 2002.
- Fields above Boxford, Government Art Collection
- Girls by the River, Newport Museum and Art Gallery
- Hedgerow, Government Art Collection
- Low Tide, Putney, Wolverhampton Arts and Heritage
- River Scene with Figures, Aberdeen Art Gallery & Museums
- Sunset, Arts Council Collection
- The Bonfire, Government Art Collection
- The Fenn, Boxford, Arts Council Collection
- The Island, Arts Council Collection
- The Log, oil on canvas. Sold at Christie's in 2006.
- The Sky over Wattisham, Arts Council Collection
- The Tabby Cat, oil on canvas, by 1949. Sold at Christie's in 1997.
- The Willow Tree, Harris Museum & Art Gallery
- Winter Afternoon, Arts Council Collection
