= Atelier Lacourière-Frélaut =

- Industry: print publisher
- Founded: 1929; 96 years ago in Paris, France
- Founder: Roger Lacourière
- Defunct: 2008
- Headquarters: Paris, France

The Atelier Lacourière-Frélaut was a printer specializing in fine printmaking in Paris. In the 1930s the Atelier produced prints for Pablo Picasso and Henri Matisse.

It was founded by Roger Lacourière (1892–1966) in 1929. The establishment was taken over by Jacques Frélaut when Lacourière retired in 1957.

In 1979 the Musée d'Art Moderne de Paris held the 50th anniversary retrospective "L'Atelier Lacourière-Frélaut ou 50 ans de gravures et d'impressions en taille-douce 1929-1979". Among the British artists printed by the studio is Sylvia Finzi, whose artist's book with the poet Jeremy Adler intitled "Notes from the Correspondence" was published in 1983.

The Atelier closed in 2008.
