= Lawrence Gowing =

English artist (1918–1991)

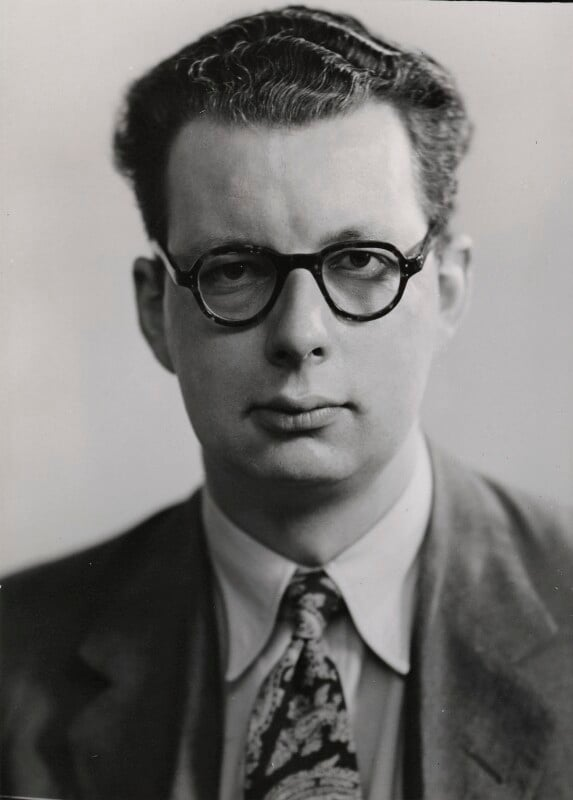
Gowing in 1952

Sir Lawrence Burnett Gowing CBE RA (21 April 1918 – 5 February 1991) was an English artist, writer, curator and teacher. Initially recognised as a portrait and landscape painter, he quickly rose to prominence as an art educator, writer, and eventually, curator and museum trustee. He was described as a prominent member of the "English Establishment". As a student of art history he was largely self-taught.

== Early life ==
Born in Hackney, East London to Horace Gowing, a draper, and his wife, Louise, his first painting of note, Mare Street, Hackney, made reference to his father's shop. After attending Quaker schools Downs School at Colwall, Herefordshire and Leighton Park School, in 1938 he worked with William Coldstream at the Euston Road School; Coldstream was a friend for life. He was a conscientious objector during World War II.

== Career ==
In the 1940s he became recognised as a painter, and for the rest of his life was sought after to paint casual but quintessential portraits of the eminent, among whom were Clement Attlee, Lord Halifax, Veronica Wedgwood and Edgar Adrian. At the same time he continued a lifelong practice of open-air landscape painting that he learned from Maurice Feild at school. He was a protege of the Bloomsbury art critic Clive Bell.

Gowing began teaching in 1948, first as Professor of Fine Art at King's College, University of Durham (now the University of Newcastle upon Tyne) from 1948 to 1958, then as Principal of Chelsea School of Art from 1958 to 1965, as Professor of Fine Art at the University of Leeds from 1967 to 1975, finally serving as Principal of the Slade School of Fine Art at University College London from 1975 to 1985. Concurrently, he authored a number of art monographs and catalogues on masters such as Vermeer, William Hogarth, J. M. W. Turner, Cézanne, Matisse, and Lucian Freud. Among the major exhibitions he organized were those for Turner at the Museum of Modern Art in 1966, Matisse in New York in 1966 and London in 1968, and Cézanne, which traveled in 1988-89 from the Royal Academy to the Musée d'Orsay and the National Gallery of Art.

Gowing was a trustee of the Tate Gallery, the National Portrait Gallery, and the British Museum, and was a member of the Arts Council of Great Britain. In 1978, he was elected an associate of the Royal Academy of Arts, and was made honorary curator of its collections in 1985. In the 1980s he travelled to the United States to serve as Kress Professor at the National Gallery in Washington, D.C., and was also curator of the Phillips Collection in Washington. Knighted in the 1982 Birthday Honours, he was made a chevalier in the Order of Arts and Letters in France in 1985.

Gowing also received an Honorary Doctorate from Heriot-Watt University in 1980.

== Family ==
After a long partnership and marriage with the writer Julia Strachey, a member of the Bloomsbury Group, he married Jenny Wallis in 1967. They had three daughters.

== Collections ==
Gowing's daughter donated his personal archive to University College London in 2018 and 2023. The archive includes correspondence relating to Gowing's work, lecture notes, and personal papers. Julia Strachey's papers are also held at University College London, primarily donated by Gowing; the collection includes extensive personal correspondence, personalia, and notebooks and diaries.

== Death ==
Gowing died of heart failure at the age of 73.
