= Adrian Stokes (critic) =

British art critic (1902–1972)

- Born: 27 October 1902
- Died: 15 December 1972 (aged 70)
- Education: Magdalen College, Oxford
- Occupations: Writer, painter, art critic

Adrian Durham Stokes (27 October 1902 – 15 December 1972) was a British art critic with a speciality in early Renaissance sculpture and the aesthetics of stone-carving. He helped to turn the traditional Cornish fishing-port of St. Ives into an internationally acclaimed centre of modern art.

== Early life ==
Born on 27 October 1902 into a wealthy stockbroker family living in London, Adrian Stokes was the youngest of his parents' three children. After public school, Rugby, he studied philosophy at Magdalen College, Oxford, graduating, B.A. 1923, with second-class results in his examinations (excelling in philosophy but refusing to submit ancillary scripts in German and maths). Stokes then travelled around the world. He incorporated some of his resulting diary and reflections into his first book, The Thread of Ariadne (1925), publication of which led to his introduction to Osbert Sitwell, and to the art of Early Renaissance Italy and to the avant-garde creations of the Ballets Russes, both of which Stokes applauded in his next book, Sunrise in the West (1926).

== Carving aesthetic ==
Stokes's first major achievements began after he met modernist poet, Ezra Pound in November 1926, and after he started analysis with Melanie Klein, in January 1930. Stokes evolved an innovative aesthetic in the first two of his major books of the 1930s - The Quattro Cento (1932) and Stones of Rimini (1934). In The Quattro Cento he characterized the intense Early Renaissance feeling for material and space as 'mass-effect' and 'stone-blossom'. The stone—deeply respected as a medium – is, he said, 'carved to flower' thereby bringing to the surface the fantasies the artist reads in its depths. Noted art critic Paul George Konody described the book as "remarkable and enthralling", and said that Stokes "makes words blossom as the marble blossomed under the chisel of some Renaissance sculptor".

Stones of Rimini (1934) tightens and focuses these organicist themes, further analyzes the artistic process, and establishes thereby one of Stokes's most central themes: the duality of 'carving-modelling'. A fine 'carver' allows the form to come to life through the medium of the stone; the 'modeller' - on the other hand - sees the medium as so much stuff on which to impose a preconceived idea. In the contemporary art of the 1930s Stokes found these 'carving' qualities in the work of Ben Nicholson, Barbara Hepworth, and Henry Moore, whose Modernism he championed in articles in The Spectator. As a lover of ballet and a ballet-critic Stokes also promoted the avant-garde creations of the Ballets Russes in two further books: To-Night the Ballet (1934) and Russian Ballets (1935). Following the end of his analysis in 1935 he learnt to paint, joined the Euston Road school of art, and extended his carving-modelling aesthetic to painting in his seventh book, Colour and Form (1937).

== Transforming St Ives ==
In 1938 Stokes married and moved with his artist wife, Margaret Mellis, to live in Carbis Bay, [St Ives, Cornwall] where their son Telfer was born. Meanwhile—through bringing Ben Nicholson and Barbara Hepworth, and, with them, Naum Gabo, to St Ives in 1939 – Stokes became the main catalyst of the town's transformation into an internationally acclaimed centre of modern art. During World War II he worked as a market gardener and for the Home Guard. Alongside this work he completed a further Early Italian Renaissance book, Venice (1945). He also wrote an autobiographical book, Inside Out (1947), in which he drew on material from his psychoanalysis to which he added reflections about the art of Cézanne.

== Psychoanalytic aesthetic ==
Inside Out (1947) was published after Stokes left St Ives for London. This period in his life ended with divorce from Margaret after which Stokes married her younger sister, the ceramic artist Ann Stokes, with whom he had two children, Philip and Ariadne.

In the following years he drew on the work of Klein and other psychoanalysts in reformulating his previous carving-modelling aesthetic in terms of 'depressive' and 'paranoid-schizoid' states of mind. This featured in his book, Smooth and Rough (1951), and was much more developed in his next book, Michelangelo (1955) now published by Tavistock. Between the date of the Michelangelo publication to 1967 he published 6 books with Tavistock. At the same time Stokes helped and contributed papers to the 'Imago Group' which met regularly for nearly eighteen years to discuss applications of psychoanalysis to philosophy, politics, ethics, and aesthetics. A year after his death in 1972 these papers were published by Carcanet in the book, A Game That Must Be Lost (1973) which remains one of the most fitting tributes to his life's work.

== Works ==
- The Thread of Ariadne. London: Kegan Paul, Trench, Trubner, 1925
- Sunrise in the West. London: Kegan Paul, Trench, Trubner, 1926
- The Quattro Cento. London: Faber & Faber, 1932
- The Stones of Rimini. London: Faber & Faber, 1934
- Tonight the Ballet, London: Faber & Faber, 1934
- The Russian Ballets, London: Faber & Faber, 1935
- Colour and Form. London: Faber & Faber, 1937
- Venice: An Aspect of Art. London: Faber & Faber, 1945
- Cézanne. London: Faber & Faber, 1947
- Inside Out. London: Faber & Faber, 1947
- Art and Science. London: Faber & Faber, 1949
- Smooth and Rough. London: Faber & Faber, 1951
- Michelangelo: A Study in the Nature of Art. London: Tavistock, 1955
- Raphael. London: Faber & Faber, 1956
- Greek Culture and the Ego. London: Tavistock, 1958
- Monet. London: Faber & Faber, 1958
- Three Essays on the Painting of our Time. London: Tavistock, 1961
- Painting and the Inner World. London: Tavistock, 1963.
- The Invitation in Art. London: Tavistock, 1965. Preface by Richard Wollheim.
- Venice (illustrated by John Piper). London: Duckworth, 1965
- Reflections on the Nude. London: Tavistock, 1967
- The Image in Form. Ed. R. Wollheim. London: Penguin Books, 1972
- A Game That Must Be Lost. Ed. E. Rhode. Cheadle: Carcanet, 1973
- Penguin Modern Poets 21. Ed. S. Spender. London: Penguin Books, 1973
- The Critical Writings of Adrian Stokes. Ed. L. Gowing. London: Thames and Hudson, 1978
- With All the Views: The Collected Poems of Adrian Stokes. Ed. P. Robinson. Manchester: Carcanet, 1981
- Art and Analysis: An Adrian Stokes Reader. Ed. M. Harris Williams, London: Karnac Books, 2014
