= Claude Rogers (artist) =

English painter and art educator (1907-1979)

- Born: 27 January 1907; London, England
- Died: 18 February 1979 (aged 72); London, England
- Education: Slade School of Art
- Known for: Painting, art education
- Spouse: Elsie Few

Claude Maurice Rogers OBE (27 January 1907 – 18 February 1979) was a British painter of portraits and landscapes, an influential art teacher, a founding member of the Euston Road School and at one time the President of the London Group of British artists.

== Life and work ==
Rogers was born in London but spent his childhood in Buenos Aires. He attended the Slade School of Art between 1925 and 1929, where he won a scholarship to study in Paris throughout 1930. He returned to Britain in 1931 and lived in the Norwegian Seamen's Mission building in Gravesend. He joined the London Artists' Association in 1931 and had his first exhibition with them in 1933. Rogers obtained a teaching appointment in 1935 at Raynes Park in London. In 1937 he married Elsie Few, a fellow artist. Rogers was one of the original members of the, short-lived but highly influential, Euston Road School in 1937. He taught at their original premises in Fitzroy Street and, from February 1938, at the Euston Road location that gave the group its name. Also, in 1938 he became a member of the London Group and held a solo show at the Leicester Galleries in 1940. Membership of the New English Art Club followed in 1943.

During the Second World War Rogers served in the Royal Engineers until he was injured in 1943. He continued to paint and received a commission from the War Artists' Advisory Committee in May 1942 for a picture. He also painted Janet Vaughan in her role as principal of Somerville College, Oxford. After the war Rogers, and other former members of the Euston Road school, taught at the Camberwell School of Art. Two exhibitions resulted, The Euston Road School and others in May 1948 and a group retrospective which the Arts Council toured in 1948 and 1949. Rodgers worked at Camberwell until 1950 and then taught at the Slade until 1963, when he became the Professor of Fine Art at the University of Reading, a post he held until 1972. Rogers had been the President of the London Group between 1952 and 1955. From 1956 onwards Rogers and his wife owned a property at Somerton in Suffolk and they both painted landscapes in the area. In 1959 Rogers was appointed OBE.

Works by Claude Rogers are held in the collections of the Tate, the National Portrait Gallery, the National Trust, the Arts Council Collection and in the UK Government art collection. A major retrospective of Roger's work was held at the Whitechapel Art Gallery in 1973 and another at the Ben Uri Gallery during 1992 and 1993. A joint Rogers and Few exhibition was held in 2002 at the Belgrave Gallery.
