= Rodrigo Moynihan =

British artist (1910–1990)

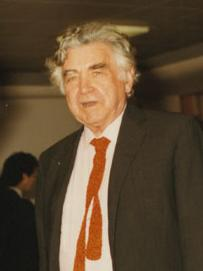
- Rodrigo Moynihan, 1984
- Born: 17 October 1910; Santa Cruz de Tenerife, Canary Islands
- Died: 6 November 1990 (aged 80); London
- Education: Slade School of Fine Art
- Known for: Painting, printmaking
- Notable work: Portraits of Margaret Thatcher, Peggy Ashcroft
- Movement: Euston Road School
- Spouses: Elinor Bellingham-Smith (m. 1931, divorced) Anne Dunn (m. 1960)
- Children: 2
- Elected: Royal Academy 1954

(Herbert George) Rodrigo Moynihan RA (17 October 1910 – 6 November 1990) was an English painter, credited with being a pioneer of abstract painting in England.

== Early life ==
Moynihan was born in Santa Cruz de Tenerife, Canary Islands, in 1910, to Herbert James Moynihan, a fruit broker from County Cork, and Maria (née de la Puerta). His Anglo-Spanish family moved to London in 1918 and then to Wisconsin. A winter in Rome 1927–1928 inspired him to devote himself to art, and in 1928 he started studying at the Slade School of Fine Art in London.

In the 1930s he gained a reputation as a pioneer of abstract painting in England as a member of the Objective Abstraction movement. Moynihan was later attracted to social realism and became associated from 1937 with the Euston Road School.

== Wartime camoufleur, war artist ==
Moynihan served in the British Army from 1940 to 1943, first in the Royal Artillery and then doing camouflage work. Following an injury, he was given a full-time salaried commission by the War Artists' Advisory Committee, WAAC, having previously completed a number of short-term contracts for the Committee. He completed a number of portraits of ATS and senior, male, military figures for this contract and also for subsequent shorter WAAC contracts Moynihan was appointed an Associate Member of the Royal Academy in 1944.

== Postwar career ==
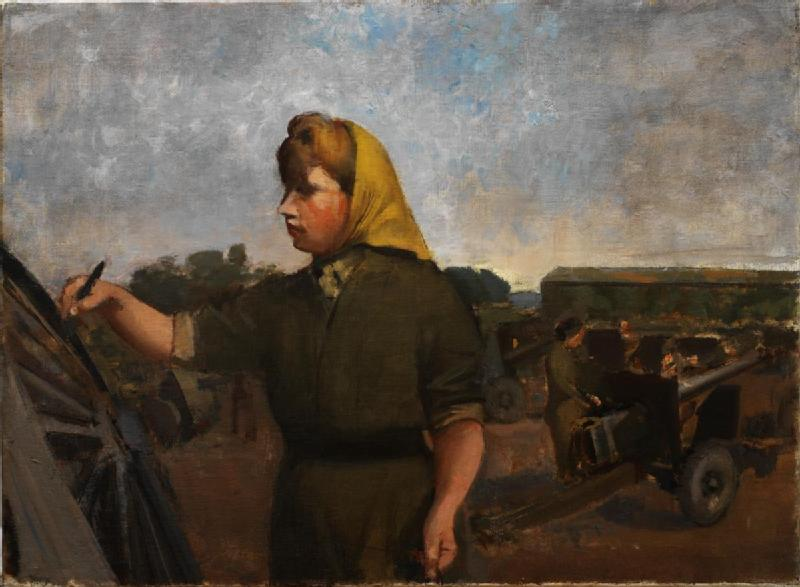
ATS at Work, (1943)

After the war, he was professor of painting at the Royal College of Art 1948–1957, and was elected a full member of the Royal Academy in 1954. At this period, he was in demand for official portraits, and executed commissions of amongst others Princess Elizabeth (1946) and Prime Minister Clement Attlee (1947). He changed direction from 1957, resigning from the Royal College of Art and the Royal Academy and returning to abstraction, working outside England in Europe and North America.

From 1971 onwards he was inspired to return to figurative painting in the form of large-scale studio still-lives, unordered, unarranged and apparently random. One of these such paintings was, The shelf, objects and shadows - front view (1982–83). This return to figuration also drew him to move back towards portraiture – with portraits of friends leading to renewed commissions by the end of the 1970s. Notable portraits of this period include Prime Minister Margaret Thatcher (1983–85; National Portrait Gallery, London) and Dame Peggy Ashcroft (1984; National Portrait Gallery).

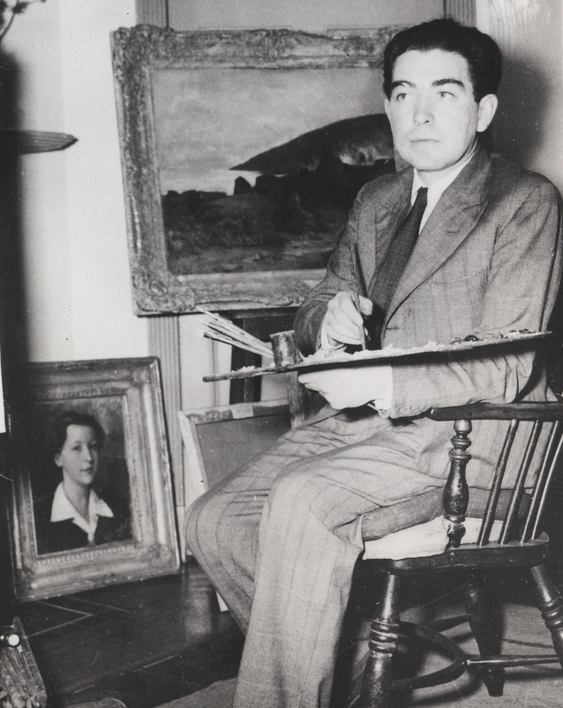
Rodrigo Moynihan in 1946

== Awards and distinctions ==
Moynihan was re-elected to the Royal Academy in 1979. He has paintings in the collection of several British institutions including the Glasgow Museums, Derby Art Gallery and in the Imperial War Museum.

== Family life ==
Moynihan married artist Elinor Bellingham-Smith in 1931. They had one son, John Moynihan. They divorced in the late 1950s, and in 1960 he married fellow-artist Anne Dunn with whom he had a second son Daniel "Danny" Moynihan. They went to live in the south of France.
