= Euston Road School =

Painting movement in 20th-century London

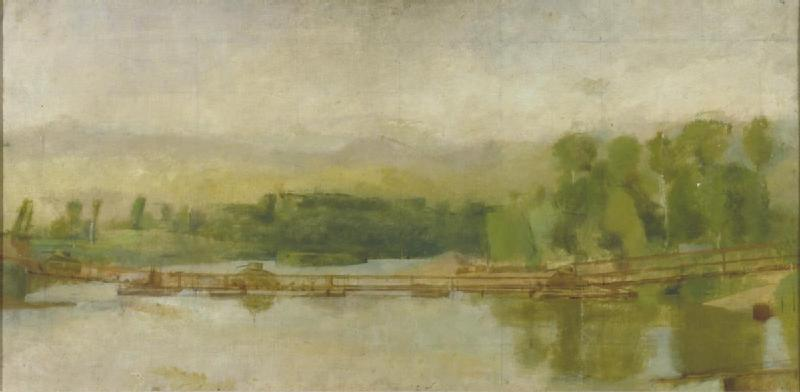
The Bailey Bridge built by Royal Engineers over the Volturno River, Italy; William Coldstream as a war artist

The Euston Road School is a term applied to a group of English painters, active either as staff or students at the School of Drawing and Painting in London between 1937 and 1939. The School opened in October 1937 at premises in Fitzroy Street before moving to 314/316 Euston Road in February 1938. The School was founded by William Coldstream, Victor Pasmore and Claude Rogers. Graham Bell was a substantial theoretical influence on these teachers and Rodrigo Moynihan was also closely associated with the School. Students at the school included Lawrence Gowing, Thomas Carr (artist), Peter Lanyon, Vivien John and Thelma Hulbert. The writer Adrian Stokes and the poet Stephen Spender attended drawing classes. Vanessa Bell and Duncan Grant were among visiting teachers to the School.

The emphasis was on acute representational painting based on observation. The School emphasised naturalism and realism, in contrast to the various schools of avant-garde art then prevalent. Many of the members were on the political left, and naturalism was seen as an attempt to make art more relevant and understandable to non-specialists and members of the public. To this end, Bell and Coldstream spent three weeks in working-class lodgings in Bolton, Lancashire in April 1938 painting cityscapes showing local factories. The resulting paintings were not highly regarded locally in Bolton. Later in 1938, the Euston Road artists contributed to the Fifteen paintings of London exhibition held at the Storran Gallery. In an attempt to engage the wider public, private invitations were sent to everyone named Brown, in the Post Office telephone directory.

The School closed at the start of the Second World War, as its members joined the Armed Forces, worked as war artists or, in the case of Pasmore, were imprisoned for being a conscientious objector. A small exhibition, Members of the Euston Road group was held at the Ashmolean Museum in 1942. In 1945 Pasmore, Coldstream, Rogers and Gowing were all teaching at the Camberwell School of Art and two further exhibitions followed, The Euston Road School and others at the Wakefield Art Gallery in 1948 and a group retrospective organised by the Arts Council which toured Britain throughout 1948 and 1949. By the end of 1949 the artists had embarked on separate projects, with Coldstream leaving Camberwell for the Slade School of Art.
