= Victor Pasmore =

British artist & architect (1908–1998)

Victor Pasmore CH, CBE
- Born: 3 December 1908; Chelsham, Surrey, England
- Died: 23 January 1998 (aged 89); Gudja, Malta
- Education: Harrow School
- Alma mater: Central School of Art
- Style: Abstraction, Constructivism
- Spouse: Wendy Blood
- Children: 2
- Awards: 1961 Venice Biennale

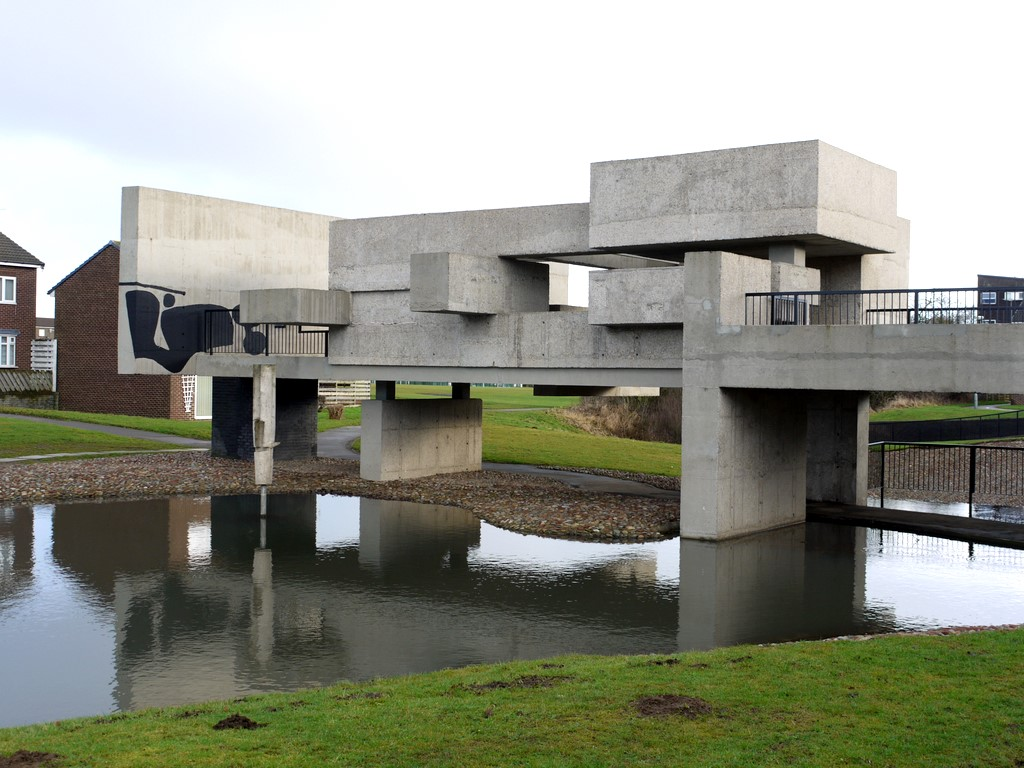
'Apollo Pavilion', Peterlee by Pasmore

Edwin John Victor Pasmore, CH, CBE (3 December 1908 – 23 January 1998) was a British artist. He pioneered the development of abstract art in Britain in the 1940s and 1950s.

== Early life ==
Pasmore was born in Chelsham, Surrey, on 3 December 1908. He studied at Summer Fields School in Oxford and Harrow in west London, but with the death of his father in 1927 he was forced to take an administrative job at the London County Council. He studied painting part-time at the Central School of Art and was associated with the formation of the Euston Road School. After experimenting with abstraction, Pasmore worked for a time in a lyrical figurative style, painting views of the River Thames from Hammersmith much in the style of Turner and Whistler.

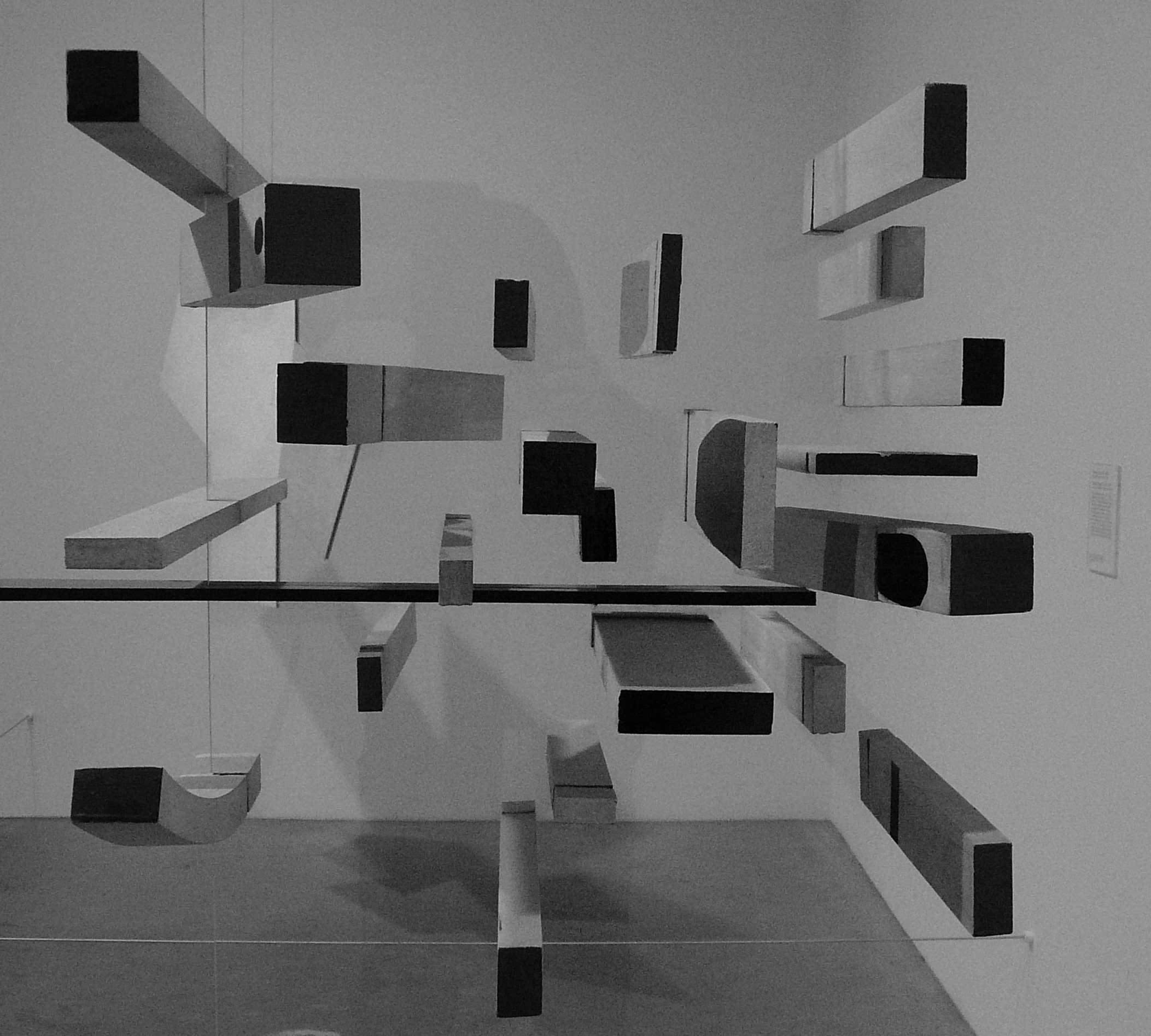
Abstract by Pasmore

In the Second World War, Pasmore was a conscientious objector. Having been refused recognition by his Local Tribunal, he was called up for military service in 1942. He refused orders and was court martialled and sentenced to 123 days imprisonment. The sentence qualified him to go to the Appellate Tribunal in Edinburgh, which allowed him unconditional exemption from military service.

== Artistic career ==
=== The figurative years: 1927–1947 ===
One of the first exhibitions in which his works feature was held at the Zwemmer gallery, London 1934. His works were influenced by Monet and Cézanne.

=== The break into abstraction (1948–1954) ===
His break into abstract art was inspired by the artists Piet Mondrian and Paul Klee. Their writings feature nature and the creation of a dynamic harmony in art which stood for the future harmony of society.

Beginning in 1947, he developed a purely abstract style under the influence of Ben Nicholson and other artists associated with Circle, becoming a pioneering figure of the revival of interest in Constructivism in Britain following the War. Pasmore's abstract work, often in collage and construction of reliefs, pioneered the use of new materials and was sometimes on a large architectural scale. Herbert Read described Pasmore's new style as "The most revolutionary event in post-war British art".

In 1950, he was commissioned to design an abstract mural for a bus depot in Kingston upon Thames and the following year Pasmore contributed a mural to the Festival of Britain that promoted a number of the British Constructivists.

Pasmore was a supporter of fellow artist Richard Hamilton, giving him a teaching job in Newcastle and contributing a constructivist structure to the exhibition This Is Tomorrow in collaboration with Ernő Goldfinger and Helen Phillips. Pasmore was commissioned to make a mural for the new Newcastle Civic Centre. His interest in the synthesis of art and architecture was given free hand when he was appointed Consulting Director of Architectural Design for Peterlee development corporation in 1955. Pasmore's choices in this area proved controversial; the centerpiece of the town design became an abstract public art structure of his design, the Apollo Pavilion. The structure became the focus for local criticism over the failures of the Development Corporation but Pasmore remained a defender of his work, returning to the town to face critics of the Pavilion at a public meeting in 1982. After many years of neglect the work was restored in 2009 with a grant from the Heritage Lottery Fund.

Pasmore represented Britain at the 1961 Venice Biennale, was participating artist at the Documenta II 1959 in Kassel and was a trustee of the Tate Gallery, donating a number of works to the collection. He gave a lecture on J.M.W. Turner as 'first of the moderns' to the Turner Society, of which he was elected a vice president in 1975.

== Teaching: 1937–1961 ==
Pasmore was a leading figure in the promotion of abstract art and reform of the fine art education system. From 1943–1949, he taught at Camberwell School of Art where one of his students was Terry Frost whom he advised not to bother with the School's formal teaching and to instead study the works in the National Gallery.

Between 1950 and 1954 Pasmore taught at the Central School of Art.

From 1954 to 1961 he taught at Kings College, University of Durham, in Newcastle upon Tyne (now Newcastle University). There he developed a radical art and design course inspired by the 'basic course' of the Bauhaus that became the model for higher arts education across the UK. He was succeeded by Richard Hamilton.

== Personal life ==
In 1940, he married the artist Wendy Blood. They had two children, a son and a daughter. He moved to Malta in 1966. He died in Gudja, Malta, on 23 January 1998, aged 89.

== Legacy ==
On 3 November 2014, the Central Bank of Malta, in collaboration with the Victor Pasmore Foundation, inaugurated the Victor Pasmore Gallery in the Central Bank's premises at the Polverista Gallery. This gallery houses a permanent exhibition of works discovered in Pasmore's home in Gudja, Malta and also in his residence in Blackheath, London. The exhibition consists primarily of paintings and constructions created while the artist lived in Malta.

== See also ==
- Abstract painting - 1998 painting by Pasmore

== Sources ==
- The Times, 1 September 1942.
