= William Coldstream =

English painter and art teacher (1908–1987)

Sir William Coldstream CBE
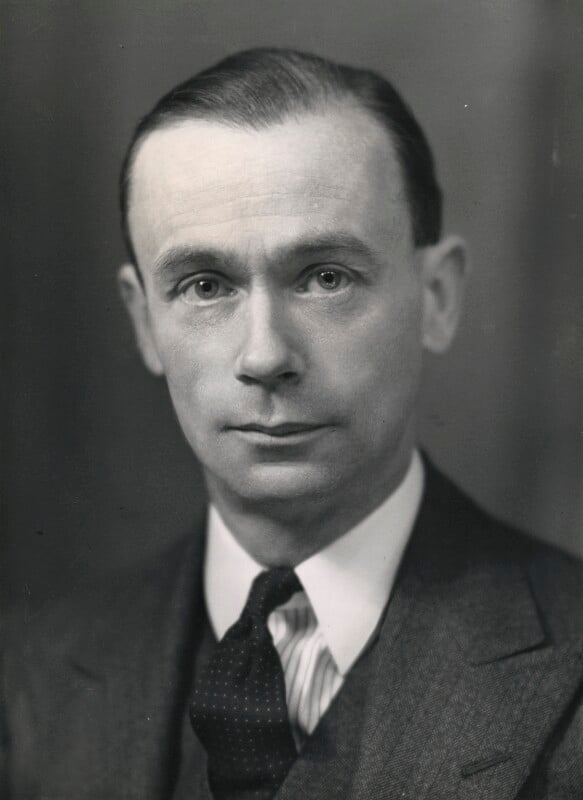
- Coldstream in 1953
- Born: William Menzies Coldstream; 28 February 1908; Belford, Northumberland, England
- Died: 18 February 1987 (aged 78); London, England
- Education: Slade School of Fine Art
- Occupations: Painter, art teacher
- Known for: Painting, drawing
- Spouses: Nancy Sharp (m. 1931; div. 1942) Monica Hoyer (m. 1960)
- Children: 5
- Relatives: Nicholas Coldstream (cousin)
- Awards: CBE 1952; Knighted 1956

Sir William Menzies Coldstream, CBE (28 February 1908 – 18 February 1987) was an English realist painter and a long-standing art teacher.

== Biography ==
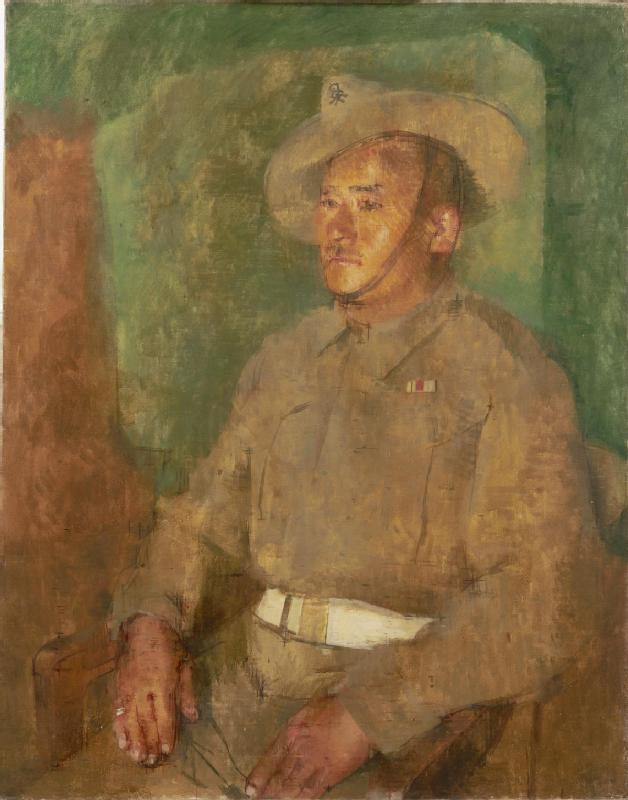
Kulbir Thapa had won the Victoria Cross in 1915 "For most conspicuous bravery during operations against the German trenches South of Manquisart." (Art.IWM ART LD3992)

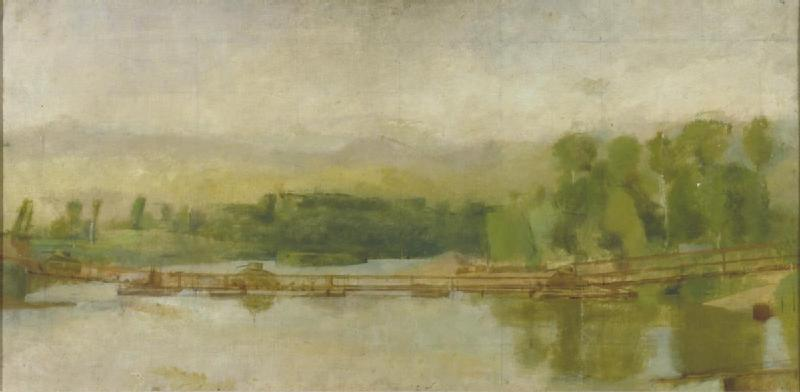
The Bailey Bridge built by Royal Engineers over the Volturno River, Italy

Coldstream was born at Belford, Northumberland, in northern England, the second son of country doctor George Probyn Coldstream and his wife Susan Jane Lilian, daughter of Maj. Robert Mercer-Tod, of the 43rd Regiment.

His mother's family were Scottish landed gentry. He grew up in London, where he was privately educated, then studied at the Slade School of Fine Art between 1926 and 1929. In 1931, he joined the London Artists' Association and then, two years later, the London Group.

In 1934, Coldstream joined the GPO Film Unit to make documentary films with John Grierson. During his time with the GPO, Coldstream worked alongside W. H. Auden, Benjamin Britten and Barnett Freedman but also continued to paint. In 1937, with some financial support from Kenneth Clark, Coldstream returned to painting on a full-time basis. Later that year, he co-founded the Euston Road School with Graham Bell, Victor Pasmore and Claude Rogers, having previously been involved in the short-lived objective abstraction movement.

Notable among Coldstream's paintings of this period is the portrait of Inez Pearn (at that time married to Stephen Spender), which has been called "a masterpiece of analytical realism" and was said to have needed some forty sittings. Coldstream's earlier years were characterised by a dedicated engagement with socialist ideals, and by the pursuit of a non-elitist form of art. To this end, he supported the Mass Observation social survey of Britain and participated in their 1938 painting trip to Bolton.

At the start of World War II, Coldstream enlisted in the Royal Artillery before transferring to the Royal Engineers. At first, he served as a gunner with a training regiment near Dover and then, from 1940 until 1943, was a camouflage officer with Camouflage Command in Farnham and later in Bristol.

In 1943, the War Artists Advisory Committee, WWAC, offered Coldstream a full-time commission, which he accepted, having previously declined to work for the Committee. He was stationed in Cairo with an Indian transport unit and painted four portraits of individuals there. From Cairo, he travelled to Italy, painting buildings in Capua, Rimini and Florence. Due to his slow means of working, Coldstream only produced nine pictures during his WAAC commission. He also painted Helen Darbishire in her role as principal of Somerville College, Oxford.

In November 1945, Coldstream became a visiting teacher at Camberwell School of Arts and Crafts, and later its professor. In 1949, he returned to lead the Slade School as principal, and professor of Fine Art. Under his direction the Slade achieved an international reputation.

In the 1952 Birthday Honours, he was appointed a CBE. In the 1956 Birthday Honours, Coldstream was knighted as a Knight Bachelor. Between 1958 and 1971, he was Chairman of the National Advisory Council on Art Education, which published its first report in 1960—called the "Coldstream Report"—outlining the requirements for a new Diploma in Art and Design (Dip.A.D.). Coldstream's proposals eventually led to more art school courses being given degree status.

Other administrative posts he held were as vice-chairman of the Arts Council, and as a director of the Royal Opera House, Covent Garden, and as a trustee of the National Gallery. He was also chairman of the British Film Institute from 1964 to 1971. In 1978, he was awarded the Sir Misha Black award and was added to the College of Medallists.

Coldstream retired from the Slade School in 1975, and continued to paint until 1984, when his health was in marked decline. He died in the Royal Homeopathic Hospital in London on 18 February 1987.

== Personal life ==
As a student at the Slade in 1931, Coldstream met and married Nancy Sharp. The marriage lasted until 1942, and produced two daughters. In 1960, he married his model, Monica Hoyer, and together they had three children, a boy and two girls. Coldstream's cousin, Nicolas Coldstream, was a leading archaeologist and academic.

== Method and works ==
Coldstream was committed to painting directly from life; he once remarked: "I lose interest unless I let myself be ruled by what I see." His type of realism had its basis in careful measurement, carried out by the following method: standing before the subject to be painted, a brush is held upright at arm's length. With one eye closed, the artist can, by sliding a thumb up or down the brush handle, take the measure of an object or interval. This finding is compared against other objects or intervals, with the brush still kept at arm's length. Informed by such measurements, the artist can paint what the eye sees without the use of conventional perspective. The surfaces of Coldstream's paintings carry many small horizontal and vertical markings, where he recorded these coordinates so that they could be verified against reality. As a result of his painstaking methods, Coldstream worked slowly, often taking scores of sittings over several months to complete a work. His subjects include still-life, landscapes (usually centred on architecture), portraits, and the female nude.
