= League of Nations Union =

British organisation

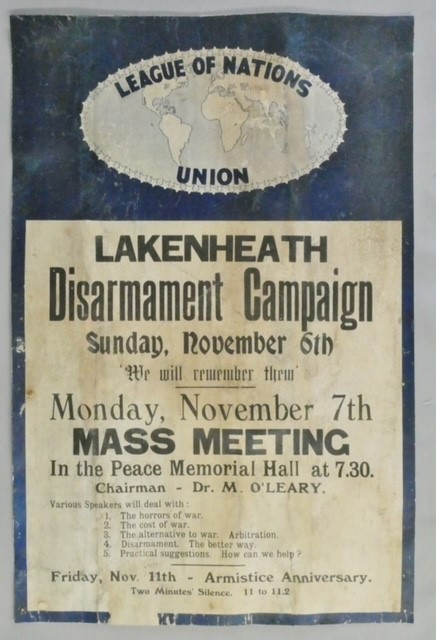
League of Nations Union, Lakenheath Disarmament Campaign poster of 1932

The League of Nations Union (LNU) was an organization formed in October 1918 in Great Britain to promote international justice, collective security and a permanent peace between nations based upon the ideals of the League of Nations. The League of Nations was established by the Great Powers as part of the Paris Peace Treaties, the international settlement that followed the First World War. The creation of a general association of nations was the final one of President Woodrow Wilson's Fourteen Points. The LNU became the largest and most influential organisation in the British peace movement. By the mid-1920s, it had over a quarter of a million registered subscribers and its membership eventually peaked at around 407,775 in 1931. By the 1940s, after the disappointments of the international crises of the 1930s and the descent into World War II, membership fell to about 100,000.

== Formation ==
The LNU was formed on 13 October 1918 by the merger of the League of Free Nations Association and the League of Nations Society, two older organisations already working for the establishment of a new and transparent system of international relations, human rights (as then understood) and for world peace through disarmament and universal collective security, rather than traditional approaches such as the balance of power and the creation of power blocs through secret treaties.

Chapters of the LNU were set up in the dominions and in allied nations, including in the capital cities of all of the states of Australia.

== Internal structure ==
The headquarters of the LNU were located variously at Buckingham Gate and Grosvenor Crescent, Belgravia. In the 1940s, it moved to smaller premises in St Martin's Lane, WC2, for reasons of economy.

Its top organ of administration was the General Council, which met twice a year and was responsible for LNU policy under its 1925 Royal Charter of Incorporation. Beneath the General Council sat the Executive Committee, which met every two weeks and co-ordinated all activities, such as the LNU's campaigns and educational programmes; received reports from branches; monitored the output of specialist sub-groups and had responsibility for the LNU's staff.

LNU branches had their own independent management structures.

== Activities ==
The LNU played an important role in inter-war politics. Hebe Spaull was the LNU's Press Officer for the last 17 of the inter-war years. According to one source it had been successful in converting the mainstream of British society, including labour, the churches and the principal newspapers, to the cause of the League of Nations. It also carried great influence in traditional political circles and particularly in the Liberal Party.

One historian has gone so far as to describe the LNU as "a key Liberal pressure group on foreign policy" and to call Liberal Party members the "true believers" of the LNU. Its first president was Edward Grey the Liberal foreign secretary during the First World War. Other leading Liberal lights in the LNU included Geoffrey Mander Liberal MP for Wolverhampton East from 1929 to 1945 and Professor Gilbert Murray, who was the Vice-President of the League of Nations Society from 1916 and Chairman of the LNU after 1923. The recruitment of Conservative politicians to support the LNU and the League of Nations itself was more problematic, but they pursued it to demonstrate the cross-party nature of the Union, which was important for the credibility of an organisation active politically in pursuit of international goals. High-profile Conservatives then came into the LNU, including Lord Robert Cecil and Austen Chamberlain who were both members of the LNU Executive Committee. However, most Conservatives were deeply suspicious of the LNU's support for pacifism and disarmament, an analogous position being the opinions held by Conservatives in the 1980s in respect of the Campaign for Nuclear Disarmament. Even Austen Chamberlain remarked that the Executive Committee contained "some of the worst cranks I have ever known". Winston Churchill said of the Union: "What impresses me most about them is their long suffering and inexhaustible gullibility".

=== Peace Ballot ===
One example of the significance of the political impact the LNU could have was its organisation of the Peace Ballot of 1935, when voters were asked to decide on questions relating to international disarmament and collective security. The Peace Ballot was not an official referendum, but more than eleven million people participated in it, representing strong support for the aims and objectives of the League of Nations, influencing policy makers and politicians. The results of the Peace Ballot were publicised worldwide. It has been suggested that one outcome was the interpretation of the result by the Axis powers as an indication of Britain's unwillingness to go to war on behalf of other nations although the vote for military action against international aggressors, as a matter of last resort, was almost three-to-one. The British politician, Phillip Noel-Baker spoke to the historian, Brian Harrison, about the Adelaide Livingstone's responsibilities in organising the peace ballot as part the Suffrage Interviews project, titled Oral evidence on the suffragette and suffragist movements: the Brian Harrison interviews.

=== Educational programmes ===
The LNU's other main activities were education and awareness raising. It provided publications, speakers and organised courses. Some of its programmes had a lasting impact on British schools.

== Replacement by United Nations Association ==
It was plain a new international settlement would be needed after the Second World War and in 1948, the United Nations Association of the United Kingdom (UNA-UK), member of WFUNA, was founded to promote the work of the United Nations Organisation, which was established in 1945 after the previous year's Dumbarton Oaks Conference. As a result, the LNU arranged for the transfer of its complete organisation and membership to the UNA. However, under the provisions of its Royal Charter, the LNU was able to continue until the mid-1970s in a limited capacity to handle bequests and administer the payment of pensions to former employees.

== Papers and records ==
The papers, records, minute books, pamphlets, reports and leaflets of the LNU are deposited at the British Library of Political and Economic Science at the London School of Economics in Westminster. Some digitised content from the LNU is available in the LSE's Digital Library.

== See also ==
- James Clerk Maxwell Garnett
- Council for Education in World Citizenship
- Goldsworthy Lowes Dickinson
- Henry Wilson Harris
- Charles Herbert Levermore
- Almeric Paget, 1st Baron Queenborough
- Dora West
- Adelaide Livingstone
