= Nan Youngman =

English painter

- Born: 28 June 1906; Maidstone, Kent
- Died: 17 April 1995 (aged 88); Cambridge
- Education: Slade School of Fine Art, London Day Training College
- Known for: Painting and art education

Nancy Mayhew Youngman OBE, (28 June 1906 – 17 April 1995), was an English painter and educationalist. Youngman is remembered primarily as a painter, but from before the war to the mid-1960s she was an influential figure in art education, as a teacher, an author and an impressively efficient organiser of exhibitions.

== Early life and education ==
Nan Youngman was born in Maidstone in 1906 to John Henry Youngman – a partner in the corn merchants Bradley, Taylor, and Youngman – and his wife, Adelaide Edith (Bida), née Marshall. She attended Wycombe Abbey School and then the Slade School of Art (1924–27), where she was taught by Philip Wilson Steer and Henry Tonks. During her time at the Slade she won a prize for life drawing.

After she left the Slade, Youngman went on to study for an art teacher's diploma at the London Day Training College. There she was taught by Marion Richardson, who introduced her to Roger Fry and awakened her interest in children's art. From 1929 until 1944 she divided her time between painting and teaching; she lectured for the London County Council, gave practical art classes for schoolteachers and taught part-time. The organisation of exhibitions became an important part of her strategy for increasing children's awareness of art.

== Career in art and education ==
Throughout the 1930s, Youngman showed at the Wertheim Gallery and with the London Group.

The death of her friend the artist Felicia Browne in the Spanish Civil War in 1936 altered Youngman's political outlook. She joined the left-wing Artists' International Association (AIA) and organised Browne's memorial exhibition. AIA group shows became a focus for her painting, though politics never entered her own work. It was Nan Youngman who in 1939 famously asked a workman in from the Whitechapel High Street to open the AIA's exhibition "Art for All".

In 1944 Youngman became art adviser to Cambridgeshire under Henry Morris.

Nan Youngman became chairman of the Society for Education through Art in 1945 and published her ideas in articles for Athene (the SEA journal), the New Era in Home and School and the Education Journal. Through the SEA she initiated a remarkable series of exhibitions of contemporary art for sale to education authorities called Pictures for Schools. The first took place in 1947 at the Victoria and Albert Museum and these continued annually at the Whitechapel Gallery and elsewhere until 1969.

In the 1950s Youngman travelled as lecturer in art education for the British Council to the West Indies, Malta and Ghana, but now devoted more time to painting.

While setting up a series of Pictures for Schools exhibitions in Wales, Youngman discovered the landscapes of the Rhondda Valley on which much of her subsequent work was based. In 1965 she moved to The Hawks a house near Waterbeach in the Fens whence her landscapes grew in subtlety.

Nan Youngman was appointed an Officer of the British Empire (OBE) in 1987.

The Cambridge based author Robjn Cantus published a biography of Youngman: Nan Youngman and Pictures for Schools: A legacy of Art, Education and Friendship (2025)', detailing her life, her work and her achievements with the Pictures for Schools scheme on the Inexpensive Progress imprint.

== Personal life ==
Youngman met the sculptor Betty Rea through the Artists International Association and SEA, and became her lifelong partner. When they were evacuated with Highbury Hill School to Huntingdon in 1939, the pair lived in a caravan in the grounds of Hinchingbrooke House. They then established a family home, first in Godmanchester and later at Papermills in Cambridge where they brought up an extended family including Rea's two children from a previous relationship and three they temporarily fostered.
