= Edith Bone =

Edith Bone (28 January 1889 – 14 February 1975), originally Edit Olga Hajós, was a medical professional, journalist and translator who later became a member of the Communist Party of Great Britain.

== Early life ==
Bone was born in Hungary in 1889. She married Béla Balázs in 1913. After the First World War she joined the Bolshevik Party in Petrograd. In 1918, she began editing the English version of the Communist International magazine, and later became a courier for the parent organisation. She lived in Berlin, Germany from 1923 to 1933, leaving for Britain when the Nazis took over. She married Gerald Martin, a British translator, in February 1934. She was fluent in six languages.

In July 1936, she and her friend and fellow communist, artist Felicia Browne, traveled to Spain to attend the international People's Olympiad, a protest event against the 1936 Olympics. However the event was cancelled due to the outbreak of the Spanish Civil War. Browne would become the only British woman to play a combatant role, and one of the first of the British volunteers to die in the conflict, in August 1936.

Bone remained in Spain, working as a doctor and as a journalist with Claud Cockburn, a correspondent for the Daily Worker. She was involved with the establishment of the Unified Socialist Party of Catalonia (PSUC) in Barcelona, Spain.

She returned to Britain some time before 1937 and worked as a translator for the magazine Lilliput. She resigned briefly from the Communist movement before rejoining the British Communist Party in 1942.

== Imprisonment ==
In 1949, Bone was acting as a free-lance correspondent in Budapest, affiliated with the London Daily Worker. On arriving in Hungary she was accused of spying for the British government, arrested by the State Protection Authority (AVH) and detained in solitary confinement without a fair trial or a prisoner identification number for seven years. Her friend Hebe Spaull was one of the few people who campaigned for her release from imprisonment. Spaull sent frequent inquiries to the British embassy in Budapest.

During her detention, Bone managed to avoid the mental instability or insanity that typically accompanies isolation. She developed a series of mental exercises, including reviews of geometry, the several languages she knew and vocabulary. She mentally reconstructed the plots of all of the books she had read, made a comprehensive list of all of the characters in Shakespeare and Dickens' works she could remember, and made letters out of the dense black bread she was fed; out of these she composed poetry.

She launched what she called a series of "little wars" against her captors after realising they weren't going to use physical force on her and that she had no family to threaten. This included a language strike in 1951, in which she refused to speak Hungarian but rather used all the other five languages she knew. Her protests worked as in 1952, they allowed her access to books. From these she learnt her seventh language, Greek.

She put week-long efforts into removing a very large nail from the hard oak door of her cell. To accomplish this, she slowly removed single threads from towels and wove them into a strong string with which to work the nail loose. After weeks of straining effort to get the nail to begin to wiggle and then loosen, she finally got it out. She then sharpened it on the concrete floor and used at as a drill to create a small peephole in her cell door so she could finally see out of her cell.

She used these projects to keep her mind stimulated, to fill her time with goal-oriented actions, and to keep her sanity during her long period of extreme isolation.

Bone was freed after 7 years, during the last days of the revolutionary Nagy Government in the Hungarian Revolution of 1956. A student group had seized control of the Budapest political prison where Bone was held, and processed political prisoners for release.

When she returned to Britain she gave interviews denouncing communism, due to the betrayal of being imprisoned by her fellow communists, and the communist Daily Worker newspaper which had sent her there. She died in 1975 in Richmond upon Thames, London.

== Publications ==
- Bone, Edith (December 1966). Seven Years Solitary. Cassirer. ISBN 9780851810829.

== See also ==
- Felicia Browne
