= Foreign policy of William Ewart Gladstone =

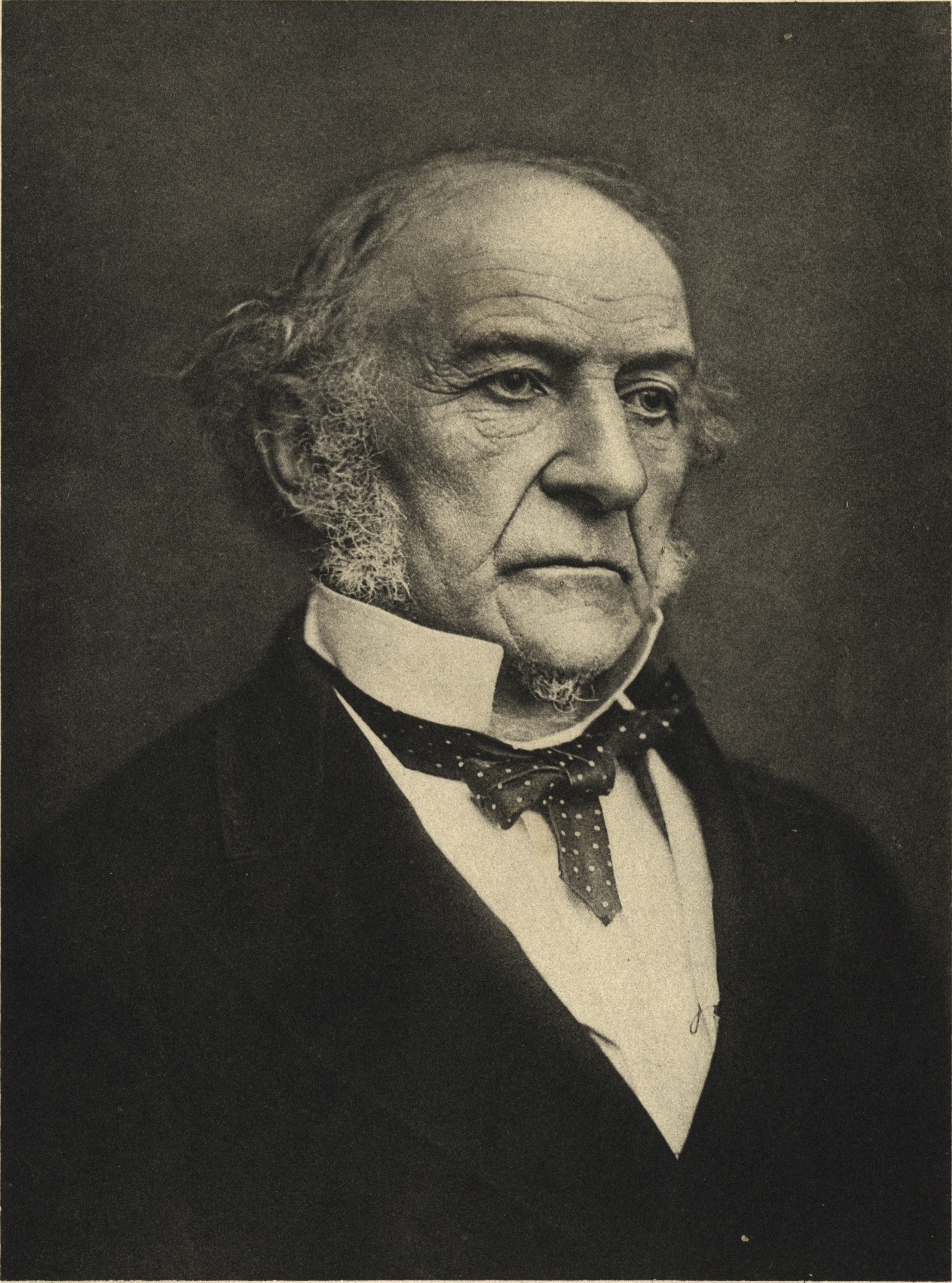
William Ewart Gladstone, 1892

The foreign policy of William Ewart Gladstone focuses primarily on British foreign policy during the four premierships of William Ewart Gladstone. It also considers his positions as Chancellor of the Exchequer, and while leader of the Liberal opposition. He gave strong support to and usually followed the advice of his foreign ministers, Lord Clarendon, who served between 1868 and 1870, Lord Granville, who served between 1870 and 1874, and 1880 and 1885, and Lord Rosebery, who served in 1886 and between 1892 and 1894. Their policies generally sought peace as the highest foreign policy goal, and did not seek expansion of the British Empire in the way that Disraeli's did. His term saw the end of the Second Anglo-Afghan War in 1880, the First Boer War of 1880–1881 and outbreak of the war (1881–1899) against the Mahdi in Sudan.

Paul Hayes says it "provides one of the most intriguing and perplexing tales of muddle and incompetence in foreign affairs, unsurpassed in modern political history until the days of Grey and, later, Neville Chamberlain."

== Opium trade ==
British traders had developed a highly profitable business of purchasing opium in British India, and selling it on the China market. When the Chinese government tried to shut it down, Whig Foreign Secretary Lord Palmerston sent in the Royal Navy. It used brute force to reopen the market in 1840. Gladstone, whose own sister at this time was addicted to opium, was outraged. He supported Conservative leader Robert Peel’s motion to denounce the trade and the government support. Gladstone, then 30 years old, argued that the Chinese government had the right to stop British traders, on account of their:

obstinacy in persisting with this infamous and atrocious traffic....Justice in my opinion, is with them; and whilst they, the Pagans, the semi-civilized barbarians have it on their side, we, the enlightened and civilized Christians, are pursuing objects at variance both with justice and with religion....A war more unjust in its origin, or calculated in its progress to cover the country with a permanent disgrace, I do not know and I've not read of....[our] flag is become a pirate flag to protect an infamous traffic.

Peel's vote of censure against the government's handling of the Opium War was defeated in the House of Commons by a vote of 262 in favour and 271 against.

Gladstone would later repeat his opinions when the Second Opium War with China broke out in 1857. He said that there was no glory in fighting China, that it was more like making war on women and children, and that the basis of British trade there was injustice. Britain should be guided by principles of mercy, peace and justice toward China. Gladstone was on the winning side of this Parliamentary vote, alongside Disraeli. However, Palmerston won the ensuing general election and continued in office as Prime Minister.

== Chancellor of the Exchequer (1852–1855, 1859–1866) ==
Britain entered the Crimean War in February 1854, and Gladstone introduced his budget on 6 March. Gladstone had to increase expenditure on the military and a vote of credit of £1,250,000 was taken to send a force of 25,000 men to the front. The deficit for the year would be £2,840,000 (estimated revenue £56,680,000; estimated expenditure £59,420,000). Gladstone refused to borrow the money needed to rectify this deficit and instead increased income tax by half, from sevenpence to tenpence-halfpenny in the pound (from 2.92% to 4.38%). By May another £6,870,000 was needed for the war and Gladstone raised the income tax from tenpence halfpenny to fourteen pence in the pound to raise £3,250,000. Spirits, malt, and sugar were taxed to raise the rest of the money needed. Gladstone's goal was to turn wealthy Britons against expensive wars. He proclaimed:

The expenses of a war are the moral check which it has pleased the Almighty to impose upon the ambition and lust of conquest that are inherent in so many nations ... The necessity of meeting from year to year the expenditure which it entails is a salutary and wholesome check, making them feel what they are about, and making them measure the cost of the benefit upon which they may calculate

As Chancellor of the Exchequer he adopted policies that impacted foreign policy. He was a leading advocate of free trade and low tariffs. At the beginning of 1859, there were 419 duties in existence. The 1860 budget reduced the number of duties to 48, with 15 duties constituting the majority of the revenue. To finance these reductions in indirect taxation, the income tax, instead of being abolished, was raised to 10d. for incomes above £150 and at 7d. for incomes above £100. Gladstone's budget of 1860 was introduced on 10 February along with the Cobden–Chevalier Treaty between Britain and France that would reduce tariffs between the two countries. This budget "marked the final adoption of the Free Trade principle, that taxation should be levied for Revenue purposes alone, and that every protective, differential, or discriminating duty ... should be dislodged".

=== Relations with Palmerston ===
Although Gladstone served under Lord Palmerston as Chancellor (briefly in 1855, then 1859–65), the two very strong personalities clashed profoundly. Especially in foreign policy, each man considered the other to be a dangerous demagogue. To Gladstone, Palmerston was a chauvinist who deliberately excited public opinion against foreign adversaries. Palmerston felt Gladstone's religiosity and sincere declarations of principle were a matter of cant or excessive religious enthusiasm. Palmerston was annoyed that Gladstone was so successful in using enthusiasm, passion, sympathy and simplicity and building public support, especially when he was out of office. They both supported Italy and worked together on that issue but they were driven apart on issues of Army, Navy, and finance. Gladstone was the little Englander who believed in international conciliation and peace, and build his base upon the middle-class businessmen who demanded low taxes and economy in government expenditures. Gladstone as Chancellor of the Exchequer (1852–1855 and 1859–1866) repeatedly tried to cut back on naval and military budgets. In dramatic contrast Palmerston was an adventurer in foreign policy who demanded that England be respected and feared in every foreign capital, a policy that demanded an expensive Royal Navy ready for action. The two men disagreed fundamentally about morality applied to foreign affairs, and defence spending, as well as religious issues and democratic reform.

Each of them used publications of diplomatic correspondence in British Blue Books as one avenue to disseminate their views in foreign policy and gain parliamentary and public support. Those were published under Gladstone's premierships, were more restrained than those under Palmerston.

== Prime minister 1868–1874 ==
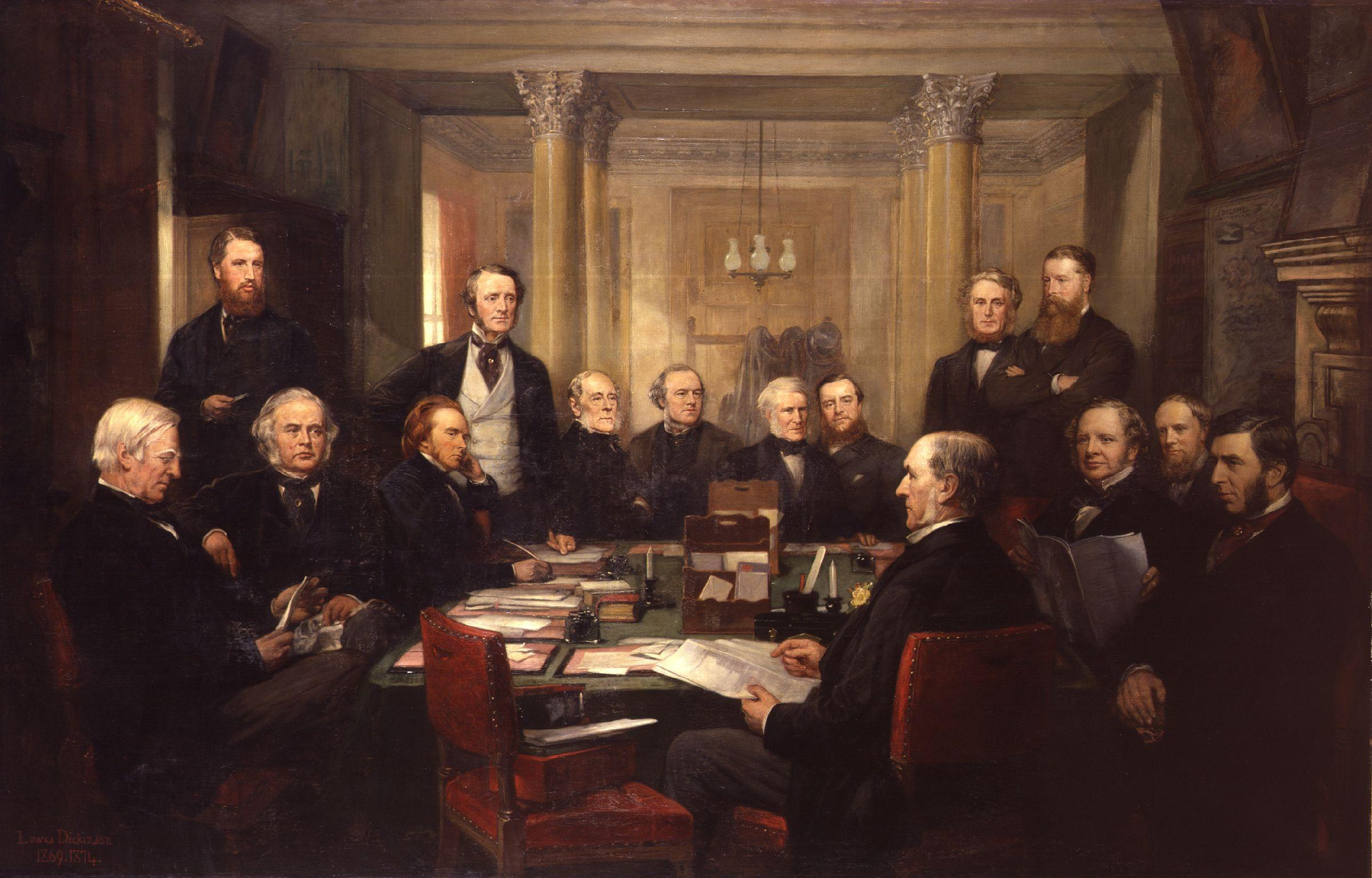
Gladstone's Cabinet of 1868, painted by Lowes Cato Dickinson. Use a cursor to see who is who.

When Gladstone began his first ministry 1 December 1868, his attention focused on domestic issues and the Irish question. With the fall of the Conservative government in 1868, Gladstone named George Villiers, Lord Clarendon, (1800–70) as his Foreign Secretary. Clarendon, a Whig, had years of relevant experience both as a diplomat in Spain in the 1830s and as Foreign Secretary (1852–58, 1865–66). He stated that his foreign policy would not change in essence, but he was cautious in European relations. John Bloomfield, Ambassador to Austria, 1860–71, kept London apprised regarding Austria, France, and Prussia and warned about the risk of war between France and Prussia. He pointed to French threats against Belgium, which Britain was obligated by treaty to defend. Britain intervened diplomatically to ease the tense situation between Prussia and Austria.

The major outstanding international issue was relations with the United States, and the emerging threat by Irish Catholic Fenian Brotherhood based in the United States to attack Canada in a failed effort to make Ireland independent. Their raids were fiascos and did not cause international trouble. Much more serious was Washington's demand for British payment of the losses the Americans suffered during the recent American Civil War at the hands of Confederate commerce raiders and blockade runners built in Britain. The issue was partly settled by international arbitration, whereby London paid $15.5 million only for British-built Confederate raiders.

In terms of the British Empire, there were small movements in Asia and Africa that for the moment demanded minimal attention from Gladstone. He opposed expansion in the South Pacific and the Malay Peninsula, although there was attention to the Fiji Islands and an increase in British influence in Malaya. The scramble for Africa to characterize the 1880s and not yet begun. Britain had small coastal holdings in both the East and West, and a successful war against the Ashanti led to the acquisition of lands in the Gold Coast. Diamonds were discovered in South Africa, dramatically increasing the economic importance of the region. A level of tension between the Boers and the British in South Africa was slowly increasing.

=== Germany ===
European affairs soon came to the fore. After complex diplomatic manoeuvres, Prussia under Chancellor Otto von Bismarck had defeated Denmark in 1864, and then Austria in 1866. War between Prussia and France was looming, and British public opinion considered France the aggressor and generally supported Prussia. Queen Victoria had very strong German ties, and was sharply hostile to France. Gladstone told the Queen that it was important that Britain not act alone in interventions in European affairs, but only in concert with other powers. He was not knowledgeable about European affairs, and showed no interest in intervening. As the tensions escalated between Berlin and Paris, Gladstone took a strong position of warning both sides, especially France, against an invasion of Belgium. Neither side had any such plans, and both promised to honour Belgian neutrality.

Gladstone was angry at German seizure of Alsace-Lorraine from France in 1871, without giving the inhabitants a voice. British public opinion, and even the Queen, agreed with him. However in the 1870s and 1880s, apart from the 1875 'war in sight' false alarm, Britain and Germany were usually in agreement over European problems. Both made it a high priority to preserve the peace; both were suspicious of the ambitions of France and Russia. Bismarck ridiculed Gladstone's liberal trust in a concert of Europe, as well as his efforts to promote democracy in Britain and end power-politics abroad. Bismarck saw his own manipulation of power politics as the best guarantee of peace, not realizing how Kaiser William II would misuse German power after 1890.

Before going to war in 1870, Bismarck had arranged for the neutrality of Russia. Russian now took advantage by disavowing the Treaty of Paris (1856) provisions that neutralized its naval forces on the Black Sea. Gladstone was angry that Russia had acted alone in rejecting any treaty provisions. He called a conference that met in London, November 1870 to March 1871. It acknowledged Russia's fait accompli but reaffirmed the strongly held views of Gladstone on the sanctity of treaties. The conference officially stated as an, "essential principle of the law of nations that no Power can liberate itself from the engagements of the treaty, nor modify the stipulations thereof, unless with the consent of the contracting Powers by means of an amicable agreement."

=== Cardwell reforms the army ===
The Cardwell Reforms were a series of reforms of the British Army undertaken by Secretary of State for War Edward Cardwell with Gladstone's support between 1868 and 1874. Usually Gladstone paid scant attention to military affairs but he was keen on efficiency and cost-cutting. In 1870, he pushed through Parliament major changes in Army organisation. Prussia's stunning triumph over France in the Franco-Prussian War proved that the Prussian system of professional soldiers with up-to-date weapons was far superior to the traditional system that Britain used. The most important of Caldwell's reforms were the Army Enlistment Act 1870, Regulation of the Forces Act 1871, and the localization scheme of 1872. They provided the foundation for the late Victorian Army: short service, a reserve, and a comprehensive regimental system based on the local depot. He made other reforms as well such as the abolition of flogging in peace time, an increase in pay, and some improvement in living conditions. In 1871 he began the first large-scale maneuvers.

The reforms were not radical; they had been brewing for years and Gladstone seized the moment to enact them. The goal was to centralise the power of the War Office, abolish the purchase of officers' commissions, and create reserve forces stationed in Britain by establishing short terms of service for enlisted men. By far the controversial element was ending the purchase system. The rich families of young officers invested large sums in the commissions and when a man was promoted he sold his previous rank, often in a private arrangement far in excess of the official price, to help pay for his new and more expensive senior rank. Legislation would reimburse the officers for their full purchase price. However the measure was defeated, whereupon the government bypassed Parliament and announced that all purchases were abolished by Order in Council, thereby destroying the value of all of those commissions. The House of Lords passed the remedial legislation and the final expenditure made by officers was reimbursed but purchase was never reinstated.

These reforms started to turn British forces into an effective imperial force capable of fighting a modern European army. The defeat of Gladstone's government in 1874 put Cardwell out of office, but his reforms stayed in place despite attempts from the Regular Army to abolish them and return to the comfortable and familiar old post-1815 situation. The main obstacle had been objections by the defunct British East India Company and its executors, who wished to maintain their own military establishment, and by the "die-hards", senior officers who opposed almost any reform on principle. The arch-conservatives were led by Queen Victoria's cousin Prince George, Duke of Cambridge, who was Commander-in-Chief of the Forces from 1856 to 1895.

Historians of the British army have generally praised the Cardwell reforms as an essential steps to full modernization. They point out that the Duke of Cambridge blocked many other reforms, such as the adoption of a general staff system as pioneered by the successful Prussian army.

However a minority of historians, chiefly political specialists, have criticized the limited nature of the reforms. Theodore Hoppen says these reforms were:

at best partial, at worst ineffective....No planning department was established and no chief of staff appointed to set out the purpose and strategy of the army as a whole because politicians, Civil Servants, and soldiers all proved reluctant to take seriously the idea that Britain could ever again be involved in a large scale European war.

=== Principles of Foreign Policy ===
In 1879, when he was out of office, Gladstone expounded on "the right principles of foreign policy." These included the preservation of peace, the love of liberty, and respect for the equal rights of all nations. Gladstone had most famously expressed his policies and terms of the oppression of the Neapolitans in 1851 (when he protested against the imprisonment of the liberal Carlo Poerio), and did so again for the Bulgarians in 1876, and the Armenians oppressed by the Turks in the 1890s. In 1879 in the Midlothian Campaign he attacked Disraeli's leadership, emphasizing the simple moral principle with his typical religious approach:

Remember the rights of the savage as we call him. Remember that...the sanctity of human life in the hill villages of Afghanistan among the winter snows, is as inviolable in the eye of Almighty God as can be your own. Remember that...mutual love is not limited by the shores of this island, is not limited by the boundaries of Christian civilization, that it passes over the whole surface of the earth and embraces the meanest along with the greatest in his unmeasured scope.

== Prime minister 1880–1885 and 1886 ==
=== Granville as Foreign Secretary ===
Lord Granville served twice as Foreign Secretary (1870–1874 and 1880–1885). His Gladstonian foreign policy based on patience, peace, and no alliances kept Britain free from European wars. It brought better relations with the United States, and it was innovative in supporting Gladstone's wish to settlement British-American fisheries and Civil War disputes over the Confederate cruisers built in Britain, like the Alabama, through international arbitration in 1872. For example, the long-standing San Juan Island Water Boundary Dispute in Puget Sound, which had been left ambiguous in the Oregon Treaty of 1846 to salve relations and get a treaty sorting out the primary differences, was arbitrated by the German Emperor also in 1872. In putting British-American relations up to the world as a model for how to resolve disputes peacefully, Granville helped create a breakthrough in international relations.

The Franco-Prussian War of 1870 broke out within a few days after Granville in the House of Lords quoted the opinion of the permanent under-secretary (Edmund Hammond) that "he had never known so great a lull in foreign affairs." Russia took advantage of the situation to denounce the Black Sea clauses of the Treaty of Paris, and Lord Granville's protest was ineffectual. In 1871 an intermediate zone between Asiatic Russia and Afghanistan was agreed on between him and Shuvalov; but in 1873 Russia took possession of the Khanate of Khiva, within the neutral zone, and Lord Granville had to accept the aggression (See also: The Great Game).

When the Conservatives came into power in 1874, Granville stepped down as Foreign Minister. His role for the next six years was to criticise Disraeli's "spirited" foreign policy, and to defend his own more pliant methods. He returned to the Foreign Office in 1880, only to find an anti-British spirit developing in German policy which the temporising methods of the Liberal leaders were generally powerless to deal with.

=== Spanish issues ===
During 1865–76 Britain sought to calm the Iberian Peninsula. The issues were many: Spain tried to unite with Portugal; there was internal strife in Spain over the throne; and France and Germany argued over the Spanish succession in 1870. Furthermore there was a "War-in-Sight" crisis of 1875, problems in Morocco, religious intolerance, and the usual issues of trade, which British merchants dominated. London opposed the union of Spain and Portugal because it wanted to keep Portugal as a loyal ally with its strategic location in the Atlantic. Britain held Gibraltar but it was not yet a fully satisfactory base. The unsuccessful attempts after September 1868 to find a successor to Queen Isabella who would satisfy the French, Germans, Portuguese, Austrians, Italians, and Spanish kept British diplomats busy with peacemaking moves in many capitals. With British help, Spain slowly ceded control of Morocco to France. Spanish anti-Protestant intolerance troubled British merchants and bankers, so Spain softened religious intolerance. For the most part British diplomats were able to defuse tensions and defend British interests in the Peninsula.

=== Ottoman Empire ===
After 1800 the Ottoman Empire steadily weakened militarily, and lost most of its holdings in Europe (starting with Greece) and in North Africa, starting with Egypt. Its great enemy was Russia, while its chief supporter was Britain.

As the 19th century progressed the Ottoman Empire grew weaker and Britain increasingly became its chief ally and protector, even fighting the Crimean War in the 1850s to protect it against Russian encroachment, albeit at heavy cost in British lives. Three British leaders played major roles in policy towards Turkey. Lord Palmerston, who in the 1830–1865 era considered the Ottoman Empire an essential component in the balance of power, was the most favourable toward Constantinople. William Gladstone in the 1870s sought to build a Concert of Europe that would support the survival of the Ottoman Empire. In the 1880s and 1890s Lord Salisbury contemplated an orderly dismemberment of Turkey, in such a way as to reduce rivalry between the greater powers. The Berlin Conference on Africa of 1884 was, except for the abortive Hague Conference of 1899, the last great international political summit before 1914. Gladstone stood alone in advocating concerted instead of individual action regarding the internal administration of Egypt, the reform of the Ottoman empire, and the opening-up of Africa. Bismarck and Lord Salisbury rejected Gladstone’s position and were more representative of the consensus. Gladstone abandoned Salisbury’s Ottoman policy; withdrew the military consuls; and disregarded several British guarantees to the Porte. He did not return Cyprus.

=== “Splendid isolation” and Afghanistan ===
“Splendid isolation” was the slogan used to characterize the British policy of operating without alliances. The worst moment came in spring 1885, when the Russians defeated the Afghans along their frontier. In what the British called "The Great Game" London feared Russia would invade Afghanistan and threaten India from the north. Gladstone secured a vote of credit from Parliament, in preparation for a war with Russia. His strategy was to send the Royal Navy through the Straits into the Black Sea and threaten Russia. However the Ottoman officials, strongly supported by all the European powers, refused to allow passage. It was the most formidable display of Continental hostility to Britain between Napoleon's day and Hitler's. Russia, however, had no interest in conquering Afghanistan and that tension was peacefully settled with Afghanistan remaining a buffer state.

=== Takeover of Egypt, 1882 ===
Gladstone took control of Egypt in 1882; intended as temporary, it lasted until the 1950s. The decisive event emerged from the Anglo-Egyptian War, which resulted in the British occupation of Egypt for seven decades, even though the Ottoman Empire retained nominal ownership until 1914. France was seriously unhappy, having lost control of the canal that it built and financed and had dreamed of for decades. Germany, Austria, Russia, and Italy – and of course the Ottoman Empire itself—were all angered by London's unilateral intervention. Britain insisted over and over that the Porte was still sovereign and the occupation of Egypt was temporary. A complete takeover of Egypt, turning it into a British colony like India was much too dangerous for it would be the signal for the powers to rush in for the spoils of the tottering Ottoman Empire, with a major war a likely result. Historian A.J.P. Taylor says that this "was a great event; indeed, the only real event in international relations between the Battle of Sedan and the defeat of Russia in the Russo-Japanese War." Taylor emphasizes the long-term impact:

The British occupation of Egypt altered the balance of power. It not only gave the British security for their route to India; it made them masters of the Eastern Mediterranean and the Middle East; it made it unnecessary for them to stand in the front line against Russia at the Straits....And thus prepared the way for the Franco-Russian Alliance ten years later.

Gladstone and his Liberal Party had a reputation for strong opposition to imperialism, so historians have long debated the explanation for this sudden reversal of policy. The most influential was study by John Robinson and Ronald Gallagher, Africa and the Victorians (1961), which focused on The Imperialism of Free Trade and was promoted by the Cambridge School of historiography. They argue there was no long-term Liberal plan in support of imperialism, but the urgent necessity to act to protect the Suez Canal was decisive in the face of what appeared to be a radical collapse of law and order, and a nationalist revolt focused on expelling the Europeans, regardless of the damage it would do to international trade and the British Empire. Gladstone's decision came against strained relations with France, and maneuvering by "men on the spot" in Egypt. Critics such as Cain and Hopkins have stressed the need to protect large sums invested by British financiers and Egyptian bonds, while downplaying the risk to the viability of the Suez Canal. Unlike the Marxists, they stress "gentlemanly" financial and commercial interests, not the industrial, capitalism that Marxists believe was always central. More recently, specialists on Egypt have been interested primarily in the internal dynamics among Egyptians that produce the failed Urabi Revolt.

== Prime Minister 1892–1894 ==
In December 1893 an Opposition motion called for an expansion of the Royal Navy. Gladstone opposed increasing public expenditure on the naval estimates, in the tradition of free trade liberalism of his earlier political career as Chancellor. Gladstone's tax reductions had been facilitated by the naval economies; his final act of resignation (1894) was precipitated by his inability to prolong the period of naval economy when he discovered that almost all his colleagues supported expansion of the Royal Navy. Gladstone resigned the premiership, ostensibly on health grounds, on 2 March 1894 and was succeeded by Lord Rosebery.

== See also ==
- History of the foreign relations of the United Kingdom
- Historiography of the British Empire
- International relations of the Great Powers (1814–1919)
- Egypt–United Kingdom relations
  - History of Egypt under the British
- France–United Kingdom relations
- Germany–United Kingdom relations
- Timeline of British diplomatic history
