= Hebe Spaull =

British Journalist

- in the 1960s
- Born: 1890s Edmonton
- Died: 1974; London
- Occupation: writer
- Employer: freelance
- Known for: supporter of the League of Nations

Hebe Spaull (1893 - 1974) was a British journalist, educator, and activist known for her work promoting international understanding, particularly among young people, during the interwar period. She was a proponent of the League of Nations and dedicated her career to fostering a culture of peace through writing, lecturing, and involvement in various organizations.

== Career and activism ==
Spaull was born in 1893 in London.

In 1929 she partnered with Simon Sherman to write "The United World". Sherman worked for the League of Nations and it has been described as the first attempt to describe teaching in schools in different countries. The foreword was written by George Peabody Gooch. Two years later she wrote a history of the League of Nations.

Spaull devoted her career to promoting international cooperation and peace, particularly among young people, following the First World War. She worked as a journalist. For the seventeen years before the outbreak of the second world war she was a press officer for the League of Nations Union (LNU). The LNU played an important role in inter-war politics. According to one source it had been successful in converting the mainstream of British society, including labour, the churches and the principal newspapers, to the cause of the League of Nations.

In 1949 her friend Edith Bone was arrested as a spy in Hungary. Bone was a communist and she was held for seven years without a trial. Spaull was one of the few people who campaigned for her release of imprisonment. Spaull sent frequent enquiries to the British embassy in Budapest.

In 1958 she wrote an article for UNESCO titled "A Smoother way for Britain's coloured immigrants". It was about the issues arising from the number of non-white immigrants arriving in London.

She wrote about the international support for the co-operative movement in the 1960s. Spaull died in 1974 in London.

== Selected works ==
She covered the works of organisations like the International Labour Organization.

=== Books ===
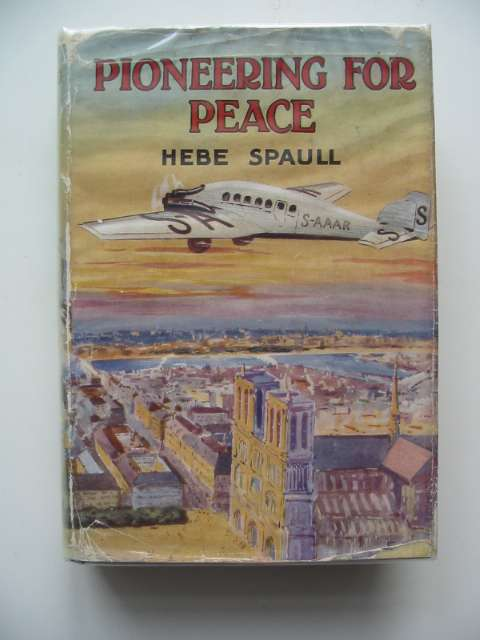
Pioneering for Peace, 1931

- Women's Work for Peace. London: The Highway Press. 1920.
- The Fight for Peace: Stories of the Work of the League of Nations. G. Bell & sons. 1923.
- Women Peace Makers. London: Harrap. 1924.
- Peeps at the League of Nations, 1928
- Champions of Peace. London: Georgie Allen & Unwell. 1926.
- The World Since the War. London: G. Bell and Sons. 1926.
- How the World is Governed: A Study in World Civics. London: Hogarth Press. 1933.
- Sherman, Stanley Simon; Spaull, Hebe (1929). The United World. J.M. Dent & Sons.
- Pioneering for Peace, 1931
- Youth of Russia To-day. London: Ivor Nicholson and Watson, Ltd. 1933.
- World Problems of To-Day: Explained for Boys and Girls. London: S.C.M. Press. 1935.
- Life in Other Lands: The United States of America. London: S.C.M. Press. 1937.
- Life in Other Lands: France. London: S.C.M. Press. 1937.
- Adams, Katharine; Spaull, Hebe (1942). Peace is Possible. London: G. Bell and Sons.
- ABC of Civics: A Dictionary of Terms Used in Connection with Parliament, Local Authorities, Courts of Law, Diplomacy and the United Nations. C. and J. Temple. 1949.
- The World's Changed Face since 1945. London: Barrie and Rockliff. 1964.
- This is Morocco, 1953
- The Cooperative Movement in the World Today (London 1965 ) .
- New Place Names of the World. London: Ward Lock. 1970.

Peeps at Many Lands, The Baltic States. A&C Black, LTD.London 1931

== Bibliography ==
- Bussey, Gertrude, and Margaret Tims. Pioneers for Peace: Women's International League for Peace and Freedom, 1915-1965. London: George Allen & Unwin, 1965.
- Kent, Neil. 'The Little Commonwealths: British Voluntary Youth Organisations and the Post-War Reconstruction of Citizenship, 1918–1939.' Journal of Contemporary History 40, no. 2 (2005): 283–300.
- Sharp, Ingrid. 'Gender and warfare: past, present and future.' Gender, Place & Culture 22, no. 1 (2015): 146-156.
- Sluga, Glenda. Internationalism in the Age of Nationalism. Philadelphia: University of Pennsylvania Press, 2015.
