= Felicia Browne =

British artist

- Born: 18 February 1904; Weston Green, Surrey, England
- Died: 25 August 1936 (aged 32); Aragón, Spain
- Education: St John's Wood Art School; Slade School of Art
- Known for: Painting, political activism, being the first British person to die in the Spanish Civil War
- Awards: Tolpuddle medal

Felicia Mary Browne (18 February 1904 – 25 August 1936) was an English artist and communist. She was the only British woman combatant and first British volunteer to die in the Spanish Civil War. Her body was not recovered.

== Early life and education ==
Felicia Mary Browne was born at Weston Green, Thames Ditton, Surrey, on 18 February 1904. She was the third daughter and the fourth of five children born to Edith (née Johnston) (1875–1931), an actress and Harold Browne (1875–1924), a company director in an advertising agency. Browne studied at the St John's Wood Art School and the Slade School of Art between 1920–21 and 1927–28. Arriving at the Slade at the unusually young age of 16, she was a contemporary of William Coldstream, Clive Branson, Claude Rogers and Nan Youngman.

== Career ==
She travelled to Berlin in 1928 to study metalwork and became an apprentice to a stonemason. She was living in Berlin during the rise of National Socialism and participated in anti-fascist activities. One account describes her taking part in anti-Nazi street-fighting. In the early 1930s she returned to Britain, leaving her sculptures and tools behind. Browne visited the USSR in 1931 and in 1933 she joined the Communist Party of Great Britain, attracting the interest of M15 and Special Branch who continued to monitor her until she left for Spain in 1936.

She also became an active member of the Artists' International Association, and in 1934 she won a prize for her design of the Trades Union Congress Tolpuddle medal. She contributed art to Left Review.

== Involvement in the Spanish Civil War ==
In July 1936 Browne embarked on a driving holiday to France and Spain, accompanied by her friend Dr Edith Bone, a left-wing photographer. Their objective was to reach Barcelona in time for the People's Olympiad (the Soviet response to the Olympic Games in Hitler's Berlin). However, they arrived shortly before the military rebellion against the Spanish republic that heralded the start of the Spanish Civil War (1936–1939), and were immediately caught up in the violence that engulfed Barcelona on 19 July 1936. On 3 August 1936, after several attempts, she successfully enlisted in the PSUC (Catalan Communist) Karl Marx militia to fight in Aragon on the Zaragoza front. According to the Daily Express correspondent Sydney Smith, she demanded to be enlisted to fight, declaring that "I am a member of the London Communists and I can fight as well as any man." Shortly after joining she wrote to her friend Elizabeth Watson describing her desperation to get involved; "Apparently no chance of aviation school on account of my eyesight, God damn it."

== Death and commemoration ==
On 25 August 1936 Browne was killed in action on the Aragón front near Tardienta, while part of a band of raiders that attempted to dynamite a Nationalist munitions train. The party was itself ambushed and Browne was shot dead while assisting an injured Italian republican. Browne's body had to be left there but her fellow soldiers retrieved a sketchbook from her possessions filled with drawings of her fellow soldiers. These made their way to Tom Wintringham, a journalist for the Daily Worker, who suggested to Harry Pollitt that they be sold by the Artists' International Association (AIA) to raise money for Spanish relief. The AIA presented Browne as being the epitome of an artist choosing to take direct political action.

Her friend and colleague Nan Youngman, who was much affected by her death, organised her memorial exhibition in October 1936.

== See also ==
- Shapurji Saklatvala
- British Battalion
- Charlie Hutchison
- Bill Alexander
- Ralph Winston Fox
- Thora Silverthorne
