= Peace Ballot =

Vote regarding the League of Nations in Britain

The Peace Ballot of 1934–35 was a nationwide questionnaire in Britain of five questions attempting to discover the British public's attitude to the League of Nations and collective security. Its official title was "A National Declaration on the League of Nations and Armaments." Advocates of the League of Nations felt that a growing isolationism in Britain had to be countered by a massive demonstration that the public demanded adherence to the principles of the League. Recent failures to achieve disarmament had undermined the credibility of the League, and there were fears the National government might step back from its official stance of supporting the League.

The Ballot was run by the "National Declaration committee" set up by the League of Nations Union and spearheaded by the LNU's president, Lord Cecil of Chelwood. It was not sponsored by the government and was only an unofficial expression of opinion of about half the electorate. The main opposition came from Lord Beaverbrook, whose Daily Express newspaper repeatedly ridiculed the ballot; however most major newspapers were supportive.

According to Dame Adelaide Livingstone who wrote the official history of the ballot, the first objective of the Peace Ballot from the outset, even before the questions had been posed, was to prove that the British public supported a policy of the League of Nations as the central determining factor of British foreign policy. Starting in 1933 plans for polls were discussed and local polls were taken in 1934 to test the questions and the canvassing process, for nothing remotely on the same scale had ever been attempted in Britain.

Half-a-million supporters went door-to-door starting in late 1934, asking all those registered to vote in parliamentary elections. From February 1935 onwards through to May there was a rapid rise in the numbers of people voting in the Ballot. The poll was completed in June 1935 and the final results were announced on 27 June 1935, at a huge rally at the Royal Albert Hall in London. The Archbishop of Canterbury took the Chair and Lord Cecil announced the results. The total number who voted was 11.6 million, 38% of the adult population and over half the 21 million who voted in the general election five months later.

== Endorsement ==
The Peace Ballot's official endorsers covered a wide range. They included the Labour Party, the Liberal Party, the Archbishop of Canterbury, the Archbishop of York (and more than fifty bishops), the Moderator of the General Assembly of the Church of Scotland, the Roman Catholic Archbishop of Liverpool, the President of the National Council of Evangelical Free Churches, the General Secretary of the Baptist Union, the Moderator of the English Presbyterian Church, the Chief Rabbi, and numerous celebrated intellectuals and professionals. The Conservative Party decided not to participate, but it did not urge its members to abstain, and at the local level Conservatives helped in the canvass of voters.

Yellow leaflets explaining the ballot told voters:

In this Ballot you are asked to vote only for peace or war - whether you approve of the League of Nations or not, whether you are in favour of international disarmament or not. And by voting for the League of Nations you are helping not only your country, but the other countries of the World to maintain Peace and abolish war with all its horrors."

== Results ==
The first question of the Ballot was: Should Great Britain remain a Member of the League of Nations?.

- YES: 11,090,387
- NO: 355,883.

The second question was: Are you in favour of all-round reduction of armaments by international agreement?.

- YES: 10,470,489.
- NO: 862,775.

The third question was: Are you in favour of an all-round abolition of national military and naval aircraft by international agreement?.

- YES: 9,533,558.
- NO: 1,689,786.

The fourth question was: Should the manufacture and sale of armaments for private profit be prohibited by international agreement?.

- YES: 10,417,329.
- NO: 775,415.

The fifth and last question was: Do you consider that, if a nation insists on attacking another, the other nations should combine to compel it to stop—

(a) by economic and non-military measures:

- YES: 10,027,608.
- NO: 635,074.

(b) if necessary, military measures:

- YES: 6,784,368.
- NO: 2,351,981.

== Interpretation ==
Britons, said Lord Cecil, had shown "overwhelming approval" of the collective system. Winston Churchill in 1948 said it meant Britons were "willing, and indeed resolved, to go to war in a righteous cause," provided that all action was taken under the auspices of the League. Philip Noel-Baker later wrote it showed Britain "was prepared to stop Mussolini by armed force if that should be required."

The Conservative government did pay attention, and decided to use the League more in its foreign policy, especially in the crisis over Italy's invasion of Ethiopia.

Baldwin (1955) argues that his father Stanley Baldwin planned a rearmament programme as early as 1934, but had to do so quietly to avoid antagonizing the pacifistic public revealed by the Peace Ballot and endorsed by both the Labour and the Liberal oppositions. His thorough presentation of the case for rearmament in 1935, the son argues, defeated pacificism and secured a victory that allowed rearmament to move ahead.

Taylor argues that with international disarmament a dead letter, only question five-B mattered. The Peace Ballot had become a ringing endorsement of collective security by all means short of war, along with a hesitant support for war.
