= Adelaide Livingstone =

American-British human rights activist

Dame Adelaide Lord Livingstone, DBE (née Stickney; 19 January 1881 – 14 September 1970) was an American-British human rights activist responsible for organising the Peace Ballot in 1934–35 to gauge the British public's sentiment in the winds of upcoming war with a rearming and aggressive Germany led by Adolf Hitler.

== Early life and education ==
Adelaide Lord Stickney was born in Fall River, Massachusetts, the daughter of Charles Devall Stickney of Fall River and Florence Sutherland Orr of Taunton, Massachusetts. She was educated privately in the United States, Italy, France and Germany.

== International work ==
At the outbreak of the First World War, Livingstone arrived in England, where she took a leading role in the repatriation of women and children in Germany and other Axis nations. Her work was given recognition and in May 1915, the same month she married Captain William Henry Darley Livingstone of the Northumberland Fusiliers, the British government appointed her to a committee on the treatment of British prisoners of war. As part of her work on the committee, known as the Government Committee on the Treatment by the Enemy of British Prisoners of War, she made several trips to Switzerland to establish a system of examining prisoners transferred from Germany. She was also sent to the Netherlands as a member of a British delegation that met with German representatives about the treatment of prisoners of war.

In the 1918 New Year Honours, she was appointed a Dame Commander of the Order of the British Empire. Livingstone, described as "a nominal Conservative", was appointed secretary of the National Referendum Committee on 11 April 1935. She later became Vice President of the United Nations Association. Livingstone authored The Peace Ballot: The Official History in 1935; although publisher Victor Gollancz was criticised for reportedly rushing to publish before the final votes had been tabulated. Correspondence regarding the above; including Trades Union Congress; subsequent National Peace Ballot, documents, reports, and memoranda are located in the Trades Union Congress archives.

== International Peace Campaign ==
The International Peace Campaign emerged in early 1936, following the Peace Ballot organised in Britain by Dame Adelaide. Its Joint Presidents were Viscount Cecil (who inspired the campaign) and Pierre Cot, Air Minister in the French Popular Front government.

The IPC aimed to co-ordinate the work of existing pacifist organisations and other groups opposed to war, and campaigned in support of the League of Nations on a policy of respect for treaty obligations, arms reduction and the peaceful resolution of conflict. After the outbreak of war, the campaign had difficulty sustaining its activities and was wound up in early 1941.

== Source ==
- Livingstone, (Dame) Adelaide, The Peace Ballot: The Official History. London: Gollancz, 1935.
