= Frank Moss Bennett =

British painter (1874–1952)

- Bennett self portrait
- Born: 15 November 1874; Liverpool, Lancashire, England
- Died: 23 February 1952 (aged 77); Newton Abbot, Devon, England
- Occupation: Painter
- Spouse: Margaret Alma Pellew

Frank Moss Bennett (1874–1952) was a British painter of portraits, historical scenes and architecture. He was known for his posthumous portraits, particularly of soldiers killed during the First World War, which were commissioned by grieving relatives as a remembrance of their sons and husbands.

== Early life ==
Frank Moss Bennett was born on 15 November 1874 in Liverpool, England. He was educated at the Clifton College, a private boarding school in Bristol where he met Edward Francis Wells who would become a lifelong friend and fellow artist. Bennett and Wells followed the same educational path, first studying at the Slade School of Fine Art, then St John's Wood Art School, and finally at the Royal Academy Schools in London where Bennett won the Gold Medal and a Travel Scholarship. The latter enabled Bennett to spend a year travelling in Italy with Wells (who was probably independently financed).

== Career ==
He painted portraits as well as historic and religious paintings. His work was exhibited at the Royal Academy of Arts from 1898 to 1928 as well as the Liverpool Art Gallery from 1899 to 1932. More recently, his work has been auctioned by Christie's and Bonhams. His portrait of Theodore Martin is at the National Portrait Gallery in London.

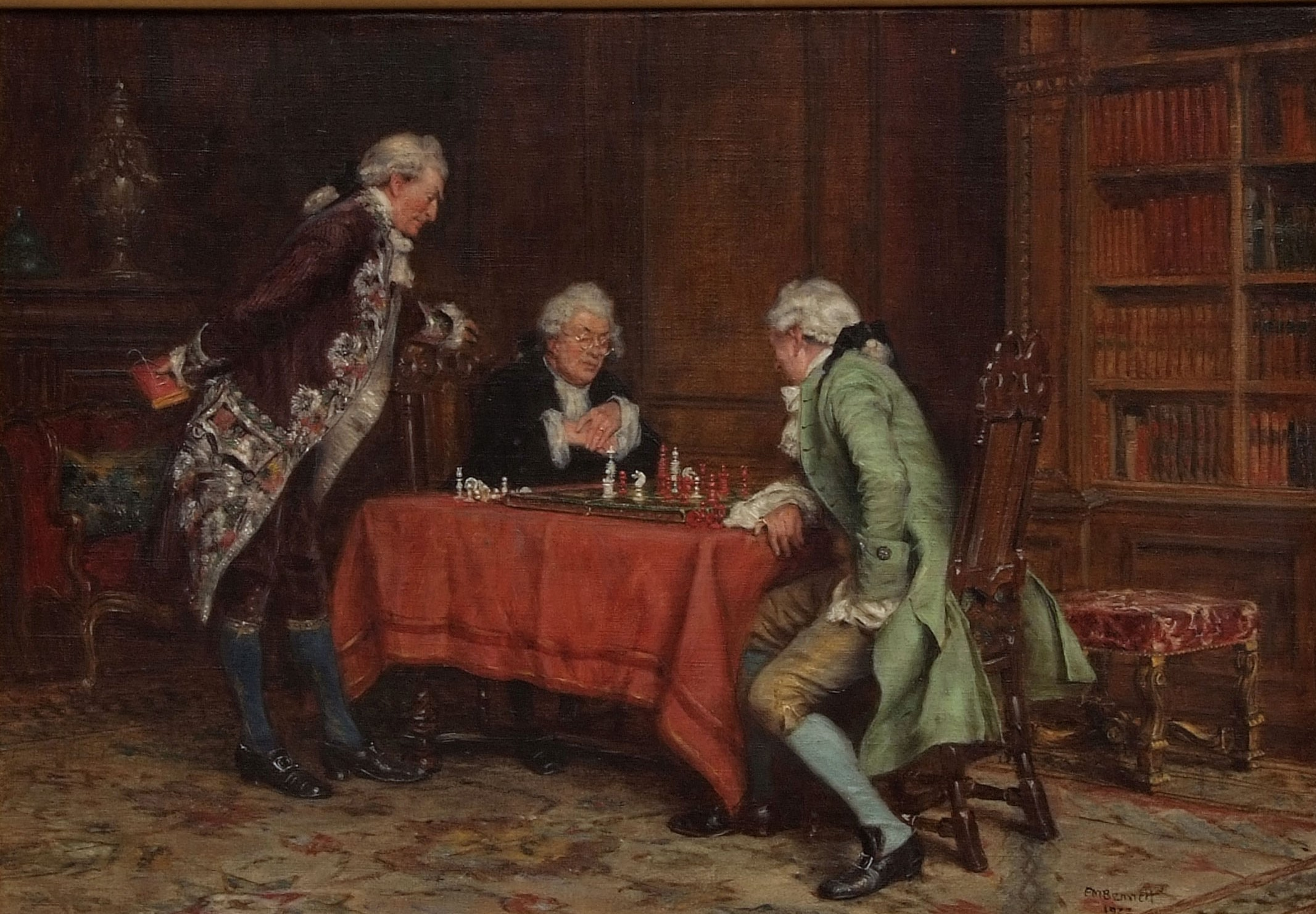
'Nearing the end'. Oil on canvas. Signed and dated 'FM Bennett 1922' (lower right)

His historical genre paintings are particularly popular. They were complemented by his accurate knowledge of period costume and furnishings. Bennett had a large collection of Eighteenth and early Nineteenth Century costumes. An impressive example from the collection is seen worn by the man on the left-hand side in the painting Nearing the end. The garment is also illustrated in the biographical book 'Frank Moss Bennett, 1874-1952, (The Forgotten Artist)' and it is currently in the costume collection of The Colonial Williamsburg Foundation, Virginia, USA. Where it is described as

Man's blue livery suit made of deep blue broadcloth with red wool cuffs and lining. It has a high standing collar, curved sleeves and a cut away front displaying silk frogging and tassel trim, the jacket is heavily trimmed with livery lace, it has shaped pocket flaps and the whole of the coat is lined with red linen, the coat closes with double hook and eye fastening. This kind of livery would have been worn by the manservant in very wealthy households. There is some evidence of alterations. English 1775-1790. CAT.NO. 1954-1030-1

This garment was also illustrated in the 'Costume' series of cigarette cards on a card titled 'A Man of Fashion 1775'. Bennett designed (providing original oil paintings) all 50 cards in the series which appeared in cigarette packets in October, November and December of 1929. The cards were produced by Mardon, Son and Hall of Bristol (of Great Britain and Ireland), the firm that dealt with the advertising for Imperial Tobacco (now Imperial Brands). This is just one example (of the many) where Bennett's paintings were reproduced as prints for commercial use.

== Personal life ==
He married Margaret Alma Pellew in 1907. They had a son, Edward Fleetwood Pellew, and a daughter, Barbara Francis. They resided in London. By 1938, they moved to Whetcombe Barton farm in Newton Abbot, Devon.

== Death ==
Bennett died on 23 February 1952 at Whetcombe Barton, Newton Abbot, England.

== Gallery ==
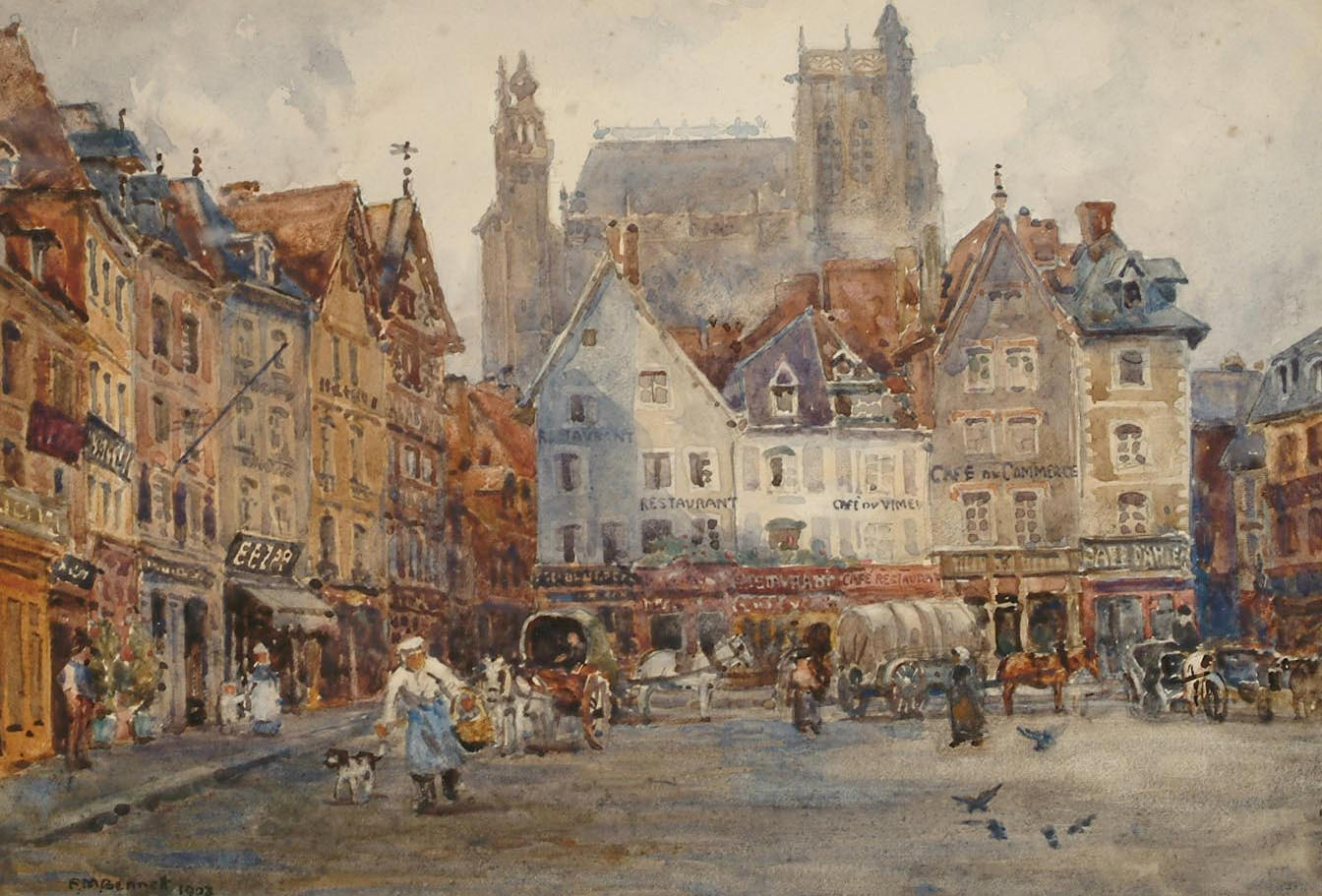
'Market square at Chartres'. Watercolour. Signed and dated 1903

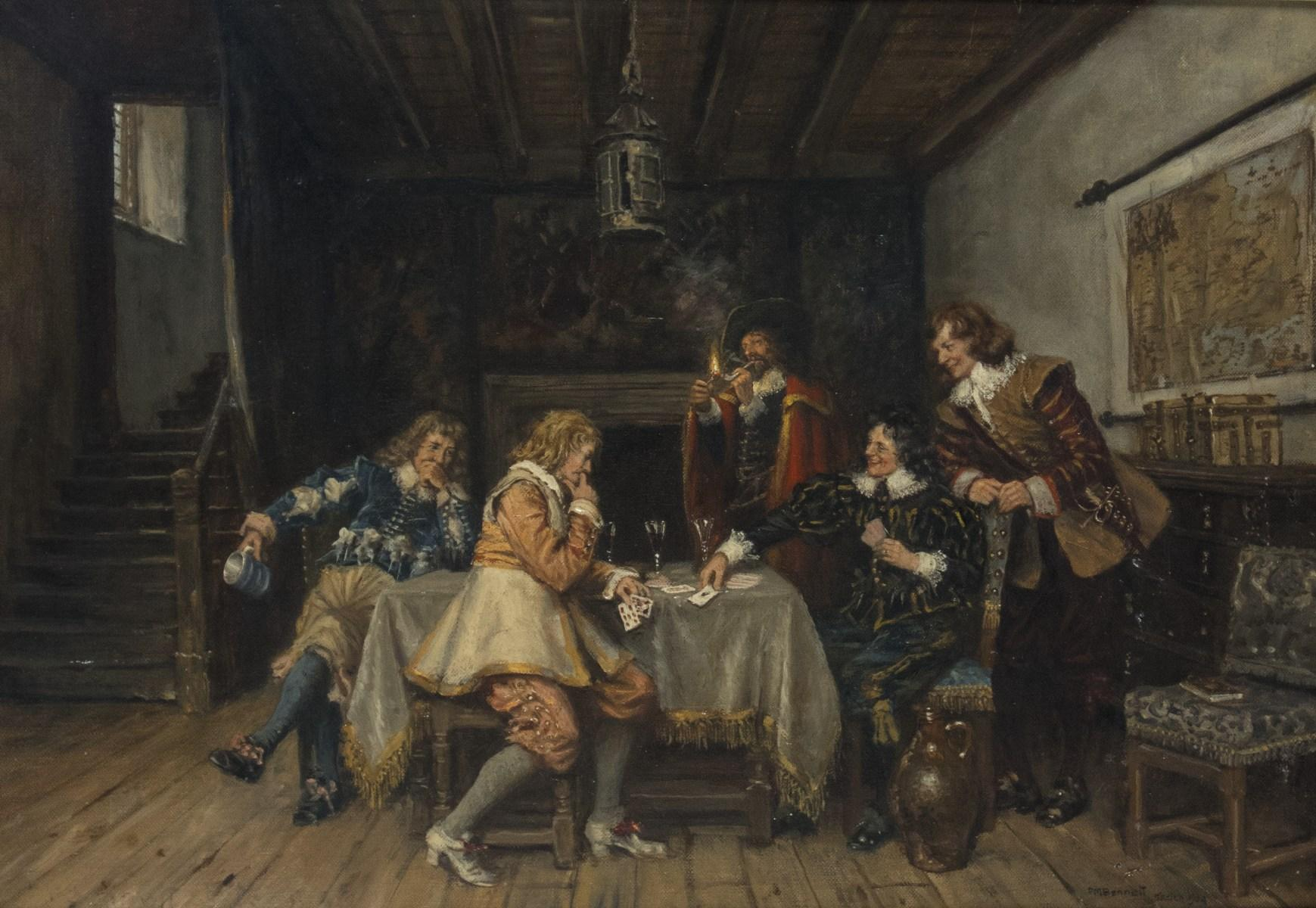
'The card game'. Oil on canvas. Signed and dated 'FM Bennett sketch 1904'

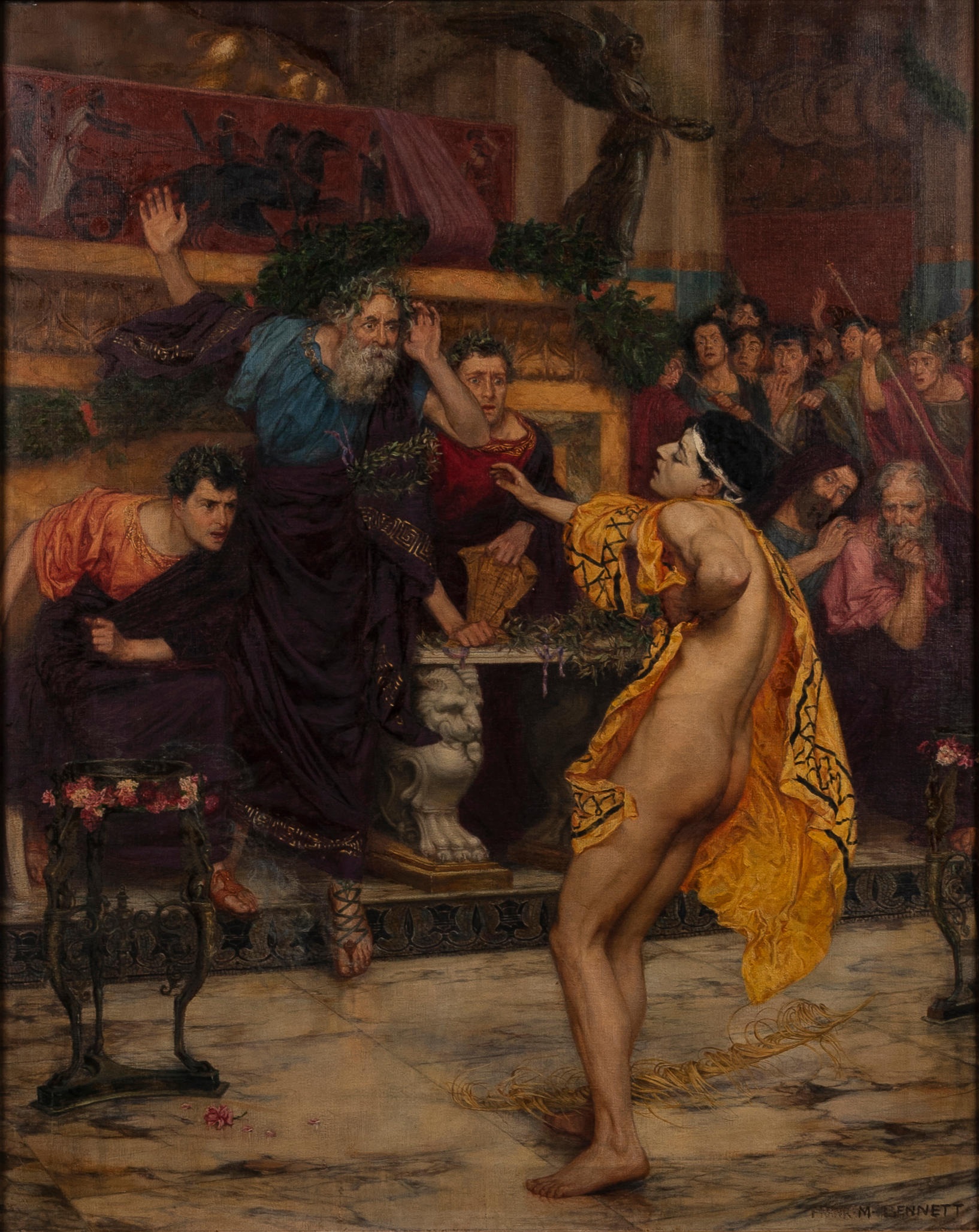
'The Athenian Messenger Pheidippides Delivers News of the Victory at Marathon', c. 1913. Oil on canvas. Signed 'FRANK.M.BENNETT' (lower right)

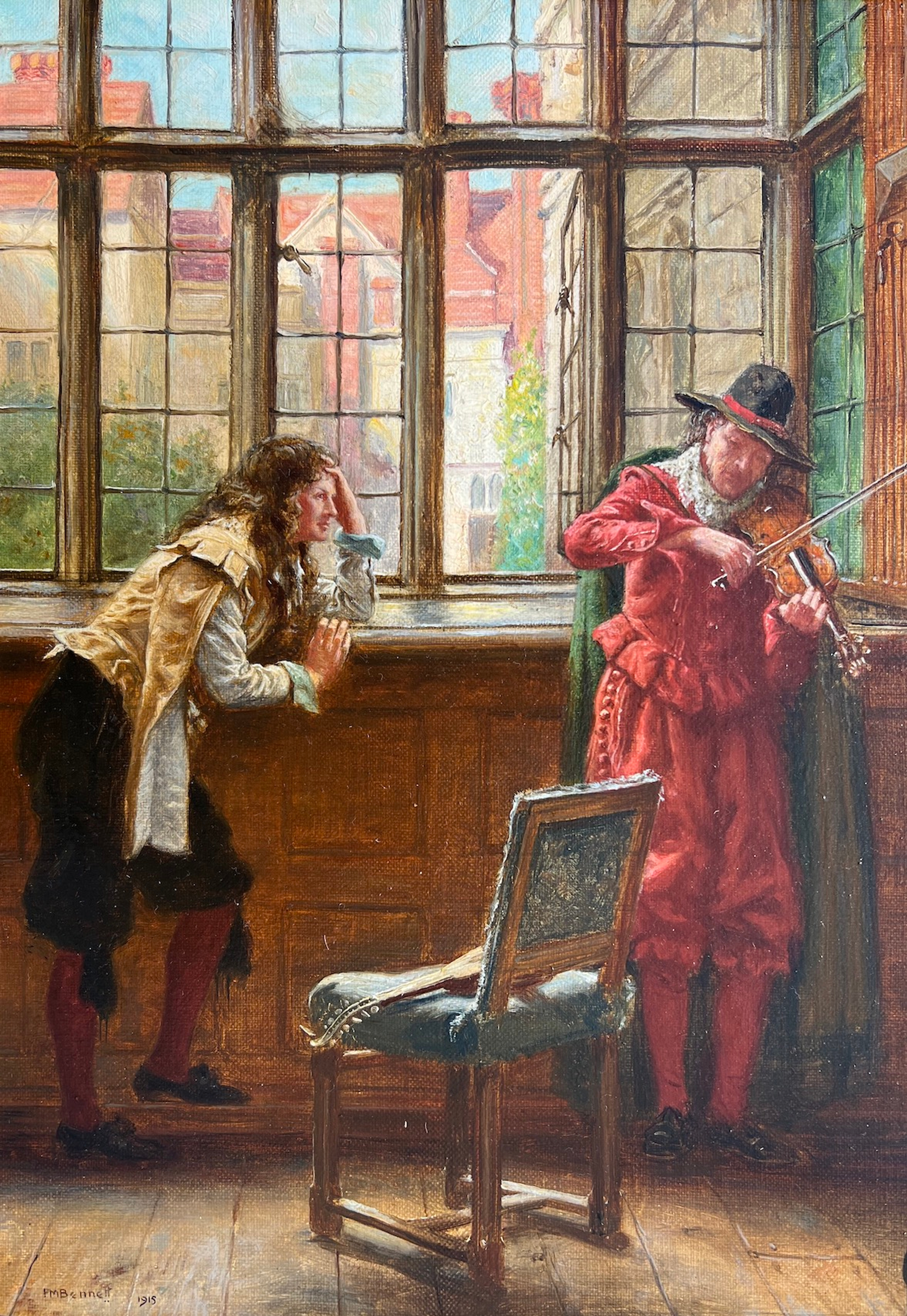
'The Violinist'. Oil on canvas. Signed and dated 'FM Bennett 1915' (lower left)

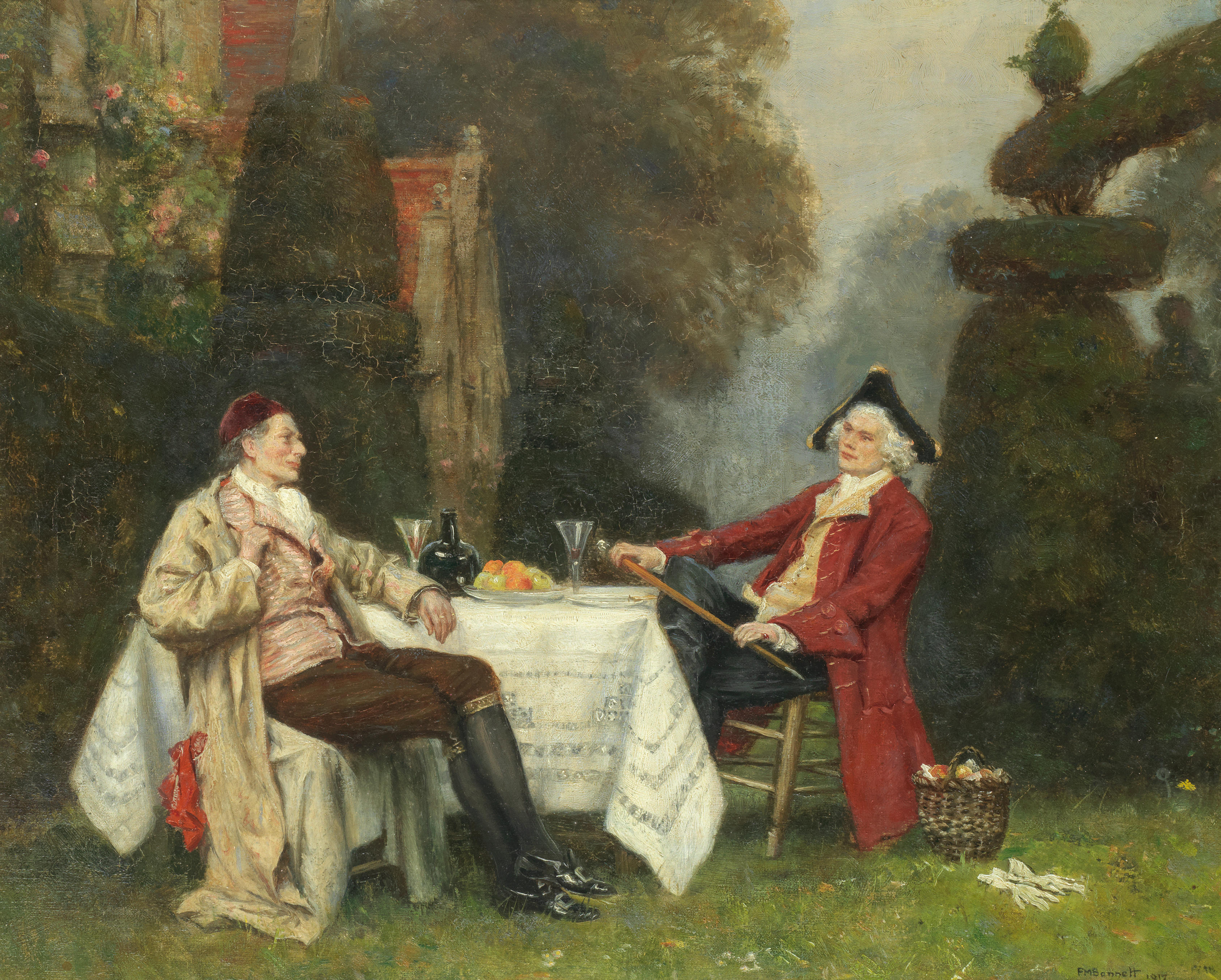
'A drink in the garden'. Oil on panel. Signed and dated 'FM Bennett 1917' (lower right)

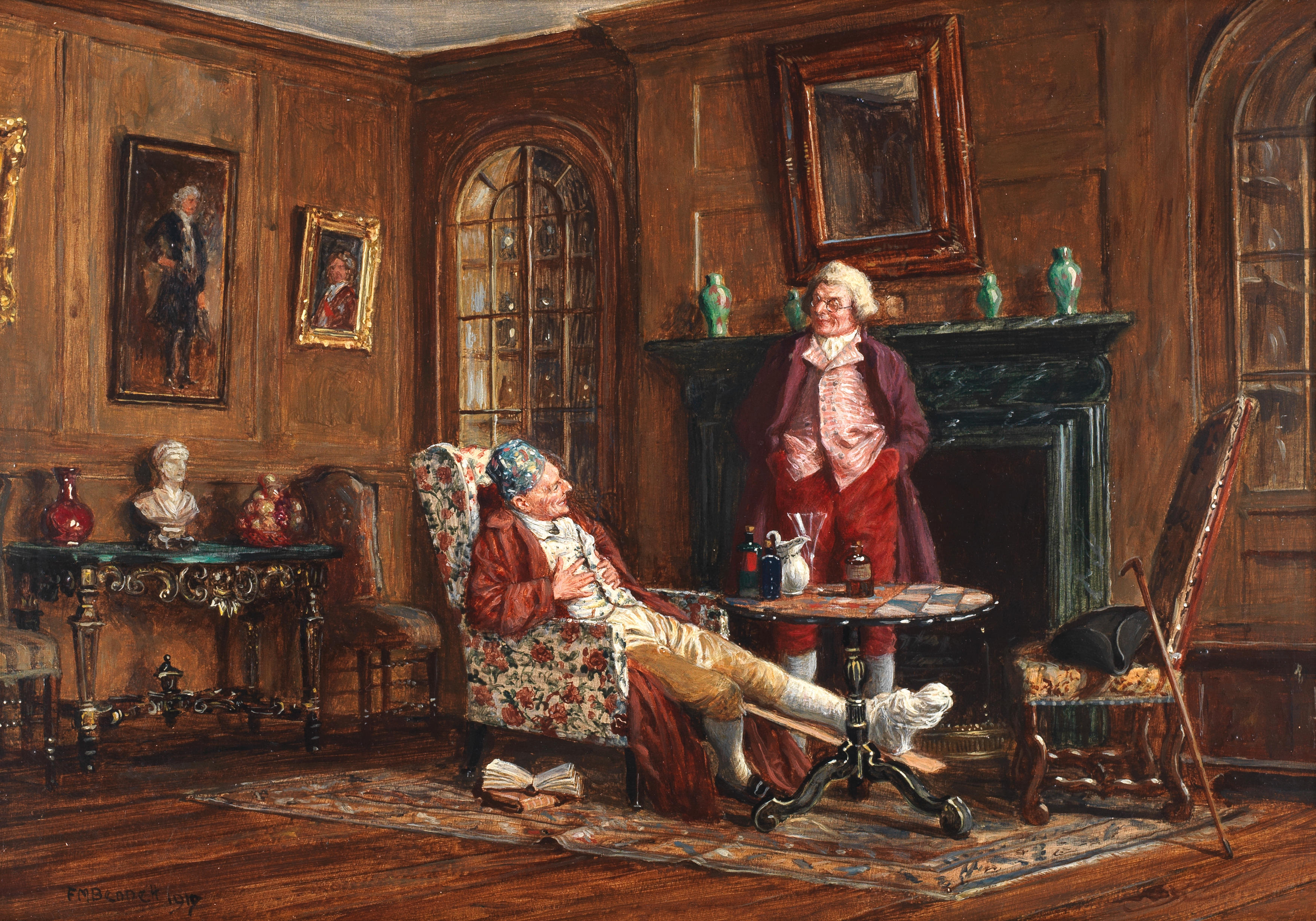
'The doctor's joke'. Oil on canvas. Signed and indistinctly dated 'FM Bennett 1919' (lower left)

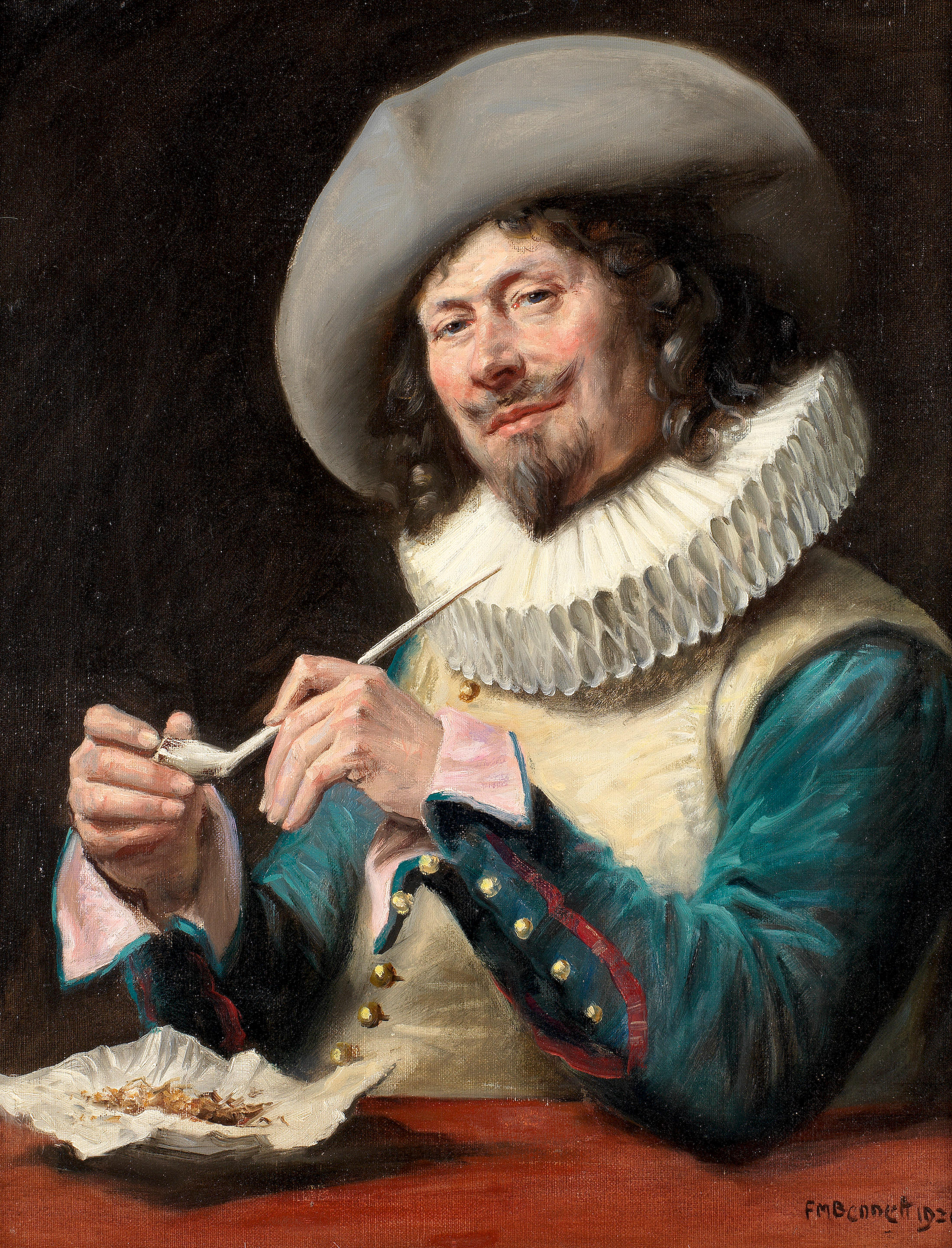
'Enjoying a clay pipe'. Oil on canvas. Signed and dated 'FMBennett 1926' (lower right)

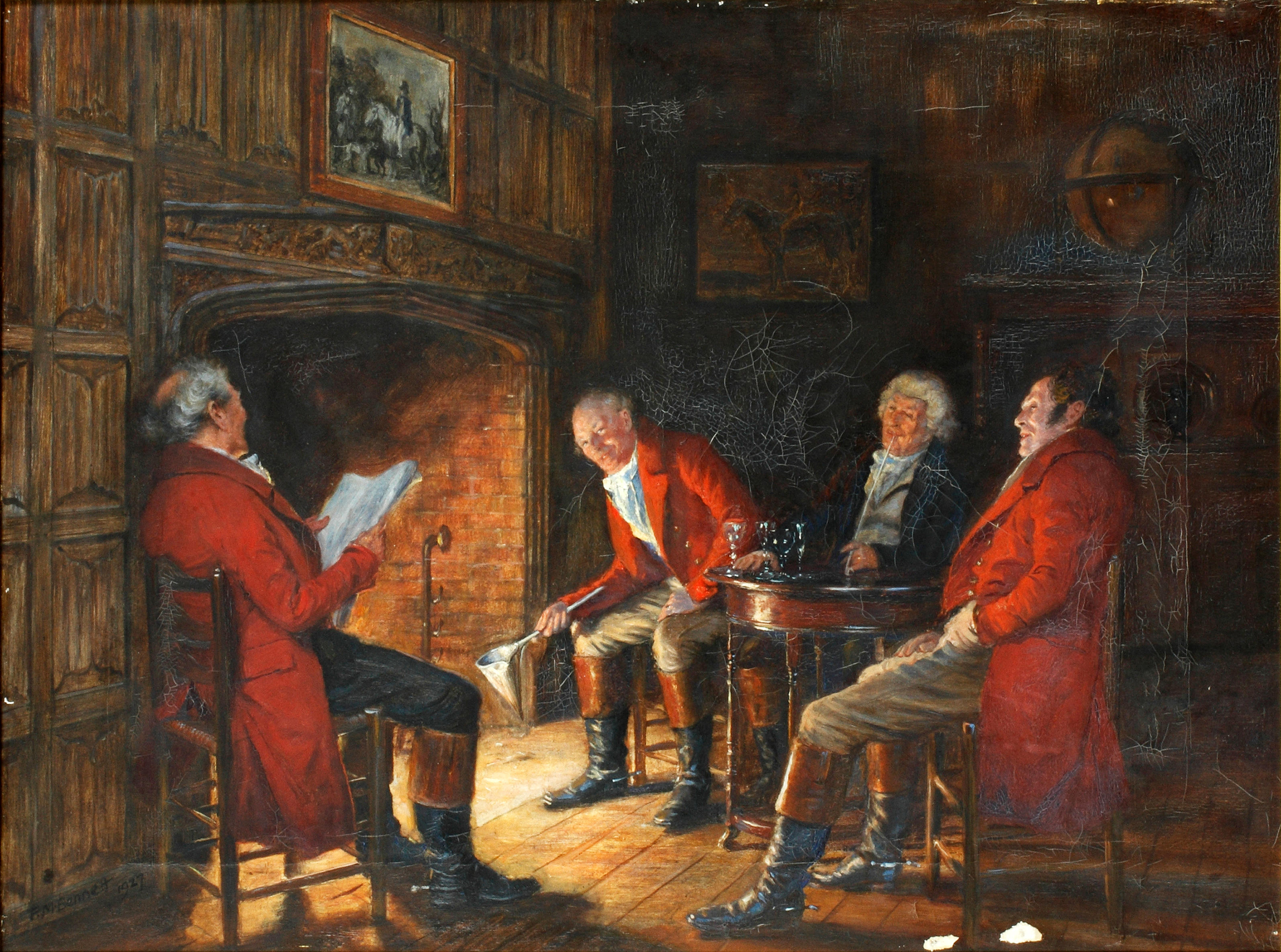
'Discussing the Hunt'. Oil on canvas. Signed and dated 'F M Bennett 1927' (lower left)
