= Bernard Evans =

Bernard Evans may refer to:

- Bernard Walter Evans (1843–1922), British landscape painter
- Bernard Evans (architect) (1905–1981), Australian army officer and architect
- Bernard Evans (footballer) (1937–2019), English footballer
- Bernie Evans (born 1957), Australian rules footballer

== See also ==
- Bernard Evans Ward (1857–1933), British painter who emigrated to the United States
