= Edward Wells =

Edward Wells may refer to:

- Edward Wells (theologian) (1667–1727), English mathematician, geographer, and controversial theologian
- Edward Wells (MP) (1821–1910), English Conservative Party politician, MP for Wallingford 1872–80
- Edward Curtis Wells (1910–1986), director of Boeing Company, designer of the Boeing 747
- Edward Wells (RNZAF officer) (1916–2005), New Zealand flying ace of the Royal New Zealand Air Force
- Edward Francis Wells, British painter

== See also ==
- Wells (name)
