= Eileen Bell (artist) =

English artist and writer (1907–2005)

- Born: Eileen Elizabeth Jefferd Bowerbank; 28 October 1907; Bristol, England
- Died: 27 January 2005 (aged 97); Leiston, Suffolk, England
- Spouse: Randall Bell

Eileen Bell (28 October 1907 - 27 January 2005) was an English artist and writer.

== Career ==
Eileen Bell was born in Bristol and entered St John's Wood School of Art at the age of 32 and also studied at the Anglo-French Art Centre in London in 1945. She continued to paint but also undertook textile design work for the Council of Industrial Design, designed sets and exhibition stands and did some advertising work.

In the late 1960s Alan Titchmarsh met Bell and attributes this relationship to be his main early cultural influence. During a period of incapacitation due to a broken arm, she wrote two children's books: Tales from the End Cottage (1970) and More Tales from the End Cottage (1972). Bell continued to produce work into her nineties and her work was extensively exhibited throughout her career, notably with the Artists' International Association, the London Group and at the Duncalfe Galleries in Harrogate during 1988. In 2003 she had a career retrospective at the Chappel Galleries. A studio sale of her work was held at Christie's in 2005 after her death at Leiston in Suffolk.
