= Gladys Baker =

British artist (1889–1974)

- Born: Gladys Marguerite Baker; 14 October 1889; St Pancras, London, England
- Died: 1974 (aged 84–85); England
- Education: Queen's College, London: St John's Wood Art School; Royal Academy Schools
- Occupation: Artist
- Known for: Portrait painting

Gladys Marguerite Baker (14 October 1889 – 1974) was a British portrait painter.

== Biography ==
Gladys Baker was born in the St Pancras district of London to Sarah Jane née Rudman and Joseph Baker, a warehouse worker and later a clothing manufacturer, who together had nine children.

She was educated at Queen's College and then studied at the St John's Wood Art School before entering the Royal Academy Schools. There Baker won a Graphic Prize and a silver medal for composition in colour. During her career Baker painted portraits in oils and watercolours and also created still lifes, landscapes and decorative pieces. Between 1916 and 1947, she regularly showed works at the Royal Academy in London. Between 1917 and 1969, Baker showed a total of 103 works with the Society of Women Artists and was elected a member of the society in 1931. She also exhibited works in Liverpool, Stockholm and New York City. Baker lived in London throughout her life, at Tavistock Square, then Finchley and finally in Barnet.
