= Alfred Rozelaar Green =

British painter

- Born: Alfred Rozelaar; 14 July 1917; London, England
- Died: 7 July 2013 (aged 96); Paris, France
- Known for: Painting, Pastel
- Awards: RWA

Alfred Rozelaar-Green, RWA (14 July 1917 – 7 July 2013) was a British artist and founder of the Anglo-French Art Centre in St. John's Wood.

== Biography ==
Rozelaar-Green was the only child of Leon Rozelaar and his wife Stella Mosely. He spent two years studying physics, mathematics and engineering at Cambridge University before leaving for London and the Central School of Art in 1937. The following year, he went to Paris to study Fine Art at the Académie Julian and under the tutelage of the social-realist painter Marcel Gromaire. While in Paris, he met his first wife Nita Bassetti, an artist's model who had posed for Matisse, and together they had three sons.

== The Anglo-French Art Centre ==
On his return to London after World War II he set up the Anglo-French Art Centre in St. John's Wood, London, where he invited artists from France and beyond to exhibit and teach. These included Fernand Léger, Robert Couturier, Jean Lurçat, Germaine Richier, Óscar Domínguez, Marc Saint-Saëns, Oskar Kokoschka and Antoni Clavé. The Art Centre also received the support of British artists of the time, such as Francis Bacon, Henry Moore, Julian Trevelyan, Graham Sutherland and Victor Pasmore, who visited and lectured frequently.

== Solo exhibitions ==
1959: Galerie du Colisée, Paris

1960: Galerie du Colisée, Paris / Galerie Les Calades, Avignon

1961: Galerie Saint-Placide, Paris / Galerie de la Chimère, St-Rémy-de-Provence / Musée de Carpentras

1962: Galerie Yvette Morin, Paris

1963: Musée d'Orange

1964: Galerie d'Art, Orange

1965: Woodstock Gallery, London

1966: Galerie La Calade, Avignon

1967: Maison de la Culture, Bourges

1968: Galerie Aktuaryus, Strasbourg

1969: Whibley Gallery, London / Vera Lazuk Gallery, New York

1971: Whibley Gallery, London

1972: Théâtre Municipal, Caen / Théâtre de Paris

1973: Galerie Jouvène, Marseille / Galerie des Orfèvres, Paris / Galerie Aktuaryus, Strasbourg

1974: Galerie Jouvène, Marseille

1975: Galerie Laverrière, Paris

1976: Galerie Aktuaryus, Strasbourg

1977: La Grande Chapelle, Cavaillon

1978: Galerie des Orfèvres, Paris / Galerie Torillec, Arras / Galerie Ro, Malines

1979: Galerie Horizons, Bruxelles

1980: Galerie Gorosane, Paris

1981: Galerie Horizons, Bruxelles

1982: Galerie des Peintres Européens, Cannes / Galerie Gorosane, Paris

1983: Galerie Horizons, Bruxelles

1984: Galerie Vyncke-Van Eyck, Ghent / Galerie Saint-Hubert, Lyon

1985: Galerie Munsterberg, Bâle / Galerie Quintessens, Utrecht

1986: Galerie Saint-Hubert, Lyon / Galerie Horizons, Bruxelles

1987: Galerie Colette Dubois, Paris

1988: Galerie Alfa Corinne Le Monnier, Le Havre / Galerie Saint-Hubert, Lyon

1989: Galerie Horizons, Bruxelles / Château Garneron, Mercurey / Galerie Mercedes, Voorschoten La Haye

1990: Galerie Voldere, Paris

1991: Galerie Mercedes, Voorschoten La Haye / Galerie Alfa Corinne Le Monnier, Le Havre / Galerie Horizons, Bruxelles

1992 : Galerie Saint-Hubert, Lyon

1993: Galerie Horizons, Bruxelles

1994: Galerie Alfa Corinne Le Monnier, Le Havre

1995: Galerie Smelik et Stokking, Den Haag / Galerie Patrice Alexis, Thonon

1996: Galerie Horizons, Bruxelles

1997: Château du Logis, Brecey / Chapelle de la Visitation, Thonon / Galerie Saint-Hubert, Lyon

1998: Galerie Courcoux, Stockbridge

1999: Fine Art Gallery, Bath / Fine Art Gallery, Bristol / Galerie Alfa Corinne Le Monnier, Le Havre

2000: Hôpital de Saint-Maurice

2001: Galerie Saint-Hubert, Lyon

2002: Galerie Laetitia, Brie Comte-Robert
