= Gladys Barron =

British artist

Gladys Caroline Barron née Logan (1884–1967) was an English sculptor and painter renowned for her portraiture.

== Personal life ==
Barron was born in Bengal, India, to Ismay Bellew Adams and Maxwell Beckett Logan. She returned to England during childhood, spending some early years in St Albans and studying in London before moving to Scotland.

Logan studied under Gertrude Bayes (née Smith) at the St John's Wood Art School in London. She married Evan Barron (1879–1965), historian and owner and editor of The Inverness Courier newspaper. They lived at Westerlea House, owned by Gladys Barron until her death in 1967 when it was bought and converted into a hotel.

== Artwork ==
Barron exhibited regularly at the Royal Scottish Academy from 1925 to 1964. From 1946 to 1953 she exhibited at the Royal Glasgow Institute of the Fine Arts. Barron was also a regular exhibitor at the Royal Academy, exhibiting from at least 1931 with the bronze bust William Lawrence, Esq. to 1959 with Jawi, North Borneo, also a bronze bust. Barron may have exhibited at the Royal Academy from 1912 with the bronze sculpture Echo under her maiden name, 'G. Logan'.

Gladys Barron was the first President of the Art Society of Inverness upon its founding in 1944.

== Works held in public collections ==
Title	Year	Medium	Gallery no.	Gallery	Location
Ann Baron	1960s	bronzed plaster	INVMG.1992.021	Inverness Museum and Art Gallery	Inverness, Scotland
Crucifix	1966	bronze & wood	INVMG.1978.256.001	Inverness Museum and Art Gallery	Inverness, Scotland
Dyak Boy	1950	clay	NARLI 20361	Nairn Museum	Nairn, Scotland
Earl of Moray	c.1960	clay	NARLI 2203.1	Nairn Museum	Nairn, Scotland
Evan Macleod Barron	1963	painted plaster	INVMG.1991.152.001	Inverness Museum and Art Gallery	Inverness, Scotland
Head of an Indian Soldier	1960s	clay	NARLI 20360	Nairn Museum	Nairn, Scotland
John MacDonald (1886–1970)	-	bronze	ABDUA:30479	University of Aberdeen	Aberdeen, Scotland
Jonathan Warre of Dalcross	1960s	painted plaster	INVMG.1978.256.002	Inverness Museum and Art Gallery	Inverness, Scotland
Kikuki	c.1960	clay	NARLI 2203.2	Nairn Museum	Nairn, Scotland
Neil Gunn, 1891 - 1973. Novelist	-	plaster	PG 2783	National Galleries of Scotland	Edinburgh, Scotland
Sir Alexander Malcolm MacEwan (1875–1941)	1934 (exhibited)	bronze	ITH_ARTUK_07	Inverness Town House	Inverness, Scotland
Sir Murdoch Macdonald (1868–1957), KCMG	-	bronze	ITH_ARTUK_12	Inverness Town House	Inverness, Scotland
Sir Thomas Murray Taylor (1897–1962), CBE, FRSE, DD, LLD	1962 or before	bronze	ABDUA:30158	University of Aberdeen	Aberdeen, Scotland
Tom Johnson, Freeman of Inverness	1966	painted plaster	INVMG.1978.256.003	Inverness Museum and Art Gallery	Inverness, Scotland
