= Anglo-French Art Centre =

Former art school in St John's Wood, England

Coordinates: 51.5305°N 0.1743°W

The Anglo-French Art Centre (or Anglo-French Art School, previously the St John's Wood Art School, was an art school at 29 Elm Tree Road in St John's Wood, north London, England.

The centre was founded in 1946 by Alfred Rozelaar Green, who studied in Paris at the Académie Julian and Atelier Gromaire before the Second World War. He moved to London at the end of the war and aimed to revolutionise British art education. He invited artists from France and other countries to exhibit and teach. Artists included Robert Couturier, Fernand Léger, André Lhote, Jean Lurçat, Fred Klein, Agnès Capri and Germaine Richier. He was also supported by English artists who visited to give lectures, including Francis Bacon, Henry Moore, Victor Pasmore and Julian Trevelyan. Other lecturers included art critics and museum directors.

Students included Dora Holzhandler, Anne Dunn, Breon O'Casey.

Forty-Eight Theatre, a company formed and supported by Velona Pilcher and directed by David Tutaev, rehearsed and performed at the centre in the late 1940s.

The centre closed in 1951.
