= St John's Wood Art School =

Former art school in St John's Wood, England

Coordinates: 51.5305°N 0.1743°W

The St John's Wood Art School (a.k.a. The Wood or Calderon's Art School) was an art school in St John's Wood, north London, England.

The Art School was established in 1878 and was located on Elm Tree Road. It was founded by two art teachers, Elíseo Abelardo Alvarez Calderón (1847–1911) and Bernard Evans Ward. Lewis Baumer, Byam Shaw and Frank Cadogan Cowper were early students. Later students included Mina Loy, John Armstrong, Michael Ayrton, Gladys Baker, Gladys Barron, Eileen Bell, Enid Bell, Frank Beresford, Alice May Cook, E. Charlton Fortune, Marcia Lane Foster, Meredith Frampton, Kenneth Martin, G. K. Chesterton, John Minton, Olive Mudie-Cooke, Isobel Lilian Gloag, Edward Tennyson Reed, Ursula Wood, Ivan Peries, Herbert James Draper, Flora Lion, Gluck, Leonard Walker and C. R. W. Nevinson. Aina Onabolu, the first African to study art in England was a student at the School from 1920 to 1922. Teachers at the School included Frederick Dudley Walenn, Vanessa Bell, John Piper, Leonard Walker and John Skeaping.

The School subsequently became the Anglo-French Art Centre, which was founded in 1946 by Alfred Rozelaar Green, who studied in Paris at the Académie Julian and Atelier Gromaire.
