= Bernard Evans Ward =

British-American painter

- Born: 1857
- Died: 1933 (aged 75–76)
- Occupation: Painter
- Known for: Figure and portrait painting

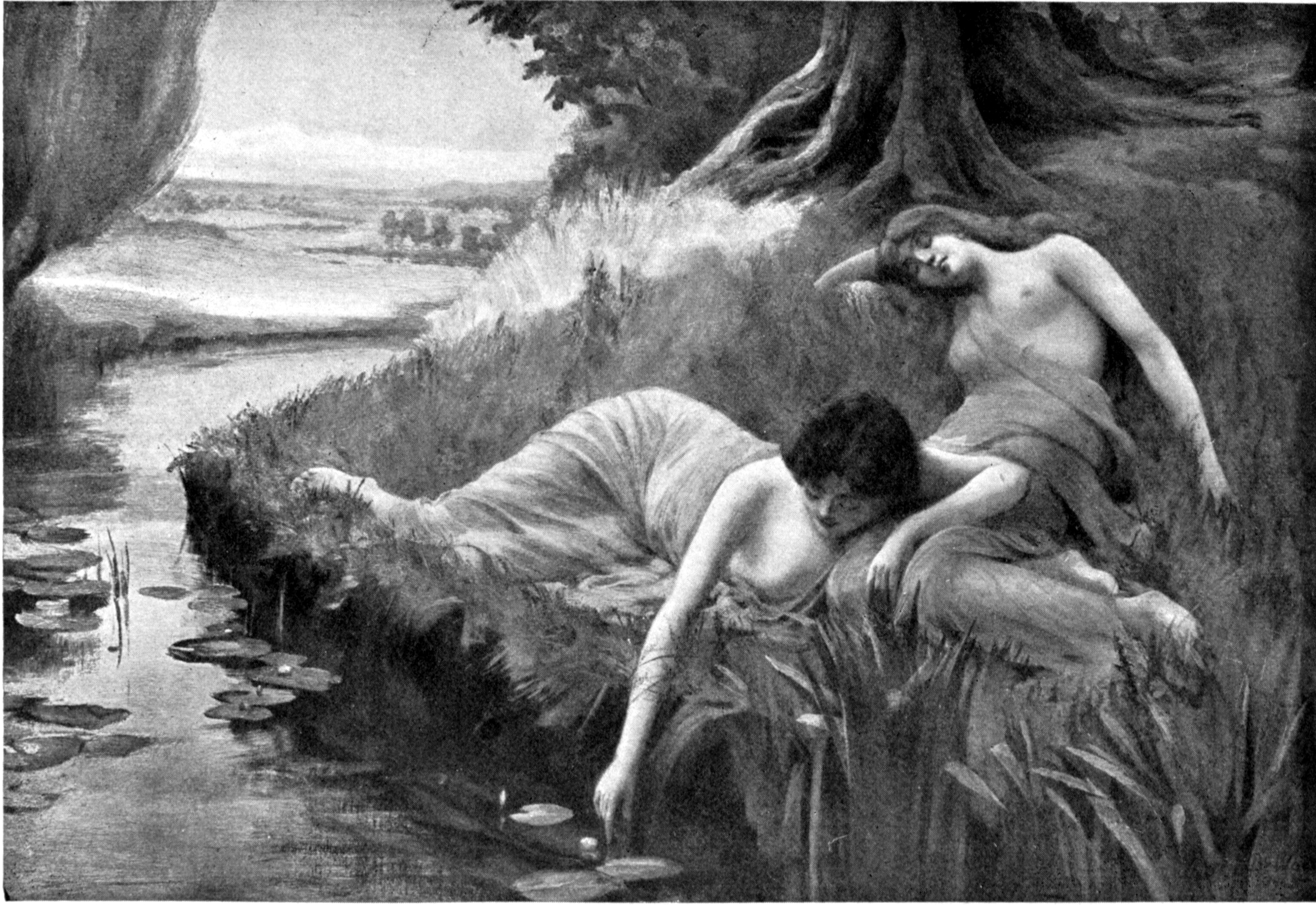
"Hulra's Nymphs" (1909) by Bernard Evans Ward

Bernard Evans Ward RBSA RSA RA RBA (Note: a list of British acronyms for titles in the honours system can be found in the pink pages of Debretts Peerage and Burkes Peerage) (1857 – August 3, 1933) was a British painter who emigrated to the United States.

== Life and creative work ==
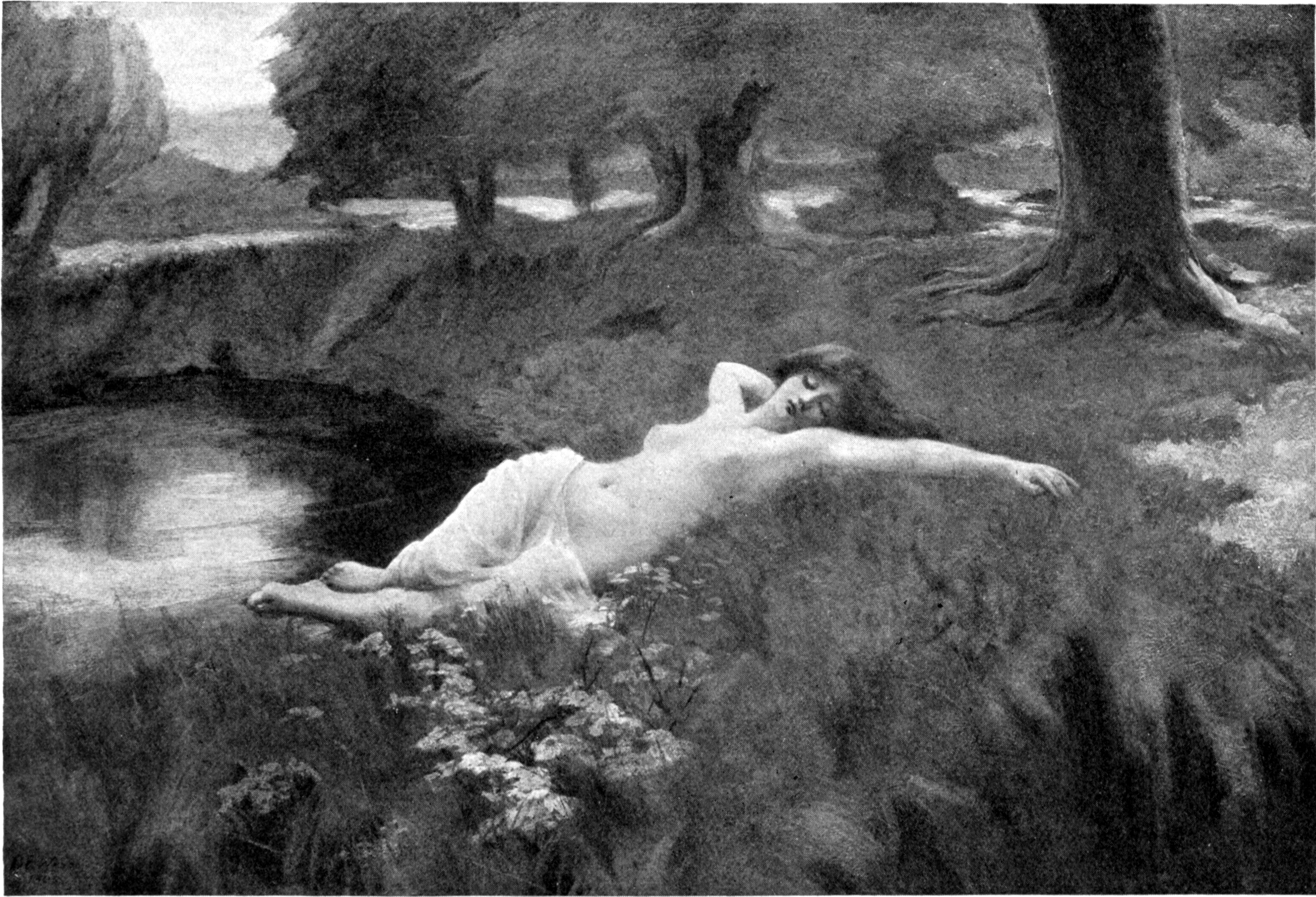
Idun by Ward

Born in London, Ward was a renowned painter of the Victorian era who won a gold medal for some of his works exhibited at the Royal Society of British Artists. In 1882 while still a student at the Royal Academy he won two silver medals. Then Bernard E. Ward founded, together with A. A. Calderon (1847–1911), London's St John's Wood Art School.

After a lawsuit had cost him his fortune, he emigrated to the United States, where he lived in 1913 near Cleveland, Ohio, where his daughter was a reporter for a London newspaper, possibly the Illustrated London News. Ward quickly made himself a name as a portraitist in his new hometown. In the early 1920s, the family lived for some time in Florida, before returning to Akron, Ohio, where Bernard Evans Ward died at the age of 76 in his granddaughter's house.

His works were exhibited at the Walker Art Gallery, Liverpool, at the Royal Birmingham Society of Artists, the Royal Scottish Academy, the Royal Academy of Arts and the Royal Society of British Artists.

== Selected works ==
- London Flower Girls, Piccadilly Circus, 1895, oil on canvas
- Mother and Child, oil on canvas
- Richmond Castle, Yorkshire, watercolor
- Escena rural, 1902

== Sources ==
- R.R. Bowker Company, American Federation of Arts: American Art Directory, 1933.
- "Death notice". The New York Times. August 5, 1933.
- Torchia, R. W.: Lost Colony: The Artists of St. Augustine, 1930-1950, Lightner Museum, Saint Augustine, Florida; October 2001. ISBN 0-9713560-0-9. URL last accessed September 10, 2008.
- Wood, Christopher et al. (eds.): Dictionary of Victorian painters (Dictionary of British Artists, vol IV), Woodbridge, 1991.
- An account from a member of the family. URL last accessed September 10, 2008.
