= Robert Couturier (sculptor) =

French sculptor (1905–2008)

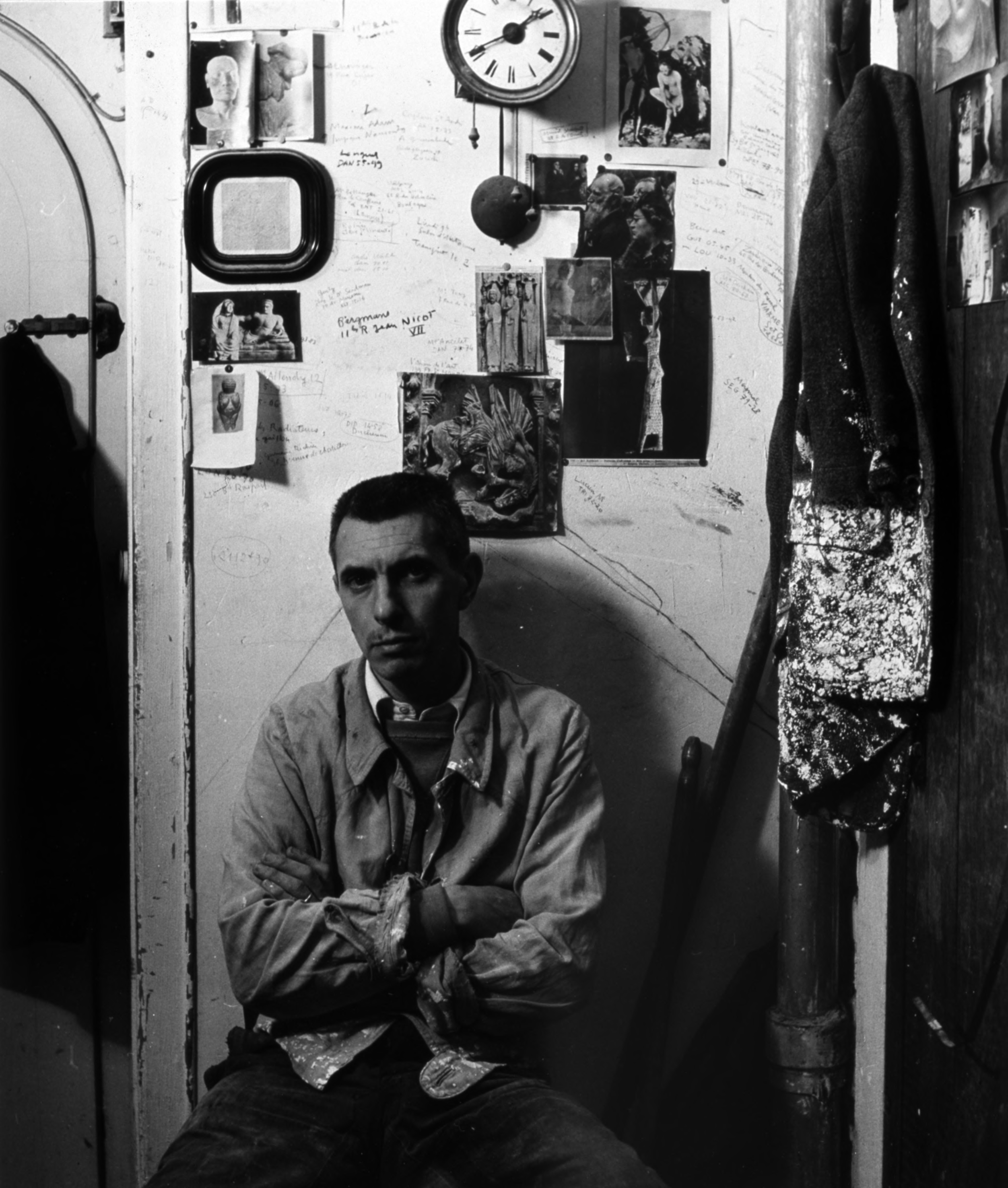
Robert Couturier (1948) (photo by Emmy Andriesse)

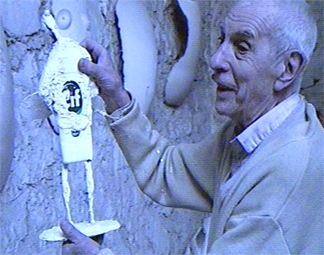
Robert Couturier

Robert Couturier (2 May 1905 – 1 October 2008) was a French sculptor. He was born in Angoulême.

== Biography ==
In 1920, Robert Couturier enrolled at the École Estienne in Paris, where he underwent lithography training. Two years later, following his father's death, he had to interrupt his studies and joined lithography workshops in Paris.

His encounter with Aristide Maillol in 1928 convinced him to pursue a career as a sculptor. He secured an artist's studio at the Parisian cité La Ruche.

In 1929, he met the sculptor Alfred Janniot. In 1930, Couturier received the Blumenthal Prize and, in 1932, became a drawing professor in Paris. During this period, he interacted with numerous painters, including Henri Matisse, from whom he received valuable advice.

As a former student of Aristide Maillol and a founding member of the Salon de Mai, Couturier was a recipient of the American Foundation for French Thought and Art in 1930. In 1937, he created sculptures for the Pavilion of Elegance at the International Exhibition in collaboration with architect Émile Aillaud. In 1938, he collaborated with Aristide Maillol on the work "La Rivière."

During World War II, he was captured but managed to escape and moved to the free zone. After the Liberation in 1946, he was appointed as a professor at the École des Arts Décoratifs in Paris, a position he held until 1962. Subsequently, he became a professor at the École Nationale Supérieure des Beaux-Arts de Paris (1963–1975).

In 1958, Couturier participated in the Universal Exhibition in Brussels.

In 1962, he played himself (a sculpture teacher) in Agnès Varda's film "Cléo from 5 to 7."

In 2005, the Dina Vierny-Musée Maillol Foundation in Paris dedicated a retrospective exhibition to him for his centenary.

As a founding member of the Salon de Mai, recipient of the American Foundation for French Thought and Art (1930), and the Wildenstein Prize (1966), 23 of Couturier's works are listed in the inventory of the National Fund for Contemporary Art.

His works are displayed in museums in Paris and abroad, including Bayeux, Poitiers, Grenoble, Troyes, Paris (National Museum of Modern Art-Centre Georges Pompidou; Museum of Modern Art of the City of Paris), Madrid, Rio de Janeiro, Boston, Jerusalem, Hakone, Antwerp, Havana.
