= Ina Williams =

Ina Williams may refer to:

- Ina Maud Sheldon-Williams (1876–1956), British artist
- Ina Phillips Williams (1876–1934), American politician
- Queenie Williams (1896–1962), Australian child actress
