= Ellis Martin =

Ordnance Survey map and book cover illustrator

- Born: 12 November 1881; Plymouth, United Kingdom
- Died: 30 September 1977 (aged 95); Sussex
- Occupation: Commercial illustrator
- Known for: Ordnance Survey map covers
- Spouse: Mabel Verstage (m. 1910, died)

Ellis Martin (1881–1977) was an English commercial artist. For most of his working life he was employed by Britain's map making organisation the Ordnance Survey, for which he performed painting, drawing and calligraphy for their map and book covers, and for their advertisements. He was the first person to be employed by the Survey specifically as an illustrator.

== Early life ==
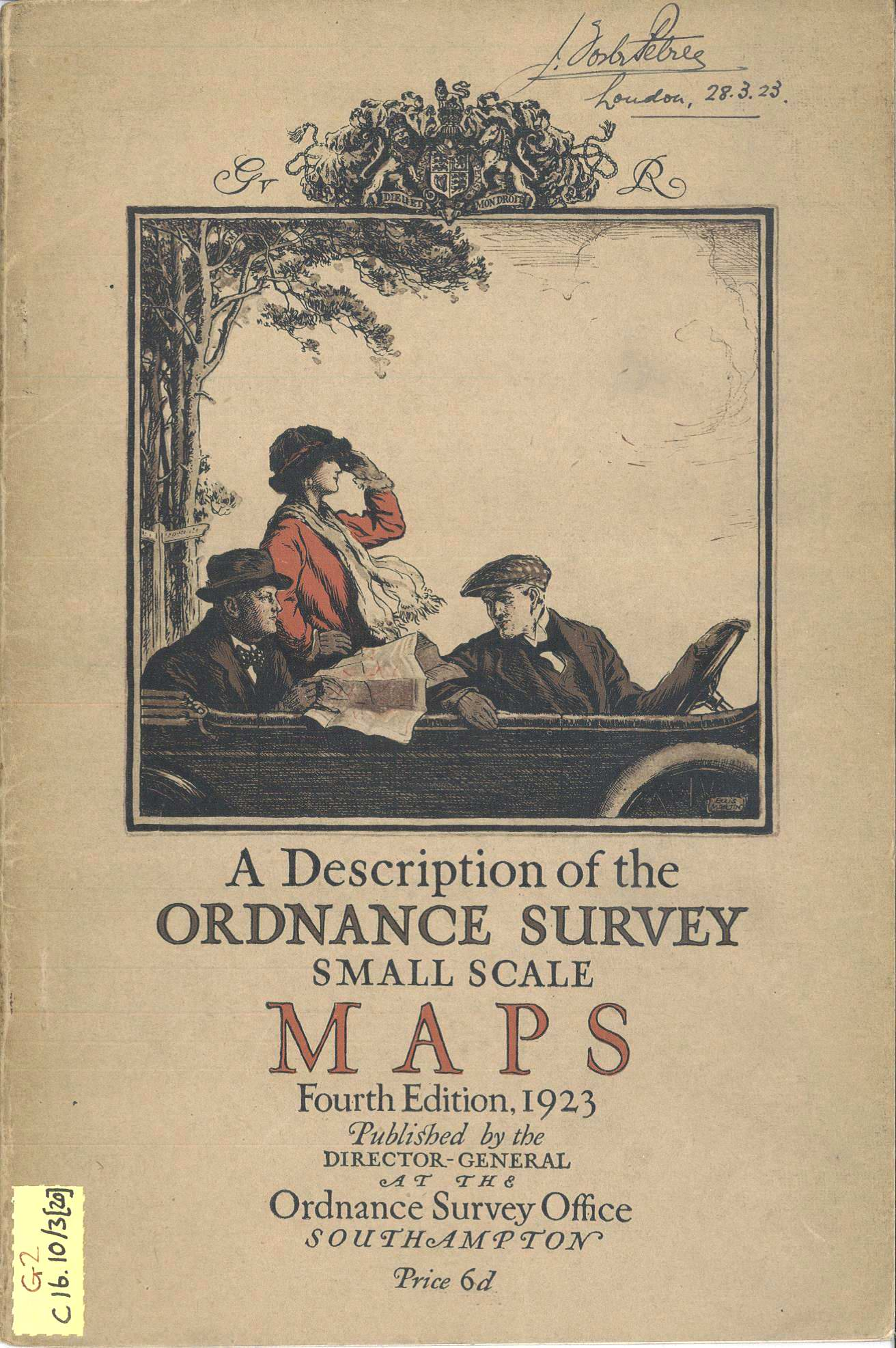
Ordnance Survey booklet cover by Martin (1919) (Note: Used on England and Wales/Scotland Tourist maps 1920. Also on A description of the Ordnance Survey Small Scale Maps 1919, 1920, 1921, 1923, 1925, 1927. The models are Martin's wife, brother and brother-in-law.)

Ellis Martin was born in Plymouth on 12 November 1881. He went to school at King's College School, Wimbledon and then went to the Slade School of Art where he was a contemporary of Augustus John.

He became a professional artist, sometimes hired as a full-time resident artist and at other times freelance, for example for Selfridges. He worked exclusively for the bookshop and news vendor W.H. Smith for six years, often drawing advertisements for the monthly magazine Advertising World which was published and printed by W.H. Smith, and for national newspapers. His work also appeared in The Newsbasket, W.H. Smith's staff magazine.

He married Mabel Verstage in 1910 and they had a daughter, Gentian, who died at an early age in 1940.

== Military service ==
On the outbreak of the Great War in 1914 he joined up as a sapper in the Royal Engineers where he was posted overseas. Later in the Royal Tank Regiment his work was as a field artist to produce maps and drawings of battle zones to aid the movements of troops in difficult terrain and for aiming heavy artillery accurately. Noticing his talent, a commanding officer suggested applying to work after the war for the Ordnance Survey which had been founded to provide military maps and during the war was exclusively producing maps for the military.

== Career with Ordnance Survey ==
=== Ordnance Survey up to 1918 ===
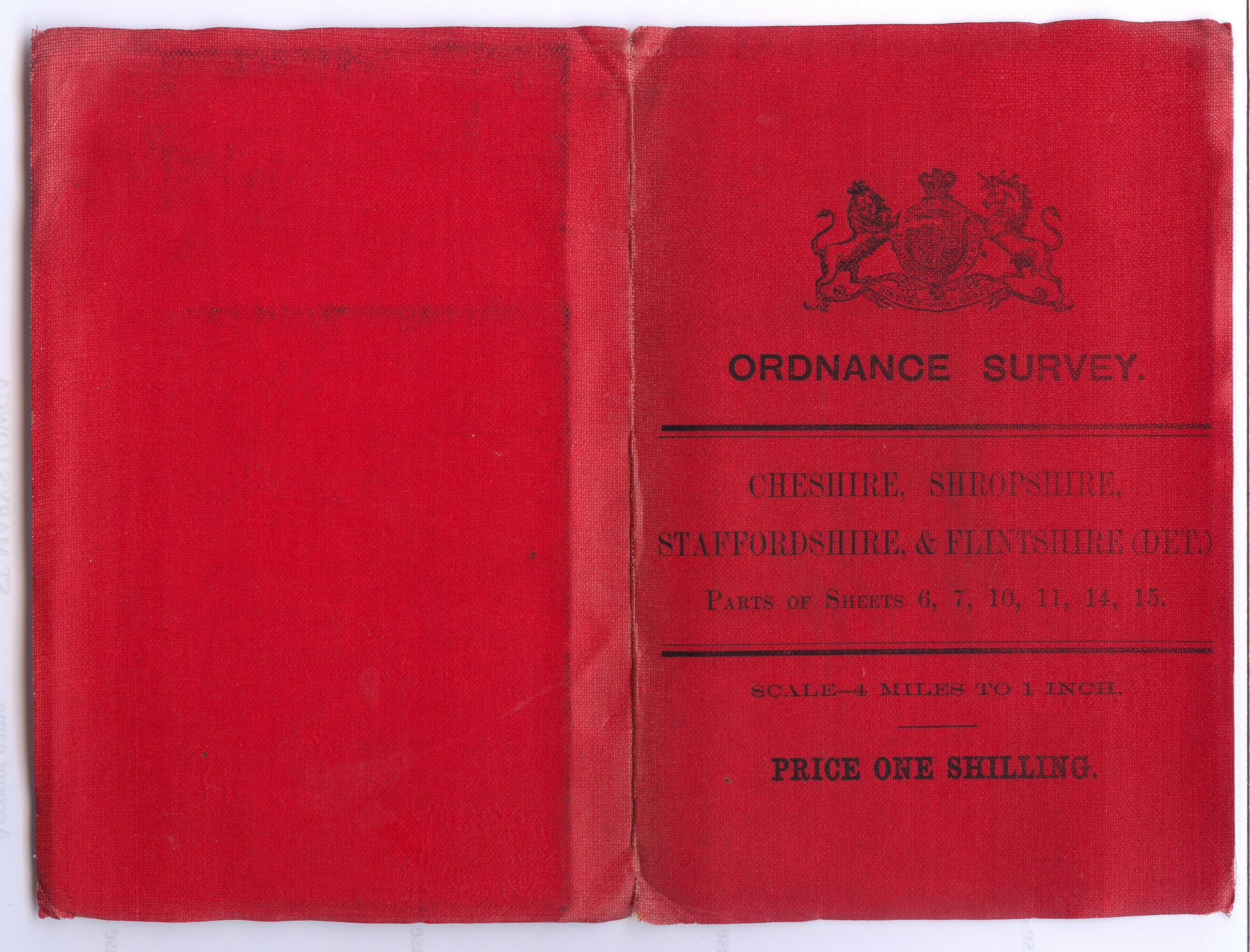
Example Ordnance Survey map cover, 1902

By 1914 the Ordnance Survey, a government department, had the reputation for producing "the best maps in the world". Sales were to the War Office and to civil administrative departments, primarily of large-scale maps, but it had less interest in providing maps for the general public so the presentation and advertising was perfunctory. Commercial firms copied the Ordnance Survey work (either with or without permission) to produce publications with attractive covers, sometimes improperly describing their maps as "Ordnance" or even "Ordnance Survey", and sometimes the actual cartography was of a poor standard. Such maps sold profitably and well.

A three-man committee under Sir Sydney Oliver was set up to investigate the matter and it recognised that new leisure pursuits such as cycling and motoring would lead to a considerable demand for small-scale maps, such as 1 inch to 1 mile (1:63360). Those that were available from the Ordnance Survey were very poorly distributed with covers that were flimsy and mundane and gave little clue as to what was inside. The committee recommended that, in particular, maps should be widely advertised and they should have robust, attractive covers. However, before any improvements could get underway, war broke out, many staff went into active service, and only war maps were to be produced.

=== Martin's artistic work ===
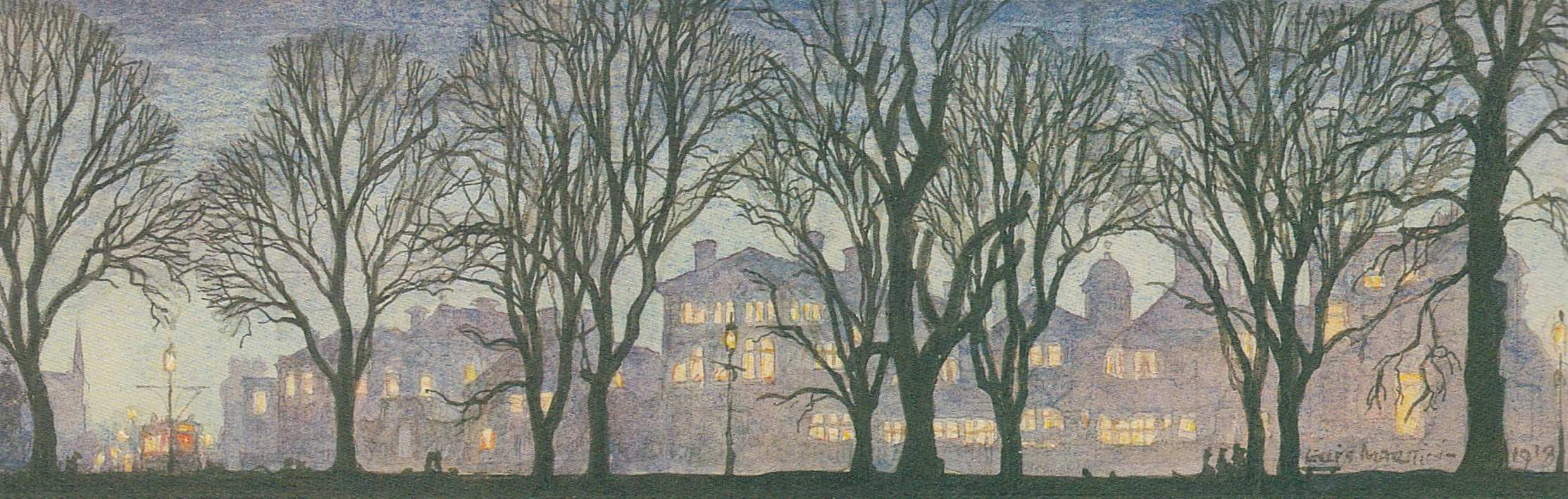
Official 1918 staff Christmas card by Martin

Taking the advice of his commanding officer (who possibly knew of the work of the Oliver Committee), in 1918 Martin applied for a job by submitting a watercolour and crayon design for a Christmas card – the building depicted is the headquarters of the Ordnance Survey in Southampton. The Director General Charles Close appointed him to a new post as the Survey's first full-time artist. Martin started in May 1919 with his picture already having been used for the Survey's official 1918 staff Christmas card. He lived and worked in Southampton and earned a salary of 10/- (50p) a week, comparable to that of an agricultural labourer in the 1890s. He went on to design several more staff Christmas cards and, less ephemerally, the memorial stained glass windows for staff who had died in the War.

Martin designed the cover for a 1921 official report, one copy of which was sent by the Survey's Central Bureau, led by Harold Winterbotham, (Note: Brigadier Harold St John Loyd Winterbotham later became Director General of the Ordnance Survey.) to Arthur Hinks, the rather irascible secretary of the Royal Geographical Society. Hinks wrote to Winterbotham "I have admired the cover, but have not yet dipped into the Report".

According to the Survey's 1921 Annual Report, map sales rose considerably to the highest ever in the Survey's history. Close thought this "curious" because the price had been significantly increased and he thought an important aspect was the attractive nature of Martin's covers. Indeed, he gave tribute to Martin's work and submitted some of them to the 1921 Exhibition of British Industrial Art.

==== 1920s individual covers ====
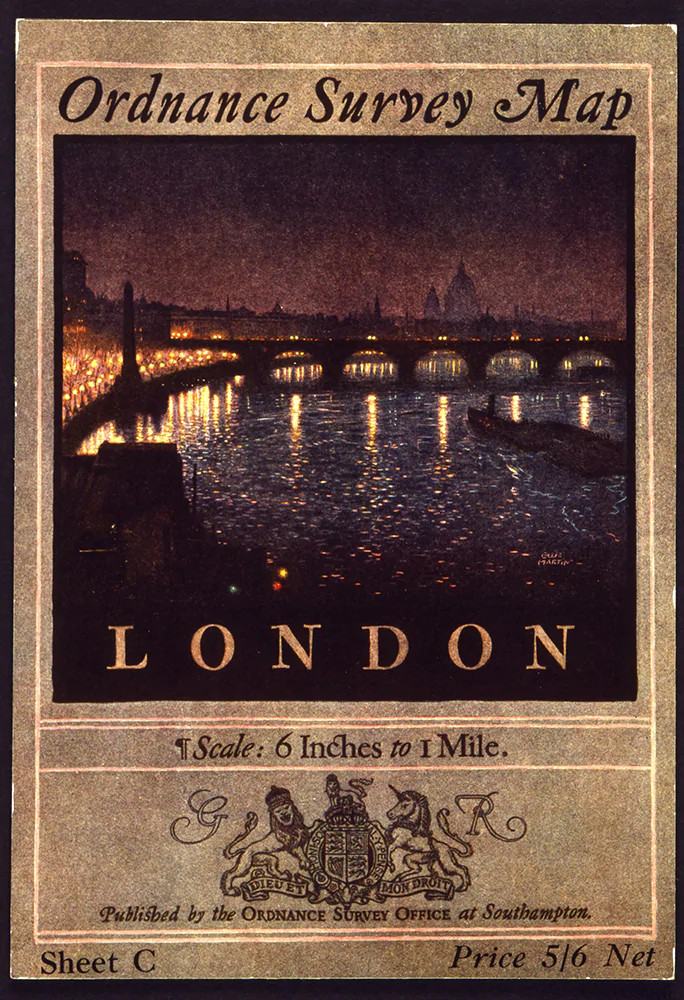
River Thames (1920)

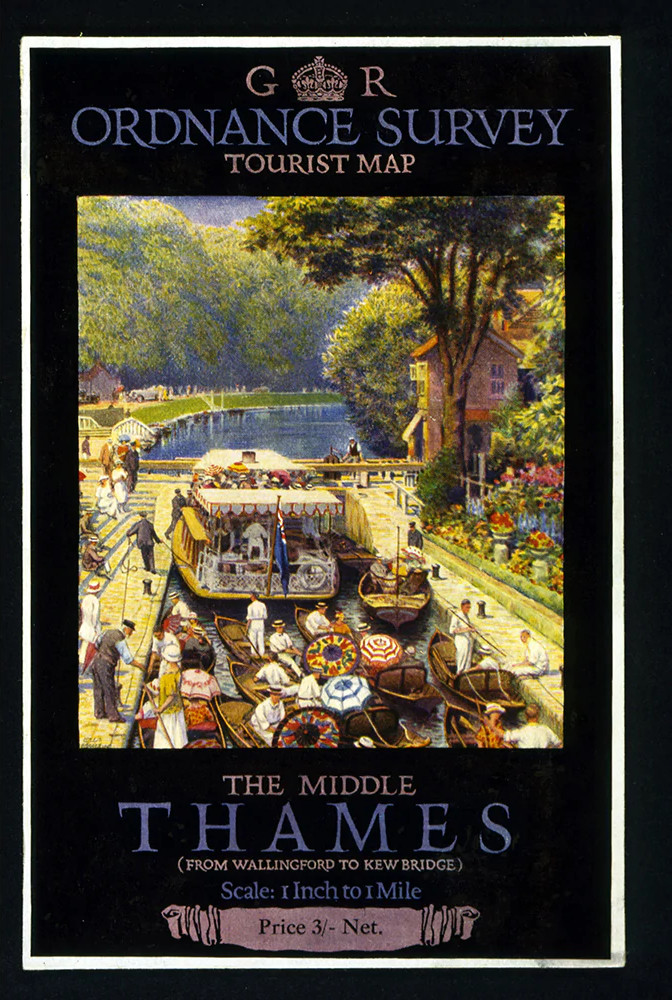
Middle Thames (1923)

Martin's work was primarily to create the covers for Ordnance Survey maps for which he was the person mainly responsible from 1919 to when he retired in 1940.

One of his earlier ambitious works was for a 20-sheet six-inch map of London. The picture is a night scene looking at the River Thames downstream from Hungerford Bridge. As with all his map covers, the calligraphy and Royal Arms were individually hand drawn. What is often considered Martin's finest work is his 1923 painting for The Middle Thames set at Boulter's Lock at Maidenhead. Browne considers it to be the high point in Ordnance Survey cover art.

==== Standard covers ====
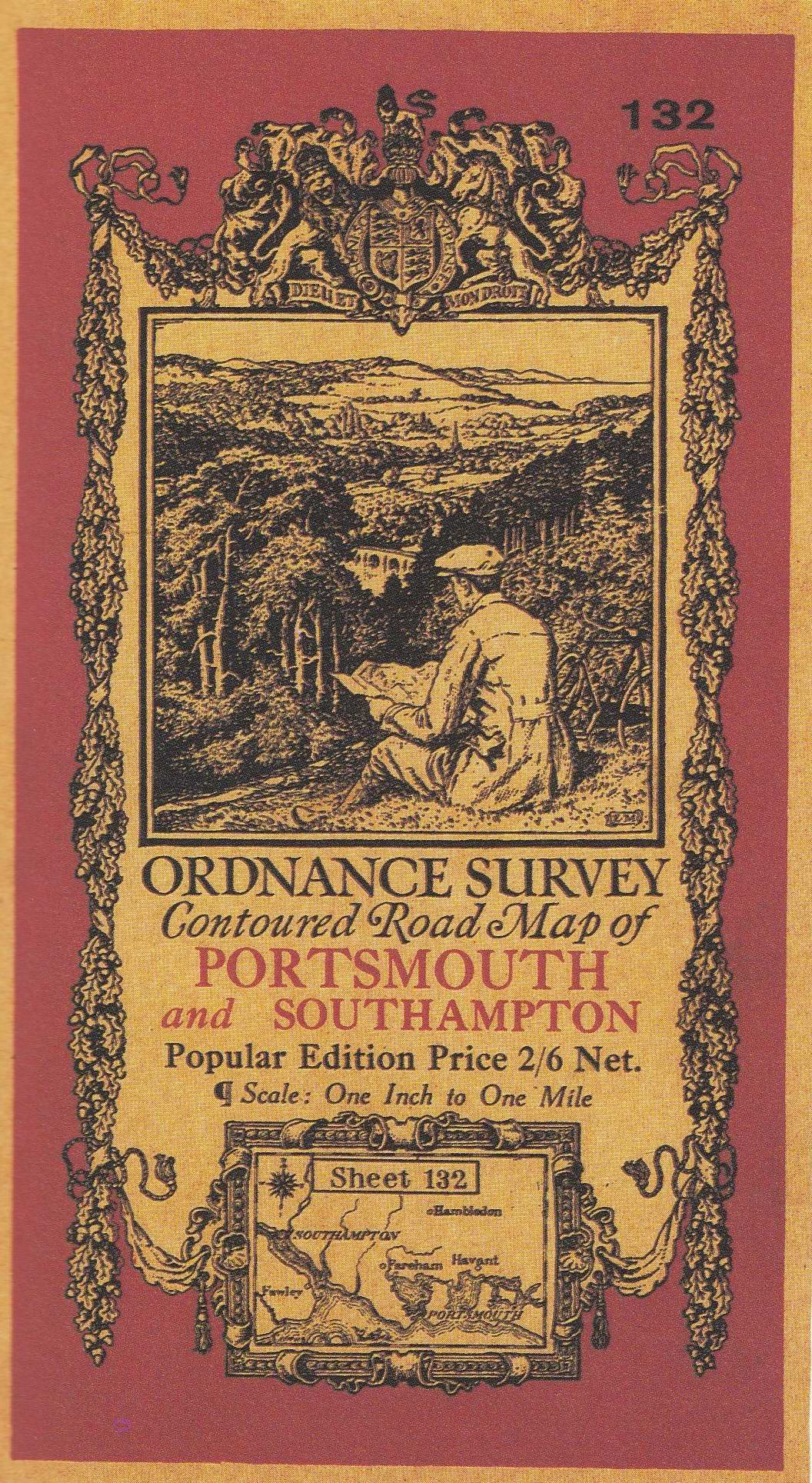
Popular Edition (1919)

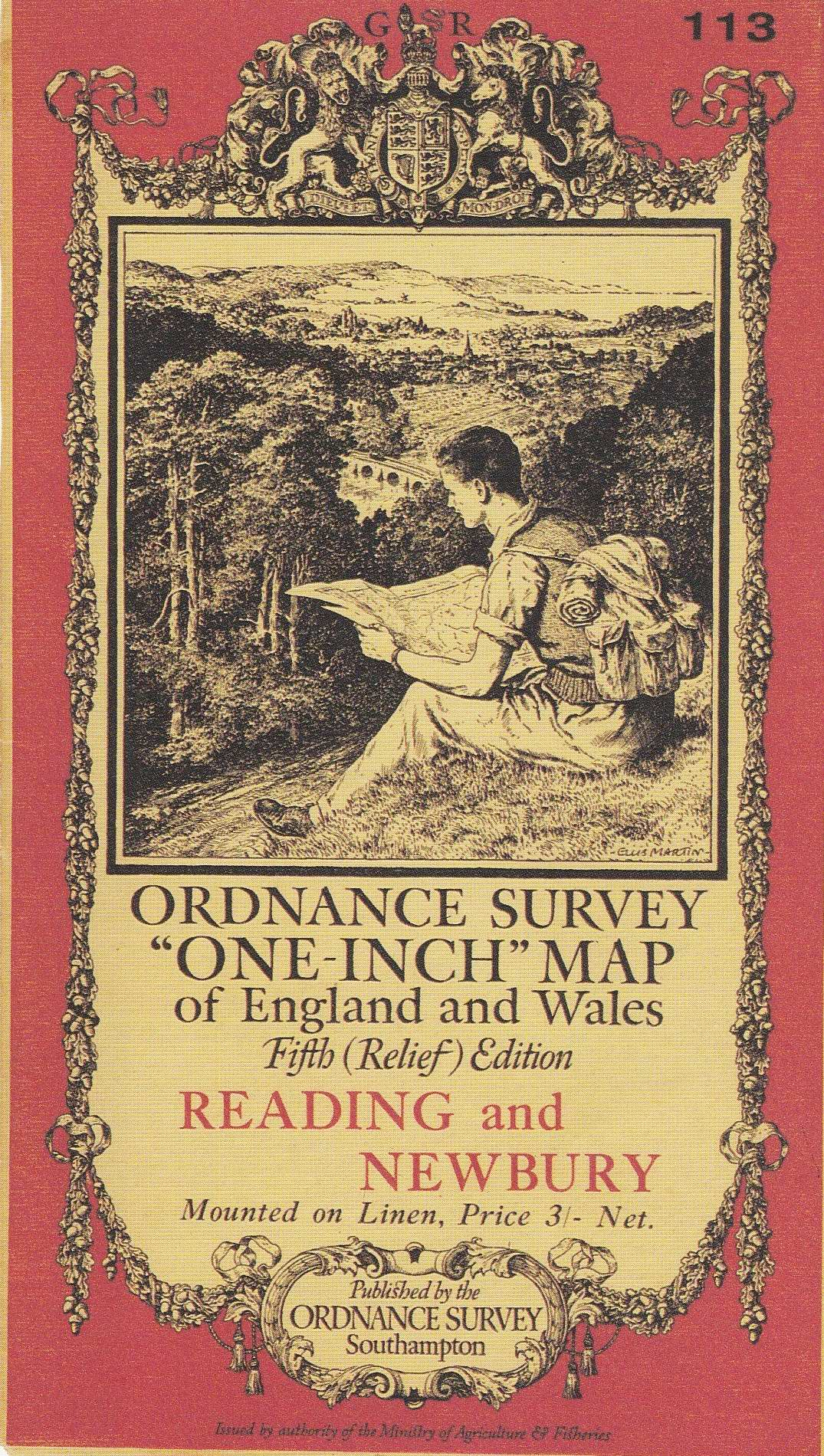
Fifth Edition (1931)

His most famous map cover was for the Survey's "Popular Edition" series of 1-inch maps which were current throughout the 1920s. (Note: The same cover was used for all maps except for the Isle of Man.) (Note: When an individual cover design was specific to a particular sheet it was technically known as an "own cover".) The cyclist shown is dressed in a Norfolk jacket, plus-fours and a tweed cap. When it was succeeded by the Fifth Edition of 1931, Martin's cover showed the figure wearing a shirt with rolled-up sleeves and a slipover – but the same view. These covers adorned the standard OS maps until the end of the Second World War and succeeded because Martin had reflected changing social attitudes.

==== 1930s covers ====
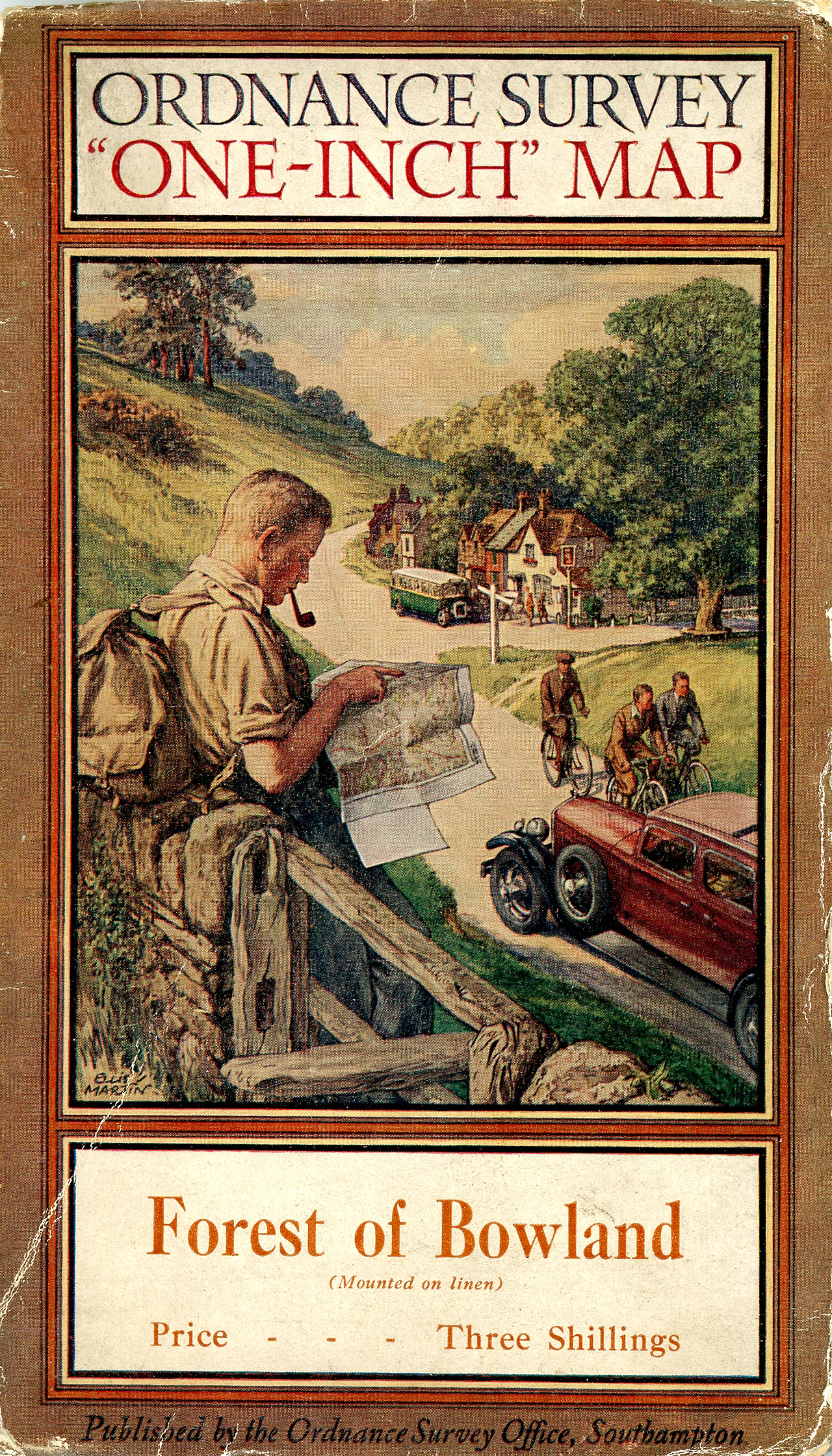
District and Tourist maps (1932)

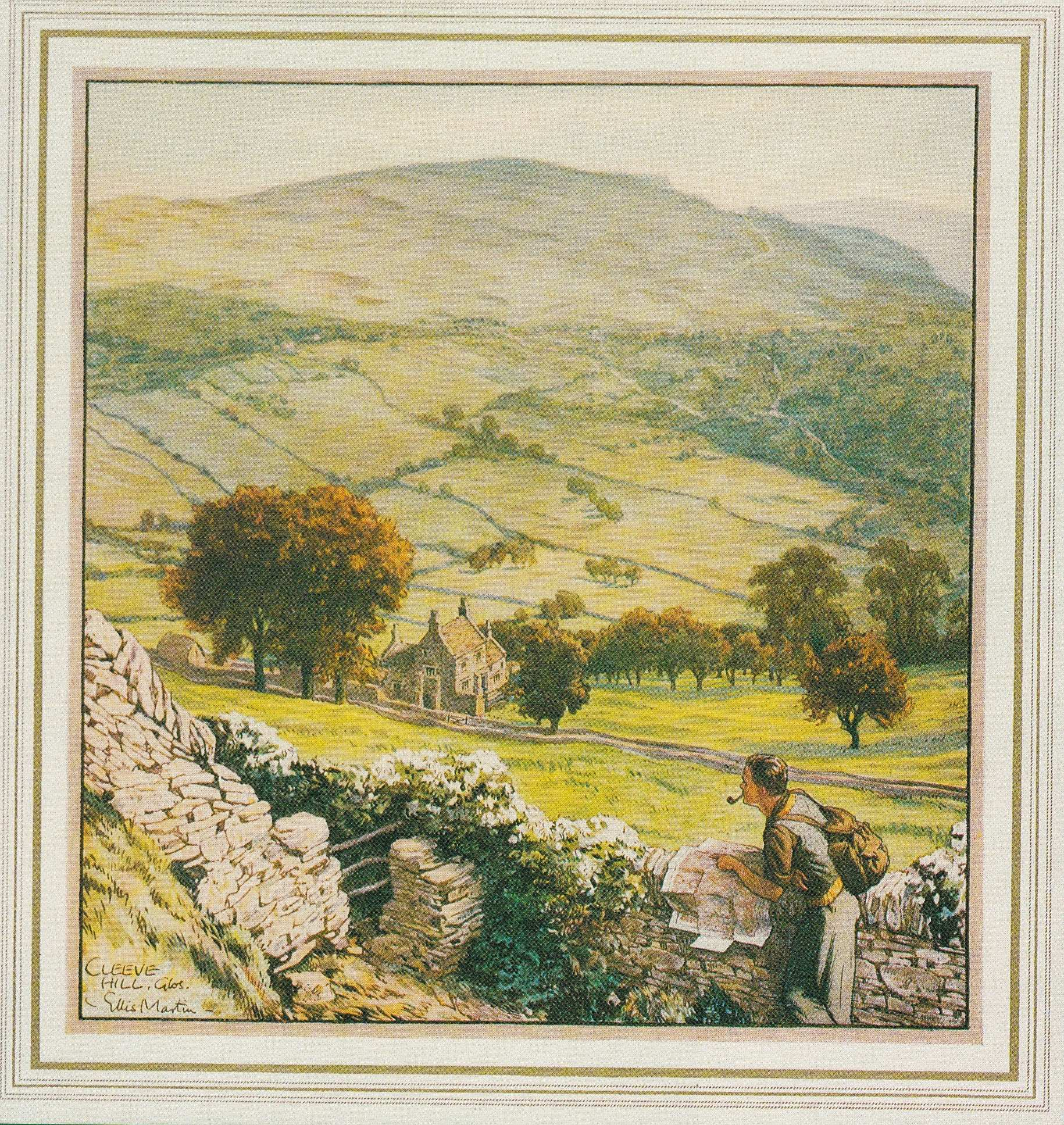
Cotswolds (Cleeve Hill) (1932)

For the series of 1-inch District and Tourist maps of the 1930s Martin had painted a full-colour scene for the waterproof covers. (Note: District and Tourist maps centred on areas of particular interest, spanning parts of several sheets. The Tourist maps had additional annotation for points of interest.) In 1969 Country Life opined

The picture contains six sensible people; one young hiker, three cyclists and the two locals standing outside a pub. The trippers (from the bus) are kicking it up inside. This cover represents the high art of map selling. It has four targets, walkers, cyclists, motorists and tourists en masse.

One of Martin's paintings of 1932 shows a hiker contemplating the climb up Cleeve Hill. It was used for an advertising display, a book cover, a Christmas card and also a special "own cover" for the half-inch and 1-inch Tourist maps of the Cotswolds.

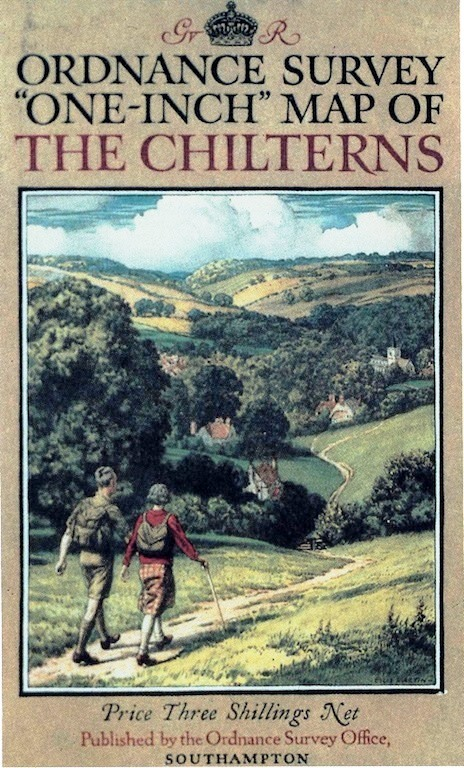
Chiltern Hills (1932)

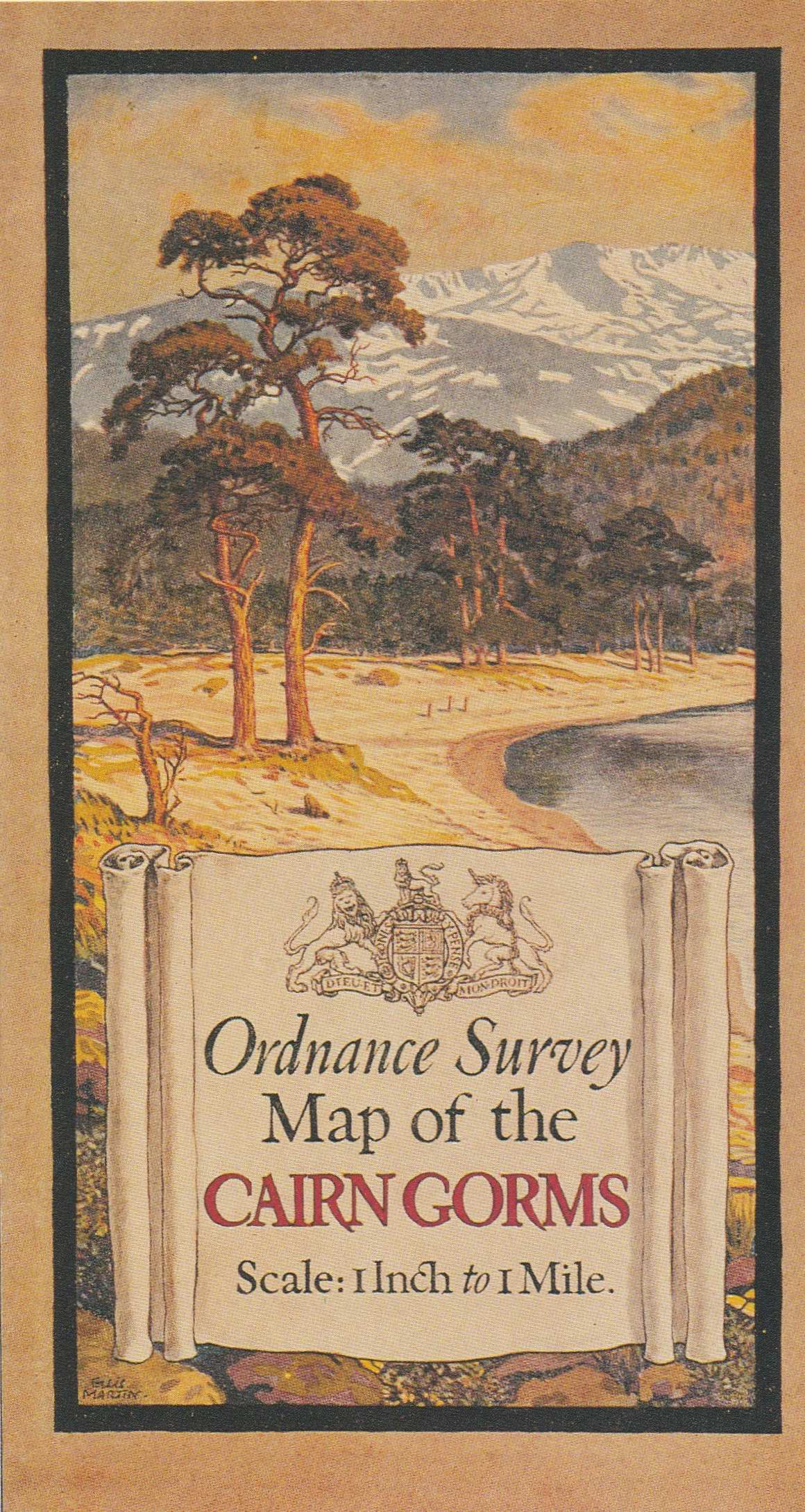
Cairngorms (1922, published 1936)

At this time the OS covers often showed a solitary but assured male wayfarer studying the route ahead, although for the Chiltern Hills cover of 1932 the man has a lady companion striding along beside him. The Cairngorms cover shows no people at all – to illustrate the Scots pine trees Martin decided to paint what he thought were better specimens on Southampton Common.

== Retirement and appreciation ==
When World War II broke out the Survey stopped producing new tourist maps and there were financial stringencies. Martin's post was abolished in November 1940 – later that month Southampton was devastated by bombing. The Survey's headquarters were not spared, and the memorial windows were destroyed. Martin retired to Sussex to be near his family and where he continued painting for pleasure. He died on 30 September 1977 in a nursing home.

Sven Berlin described the Ordnance Survey maps of the 1920s and 1930s as "old friends who guided you to unknown places" and John Paddy Browne wrote that "after the Second World War, the covers "were bereft of the innovation and imaginative flair which characterised the inter-War years." Despite that, Martin's work had in the inter-war years contributed to the Ordnance Survey maps' iconic status in Britain so that they now have a 95% share of paper map sales. There had been competition from other map making businesses but no other artist bore comparison with his artistic skill and flair.
