= Partou Zia =

English painter

- self portrait, 2008
- Born: 9 October 1958; Tehran, Persia
- Died: 19 March 2008 (aged 49)

Partou Zia (Persian: پرتو ضیاء; 9 October 1958 – 19 March 2008) was a British-Iranian artist and writer. Born in Tehran, she emigrated to England in 1970, completing her secondary education at Whitefields School near Hendon, London (1972–78). She studied Art History at the University of Warwick (1977–80) and Fine Art at the Slade School of Fine Art (1986–91). In 1993, Zia moved to Cornwall, where she lived and worked with her husband, the painter Richard Cook, for the remainder of her life.

In 2001, she completed a practice-based from Falmouth College of Arts (University of Plymouth) with the dissertation Poetic Anatomy of the Numinous: Creative Passages into the Self as Beloved, her dissertation examined entry into the "poetic zone". As part of her Ph.D. thesis she created two boxed sets of images: 'A Head of her Time' (24 self-portraits) and 'Eve's Book of the Garden' (12 landscapes), each image with its corresponding prose.

In 2003, Tate St Ives launched a new residency programme at the historic Porthmeor Studios in St Ives, Cornwall, previously occupied by Borlase Smart, Ben Nicholson, and Patrick Heron. Zia was the first artist to be awarded the residency. Her solo exhibition at Tate St Ives, titled Entering the Visionary Zone, was accompanied by a catalogue with an essay by Virginia Button.

Zia died of cancer in March 2008. In her memory, Tate St Ives displayed one of her final paintings, Forty Nights and Forty Days, at the gallery’s entrance as a tribute. The same work also forms part of Modern and Contemporary British Art: The State We’re In (2000–Now) at Tate Britain.

== Work ==
Early in Partou’s career, landscape provided the main inspiration for her work. The quest of the individual for the divine was a developing theme. A fascination for religious iconography was manifested in depictions of the overlooked corners of church interiors. Everyday objects such as books, lamps and chairs inhabited her images of domestic scenes, suggesting a desire to capture the essence of her long-lost childhood home. Her canvases at this time were dominated by an energetic application of heavily impastoed yellow, which for her represented the spiritual. Self-portraits, some of them nude, also formed an important part of her oeuvre, asserting her identity as a woman and a painter, and to reveal her intuitive self.

In scale her works range from a few inches to several feet high, with characteristic free brushwork and an immediately recognisable energetic handling of layers of paint. Inspired by the writing and illustrations of William Blake, her work explores a personal journey of self-discovery. Her language is original, evolving a personal mythology of motifs and symbols that include lovers, sleepers, dreamers and readers, set within interiors or landscapes.

The paintings from the last few months of her life reflect a change of mood. The intense energy of her earlier canvases has given way to a more contemplative application of paint, as a consequence of her ill health. In ‘40 Nights and 40 Days’ she reclines, in classical garb, resting her elbow on a pile of books – an indication, perhaps, that her work is done.

== Notable works ==
- Towers of Silence (2001) – University of Warwick Art Collection
- The Sleep of Hands (2003) – Tate St Ives
- Cedar Notes (2004) – The Women's Art Collection, Cambridge
- Flowering Rod (2006) - Tate Collection
- 40 Nights and 40 Days (2008) – Tate Britain

== Collections ==
- British Museum, London
- Tate Collection, London
- University of Warwick Art Collection, Coventry
- The Women's Art Collection, Cambridge

== Solo exhibitions ==
2025 Partou Zia (1958 - 2008), Indigo+Madder, London

2013 Portraits Beyond Self, Art First, London

2008 In The Face of Wonder, The Exchange, Penzance

Memorial Exhibition 2008, Art First, London

2007 sometimes i see, Art First, London

2005 The Grey Syllable, Art First, London

2004 Thought Paintings, Art First, London

2003 Entering the Visionary Zone, Tate St Ives

2002 Art Space Gallery, London

2000 Art Space Gallery, London

Plymouth Art Centre

1999 Royal Cornwall Museum

1998 Newlyn Art Gallery

1997 Thornton-Bevan Arts, London

== Group exhibitions ==
2010 Meetings Of Dreams, The Wills Lane Gallery, St. Ives

2009 ZOOM – Looking Back/Looking Forward, Art First, London

2007 Art Now Cornwall, Tate St. Ives, Cornwall

2006 12x12 Art First, London

2004 Spoilt for Choice: A Christmas Show, Art First, London

1999 Four Young Artists, Art Space, London

1998 In/Sight, Exeter University

1997 Gallery Artists I, Reeds Wharf Gallery, London

A Sense of Place, Collyer Bristow Gallery, London

1996 Landscapes from Penwith, Hastings Museum and Gallery

1996 Spring Open, Connaught Brown, London

1995 John Moores Exhibition 19, Walker Art Gallery, Liverpool

1994 Response to Landscape, Beatrice Royal Gallery, Southampton

1993 Salthouse Gallery, St Ives

1992 Carpenters Road Studios, London

1990 Works on Paper, The Boundary Gallery, London

1989 Young Contemporaries, The Whitworth Gallery, Manchester
