= Richard Kendall-Norris =

Conservative Party politician and businessman

- Born: 1859; Exeter, England
- Died: 9 January 1921 (aged 61–62); Margate, England
- Education: King's College School
- Political party: Conservative Party
- Spouse: Beatrice Mary Stanbury Wilson (m. 1898–1921)

Richard Kendall-Norris (1859 – 9 January 1921) was an English Conservative Party politician and businessman.

== Early life and education ==
Kendall-Norris was born in 1859 in Exeter, England. He was the son of Samuel Norris, a wealthy woollen merchant. When his father died in 1879, he was to inherit Beacon Downes, Pinhoe, upon the death of his mother, who was left the property in his father's will.

He attended King's College School, an independent school in Wimbledon, London, from 1874 to 1877.

== Career ==
For many years, Kendall-Norris ran the firm Messrs. Norris, Collins and Co., wholesale woollen merchants. He left on 1 December 1888 by mutual consent.

Kendall-Norris was the leader of Young Exeter, a group who held the Bonfire Night celebrations at Cathedral Yard. The celebrations got "very rowdy" and in 1879 the Mayor of Exeter had to read the Riot Act. The last of these events took place in 1893.

In the 1880s, Kendall-Norris served as a Conservative Party councillor for the ward of St Petrock's, Exeter, and was Honorary Secretary of the Exeter Conservative Association.

Kendall-Norris joined the Gild of Weavers, Tuckers and Shearmen of Exeter in 1885. He was treasurer of the company, and appointed master in 1888.

== Personal life ==
Kendall-Norris married Beatrice Mary Stanbury Wilson in 1898.

On 9 January 1921, he died of heart disease while visiting Margate, Kent. His body was brought back to Exeter by train for a funeral service in St David's Church and burial in Higher Cemetery. His wife died at Eastbourne in 1940.
