= Elizabeth Merriman =

British painter (born 1963)

Elizabeth Merriman (born 1963) is a British painter who lives and works in East Anglia.

She completed her BA (Hons) in Fine Art at Canterbury College of Art in 1985 and followed this with a post-graduate higher diploma at the Slade School of Fine Art between 1985 and 1987. At the Slade her work was shortlisted for the Barclays Young Painter award. She exhibited works at the Contemporary Art Society at Smiths Galleries in 1987 and at the Porl Porl Gallery in Leeds, also in 1987. During 1989 she showed works at the Interior Design International Exhibition at Olympia and at the East End Open Studios and at Cable Street Studios in London. The actor Toby Jones has said of her work “These paintings are both figurative and abstract, but the degree to which they are is controlled by the artist’s emotional response. The colours are so bold and translucent and beautifully worked. They can be hugely joyful or melancholic, and these deceptively simple still lifes have a very mysterious effect on me".
