= Barry Daniels =

British artist, painter, and designer

Barry Daniels (1933–2010) was a British artist, painter, and designer.

== Early life ==
Barry Daniels studied at Slade School of Fine Arts in the 1950s with Lucien Freud, Henry Moore, Graham Sutherland, Phillip Sutton, Paula Rego, Euan Uglow, Michael Andrews and Bernard Cohen, taught by William Coldstream. He won the Wilson Steer prize for Landscape painting in 1953, the Abbey Minor Scholarship (1953), Boise Scholarship (1954) and French Government Scholarship (1958).

Barry exhibited at the ICA Six Young Painters and London Group Exhibitions in 1956. In 1959 he exhibited in a major abstract Impressionism exhibition along with Nicolas de Staël, Sam Francis, Peter Lanyon, Patrick Heron, Bernard Cohen, André Masson and Helen Frankenthaler. He was in Rowland & Delbance Group Shows 1956-58 and Fulham Gallery in 1968. He also had a joint show with Bridget Riley, David Hockney and Eduardo Paolozzi at the London Art Gallery in Queanbeyan Australia in 1969.

== Design ==
Daniels and Tom Adams started Danad Design. It originated in 1958 with Adams Design Associates, formed by Tom Adams and his architect brother Peter, with two friends. Danad became the name in 1960.

Danad was a collective formed with other artists: Peter Blake, Bernard Cohen, Robyn Denny and Edward Wright. Involved too were Peter Adams and another architect Colin Huntley. It was also a commune, consisting of six families living at Marden Hill, a country house in Hertfordshire.

The group had one major exhibition in the Portal Gallery in November 1960. Danad Design furniture was sold exclusively through London outlets Liberty's, Heals and Harrods.

Toward the end of the 1960s Barry Daniels started designing textiles for the likes of Mary Quant, Biba and Liberties and set up the Barry Daniels Studio. As well as selling his own designs he became an agent for designers from the 70's, 80's and 90's, selling globally but mostly in New York. Some of his designs are in the Cooper Hewitt collection in the Smithsonian Museum.
