= Florence Lockwood =

British suffragist

Florence Elizabeth Lockwood
- Born: Florence Elizabeth Murray; 21 October 1861; Devonport, Devon, UK
- Died: 27 March 1937 (aged 75); London, UK
- Education: Slade School of Fine Art
- Spouse: Josiah Lockwood (married 1902-1924)

Florence Elizabeth Lockwood (1861-1937) was an English suffragist and political activist who was mainly active in West Yorkshire, United Kingdom.

== Early life ==
Lockwood was born in 1861 in Devonport, Devon. She spent most of her childhood in Portsmouth, living with her parents and five siblings. Her father was a naval doctor and she had a comfortable middle-class upbringing. In 1887, Lockwood moved to London to study at the prestigious Slade Art School. She then spent several years travelling in Europe, before returning to live alone in London, to make a modest career as an artist.

== Personal life ==
In 1902, Lockwood married Josiah Lockwood, a woollen manufacturer, and moved to Black Rock House in Linthwaite, a village in the Colne Valley, in the West Riding of Yorkshire. The couple never had any children.

== Campaigning for women's suffrage ==
Lockwood first became involved in public political work in around 1907, and for the next fifteen years she was a significant figure in local politics. She was originally converted to the suffrage cause after hearing Emmeline Pankhurst of the Women's Social and Political Union (WSPU) speak at the 1907 Colne Valley by-election. Lockwood served on the executives of the Huddersfield Branch of the National Union of Women's Suffrage Societies (NUWSS), and the Huddersfield branch of its successor organisation, the National Union of Societies for Equal Citizenship (NUSEC). Her suffrage activism included writing pamphlets, writing letters to local newspapers, attending and speaking at meetings, distributing leaflets on walking tours, and personally persuading other women to take up the cause. In 1913, she attended the International Woman Suffrage Alliance congress in Budapest.

== Other political activities ==
Lockwood was also involved in local politics more broadly. She was President of Colne Valley Women's Liberal Association and served on the Huddersfield Liberal Executive. She was also President of Linthwaite District Nursing Association and worked as a Poor Law Guardian. During the First World War, her beliefs changed, and she became an ardent pacifist, rejected liberalism, and converted to socialism. She attended Women's Peace Crusade and Women's International League meetings and was on the executive of the Huddersfield branch of the Union of Democratic Control. She had retired from political work by around 1921.

== Art ==
Lockwood retained her gift for sketching and painting throughout her life. She was vice-president of Huddersfield Art Society and exhibited her work locally. Using her artistic talents, she designed and embroidered the NUWSS branch's 'Votes for Women' suffrage banner which depicted the Colne Valley. The banner was completed in 1911 and is now held in Huddersfield's Tolson Museum.

== Later life ==
When her husband Josiah Lockwood died in 1924 she moved to London. She died in London in 1937.

== Written works ==
Florence Lockwood kept a diary throughout her whole life, and the diaries for 1914-1920 survive. Both her unpublished and published works are held at West Yorkshire Archives and Leeds University Archives.

Her published works include:

- F. Lockwood, Printed Diary Extracts (privately printed for small circulation, 1921).
- F. Lockwood, The Enfranchisement of Women (Slaithwaite, undated).
- F. Lockwood, An Ordinary Life, 1861-1924 (Loughborough, 1932).
