= King's College School =

Private school in Wimbledon, Greater London,

Coordinates: 51°25′18″N 0°13′32″W

King's College School, Wimbledon

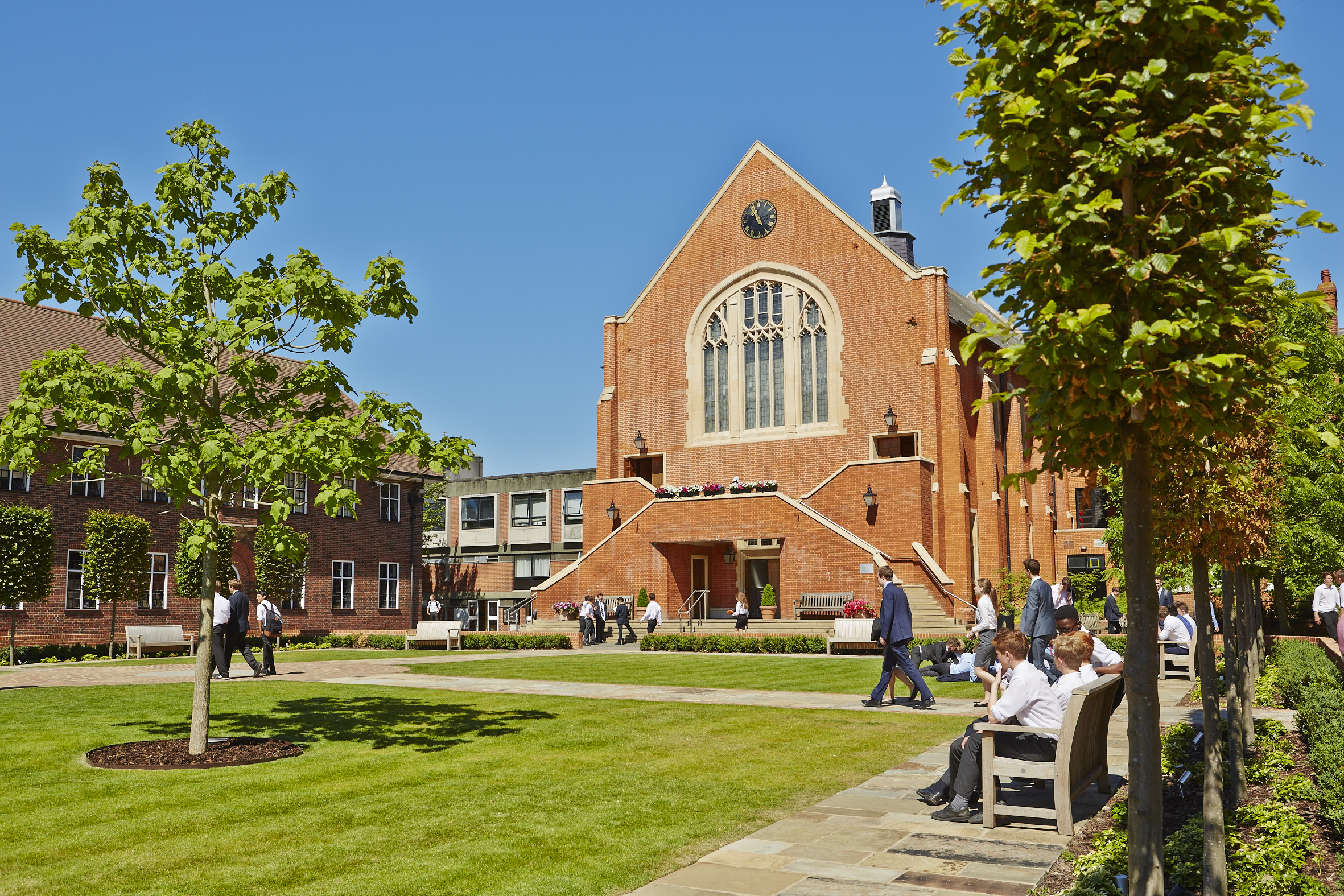
- Wimbledon Common, London, SW19 4TT; United Kingdom

Information
- Type: Private day school
- Motto: Sancte Et Sapienter (Latin: With holiness and wisdom)
- Religious affiliation: Church of England
- Established: 1829
- Founder: King George IV
- Local authority: London Borough of Merton
- Department for Education URN: 102684 Tables
- Chairman of governors: Paul Deighton, Baron Deighton
- Head: Dr. Anne Cotton
- Visitor: The Archbishop of Canterbury ex officio
- Gender: Boys; Coeducational (sixth form)
- Age: 7 to 18
- Enrolment: ~1200 Senior School; ~300 Junior School
- Houses: Alverstone; Glenesk; Kingsley; Layton; Maclear; Major; McKissack; Roberts
- Colours: Blue and red
- Alumni: Old Kings
- Website: www.kcs.org.uk

King's College School, also known as Wimbledon, KCS, King's and KCS Wimbledon, is a private school in Wimbledon, southwest London, England. The school was established in 1829 by King George IV, as the junior department of King's College London and had part of the college’s premises in the basement of the college's Strand campus, prior to relocating to Wimbledon in 1897.

KCS is a member of the Eton Group of schools. It is predominantly a boys' school but accepts girls into the Sixth Form. Girls are progressively being introduced at younger ages, an arrangement to be completed in 2037. In the Sixth Form, students can choose between the International Baccalaureate and A-Level qualifications.

The school is included in The Schools Index as one of the 150 best private schools in the world and among the top 30 senior schools in the UK.

== History ==
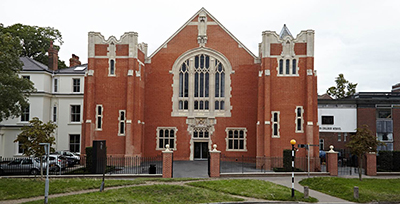
Banister Fletcher Great Hall, 1897

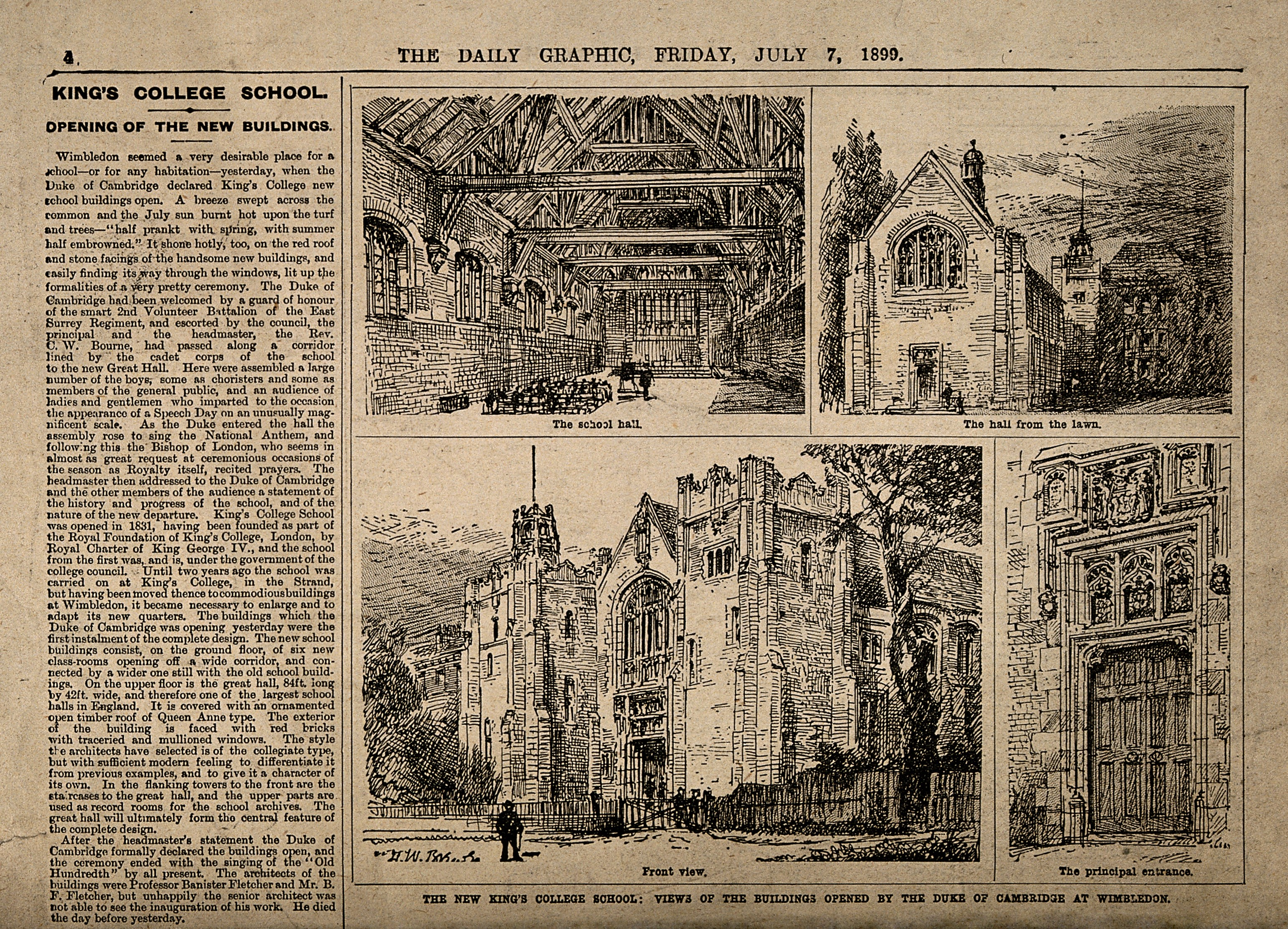
Opening of the New Buildings, 7 July 1899; four sketches of the Great Hall

A royal charter by King George IV founded the school in 1829 as the junior department of the newly established King's College, London. The school occupied the basement of the college in The Strand. Most of its original eighty-five pupils lived in the city within walking distance of the school. During the early Victorian Era, members of the teaching staff included Gabriele Rossetti, who taught Italian. His son, Dante Gabriel, joined the school in 1837. The best known of the early masters was the water-colourist, John Sell Cotman. Nine of his pupils became practising artists and ten architects. By 1843 there were five hundred pupils and the need for larger premises eventually led to the move to Wimbledon in 1897.

The school was progressive in its curriculum in many areas and appointed its first science master in 1855, at a time when very few schools taught science. The first head, John Richardson Major, served the school 1831–1866. 99 of the school's pupils from this period appear in the Dictionary of National Biography. In 1882, only Eton College surpassed the total of thirty Oxford and Cambridge Board examination certificates obtained by pupils at KCS. In 1897, falling numbers of pupils prompted the move to the school's present site in Wimbledon, a suburb served by the railway lines from Surrey and south London. A separate junior school was opened on the same campus in 1912.

During World War I, many letters were written to the school, including some from the Battle of the Somme. During World War II, the school's Great Hall was damaged by bomb shrapnel, and some of the damage can still be seen on the outside of the hall.

The only remaining link between KCS and its former parent is that one of the KCS board of governors is nominated by King's College London.

== Academics ==
All members of the Sixth Form currently study either the IB Diploma or the A-Level course, and all members of the Fifth Form take GCSE and iGCSE qualifications. Due to the impact of the COVID-19 pandemic results were not published during the 2019–2020 or 2020–2021 academic years.

GCSE summary: 2018–2024

Year	%A*/98	%A*A/987	%A*AB/9876
2024	90.7	98.3	99.8
2023	89.8	98.1	99.9
2022	90.9	97.7	99.6
2019	82.8	96.3	99.5
2018	81.7	96.4	99.5

A level summary: 2018–2024

Year	%A*	%A*A	%A*AB
2024	49.5	86.1	96.8
2023	50.09	82.78	93.57
2022	68.1	94.2	99.2
2019	46.5	79.9	94.9
2018	45.6	78.6	95.0

International Baccalaureate Results: 2018–2024

Year	%7	%7/6	%7/6/5
2024	61.8	89.7	98.8
2023	63.8	90.6	99.4
2022	72.1	99.0	99.5
2019	56.0	93.8	98.7
2018	60.7	94.1	99.6

== Facilities ==
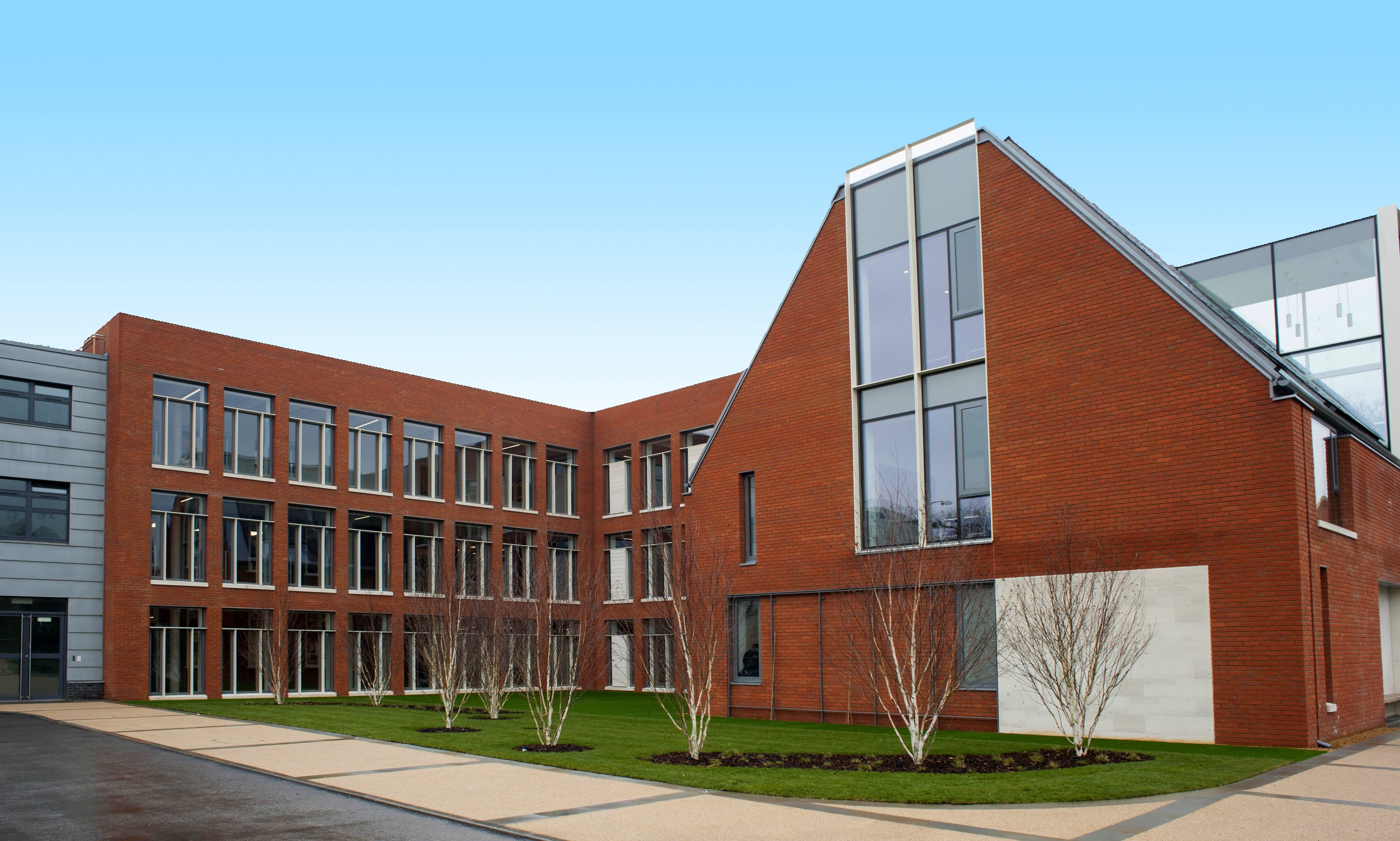
The 2016 classroom block

KCS occupies a 20-acre site on the south side of Wimbledon Common and owns a boathouse on Putney Embankment and two additional playing-fields in Raynes Park and Motspur Park.

In 2010 the school began to renovate and expand its facilities, which was completed in 2019. This included a new sports pavilion (2011), quadrangle and netball court (2015), classroom block (2016), music school (2018), and sports centre (2019).

== King's College Junior School ==
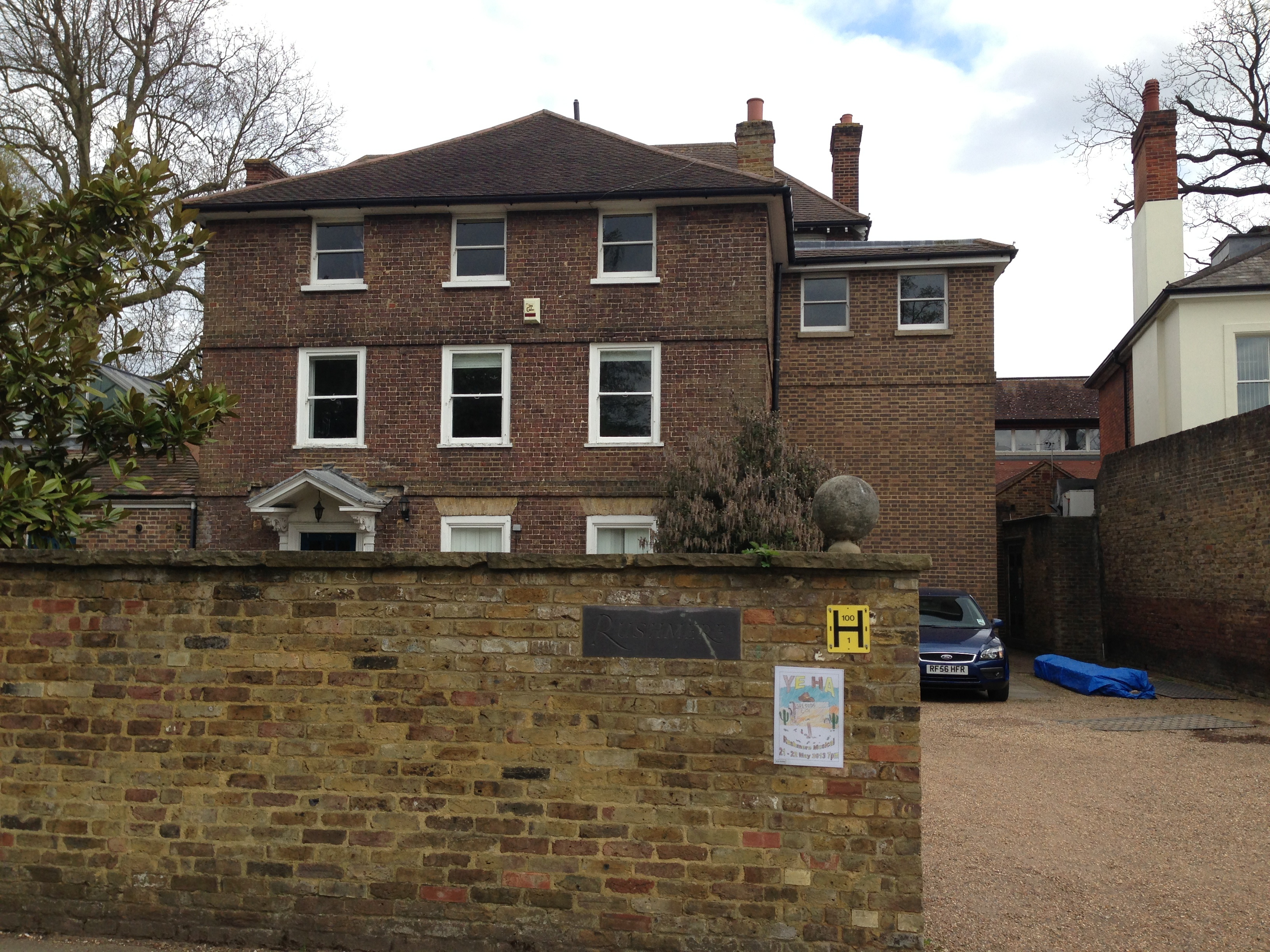
Rushmere House

King's College Junior School (also known as KCJS), is the preparatory school for King's College School located in Wimbledon, London, it is on the same campus as King's College Senior school. It was established in its own right in 1912, and educates boys from ages 7–11.

The junior school admits about 85 boys each year in three groups:

- At 7+ it takes about 54 boys.
- At 8+ it takes about 14 boys.
- At 9+ it takes about 12 boys.

The first two years (3–4) are collectively referred to as 'Rushmere' (as they are taught in Rushmere House), while the final two years (5-6), are called 'Priory'. 2021/2022 fees are £6,425 per term for years 3–4, and £6,930 per term for years 5–6.

As of September 2024 the headmaster is Ted Lougher.

== Controversies ==
In 2021 a series of allegations were raised about a culture of misogyny and sexual harassment amongst King's male students. In an open letter to then headmaster Andrew Halls, Ava Vakil called out a 'a deep-rooted culture of misogyny' at the school, labelling King's as a "hotbed of sexual violence," with instances of groping even occurring on school grounds. Further allegations in the letter include catcalling, circulating nude photos of teenage women without their consent, and threatening rape. These allegations were further supported in online, anonymous testimonies alleging even worse behaviour including, but not limited to, rape, on the website Everyone's Invited, where King's was mentioned at least seven times.

In response, the school established an independent panel of experts to review King's policies.

== Overseas expansion ==
King's has supported the Shanghai-based education provider Dipont in establishing schools in China. The first two schools, RDFZ King's College School Hangzhou and Nanwai King's College School Wuxi, opened in September 2018. Both schools cater for local Chinese and international students aged 3–18.

King's College International School Bangkok opened in September 2020 to over 300 boys and girls aged 2–10. In August 2023, the school opened for over 1,600 students, including its first Sixth Form pupils. In August 2024, its seventh opened. At capacity, the school will cater to roughly 2,400 students from preschool to Year 13. XET will operate the school and King's Wimbledon.

Founded in 1994, the International School of Monaco (ISM) is a co-educational school with approximately 670 students aged 3–18. There is a bilingual programme for English and French in its early years and primary school. In the senior school the medium of instruction is English, offering IGCSEs in years 10 and 11 and the IB Diploma programme in the sixth form.

== Heads of King's College School ==
Dr. Anne Cotton, a former headmistress of Portsmouth Grammar School, has been the head of King's College School since September 2022. The following have been heads of King's College School:

Name	Years as head
John Richardson Major	1831–1866
George Maclear	1866–1880
T. H. Stokoe	1880–1889
Charles Bourne	1889–1906
Douglas Smith	1906–1910
Herbert Lionel Rogers	1910–1934
Hubert John Dixon	1934–1960
Frank Shaw	1960–1975
Christopher Wightwick	1975–1980
Robin Reeve	1980–1997
Tony Evans	1997–2008
Andrew Halls	2008–2021
Jude F Lowson (Acting)	2021–2022
Anne Cotton	2022–

== Other notable masters ==
- J.S. Cotman (1782–1842), art master
- G.P.G. Rossetti (1783–1854), Italian master
- M.E. Cotman (1810–1858), assistant art master
- A.J. Fletcher (1941–), history master
- R. Hiller (1942–), mathematics master (1976–2002)
- G.P. Butcher (1975–), cricket master (2003–2022)
- Bill Waugh (1973–), hockey master (1996–2002)

== Notable alumni ==
=== 19th-century births ===
- Edward Arber (1836–1912), scholar, writer and editor
- Marcus Beresford (1818–1890), Conservative Party politician and Colonel in the 7th Surrey Rifle Volunteers
- J. D. Casswell, QC (1886–1963), barrister
- Sir Monier Monier-Williams (1819–1899), oriental scholar
- George Devey (1820–1886), architect
- Arthur Cayley (1821–1895), mathematician
- William Ince (1825–1910), Regius Professor of Divinity in the University of Oxford
- Jacob Wrey Mould (1825–1886), architect, renowned for designing Central Park
- Alfred Barry (1826–1910), Anglican Archbishop of Sydney
- William Burges (1827–1881), Victorian art-architect
- George William Kitchin (1827–1912), theologian and the first Chancellor of the University of Durham
- Dante Gabriel Rossetti (1828–1882), Pre-Raphaelite painter
- Edward Dutton Cook (1829–1883), dramatic critic and author
- Henry Parry Liddon (1829–1890), theologian
- Algernon Borthwick, 1st Baron Glenesk (1830–1908), journalist and Conservative Party politician
- Charles Harbord, 5th Baron Suffield (1830–1914), Liberal Party peer and Master of the Buckhounds
- Henry Kingsley (1830–1876), novelist
- Frederic Harrison (1831–1923), jurist and historian
- Henry Jones (1831–1899), writer and authority on tennis and card games, instrumental in establishing the Wimbledon Tennis Championships
- Henry Fawcett (1833–1884), British economist, statesman, academic and campaigner for women's suffrage.
- Felix Stone Moscheles (1833–1917), painter, peace activist and advocate of Esperanto
- Sabine Baring-Gould (1834–1924), Hagiographer, antiquarian and hymn writer, the best known of which is Onward, Christian Soldiers
- William Henry Preece (1834–1913), electrical engineer
- William Grantham (1835–1911), Conservative Party politician and High Court Judge
- Walter William Skeat (1835–1912), philologist
- Charles Dickens Jr. (1837–1896), geographic dictionary compiler, and son of the author Charles Dickens
- John Festing (1837–1902), Bishop of St. Albans
- Sidney Godolphin Alexander Shippard (1838–1902), British colonial administrator
- Edward Robert Festing (1839–1912), Army officer and first Director of The Science Museum
- Ingram Bywater (1840–1914), classical scholar
- Alfred de Rothschild (1842–1918), Director of the Bank of England
- Richard Webster, 1st Viscount Alverstone (1842–1915), Attorney-General, barrister and Conservative Party politician
- William Turner Thiselton-Dyer (1843–1928), director of the Royal Botanic Gardens
- William P. Treloar (1843–1923), Lord Mayor of London
- William Christie (1845–1922), Astronomer Royal
- Leopold de Rothschild (1845–1917), banker and thoroughbred race horse breeder
- George Saintsbury (1845–1933), writer and critic
- Henry Sweet (1845–1912), philologist
- Henry Kemble (1848–1907), actor and member of the famed Kemble family
- John Milne (1849–1913), geologist and mining engineer
- James Drake (1850–1941), Australian politician
- Frederic Henry Chase (1853–1925), academic and Bishop of Ely
- Alfred Milner, 1st Viscount Milner (1854–1925), Liberal Party statesman and colonial administrator
- Gordon Smith (1856–1905), barrister and philatelist
- Andrew Watson (1856–1921), the world's first black association football player to play at international level and Captained Scotland to a 6-1 victory against England.
- Sidney Low (1857–1932), journalist and historian
- Richard Kendall-Norris (1859–1921), Conservative Party politician and businessman
- Sir Jeremiah Colman, 1st Baronet (1859–1942), industrialist, Chairman of Colman's Mustard
- Walter Sickert (1860–1942), English Impressionist painter, suspected of being Jack the Ripper
- James Edward Edmonds (1861–1956), official British historian of World War I
- Reginald McKenna (1863–1943), Home Secretary and Chancellor of the Exchequer
- John Martin-Harvey (1863–1944), actor
- George Hillyard (1864–1943), tennis player, Olympic gold medallist, Middlesex cricketer and naval officer
- Charles Sanford Terry (1864–1936), historian and musicologist
- Ernest Starling (1866–1927), physiologist, discovered hormones, developed the 'law of the heart', and involved in the Brown Dog Affair
- Rowland Blades, 1st Baron Ebbisham (1868–1953), Conservative Party politician and Lord Mayor of London
- Lynwood Palmer (1868–1941), painter of racehorses and carriage horses.
- Skinner Turner (1868–1935), Chief Judge of the British Supreme Court for China
- George Holt Thomas (1869–1929), aviation pioneer and founder of Imperial Airways
- Percy Newberry (1869–1949), Egyptologist, introduced Howard Carter to Egypt, and served on staff Tutankhamun excavations
- Frederick Field (Royal Navy officer), (1871–1945), First Sea Lord
- Henry Poole (1873–1928), sculptor
- Ellis Martin (1881–1977), map cover illustrator for Ordnance Survey
- John Barrymore (1882–1942), actor and member of the famed Barrymore family
- Walter Layton, 1st Baron Layton (1884–1966), statesman and editor
- Gilbert Szlumper (1884–1969), general manager of the Southern Railway
- Henry Monck-Mason Moore (1887–1964), British governor of Sierra Leone, Kenya and Ceylon
- Victor Negus (1887–1974), laryngologist, surgeon and comparative anatomist
- Frederick Sowrey (1893–1968), World War I flying ace
- Richard Walther Darré (1895–1953), Nazi ideologist and long-serving Reich Minister of Food and Agriculture
- Robert Graves (1895–1985), poet and novelist, who mentions his brief spell at the school in his autobiography Goodbye to All That
- John G. Bennett (1897–1974), mathematician, scientist, technologist, industrial research director, and author
- Edwin Flavell (1898–1993), military commander

=== 20th-century births ===
- Khalid Abdalla (1980–), actor and star of United 93, The Kite Runner and Green Zone
- Leonard Addison (1902–1975), British Indian Army officer
- Angus Allan (1936–2007), comic strip writer
- Clive Aslet (1955–), writer and former editor of Country Life
- Robert Ayling (1946–), former CEO of British Airways
- Ben Barnes (1981–), actor and star of The Chronicles of Narnia: Prince Caspian and Stardust
- Tom Basden (1981–), comedian
- Stuart Beake (1949–), former Archdeacon of Surrey
- Arthur Bell (1900–1970), paediatrician
- James Binney (1950–), astrophysicist
- Andrew Black (1963–), founder of Betfair, an internet betting exchange
- Sir Cyril Black (1902–1991), MP and financier
- Sir James Bottomley (1920–2013), diplomat
- Tom Browne (1945–), broadcaster and actor
- Raymond Buckland (1934–2017), author
- Roger Casale (1960–), MP for Wimbledon
- Christopher Challis (1919–2012), cinematographer
- Sir Neil Chalmers (1942–), former director of the Natural History Museum
- John Cloake (1924–2014), former ambassador of the United Kingdom to Bulgaria
- Sam Coates (1978–), journalist
- Sir Ralph Cusack (1916–1978), High Court judge
- Sir John Vivian Dacie (1912–2005), haematologist
- Nick D'Aloisio (1995–), entrepreneur and youngest person to have raised VC funding in the world
- Guy de la Bédoyère (1957–), writer and broadcaster
- Nigel Don (1954–), SNP MSP for Angus North and Mearns
- Jimmy Edwards (1920–1988), 1950s British radio and television comedy actor
- George S. J. Faber (1959–), television producer
- Ed Gamble (1986–), comedian
- Sir Victor Goodhew (1919–2006), politician, Conservative MP for St Albans
- Anthony Gordon FMedSci (1969–), clinician scientist
- Nigel Green (1924–1972), actor
- Conal Gregory (1947–), politician, MP for York
- Cifford Hall (1904–1973), painter
- David Halsey (1919–2009), former bishop of Carlisle
- Frank Robinson Hartley (1942–), chemist, vice-chancellor Cranfield University 1989–2006
- Rupert Hine (1947–2020), musician, former chairman of The Ivor Novello Awards
- Robin Holloway (1943–), composer
- Peter Horrocks (1959–), former director of BBC World Service
- David Hughes (1930–2005), novelist
- Ross Hutchins (1985–), professional tennis player
- Robert Jay (1959–), Counsel to the Leveson Inquiry (2011–2012), and now High Court Judge
- William Joyce (1906–1946), Nazi propagandist (as "Lord Haw-Haw"), and fascist politician
- Alvar Lidell (1908–1981), BBC radio announcer
- Roger Lockyer (1927–2017), historian
- Ben Lovett (1987–), musician and member of the band Mumford and Sons
- Mark Lowen (1982–), BBC news correspondent
- John McLeod (1949–), card game researcher
- James Mitchell (1989–), professional poker player, took part in the Irish Poker Open.
- Jonathan Montgomery (1962–), British legal scholar who specialises in health care law.
- Peter G. Moore (1928–2010), British soldier, actuary, academic and statistician
- Simon Conway Morris FRS (1951–), evolutionary palaeobiologist
- Buster Mottram (1955–), professional tennis player, who achieved a highest world ranking of fifteenth.
- Marcus Mumford (1987–), musician and founder of the band Mumford and Sons
- Andrew Hunter Murray (1987–), QI, Austentatious
- David Nokes (1948–2009), literary scholar and biographer
- Dudley Owen-Thomas (1948–), lawyer and former first-class cricketer
- Richard Pasco (1926–2014), stage, screen and TV actor
- Roy Plomley (1914–1985), broadcaster and creator of the BBC radio programme Desert Island Discs
- Andrew Powell (1949–), musician
- Gaby Rado (1955–2003), television journalist
- Sir Stephen Richards (1950–), Appeal Court judge
- Prince Alexander Romanov (1929–2002), great nephew of the last Russian Emperor, Nicholas II
- Joe Salisbury (1992–), professional tennis player
- Ronald A. Sandison (1916–2010), psychiatrist, pioneered the clinical use of LSD in the UK.
- Michael Scott (1981–), classicist, author and broadcaster
- David Shaw (1950–2022), politician, MP for Dover
- Dan Smith (1986–), lead singer of indie band Bastille
- Brian Spalding (1923-2016), professor of engineering
- Andrew Stuart (1962–), mathematician
- Joby Talbot (1971–), composer
- Simon Treves (1957–), actor and writer
- Mark Urban (1961–), journalist, author & Diplomatic Editor of BBC's Newsnight programme
- Stuart Urban (1959–), film and television director
- Chris van Tulleken (1978–), Doctor and TV presenter including CBBC series Operation Ouch!
- Xand van Tulleken (1978–), Doctor and TV presenter including CBBC series Operation Ouch!
- Donald Walker (1912–1941), first-class cricketer
- Patrick Wolf, né Patrick Apps (1983–), singer-songwriter
- Nadhim Zahawi (1967–), MP for Stratford-on-Avon

=== 21st-century births ===
- Arthur Fery (2002–), professional tennis player

=== Victoria Cross holders ===
Five Old King's have been awarded the Victoria Cross.

- Mark Sever Bell, Ashanti War, awarded the Victoria Cross
- William George Cubitt, Indian Mutiny, awarded the Victoria Cross
- Philip Salkeld, Indian Mutiny, awarded the Victoria Cross
- Arthur Scarf, World War II, awarded the Victoria Cross
- Robert Haydon Shebbeare, Indian Mutiny, awarded the Victoria Cross

== Notable governors ==
- Sir Trevor McDonald, journalist and newsreader

== Alumni associations ==
The principal society for former pupils of the school is the Old King's Club, founded in 1884. The school promotes membership amongst recently departed pupils, for whom membership of the club is free.

A number of alumni also join the East India Club, formerly the Public Schools Club, on discounted membership.

King's College School Lodge number 4257 is the masonic lodge associated with King's College School. It is governed by the United Grand Lodge of England and administered by the Metropolitan Grand Lodge. Meetings are held four times per year at the school. The Warrant of the Lodge was issued on 23 February 1921 and it was consecrated at Freemasons' Hall, London, on 3 May 1921.

== See also ==
- KCS Old Boys RFC
- King's College School Boat Club
- List of independent schools in England
