= Slade School of Fine Art =

Art school of University College London, England

UCL Slade School of Fine Art
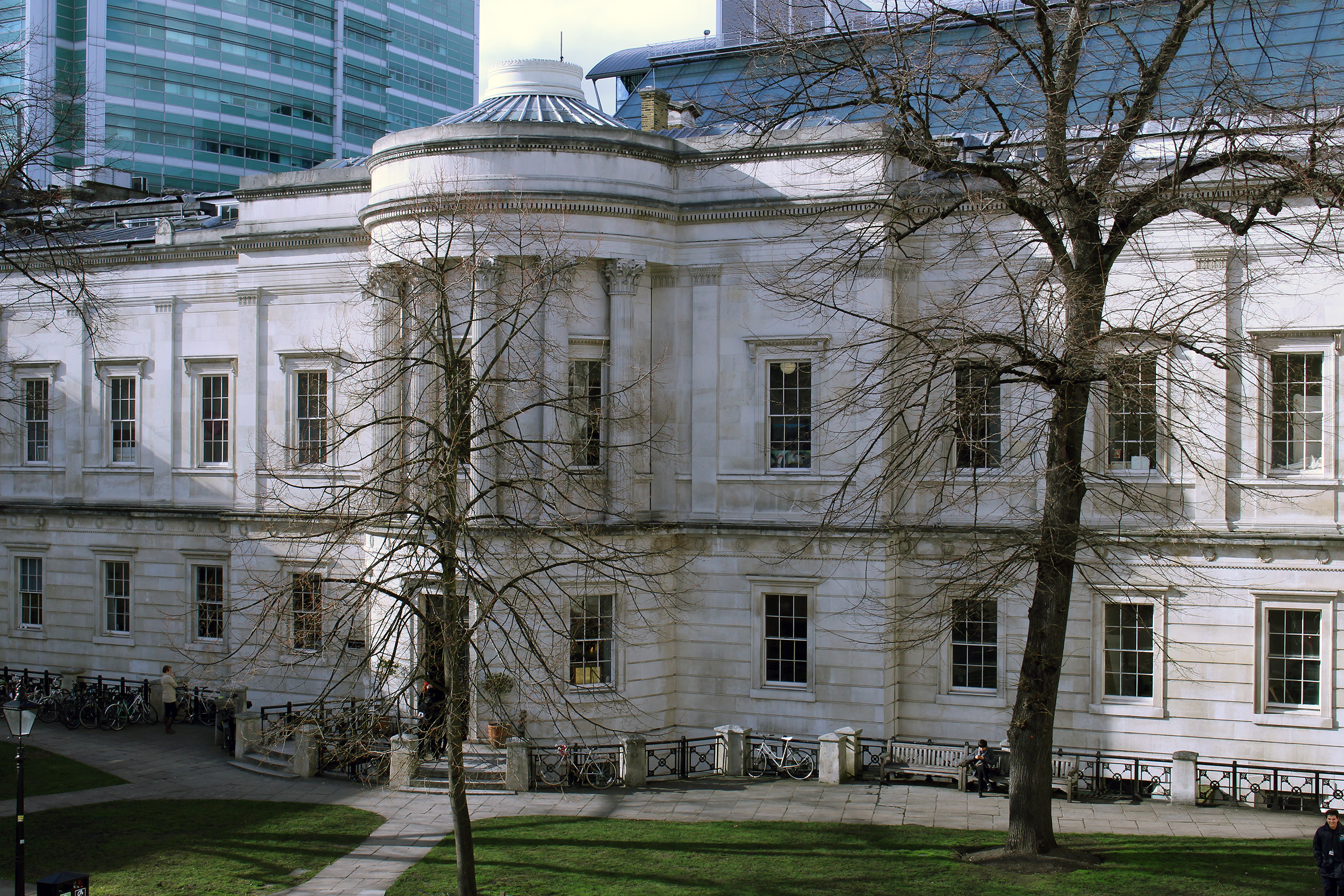
- The North Wing of the UCL Wilkins Building in March 2015
- Type: Art school
- Established: 1871; 155 years ago
- Founder: Felix Slade
- Parent institution: University College London
- Director: Mary Evans
- Administrative staff: 72
- Students: 330
- Location: Bloomsbury, London, England, United Kingdom; 51°31′30″N 00°08′04″W
- Campus: Urban
- Website: ucl.ac.uk/slade/

The UCL Slade School of Fine Art (informally The Slade) is the art school of University College London (UCL) and is based in London, England. It has been ranked as the UK's top art and design educational institution. The school is organised as a department of UCL's Faculty of Arts and Humanities.

== History ==
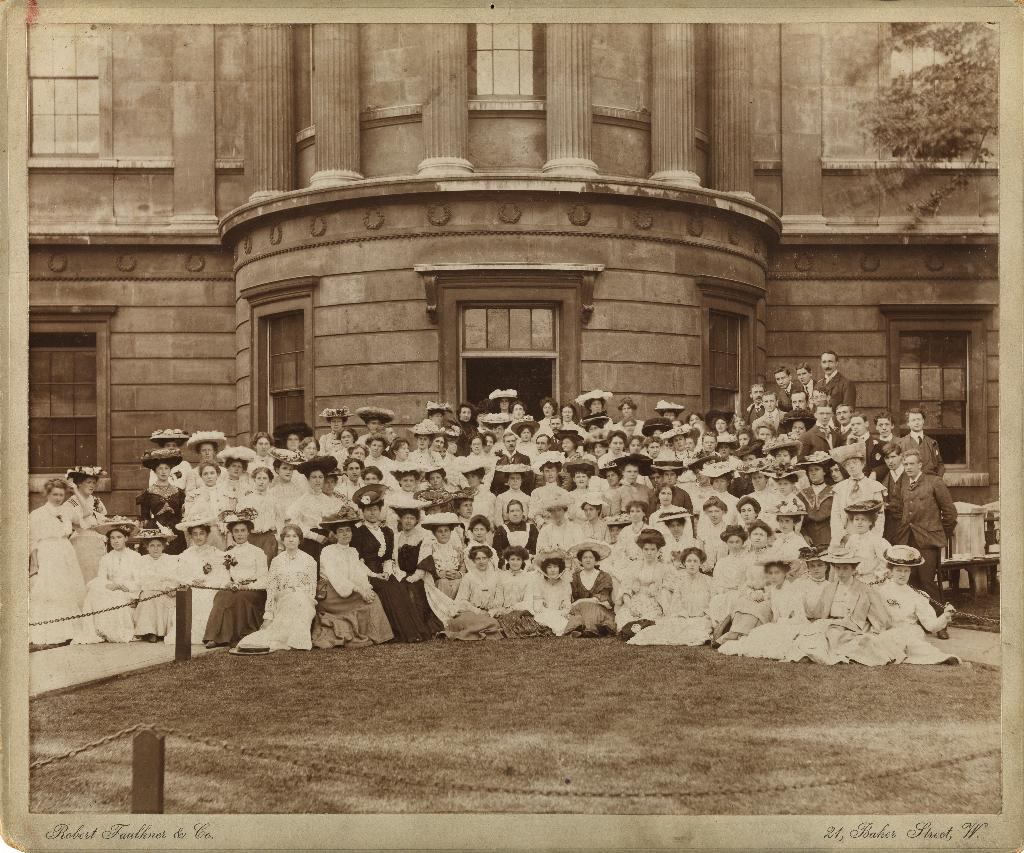
Students at the Slade in 1905

The school was founded in University College on 2 October 1871 following an endowment from the will of the lawyer and philanthropist Felix Slade (1788–1868) who bequeathed £35,000 to establish three Chairs in Fine Art, to be based at Oxford University, Cambridge University and University College London. An additional six scholarships of £50 per annum were endowed to University College. The college itself provided £5000 to build the Slade School as part of the college quadrangle in Gower Street, premises which the School still occupies today.

Distinguished past teachers include Henry Tonks, Wilson Steer, Randolph Schwabe, William Coldstream, Andrew Forge, Lucian Freud, John Hilliard, Bruce McLean, Alfred Gerrard and Phyllida Barlow. Edward Allington was Professor of Fine Art and Head of Graduate Sculpture until his death in 2017.

Two of its most important periods were immediately before, and immediately after, the turn of the twentieth century, described by Henry Tonks as its two 'crises of brilliance'. The first included the students Augustus John, William Orpen and Percy Wyndham Lewis; the second – which has been chronicled in David Boyd Haycock's A Crisis of Brilliance: Five Young British Artists and the Great War – included the students Dora Carrington, Mark Gertler, Paul Nash, C.R.W. Nevinson and Stanley Spencer.

Another notable period followed the Second World War, under the directorship of William Coldstream, who brought in Lucian Freud to teach, and whose students included Paula Rego, Michael Andrews and the filmmaker Lorenza Mazzetti. Coldstream was responsible for the creation of the Slade Film Department, the first in any British university, in 1960, with Thorold Dickinson as chief lecturer. Filmmakers associated with the Slade Film Department include Derek Jarman and Peter Whitehead.

== Slade Centre for Electronic Media in Fine Art ==
The Slade Centre for Electronic Media in Fine Art (SCEMFA) was opened in 1995. The centre provides opportunities for research into electronic media and fine art with the goal of contributing to debate on national and international levels. The Slade had previously been home to Malcolm Hughes's Computer and Experimental Department in the 1970s.

In 1997 SCEMFA presented Collision, a public lecture series by artists, writers, and curators working with interactivity, telematics, and digital works. This exhibition was followed by Spontaneous Reaction, a week-long seminar funded by the Arts Council of England, which took a critical look at interactivity with participants from a variety of disciplines, including psychology, architecture, and computer science.

Throughout 1998, SCEMFA collaborated with Channel 4 UK to organise Cached, a monthly event held at the Institute of Contemporary Arts, London. Funded by the Arts Council, this series investigated the conceptual and practical issues of producing art for the internet through a series of artists presentations.

== Art collection ==
The Slade art collection was started when the yearly prizes awarded to top students was combined with a collection scheme in 1897 and the Summer Composition Prize and the Figure and Head Painting Prizes began to be kept by the school. Works by students and staff of the Slade School of Fine Art form the basis of the UCL Art museum today.

== Rankings ==
In a 2008 survey conducted by The Sunday Times the Slade recorded perfect scores.

Faculty rankings
	2010
The Guardian University Guide	1st
The Complete University Guide	2nd
The Times Good University Guide	2nd

== Teaching ==
The faculty currently offers the following programs:

Undergraduate studies

- 3-year BFA in Fine Art
- 4-year BA in Fine Art

Graduate studies

- 2-academic year (18 months) MFA in Fine Art
- 2-calendar (24 months) MA in Fine Art
- 1-term, 2-term, of 1-year Graduate Affiliate Study

Research

- MPhil or PhD in Fine Art

== Notable alumni ==
Full list see Category:Alumni of the Slade School of Fine Art

- Elinor Proby Adams (1885–1945), painter
- Mary Adshead (1904–1995), mural painter, designer
- Anna Airy (1882–1964), artist
- Rosemary Allan (1911–2008), painter
- Kathleen Allen (1906–1983), painter
- Edward Allington (1951–2017), sculptor
- Michael Andrews (1928–1995), painter
- Irene Aronson (1918–1992), painter and printmaker
- Sue Arrowsmith (1950–2014), photographic artist
- Ed Atkins (born 1982), artist
- Ray Atkins (born 1937), painter
- Joan Ayling (1907–1993), painter
- Zainul Abedin (1914–1976), painter
- Ethelwyn Baker (1899–1988), sculptor
- Phyllis Barron (1890–1964), textile designer
- Alvaro Barrington (born 1983), artist
- James Bateman (1893–1959), painter
- Amelia Bauerle (1873–1916), painter and illustrator
- Pauline Baynes (1922–2008), illustrator
- Tessa Beaver (1932–2018), painter and illustrator
- Roy Beddington (1910–1995), painter, illustrator, and writer
- Elinor Bellingham-Smith (1906–1988), painter
- Eleanor Best (1875–1957), painter
- Zelma Blakely (1921–1978), illustrator
- David Bomberg (1890–1957), painter
- Dorothy Elizabeth Bradford (1897–1986), painter
- Phyllis Bray (1911–1991), painter and muralist
- Raymond Briggs (born 1934), illustrator, graphic novelist
- Cecily Brown (born 1969), painter
- Sheila Bownas (1925–2007), textile designer and botanical illustrator
- Felicia Browne (1904–1936), painter and Spanish Civil War volunteer
- Rodney Joseph Burn (1899–1984), painter
- Dorothy Burroughes (1883–1963), illustrator
- William Bustard (1894–1973), stained glass artist
- Dorothy A. Cadman (fl. 1908–1927), painter
- Martin John Callanan (born 1982), artist, current teaching staff
- Gina Calleja (1928 – 2017), author and illustrator
- Nancy Carline (1909–2004), artist
- Sydney Carline (1888–1929), artist
- Thomas Carr (1909–1999), artist
- Ethel Carrick (1872–1951), painter
- Dora Carrington (1893–1932), artist
- Chien-Ying Chang (1913–2004), artist
- Daphne Charlton (1909–1991), painter
- Evan Charlton (1904–1984), painter
- G. K. Chesterton (1874–1936), writer
- Evelyn Cheston (1875–1929), painter
- Spartacus Chetwynd (born 1973), artist, Turner Prize nominee
- Derek Chittock (1922–1986), portrait painter
- Dora Clarke (1895–1989), sculptor
- Edna Clarke Hall (1879–1979), painter
- Dorothy Coke (1897–1979), painter
- Sir William Coldstream (1908–1987), painter
- Professor Paul Coldwell (born 1952), artist
- Ruth Collet (1909–2001), painter
- John Collier (1850–1934), artist
- Marian Collier (1859–1887), painter
- Susan Alexis Collins (born 1964), artist, current Slade Director & Professor
- Ithell Colquhoun (1906–1988), painter and writer
- William George Constable (1887–1976), art historian
- Pat Gerrard Cooke (1935–2000), painter and illustrator
- Teresa Copnall (1882–1972), painter
- Frank Barrington Craig (1902–1951), painter and teacher
- Martin Creed (born 1968), artist
- Dennis Creffield (1931–2018), painter
- Barbara Crocker (1910–1995), artist, author
- Claudia Cuesta, artist
- Charles Cundall (1890–1971), painter
- Nora Cundell (1889–1948), painter
- Esmé Currey (1881–1973), painter, etcher
- Barry Daniels (1933–2010), British artist, painter, and designer
- Yitzhak Danziger (1916–1977), sculptor
- Tacita Dean (born 1965),
- Alison Debenham (1903–1967)
- Diarmuid Delargy (born 1958), printer and sculptor
- Evelyn De Morgan (1885–1919)
- Angela Delevingne
- Brigid Derham (1943–1980), painter
- Anthony Devas (1911–1958), portrait painter
- Sir William Dobell (1899–1970), portrait painter
- Barbara Dorf (1933–2016), painter
- Sholto Johnstone Douglas (1871–1958), artist
- Jane Dowling (1925–2023), painter
- William Dring (1904–1990), portrait painter
- William Easton, artist
- Ursula Edgcumbe (1900–1985), sculptor
- Ibrahim El-Salahi (born 1930), painter
- Jake Elwes (born 1993), artist
- Florence Engelbach (1872–1951), painter
- Grace English (1891–1956), painter
- Ben Enwonwu (1921–1994), artist
- Jadé Fadojutimi (born 1993), artist
- Leila Faithfull (1896–1994), painter
- Julia Farrer (born 1950), artist
- Robert Fawcett (1903–1967), illustrator
- Daphne Fedarb (1912–1992), painter
- Paul Feiler (1918–2013), artist
- Elsie Few (1909–1980), artist
- Philip Firsov (born 1985), artist and sculptor
- Myrta Fisher (1917–1999), painter
- Mary Sargant Florence (1857–1954), painter
- Caroline Sylvia Gabriel (1912–1997), artist
- Clive Gardiner (1891–1960), artist, designer and illustrator
- Nicholas Garland (born 1935), political cartoonist
- Raimi Gbadamosi (born 1965), neo-conceptual artist
- Alfred Gerrard (1899–1998), sculptor
- Kaff Gerrard (1894–1970), painter and potter
- Mark Gertler (1891–1939), artist
- A.A. Gill (1954–2016), journalist
- Colin Gill (1892–1940), painter
- Elsie Gledstanes (1893–1972), painter
- Dryden Goodwin (born 1971), artist, current teaching staff
- Douglas Gordon (born 1966), artist
- Antony Gormley (born 1950), sculptor
- Harold Gosney (born 1937), artist and sculptor
- Caroline Gotch (1854–1945), painter
- Carmen Gracia (born 1935), printmaker
- Duncan Grant (1885–1978), painter and designer
- Eileen Gray (1898–1976), designer and architect
- Barbara Greg (1900–1983), wood engraver
- David Griffiths (portrait painter) (Born 1939), portrait painter
- Gwenny Griffiths (1867–1953), portrait painter
- Oona Grimes (born 1957), artist
- Vaughan Grylls (born 1943), artist
- Robin Guthrie (1902–1971), painter
- Kathleen Guthrie (1906–1981), painter
- Edna Guy (1907–1982), marine artist
- Richard Hamilton (1922–2011), painter and collage artist
- Archibald Standish Hartrick (1864–1950), artist and illustrator
- Lucy Harwood (1893–1972), artist
- Mona Hatoum (born 1952), artist
- Mary Headlam(1873-1959), artist
- Francis Helps (1890–1972), artist
- Elsie Henderson (1880–1967), painter and sculptor
- Keith Henderson (1883–1982), artist and illustrator
- Nigel Henderson (1917–1985), artist
- Florence Lockwood (1861–1937), women's suffrage activist
- Lady Mary Lovelace (1848–1941), artist, architect and author
- Patrick Heron (1920–1999), abstract painter
- Cicely Hey (1896–1980), painter and sculptor
- Ian Holbourn (1872–1935), artist, educator, laird of Foula, writer, and RMS Lusitania survivor
- Ruth Hollingsworth (1880–1945), painter
- Annie Horniman (1860–1937), theatre owner and manager
- Nancy Horrocks (1900–1989), abstract artist
- Ray Howard-Jones (1903–1996), artist
- Edgar Hubert (1906–1985), painter
- Georgina Hunt (1922–2012), abstract artist
- Sidney Hunt (1896–1940), artist and designer
- Paul Huson (born 1942), writer and designer
- George Percy Jacomb-Hood (1857–1929), artist
- Darsie Japp (1883–1973), artist
- Derek Jarman (1942–1994), artist and filmmaker
- Augustus John (1878–1961), artist
- Gwen John (1876–1939), artist
- Vivien John (1915–1994), artist
- Arnrid Johnston (1895–1972), sculptor, illustrator
- Alfred Garth Jones (1872–1955), illustrator
- Karin Jonzen (1914–1998), sculptor
- Gerry Judah (born 1951), artist and designer
- Menashe Kadishman (1932–2015), Israeli sculptor and painter
- Helen Kapp (1901–1978), artist and curator
- Dorothy King (1907–1990), painter and curator
- Eve Kirk (1900–1969), painter
- Myfanwy Kitchin (1917–2002), painter, ceramicist
- Robert Koenig (born 1951), sculptor
- Clara Klinghoffer (1900–1970), artist
- Paul Kneale (born 1986), artist
- Winifred Knights (1899–1947), painter
- Kanayi Kunhiraman (born 1937), sculptor
- Sir Osbert Lancaster (1908–1986), cartoonist
- Olga Lehmann (1912–2001), painter, illustrator and designer
- Maxwell Gordon Lightfoot (1886–1911), painter
- Peter Kennard (born 1949), artist
- Bernard Leach (1887–1879), ceramic artist, "Father of British studio pottery"
- Lilian Lancaster (1888–1973), artist and teacher
- Edith Lawrence (1890–1973), artist
- Kim Lim (1937–1997), sculptor
- Zhi Lin, artist
- Henrietta Lister (1895–1959), race driver and watercolourist
- Nicholas Logsdail (born 1945), art dealer
- John Long (1964–2016), painter and teacher
- Lowes Dalbiac Luard (1872–1944), painter
- John Luke (1906–1975), painter and sculptor
- John Lundberg (born 1968), artist and filmmaker
- Sine MacKinnon (1901–1996), painter
- Nicolette Macnamara (1911–1987), artist and author
- John Mansbridge (1901–1981), painter and World War II official war artist
- Constance Markievicz (1868–1927), artist, revolutionary nationalist, suffragette, socialist
- Ellis Martin (1881–1977), map cover illustrator for Ordnance Survey
- John Mascaro (born 1970), artist
- Moina Mathers (1865–1928), artist and occultist
- Mary McEvoy (1870–1941), painter
- Dorothy Mead (1928–1975), painter
- Robert Medley (1905–1994), painter and designer
- Elizabeth Merriman (born 1963), painter
- Oliver Messel (1904–1978), stage designer
- Robert Micklewright (1923–2013), artist and illustrator
- Mother Maribel of Wantage (1887–1970), artist and sculptor
- Daniel Mulloy (born 1977), film writer and director
- Donia Nachshen (1903–1987), illustrator
- Paul Nash (1889–1946), painter
- Gemma Nelson (born 1984), painter
- C. R. W. Nevinson (1889–1946), artist
- Bertha Newcombe (1857–1947), artist and illustrator
- Ben Nicholson (1894–1982), abstract painter
- Philip Norman (1842–1931), artist and antiquarian
- Alanna O'Kelly (born 1955), Irish performance artist
- Madge Oliver (1874–1924), painter
- Sir Eduardo Paolozzi (1924–2005), artist
- Kathleen Parbury (1901–1986), sculptor
- Katie Paterson (born 1981), artist
- Eddie Peake (born 1981), artist
- Margot Perryman (born 1938), painter
- Louise Pickard (1865–1928), painter
- Edward Plunkett, 20th Baron of Dunsany (1939–2011), painter and sculptor
- Mary Potter (1900–1981), painter
- Margaret Fisher Prout (1875–1963), painter
- Sarah Pucill, film artist
- Ethel Pye (1882–1960), sculptor and jewellery designer
- Carl Randall (born 1975), painter
- Paula Rego (1935-2022), painter, illustrator and printmaker
- Harold Riley (born 1934), artist
- Eric Rimmington (1926–2024)
- William Roberts (1895–1980), painter
- Claude Rogers (1907–1979), artist
- Rosemary Rutherford (1912–1972), painter and stained glass artist
- Ethel Jenner Rosenberg (1858–1930), first English Bahá'í
- Isaac Rosenberg (1890–1918), war poet
- Paul Rotha (1907–1984), documentary film-maker, film historian and critic
- James Scott (born 1941), filmmaker and artist
- Melissa Scott-Miller (1959-), painter
- Ina Maud Sheldon-Williams (1876–1956), painter
- Rupert Shephard (1909–1992), artist
- F. H. S. Shepherd (1877–1948), painter
- Edith Simon (1917–2003), artist, sculptor, author
- Marianna Simnett (born 1986), artist
- Veronica Smirnoff (born 1979), painter
- Sir Matthew Smith (1879–1959), painter
- Peter Snow (1927–2008), painter and theatre designer
- Walter Shaw Sparrow (1862–1940), writer
- Yolanda Sonnabend (1935–2015), theatre and ballet designer and painter
- Clodagh Hope Knox Sparrow (1905–1957), poster artist
- Sir Stanley Spencer (1891–1959), artist
- Unity Spencer (1930–2017), artist
- Andrew Stahl (1954-2024), painter
- Leo Steinberg (1920–2011), art historian
- John Stezaker (born 1949), artist
- David Storey (1933–2017), playwright, screenwriter, novelist
- Keith Sutton (1934–2017), artist and critic
- Ernest Heber Thompson (1891–1971), painter and printmaker
- William Tillyer (born 1938), artist
- Arthur Ralph Middleton Todd (1891–1966), portrait painter
- Greta Tomlinson (1927–2021), artist
- Euan Uglow (1932–2000), painter
- David Vaughan (1944–2003), psychedelic artist
- Charlotte Verity (born 1954), painter
- Stelios Votsis (1929–2012), painter
- Edward Wadsworth (1889–1949), artist
- Mary Spencer Watson (1913–2006), sculptor
- Edith Grace Wheatley (1888–1970), painter
- Rex Whistler (1905–1944), painter, designer, and illustrator
- Erica White (1904–1991), sculptor
- Rachel Whiteread (born 1963), artist
- Victor Willing (1928–1988), artist
- Charli XCX (born 1992), singer–songwriter
- Nan Youngman (1906–1995), painter and educationalist
- Partou Zia (1958–2008), painter and writer
- Cecilia Vicuña (born 1948), poet and artist
- Christopher Le Brun (born 1951), artist
- Anupam Sud (born 1944), Indian printmaker

== See also ==
- Art of the United Kingdom
