= Ina Maud Sheldon-Williams =

British artist (1876–1956)

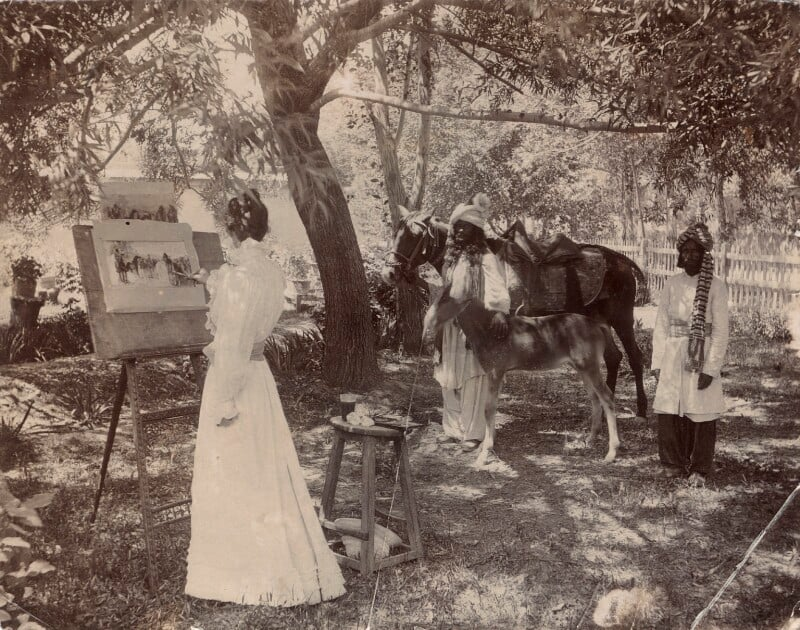
- Sheldon-Williams painting in India, 1902
- Born: Ina Maud Thomson; January 21, 1876; Ardrishaig, Argyll, Scotland
- Died: November 25, 1955 (aged 79)
- Education: Slade School of Fine Art
- Known for: Painting
- Spouse: Inglis Sheldon-Williams (1870–1940)

Ina Maud Sheldon-Williams nee Thomson (1876–1955) was a British artist, known for her travel and landscape paintings.

== Biography ==
Ina Sheldon-Williams was born in Ardrishaig, Argyll, in Scotland. She studied at the Slade School of Fine Art in London from 1895 to 1898 and also studied in Paris. She was widely travelled both throughout her life, in Britain, Italy and India.

Ina Maud Thomson married Inglis Sheldon-Williams (1870-1940) in 1904 and they resided in England for the following decade. Inglis Sheldon-Williams was also an artist and a military figure, who had once studied with Thomas Brock before enrolling at the Slade. He was a war correspondent during the Second Boer War and the 1904 Russo-Japanese War. During the First World War he worked as a war artist for the Canadian forces in France.

In 1926, Sheldon-Williams exhibited a painting of the Italian and French Alps alongside her husband's war drawings at Messrs. W. J. Walter's New Gallery. Sheldon-Williams presented studies of an Indian figure for an exhibition in 1935. Established by Kenneth Clark in the early 1940s, Sheldon-Williams contributed to the Recording Britain scheme during the Second World War. She exhibited paintings on a regular basis in group and solo shows at the Royal Academy in London, with the New English Art Club, the Fine Art Society and at Walker's Galleries, the Kensington Gallery and elsewhere. In July 2012, Sheldon-Williams' work was exhibited alongside work by Elisabeth Frink at Buxton Museum and Art Gallery.

Sheldon-Williams had two daughters, Eve and Christina. Sheldon-Williams' daughter Eve was an artist and lecturer. Her granddaughter, Fran Hickox, is also an artist.

== Works in public collections ==
Ina Sheldon-Williams' work is held in public collections in both the United Kingdom and Canada.

Title	Year	Medium	Gallery no.	Gallery	Location
Cactus Flowers	c.1949–1950	oil on canvas	F2045	Derbyshire & Derby School Library Service	England
Inglis Sheldon-Williams Painting Ina's Portrait	1919	pencil on paper	PC83.1.50	Dunlop Art Gallery	Saskatchewan, Canada
Girl Reading	-	pencil on paper	PC83.1.49	Dunlop Art Gallery	Saskatchewan, Canada
Keats House, Hampstead	ca.1940	pencil and watercolour on paper	E.1860-1949	Victoria and Albert Museum	London, England
Oxen Ploughing, the Cuckmere	c.1904	oil on canvas	HASMG:939.6	Hastings Museum and Art Gallery	Hastings, England
Study for Dog in Mons Picture	-	pencil on paper	PC83.1.51	Dunlop Art Gallery	Saskatchewan, Canada
Sussex Oxen and Hayricks	c.1904	oil on canvas	HASMG:973.107	Hastings Museum and Art Gallery	Hastings, England
