= List of works by Dornford Yates =

Works by Cecil William Mercer

Cecil William Mercer
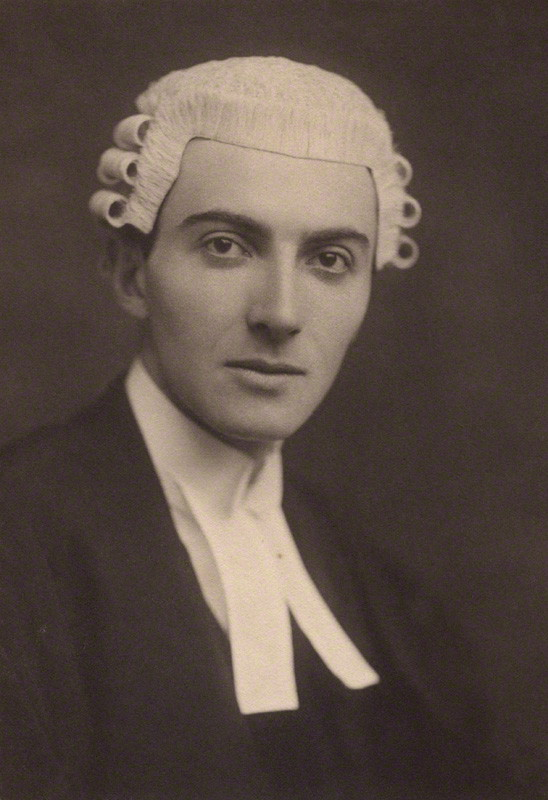
- Cecil William Mercer in 1909
- Born: 7 August 1885; Walmer, Kent
- Died: 5 March 1960 (aged 74); Umtali, Southern Rhodesia
- Education: University College, Oxford
- Occupation: Author
- Writing career
- Pen name: Dornford Yates

Dornford Yates was the pseudonym of the English novelist Cecil William Mercer (7 August 1885 – 5 March 1960), whose novels and short stories – some humorous tales (the 'Berry' books) and some serious thrillers (the 'Chandos' books) – were best-sellers in the period between the First and Second World Wars.

This categorization of Yates's books is based on the list that appears in his last published work, B-Berry and I Look Back. All are full-length novels except where noted. Almost all of the tales in the short story collections were also published separately, often in slightly different form and with different titles in The Windsor Magazine: see the corresponding book article for details.

== 'Berry' books ==
The 'Berry' books are comic novels and short stories narrated in the first person by Boy Pleydell. They feature the family group of Berry Pleydell (Boy's cousin), Daphne Pleydell (Boy's sister and Berry's wife), Jonathan 'Jonah' Mansel (Boy's cousin) and Jill Mansel (Boy's cousin and Jonah's sister).

The 'Berry' books
Title	Year of first publication	First edition publisher	Notes	Ref.
The Brother of Daphne	1914	Ward Lock & Co	Short stories, originally published in The Windsor Magazine	
The Courts of Idleness	1920	Ward Lock & Co	Short stories, originally published in The Windsor Magazine	
Berry and Co.	1921	Ward Lock & Co	Short stories, originally published in The Windsor Magazine	
Jonah and Co.	1922	Ward Lock & Co	Short stories, originally published in The Windsor Magazine	
Adèle and Co.	1931	Hodder and Stoughton	Novel. Prepares for some of the events in Red in the Morning.	
And Berry Came Too	1936	Ward Lock & Co	Short stories, originally published in The Windsor Magazine	
The House That Berry Built	1945	Ward Lock & Co	Novel	
The Berry Scene	1947	Ward Lock & Co	Short stories	
As Berry and I Were Saying	1952	Ward Lock & Co	Fictionalised memoirs	
B-Berry and I Look Back	1958	Ward Lock & Co	Fictionalised memoirs	

== 'Chandos' books ==
The 'Chandos' books are adventure novels narrated in the first person by Richard William Chandos. They often feature Jonathan Mansel (from the 'Berry' books), George Hanbury, and their respective menservants Bell, Carson and Rowley.

The 'Chandos' books
Title	Year of first publication	First edition publisher	Notes	Ref.
Blind Corner	1927	Hodder and Stoughton	Published in abridged form in Short Stories magazine as "The Treasure of the Well".	
Perishable Goods	1928	Hodder and Stoughton	Sequel to Blind Corner. Its writing is satirized in the ‘Berry’ story “Letters Patent” (found in the story collection “Maiden Stakes”).	
Blood Royal	1929	Hodder and Stoughton	Novel, set in the fictional Principality of Riechtenburg.	
Fire Below	1930	Hodder and Stoughton	By Royal Command in the US. Sequel to Blood Royal.	
She Fell Among Thieves	1935	Hodder and Stoughton	Novel. Serialised in Woman's Journal.	
An Eye for a Tooth	1943	Ward Lock & Co	Novel, set immediately after the events of Blind Corner.	
Red in the Morning	1946	Ward Lock & Co	Were Death Denied in the US. Follows on directly from Gale Warning. References events from Adele & Co.	
Cost Price	1949	Ward Lock & Co	The Laughing Bacchante in the US. Sequel to Safe Custody. References events from Blind Corner.	

== Other Volumes ==
Other Volumes
Title	Year of first publication	First edition publisher	Notes	Ref.
Anthony Lyveden	1921	Ward Lock & Co	Originally published in The Windsor Magazine	
Valerie French	1923	Ward Lock & Co	Sequel to Anthony Lyveden. Originally published in The Windsor Magazine	
And Five Were Foolish	1924	Ward Lock & Co	Short stories, originally published in The Windsor Magazine	
As Other Men Are	1925	Ward Lock & Co	Short stories, originally published in The Windsor Magazine	
The Stolen March	1926	Ward Lock & Co	Fantasy novel, originally published in The Windsor Magazine	
Summer Fruit	1929	Minton, Balch & Company, New York	US omnibus edition of Anthony Lyveden and Valerie French	
Maiden Stakes	1929	Ward Lock & Co	Short stories, originally published in The Windsor Magazine. Includes the 'Berry' story Letters Patent, which satirises the creation of the ‘Chandos’ story Perishable Goods	
Safe Custody	1932	Hodder and Stoughton	Serialised in The Saturday Evening Post (as Your Castle of Hohenems)	
Storm Music	1934	Hodder and Stoughton	Serialised in Woman's Journal and in Woman's Home Companion (as Bright with Peril)	
She Painted Her Face	1937	Ward Lock & Co	Serialised in Woman's Journal and in Woman's Home Companion (as Counterfeit Coin)	
This Publican	1938	Ward Lock & Co	Serialised in Woman's Journal as She Knew Not Mercy. Published as The Devil in Satin in the US	
Gale Warning	1939	Ward Lock & Co	Serialised in Woman's Home Companion. First person narrative by John Bagot, includes Chandos and Mansel as characters. Part of the plot is continued in ‘Red in the Morning’.	
Shoal Water	1940	Ward Lock & Co	Serialised in Blue Book as When the Devil Drives. First person narrative by Jeremy Solon. Includes Mansel as a character.	
Period Stuff	1942	Ward Lock & Co	Short stories, some originally published in The Windsor Magazine and others in The Strand Magazine	
Lower than Vermin	1950	Ward Lock & Co	Novel	
Ne'er-Do-Well	1954	Ward Lock & Co	Yates's only detective story. First person narrative by Chandos, includes Mansel as a character	
Wife Apparent	1956	Ward Lock & Co	Originally intended to be called Lady in Waiting but the title was changed after the dust-cover had been printed due to another book with that title being published. First editions had the title over-printed with an explanatory note from the author	

== Other works ==
Other works
Title	Year of first publication	First edition publisher	Notes	Ref.
Temporary Insanity	1910	Punch	Uncollected short story, published 25 May 1910. The attribution to Yates appears in the June half-yearly index for Volume CXXXVIII (5 January to 29 June 1910)	
Like A Tale That Is Told	1910	Red Magazine	Uncollected short story, published 15 July 1910 (Volume VI issue 31)	
The Babes In The Wood	1910	Pearson's Magazine	Uncollected short story, published September 1910 (Volume XXX issue 177). The first story to feature 'Berry & Co'	
Rex-v-Blogg	1912	Pearson's Magazine	Uncollected short story, published February 1912 (Volume XXXIII issue 194)	
What I Know	1913	Mills & Boon	Ghost-written for C. W. Stamper (1876-1956), who acknowledges Yates' contribution in the foreword U.S. title King Edward As I Knew Him	
Valerie	1919	The Windsor Magazine	Uncollected short story, published October 1919 (volume L issue 298)	
Eastward Ho	1919	(Unpublished)	Musical comedy, written with Oscar Asche	
Court Cards	1927	The Windsor Magazine	Uncollected short story, published December 1926 (volume LXV issue 384)	
The Real Thing	1937	The Windsor Magazine	Uncollected short story, published April 1937 (volume LXXXV issue 508). Reprinted in Twelve Tales of Murder edited by Jack Adrian, Oxford University Press 1998	
Adventure in Publishing	1954	Ward Lock & Co	Preface to The House of Ward Lock 1854 to 1954 by Edward GD Liveing.	
The Best of Berry	1989	J.M.Dent & Sons Ltd	A selection of stories from The Courts of Idleness, Berry & Co, Jonah & Co, Maiden Stakes and And Berry Came Too, edited by Jack Adrian	

== Publishers ==
The eight books originally published in the United Kingdom by Hodder & Stoughton were re-issued by Ward Lock in 1943.

== Bibliography ==
- Smithers, AJ (1982). Dornford Yates. London: Hodder and Stoughton. ISBN 0-340-27547-2.
