= Red in the Morning =

1946 adventure novel by Dornford Yates

- 1946 dustjacket
- Author: Dornford Yates
- Series: Chandos books
- Genre: Novel
- Set in: France
- Publisher: Ward Lock & Co
- Publication date: 1946
- Media type: Print
- Pages: 255
- Preceded by: An Eye for a Tooth
- Followed by: Cost Price

Red in the Morning is a 1946 adventure novel by the English author Dornford Yates (Cecil William Mercer), the seventh in his 'Chandos' thriller series. The events of the story immediately follow those of his 1939 novel Gale Warning in which Richard Chandos and Jonathan Mansel appear as characters. The book was published in the US under the title Were Death Denied.

== Plot ==
The novel is largely set in the countryside around Pau, in South-West France, although Dieppe, Chartres and Vendôme also feature. Chandos and Mansel interfere with a gang robbery at Biarritz, and are hunted down with murderous intent by the gang's leader, Daniel Gedge ("Auntie Emma", previously bested by Mansel in Adèle and Co.). Characters familiar from earlier books include Jenny Chandos, John and Audrey Bagot, Carson, Bell, Rowley, Toby Rage, and the minor villain Punter. Other villains include the fallen scholar Brevet, counterfeiter Baron Horace de Parol (owner of the Château of Arx), and his niece, Mona Lelong ("The Stoat"). Lelong changes sides and helps Chandos escape capture through a series of partly-flooded caverns lying underneath the chateau.

== Background ==
Red in the Morning was written rapidly by Mercer, who needed at this stage in his life to ensure he remained in the ranks of best-selling authors. Much of his private fortune was tied up in his house "Cockade", south of Pau (the building of which was described in his novel of the year before, The House That Berry Built) and it was becoming increasingly likely that he and his wife would be unable to live there after the war.

== Critical reception ==
US edition

Although the war meant that the book could not be printed in the same quantities as previous books, it was still highly successful for the time. It shows no signs of having been written rapidly, and many followers of Mercer consider it to be one of his best.

== Bibliography ==
- Smithers, AJ (1982). Dornford Yates. London: Hodder and Stoughton. ISBN 0-340-27547-2.
