= Cost Price =

1949 adventure novel by Dornford Yates

- 1949 dustjacket
- Author: Dornford Yates
- Series: Chandos books
- Genre: Novel
- Publisher: Ward Lock & Co
- Publication date: 1949
- Media type: Print
- Pages: 286
- Preceded by: Red in the Morning

Cost Price is a 1949 adventure novel by the English author Dornford Yates (Cecil William Mercer), the eighth and last in his 'Chandos' thriller series. It serves as a sequel to his 1932 novel Safe Custody. The book was published in the US under the title The Laughing Bacchante.

== Plot ==
With Austria threatened by the Anschluss, John and Olivia Ferrers ask Richard Chandos and Jonathan Mansel to help them recover the priceless jewel collection of the Borgia Pope Alexander VI that, at the end of Safe Custody, had been left in a walled-up chamber of Hohenems Castle in Carinthia.

Punter, a minor villain who had been part of a previous attempt to steal the jewels, tells the educated crook Friar the story of that venture; and Friar, along with his associates Sloper, Orris and Goat, decides to make a further attempt. After Mansel foils them, Friar attracts the attention of a German, Boler, who adds to Mansel's difficulties. Diana Revoke, an upper-class Englishwoman, appears on the scene.

Having extracted the gems, and briefly taken refuge in Wagensburg Castle (the scene of the action in Blind Corner), Chandos joins a group of strolling players led by Jasper and Colette, to help smuggle them over the border into Italy and eventually to England where they are destined for a museum. Other characters from previous novels include the manservants Bell and Carson, Andrew Palin, and Jenny Chandos.

== Background ==
The book was published soon after Mercer had completed the building of a new house in Southern Rhodesia to which he and his wife had retired. This was his replacement for "Cockade" in Southern France (described in The House That Berry Built), which was empty and still a worry to him.

== Critical reception ==
US edition

Mercer's biographer AJ Smithers, writing in 1982, expressed admiration for the way in which Mercer marshalled his characters. By continually bringing back old friends who give the impression of being one big family, his readers feel almost honorary family members themselves.

== Bibliography ==
- Smithers, AJ (1982). Dornford Yates. London: Hodder and Stoughton. ISBN 0-340-27547-2.
