= The Berry Scene =

1947 short story collection by Dornford Yates

- First edition cover
- Author: Dornford Yates
- Series: Berry books
- Genre: Comic novel
- Publisher: Ward Lock & Co
- Publication date: 1947
- Media type: Print
- Pages: 286
- Preceded by: The House That Berry Built
- Followed by: As Berry and I Were Saying

The Berry Scene is a 1947 collection of comic short stories by the English author Dornford Yates (Cecil William Mercer), featuring his recurring 'Berry' characters.

== Plot ==
The book consistes of ten short stories, filling in some of the gaps in the earlier books, with a brief prologue recounting an episode of Berry's schooldays. Other characters from Yates's novels, including the Lyvedens (Anthony Lyveden), the Beaulieus (The Stolen March) and Jenny Chandos (She Fell Among Thieves), appear briefly.

== Chapters ==
Chapter	Title	Setting
	Prologue	Harrow School
I	In Which I Drive Daphne To Brooch on Midsummer Day, and Berry Gives Evidence	Hampshire, 1907
II	In Which Withyham Pays The Piper, But Berry Calls The Tune	Hampshire, 1907
III	In Which We Talk With Big James, and Daphne Has Eyes To See	Hampshire, 1907
IV	In Which We Play For The Village, And I Consider A Conversation Piece	Hampshire, 1914
V	In Which I Make Daphne A Present, And Berry Favours The Bold	London and Hampshire, 1924
VI	In Which Berry Is Attacked By Lumbago, And Jill Is Escorted To France	Hampshire and France, 1924
VII	In Which Berry Meets Mr. Wireworm, And I Keep The Truth To Myself	Hampshire and London, 1924
VIII	In Which We Fight For Our Rights, And An Old Acquaintance Does Us A Very Good Turn	Hampshire and London, 1934
IX	In Which Berry Keeps A Diary, And Tells Us A Fairy-Tale	Hampshire, Portugal and London, 1935
X	In Which Berry Dispenses Justice, And I Attend Fallow Hill Fair	Hampshire, 1936
	Epilogue	Portugal, 1946

== Critical reception ==
In his 1982 biography of Dornford Yates, AJ Smithers described the writing as 'elegant' while noting that certain chronological inconsistencies had by this time crept in to the narrative: "the reader must accept the fact without argument that Jonah bought his first Rolls at the age of sixteen. Readers are not expected to be too clever by half. If they are, they must suffer the consequences." "Mercer had reached a point where such things could not be helped."

== Bibliography ==
- Smithers, AJ (1982). Dornford Yates. London: Hodder and Stoughton. ISBN 0-340-27547-2.
