= And Berry Came Too =

1936 short story collection by Dornford Yates

- 1936 first edition cover
- Author: Dornford Yates
- Series: Berry books
- Genre: Comic novel
- Publisher: Ward Lock & Co
- Publication date: 1936
- Media type: Print
- Pages: 320
- Preceded by: Adèle and Co.
- Followed by: The House That Berry Built

And Berry Came Too is a 1936 collection of comic short stories by the English author Dornford Yates (Cecil William Mercer), featuring his recurring 'Berry' characters.

== Plot ==
The book consists of eight short stories, mostly set in Hampshire. According to an introductory note by the author, the action of the book may be presumed to have taken place during the summer between the events of chapters 1 and 2 of Berry and Co., ie some 16 years earlier. In addition to the regular "Berry & Co" characters this book also features the family's two-year-old Alsatian "The Knave", and a visiting American, Perdita Boyte.

== Background ==
All of the stories in And Berry Came Too had originally appeared in The Windsor Magazine between May and December 1935. They were written while Mercer was settled at Pau with his second wife, Elizabeth (whom he thought of as 'Jill', and to whom the book was dedicated).

== Chapters ==
Chapter	Book Title	Windsor Title	Date	Volume	Issue	Pages	Illustrator
I	How The Knave set out for Cock Feathers, and Berry made an acquaintance he did not desire	Enter The Knave	May 1935	LXXXI	485	715-734	E G Oakdale
II	How Berry perceived the obvious, and Daphne and I put spokes in each other's wheels	Period Stuff	June 1935	LXXXII	486	34-49	E G Oakdale
III	How Berry prophesied evil, and The Knave purged his contempt	The Law And The Prophet	July 1935	LXXXII	487	173-183	E G Oakdale
IV	How Daphne was given a present, and Jonah took off his coat	Black Magic	August 1935	LXXXII	488	274-288	E G Oakdale
V	How Perdita bought a staircase, and Berry put on a raiment that was not his	A Roman Holiday	September 1935	LXXXII	489	423-438	E G Oakdale
VI	How Berry met his match, and a mule lay down with The Knave	Spade Work	October 1935	LXXXII	490	649-665	E G Oakdale
VII	How Jill enjoyed herself, and Len and Winnie were made to waste valuable time	Big Business	November 1935	LXXXII	491	775-791	E G Oakdale
VIII	How Perdita left White Ladies, and Berry sat down with a lady who knew no law	Lady Friends	December 1935	LXXXIII	492	41-54	E G Oakdale

Four of the stories were serialised in Woman's Home Companion during 1935, illustrated by Frederick Chapman - chapter 1 in March, chapter 2 in May, chapter 4 in July and chapter 5 in September, under the same titles as The Windsor.

== Illustrations ==
The illustrations from the Windsor stories by E G Oakdale were not included in the book version.

== Critical reception ==
Punch reviewed the book on 29 January 1936. The reviewer welcomed the return of Berry after an absence of five years and suggested that the publication would be met with "a loud and general cheer". There was, however, some criticism of the author's "curious blind spot" in his portrayal of women, and in particular the way in which the narrator, Boy, maintains a commentary on the beauty, sweetness and virtue of the female characters, and the way in which he enthusiastically and repeatedly likens his girlfriend to a child. AJ Smithers in his 1982 biography considered this criticism to be 'entirely fair'.

== Bibliography ==
- Smithers, AJ (1982). Dornford Yates. London: Hodder and Stoughton. ISBN 0-340-27547-2.
