= An Eye for a Tooth =

1943 adventure novel by Dornford Yates

- 1943 dustjacket
- Author: Dornford Yates
- Series: Chandos books
- Genre: Novel
- Publisher: Ward Lock & Co
- Publication date: 1943
- Media type: Print
- Pages: 251
- Preceded by: She Fell Among Thieves
- Followed by: Red in the Morning

An Eye for a Tooth is a 1943 adventure novel by the English author Dornford Yates (Cecil William Mercer), the sixth in his 'Chandos' thriller series. The events of the story immediately follow those of Blind Corner.

== Plot ==
On the way home in the car with the treasure from Blind Corner, Mansel nearly runs over the corpse of a murdered man. He discovers the murderers, and seeks vengeance.

== Background ==
The novel's denouement may have been suggested by Christopher Marlowe's play The Jew of Malta in which most of the characters die after being deposited by a pivoting floor into a vat of boiling oil. AJ Smithers, the author's biographer, commented, "Mercer dispensed with the oil, but the principle was the same."

== Critical reception ==
US edition

The novel was well received, sold well, and had to be reprinted six times within a year of publication.

== Bibliography ==
- Smithers, AJ (1982). Dornford Yates. London: Hodder and Stoughton. ISBN 0-340-27547-2.
