= The Stolen March =

1926 fantasy novel by Dornford Yates

- 1930 dustjacket
- Author: Dornford Yates
- Genre: Novel
- Publisher: Ward Lock & Co
- Publication date: 1926
- Media type: Print
- Pages: 319

The Stolen March is a 1926 fantasy novel by the English author Dornford Yates (Cecil William Mercer), first serialised in The Windsor Magazine.

== Plot ==
The novel starts credibly enough, with the return of Simon and Patricia Beaulieu (previously seen in "Simon", one of the stories in As Other Men Are). Simon falls ill, and on medical advice the couple take a relaxed caravan holiday, driving down through France to the fictional country of Etchechuria, lying in the Pyrenees between France and Spain. En route they are joined by Eulalie (previously seen in chapter VIII of Jonah & Co, 1922) and Pomfret Tudor. There, fantastic things start to happen: they are addressed by a mule speaking English, and find themselves in a land peopled by animated illustrations and nursery rhyme characters. The tone becomes darker, and some of the characters start to develop murderous intent.

== Background ==
Mercer himself loved The Stolen March, but recognised that many readers did not. He later said that the editor of The Windsor Magazine would probably never have accepted the novel for serialisation had he realised at the start where the story would ultimately lead.

== Chapters ==
Chapter	Book Title	Windsor Title	Date	Volume	Issue	Pages	Illustrator
I	The Open Road	The Paying Of Paul	August 1925	LXII	368	241-255	Norah Schlegel
II	Enter Pomfret	The Rule Of Three	September 1925	LXII	369	361-375	Norah Schlegel
III	Blind Country	The Way Of A Man With A Mule	October 1925	LXII	370	479-492	Norah Schlegel
IV	Love Among The Mountains	On Velvet	November 1925	LXII	371	589-602	Norah Schlegel
V	Blood Royal	All On A Summer's Day	December 1925	LXIII	372	59-76	Norah Schlegel
VI	Publican And Sinner	Up To Date	January 1926	LXIII	373	180-195	Norah Schlegel
VII	The Cloven Hoof	The Short Lane	February 1926	LXIII	374	275-291	Norah Schlegel
VIII	Gathering Clouds	The Peck Of Pepper	March 1926	LXIII	375	405-419	Norah Schlegel
IX	King, Queen And Knave	Le Roy Le Veut	April 1926	LXIII	376	540-554	Norah Schlegel
X	Hue And Cry	Le Roy Le Veut/The Last Jest	April–May 1926	LXIII	376-377	554-560 & 649-655	Norah Schlegel
XI	Dolores	The Last Jest	May 1926	LXIII	377	655-667	Norah Schlegel

== Critical reception ==
Mercer’s biographer AJ Smithers, writing in 1982, considered that this book contains some of the author’s best pastoral writing, and that some of it is very funny indeed.

== Sequel ==
Mercer reported that he had "had a great many requests that I should turn again to Etchechuria" and had begun writing a book entitled The Tempered Wind which had reached fifty-one pages when his "subconscious brain stopped dead", and he eventually abandoned the project.

== Bibliography ==
- Smithers, AJ (1982). Dornford Yates. London: Hodder and Stoughton. ISBN 0-340-27547-2.
