= She Painted Her Face =

1937 novel by Dornford Yates

- First edition
- Author: Dornford Yates
- Genre: Novel
- Publisher: Ward Lock & Co
- Publication date: 1937
- Media type: Print
- Pages: 319

She Painted Her Face is a 1937 novel by the English author Dornford Yates (Cecil William Mercer). It was first serialised in Woman's Journal (December 1936 to April 1937, illustrated by Forster) and in Woman's Home Companion (December 1936 to May 1937, under the title Counterfeit Coin, illustrated by Frederick Chapman).

== Plot ==
Richard Exon (narrator) defends the life and birthright of Lady Elizabeth Virgil (Lady Caroline Virgil in the Woman's Journal serialisation). The castle of Brief, one hundred and twenty miles east of Innsbruck in Austria forms the backdrop, and has a hidden secret known only to the genuine Counts of Brief; a deep well on the neighbouring property of Palfrey provides the climax of the action.

Exon is assisted by his manservant, George Winter, and John Herrick, and they enlist the support of Harriet Vincentia Saying, Duchess of Whelp. They are opposed by Ferdinand, the false Count of Brief, and his son, Percy Elbert Vigil, a "clever unscrupulous blackguard", who seeks to do down his cousin, Lady Elizabeth.

== Background ==
Mercer’s biographer AJ Smithers noted that it cannot be by accident that one of the characters bears the name of Mercer's much loved grandmother, Harriet, and that the heroine is called Elizabeth, the name of his second wife.

== Critical reception ==
Smithers considered this book to be a pot-boiler, although "it is necessary to admit that the yarn is an excellent one, tautly written and as exciting as ever ... Few writers possessed such a gift for turning old material into acceptable wear”.

== Bibliography ==
- Smithers, AJ (1982). Dornford Yates. London: Hodder and Stoughton. ISBN 0-340-27547-2.
