= And Five Were Foolish =

1924 short story collection by Dornford Yates

- 1943 dustjacket
- Author: Dornford Yates
- Genre: Novel
- Publisher: Ward Lock & Co
- Publication date: 1924
- Media type: Print
- Pages: 311

And Five Were Foolish is a 1924 collection of short stories by the English author Dornford Yates (Cecil William Mercer), first published in The Windsor Magazine. The title is a reference to the Parable of the Ten Virgins.

== Plot ==
The book consists of ten short stories, several inspired by incidents and places known to Mercer and all named after a significant female character.

== Background ==
The stories were written for The Windsor Magazine, which boasted its readers had been "clamouring for more".

== Chapters ==
Chapter	Book title	Windsor title	Date	Volume	Issue	Pages	Illustrator
I	Sarah	False Pretences	November 1922	LVI	335	591-684	Henry Coller
II	Madeleine	Fine Linen	October 1922	LVI	334	463-473	E G Oakdale
III	Katharine	Three's Company	October 1923	LVIII	346	493-506	Norah Schlegel
IV	Spring	Groom Of The Chambers	November 1923	LVIII	347	587-600	Norah Schlegel
V	Elizabeth	A Drink Divine	December 1923	LIX	348	3-14	Norah Schlegel
VI	Jo	Private Papers	January 1924	LIX	349	115-127	Norah Schlegel
VII	Athalia	A Fool's Errand	February 1924	LIX	350	233-246	Norah Schlegel
VIII	Ann	Mesalliance	April 1924	LIX	352	505-523	Norah Schlegel
IX	Eleanor	A Private Scandal	March 1924	LIX	351	347-359	Norah Schlegel
X	Susan	Noblesse Oblige	May 1924	LIX	353	573-578	Norah Schlegel

== Critical reception ==
The collected volume was a significant success, reprinted seven times before World War II. The original dust jacket carried a Daily Telegraph quote:

The reader may decide for himself which five of Mr. Dornford Yates's virgins were foolish. Opinions will probably vary, and perhaps not one of the host of readers which the book deserves will compile a list tallying exactly with that which the author has drawn up in his own mind. But there will at least be unanimity on the point that here are ten extraordinary powerful and intriguing stories.

== Bibliography ==
- Smithers, AJ (1982). Dornford Yates. London: Hodder and Stoughton. ISBN 0-340-27547-2.
