= When the Devil Drives =

When the Devil Drives may refer to:

- When the Devil Drives, serialised version of Shoal Water, 1940 novel by Dornford Yates
- When the Devil Drives (film), 1922 American silent film
- When the Devil Drives, 2023 album by Econoline Crush
