= Period Stuff =

1942 story collection by Dornford Yates

- First edition
- Author: Dornford Yates
- Genre: Short stories
- Publisher: Ward Lock & Co
- Publication date: 1942
- Media type: Print
- Pages: 319

Period Stuff is a collection of short stories by the English author Dornford Yates (Cecil William Mercer). Some were written in 1939 but not published in book form until 1942. Some of the tales had originally appeared in The Windsor Magazine and others in The Strand Magazine.

== Stories ==
| Chapter | Title | Magazine | Date | Volume | Issue | Pages | Illustrator |
|---|---|---|---|---|---|---|---|
| I | My Lady's Chamber | The Windsor | September 1927 | LXVI | 393 | 394-407 | Howard K Elcock |
| II | Behind The Scenes | | | | | | |
| III | A Special Case | The Windsor | May 1939 | LXXXIX | 533 | 704-716 | Isabel Veevers |
| IV | His Brother's Wife | The Windsor | September 1939 | XC | 537 | 410-419 | Claude Bendall |
| V | While The Iron Is Hot | | | | | | |
| VI | Beggar On Horseback | The Strand | February 1940 | XCVIII | 590 | 314-325 | Jack Grandfield |
| VII | Finesse | | | | | | |
| VIII | Missing, Believed Killed | Woman's Home Companion | October 1941 | | | | Floyd Davis |
| IX | And Adela, Too | The Strand | June 1941 | CI | 606 | 82-90 | M Mackinlay |
| X | Above Suspicion | The Strand | October 1940 | XCIX | 598 | 426-435 | M Mackinlay |
| XI | Smooth Justice | | | | | | |
| XII | Way Of Escape | | | | | | |
| XIII | Period Stuff | | | | | | |

== Bibliography ==
- Smithers, AJ (1982). Dornford Yates. London: Hodder and Stoughton. ISBN 0-340-27547-2.
