= Summer Fruit =

1929 omnibus volume by Dornford Yates

- 1929 cover
- Author: Dornford Yates
- Genre: Novel (omnibus volume)
- Publisher: Minton, Balch & Company
- Publication date: 1929
- Media type: Print
- Pages: 410

Summer Fruit is a 1929 omnibus volume by the English author Dornford Yates (Cecil William Mercer) containing the two novels Anthony Lyveden (1921) and Valerie French (1923). It was published by Minton, Balch & Company of New York. No similar omnibus volume was published in the UK.

== Plot ==
The book is divided into Part 1 and Part 2, being the equivalent of the two source novels. The chapter headings are the same as for the UK edition of those novels.

In Part 1, Anthony Lyveden DSO, a destitute ex-officer, is forced to take a job as a footman at the Gramarye estate. The estate's owner, Colonel Winchester, becomes mad and leaves Lyveden in charge under a power of attorney. The situation drives Lyveden himself to madness.

In Part 2, Anthony Lyveden loses his memory, and confuses the two women who love him: Valerie French and André Strongi’th’arm.

== Critical reception ==
The book was published at a difficult time for Mercer, when relations between him and his wife Bettine were getting steadily worse. Nevertheless, the dedication read "To the American girl who did me the lasting honour to become my wife."

== Bibliography ==
- Smithers, AJ (1982). Dornford Yates. London: Hodder and Stoughton. ISBN 0-340-27547-2.
