= Gale Warning =

1939 novel by Dornford Yates

- First edition
- Author: Dornford Yates
- Genre: Novel
- Publisher: Ward Lock & Co
- Publication date: 1939
- Media type: Print
- Pages: 313

Gale Warning is a 1939 novel by the English author Dornford Yates (Cecil William Mercer). It was first serialised in Woman's Home Companion (March 1939 to August 1939, illustrated by Floyd Davis). Although it includes Chandos and Mansel, as a first person narrative by another character it is not normally counted as one of the author's 'Chandos' books.

== Plot ==
John Bagot narrates a tale featuring Jonathan Mansel as the head of a small private organisation dedicated to the suppression of serious crime by unorthodox means. A villain, Barabbas, takes revenge when Mansel kills a minor member of his gang, and Mansel and friends set out in pursuit to seek vengeance. The Chateau of Midian forms the final backdrop.

== Critical reception ==
Mercer’s biographer AJ Smithers, writing in 1982, noted that this novel and the next, Shoal Water, are written to a pattern, though one that is cunningly woven. He considered both books to be swiftly moving, just plausible, and to still bear re-reading after all these years.

== Bibliography ==
- Smithers, AJ (1982). Dornford Yates. London: Hodder and Stoughton. ISBN 0-340-27547-2.
