= Ne'er-do-well (disambiguation) =

A ne'er-do-well is a good-for-nothing person.

Ne'er-do-well may also refer to:

- The Ne'er-do-Weel, an 1878 play by W. S. Gilbert, revived soon afterwards as The Vagabond
- The Ne'er-Do-Well, a 1911 novel by Rex Beach, adapted for film several times in the silent era
- The Ne'er-Do-Well (1916 film), a 1916 American silent adventure crime drama film
- The Ne'er-Do-Well, a 1923 silent film directed by Alfred E. Green
- Ne'er-Do-Well, a 1956 novel by Dornford Yates
- Ne'er Do Wells, a rock band
