= As Other Men Are =

1925 short story collection by Dornford Yates

- First edition
- Author: Dornford Yates
- Genre: Novel
- Publisher: Ward Lock & Co
- Publication date: 1925
- Media type: Print
- Pages: 317

As Other Men Are is a 1925 collection of short stories by the English author Dornford Yates (Cecil William Mercer), first published in The Windsor Magazine. The title is a reference to the parable of the Pharisee and the Publican.

== Plot ==
The book consists of ten short stories, many of which revolve around the relations between an impecunious former officer of the Great War and a woman of wealth. The title of each is the name of a significant male character.

== Background ==
The stories were written for The Windsor Magazine.

== Chapters ==
Chapter	Book Title	Windsor Title	Date	Volume	Issue	Pages	Illustrator
I	Jeremy	Unto Caesar	June 1924	LX	354	3-16	Norah Schlegel
II	Simon	Shorn Lambs	July 1924	LX	355	119-131	Norah Schlegel
III	Toby	Without Prejudice	August 1924	LX	356	239-251	Norah Schlegel
IV	Oliver	Old Ale	September 1924	LX	357	353-364	Norah Schlegel
V	Christopher	The Lord Of The Manor	October 1924	LX	358	473-485	Norah Schlegel
VI	Ivan	Leading Strings	December 1924	LXI	360	23-35	Norah Schlegel
VII	Hubert	Contrary Winds	January 1925	LXI	361	135-146	Norah Schlegel
VIII	Titus	Ways And Means	February 1925	LXI	362	255-270	Norah Schlegel
IX	Peregrine	Fallen Sparrows	November 1924	LX	359	587-598	Norah Schlegel
X	Derry	The Flat Of The Sword	March 1925	LXI	363	377-390	Norah Schlegel

== Critical reception ==
The author’s biographer AJ Smithers noted that these tales have a rather harsher tone than that of the earlier stories. Although they all have a happy ending, as required by the editor of The Windsor Magazine, he felt that by this date the writer was no longer seeing romance in the old-fashioned way. Some of his women can be greedy and vinegar-tongued, particularly the American women. Mercer's own wife, Bettine, was American and Smithers speculated that his tone was a reflection of the couple's marital problems, or that these stories were intended as a deliberate insult to her.

== Bibliography ==
- Smithers, AJ (1982). Dornford Yates. London: Hodder and Stoughton. ISBN 0-340-27547-2.
