= Berry and Co. =

1921 short story collection by Dornford Yates

- c1935 printing
- Author: Dornford Yates
- Series: Berry books
- Genre: Short stories
- Publisher: Ward Lock & Co
- Publication date: 1921
- Media type: Print
- Pages: 308
- Preceded by: The Courts of Idleness
- Followed by: Jonah and Co.

Berry and Co. is a 1921 collection of comic short stories by the English author Dornford Yates (Cecil William Mercer), his third book, featuring his recurring characters Bertram ('Berry') Pleydell, his wife and cousin Daphne Pleydell, Daphne's brother Boy Pleydell, another cousin Jonathan ('Jonah') Mansel, and Jonah's younger sister Jill Mansel. The group of five – Berry, Daphne, Boy, Jonah and Jill – are collectively 'Berry and Co.'

== Contents ==
The book consists of short stories featuring Berry, Daphne, Boy, Jonah and Jill, set at 'White Ladies', Hampshire and at 'Cholmondeley Street', Mayfair in London in 1919 and 1920. In chapter 4, a Sealyham Terrier called Nobby joins the family. In the final story, Boy and Adèle (who had first appeared in The Courts of Idleness) become engaged.

== Background ==
All of the stories in Berry and Co. had originally appeared in The Windsor Magazine between December 1919 and December 1920. It was with the publication of Berry and Co. that Mercer finally made his mark as an author: the book proved to be extremely popular and was reprinted almost annually until the outbreak of the Second World War.

== Chapters ==
Chapter	Book Title	Windsor Title	Date	Volume	Issue	Pages	Illustrator
I	How Will Noggin was fooled, and Berry rode forth against his will	A Blue Letter Day	December 1919	LI	300	20–31	Norah Schlegel
II	How Daphne wrote for assistance, and Mr Holly was outbid	The Unknown Quality	March 1920	LI	303	335–346	Norah Schlegel
III	How a man may follow his own hat, and Berry took a lamp in his hand	In This Connection	April 1920	LI	304	357–368	Norah Schlegel
IV	How Nobby came to sleep upon my bed, and Berry fell among thieves	The Accusative Case	May 1920	LI	305	457–470	Norah Schlegel
V	How Jill's education was improved, and Daphne gave her husband the slip	We Are Seven	June 1920	LII	306	3–15	Norah Schlegel
VI	How Nobby attended a wedding, and Berry spoke nothing but the truth	A Friend At Court	July 1920	LII	307	103–117	Norah Schlegel
VII	How Jonah obeyed his orders, and Daphne and Katharine Festival backed the same horse	Too Many Cooks	August 1920	LII	308	209–222	Norah Schlegel
VIII	How Jill slept undisturbed, and Nobby attended church parade	A Trick Of Memory	September 1920	LII	309	317–330	Norah Schlegel
IX	How Adèle Feste arrived, and Mr Dunkelsbaum supped with the Devil	A Bootless Enterprise	October 1920	LII	310	424–437	Norah Schlegel
X	How Adèle broke her dream, and Vandy Pleydell took exercise	A Lesson In Latin	November 1920	LII	311	527–541	Norah Schlegel
XI	How Nobby met Blue Bandala, and Adèle gave Jonah a kiss	A Double Event	December 1920	LIII	312	3–17	Norah Schlegel

== Illustrations ==
The illustrations from the Windsor stories were not included in the book version, although one of the illustrations by Norah Schlegel (1879–1963) from "A Double Event" was used to illustrate the dustjacket of the first edition. Her illustration for "A Trick Of Memory" was used as the basis for the cover illustration by Bill Dare of The Best of Berry (1989) in the Classic Thrillers series of paperbacks issued by J.M.Dent & Sons Ltd.

== Critical reception ==
In his 1982 biography of the author, AJ Smithers noted that the stories in Berry and Co. are longer and much funnier than the earlier tales, and he called the book "as fresh as the day it left the printers." His view was that "the reading public of the time revelled in it; their grandchildren still do; very probably the same will be said by their own."

Richard Usborne in Clubland Heroes (1974) summarised a typical story: "Argument, persiflage, Berry over-ridden, plot, plot thickens, car chase, Berry goes off on sleeveless errand, Berry's long, 'priceless' Messenger's Speech ... Family tottering with laughter. Berry discomfited .. last word ... with Berry. End."

== Bibliography ==
- Smithers, AJ (1982). Dornford Yates. London: Hodder and Stoughton. ISBN 0-340-27547-2.
- Usborne, Richard (1974). Clubland Heroes. London: Barrie & Jenkins. ISBN 0-214-20012-4.
