= Maiden Stakes =

1929 short story collection by Dornford Yates

- First edition
- Author: Dornford Yates
- Genre: Novel
- Publisher: Ward Lock & Co
- Publication date: 1929
- Media type: Print
- Pages: 319

Maiden Stakes is a 1929 collection of short stories by the English author Dornford Yates (Cecil William Mercer) originally written for The Windsor Magazine.

== Plot ==
The book largely consists of stand-alone short stories, but one ("Letters Patent") features the author's 'Berry' characters and references his 1928 novel Perishable Goods.

== Background ==
The stories originally appeared in The Windsor Magazine.

== Chapters ==
Chapter	Title	Windsor Date	Volume	Issue	Pages	Illustrator
I	Childish Things	July 1925	LXII	366	121–133	Albert Bailey
II	St. Jeames	August 1927	LXVI	392	265–277	Lindsay Cable
III	Aesop's Fable	October 1927	LXVII	394	513–524	Lindsay Cable
IV	Vanity Of Vanities	January 1928	LXVIII	397	170–180	Norah Schlegel
V	Force Majeure	March 1928	LXVIII	399	386–398	Henry Coller
VI	Bricks Without Straw	December 1927	LXVIII	396	21–31	Lindsay Cable
VII	'Service'	April 1929	LXIX	412	593–608	P B Hickling
VIII	In Evidence	February 1929	LXIX	410	289–302	J Dewar Mills
IX	Maiden Stakes	March 1929	LXIX	411	451–465	R Allen Shuffrey
X	Letters Patent	January 1929	LXIX	409	157–169	Lindsay Cable

"Childish Things" and "Aesop's Fable" appeared in The Saturday Evening Post editions of 27 June 1925 and 10 September 1927 respectively. "St Jeames" appeared in Ladies' Home Journal in August 1927.

== Critical reception ==
The book was written at a difficult time for Mercer, when relations between him and his wife Bettine were getting steadily worse. Nevertheless, the original dedication read "To the American girl who did me the lasting honour to become my wife." In later editions this was changed to "To those exquisite summer evenings, when I have sat, in my shirt-sleeves, two thousand five hundred feet up, watching my elders and betters using the scythe, and, by their comfortable labour, performing the incredible feat of adding sweetness to the mountain air."

== Bibliography ==
- Smithers, AJ (1982). Dornford Yates. London: Hodder and Stoughton. ISBN 0-340-27547-2.
