= This Publican =

1938 novel by Dornford Yates

- 1938 dustjacket
- Author: Dornford Yates
- Genre: Novel
- Publisher: Ward Lock & Co
- Publication date: 1938
- Media type: Print
- Pages: 320

This Publican (The Devil in Satin in the US) is a 1938 novel by the English author Dornford Yates (Cecil William Mercer). It was first serialised as She Knew Not Mercy in Woman's Journal for November 1937 to March 1938, with illustrations by Forster.

== Plot ==
The dreadful Rowena has married the serious-minded and naive young barrister David Bohun. She treats him abominably, and is at the end of the book unmasked as an imposter and murderer who has used Bohun as a stepping stone to better things.

== Background ==
Mercer’s biographer AJ Smithers, writing in 1982, noted “a school of thought” that holds this book to be Mercer’s revenge upon his first wife, Bettine, as a fictionalised account of their marriage. This he considered to be untenable for a variety of reasons including the lack of any possible resemblance between Mercer's first wife and the villain, the lack of similarity of events, and the fact that the author was very happily remarried by the time he wrote the book and would hardly have waited years to reopen any old wound.

Yates himself said that Rowena "combined the worst characteristics of three women that I did know."

== Critical reception ==
1938 US edition (Doubleday, Doran)

Readers did not share Mercer's own high opinion of the book.

== Bibliography ==
- Smithers, AJ (1982). Dornford Yates. London: Hodder and Stoughton. ISBN 0-340-27547-2.
