= Safe Custody =

1932 novel by Dornford Yates

- First edition
- Author: Dornford Yates
- Genre: Novel
- Publisher: Hodder and Stoughton
- Publication date: 1932
- Media type: Print
- Pages: 317

Safe Custody is a 1932 novel by the English author Dornford Yates (Cecil William Mercer). It was serialised weekly in five parts in The Saturday Evening Post in October and November 1931 as "Your Castle of Hohenems", illustrated by F. R. Gruger.

It was Yates's first adventure novel to not feature Richard Chandos, and introduced new heroes: John Ferrers (who narrates the story), and his cousin Hubert Constable. Two minor villains, Punter and Bunch, who featured in Perishable Goods, are the only characters from previous novels.

The castle of Hohenems has the same name as a town in Vorarlberg, but in the book is located in Carinthia.

== Plot ==
Ferrers and Constable inherit the Castle of Hohenems in Austria and seek the priceless carved jewel collection of its former owner, the Borgia Pope Alexander VI, walled up within the dungeons. They team up with Andrew Palin to outwit the thief Harris and his ally Father Herman Haydn. Lady Olivia Haydn, Father Herman's niece, joins forces with the heroes.

== Background ==
The author, living in France at the time, seems to have been homesick, as the dedication reads "To the finest city in the world incomparable LONDON TOWN".

== Critical reception ==
Mercer’s biographer AJ Smithers, writing in 1982, suggested that "his public ought to have become disenchanted by now with such well-worn stuff, but it cannot be denied that Safe Custody came as fresh as any of the others". It sold well, as usual.

The original dustjacket included the following quotes -

- Morning Post: "A romance full of adventure."
- Howard Marshall in the Daily Telegraph: "Swift-moving and entertaining."
- Evening News: "A grand story'"
- Sphere: "Amazing and breathless incidents...Mr.Yates at the top of his form...a most capital yarn."
- Ralph Strauss in the Sunday Times: "A really good yarn."
- John o' London's Weekly: "A masterly tale of adventure."
- Norman Collins in the News Chronicle: "An entirely delicious 'thriller.' "

== Bibliography ==
- Smithers, AJ (1982). Dornford Yates. London: Hodder and Stoughton. ISBN 0-340-27547-2.
