= The House That Berry Built =

1945 novel by Dornford Yates

- First edition cover
- Author: Dornford Yates
- Cover artist: J. F. Campbell
- Language: English
- Series: The Berry books
- Genre: Semi-Autobiographical Comic novel
- Publisher: Ward Lock & Co
- Publication date: 1945
- Publication place: United Kingdom
- Media type: Print
- Pages: 286
- OCLC: 504077289
- Preceded by: And Berry Came Too
- Followed by: The Berry Scene

The House That Berry Built is a 1945 humorous semi-autobiographical novel by the English author Dornford Yates (Cecil William Mercer), featuring his recurring 'Berry' characters. It is a lightly fictionalised recounting of the construction of the author's house Cockade in the commune of Eaux-Bonnes, Pyrénées-Atlantiques, France.

== Plot ==
Unable any longer to afford their aristocratic lifestyle in England, Berry and Co decide in 1937 to relinquish White Ladies, their ancestral home in Hampshire, to the state for the use of the Foreign Secretary. Nostalgic for a vanished world of social events and elegant idleness, Berry and his friends move to Pau in the South of France where they spend their days picnicking on the slopes of the Ossau Valley. Deciding to settle nearby, they acquire some land on the green mountainside halfway between the thermal spa of Lally and the village of Besse and build themselves a substantial property that they name Gracedieu.

Although the novel includes a minor sub-plot regarding the family's investigation of a murder, it consists principally of a detailed description of the building of Gracedieu. The cost of the work, the risks of the construction techniques employed, the whims of the mountain weather and the relations with the local contractor are all carefully detailed.

In an earlier book, Adèle and Co. (1931), Jill had been married to Piers, Duke of Padua, and had baby twins. Now, she explains in a matter-of-fact manner "It was awful, you know, when Piers and my babies were killed. They went down in a plane together." With Boy's ex-wife Adèle having returned to her native America some years earlier, and deciding not to come back, Boy and Jill are free to fall in love; and towards the end of the novel the couple marry.

The extended family move in to the completed house but, amid increasing signs of war, it soon becomes clear that they cannot remain.

A later book of memoirs, As Berry and I Were Saying, includes a semi-fictionalised account of Berry and Co's attempted return to Gracedieu after the war. It is noted there that after "eight soul-searing months" the family found it impossible to stay on in France.

== Background ==
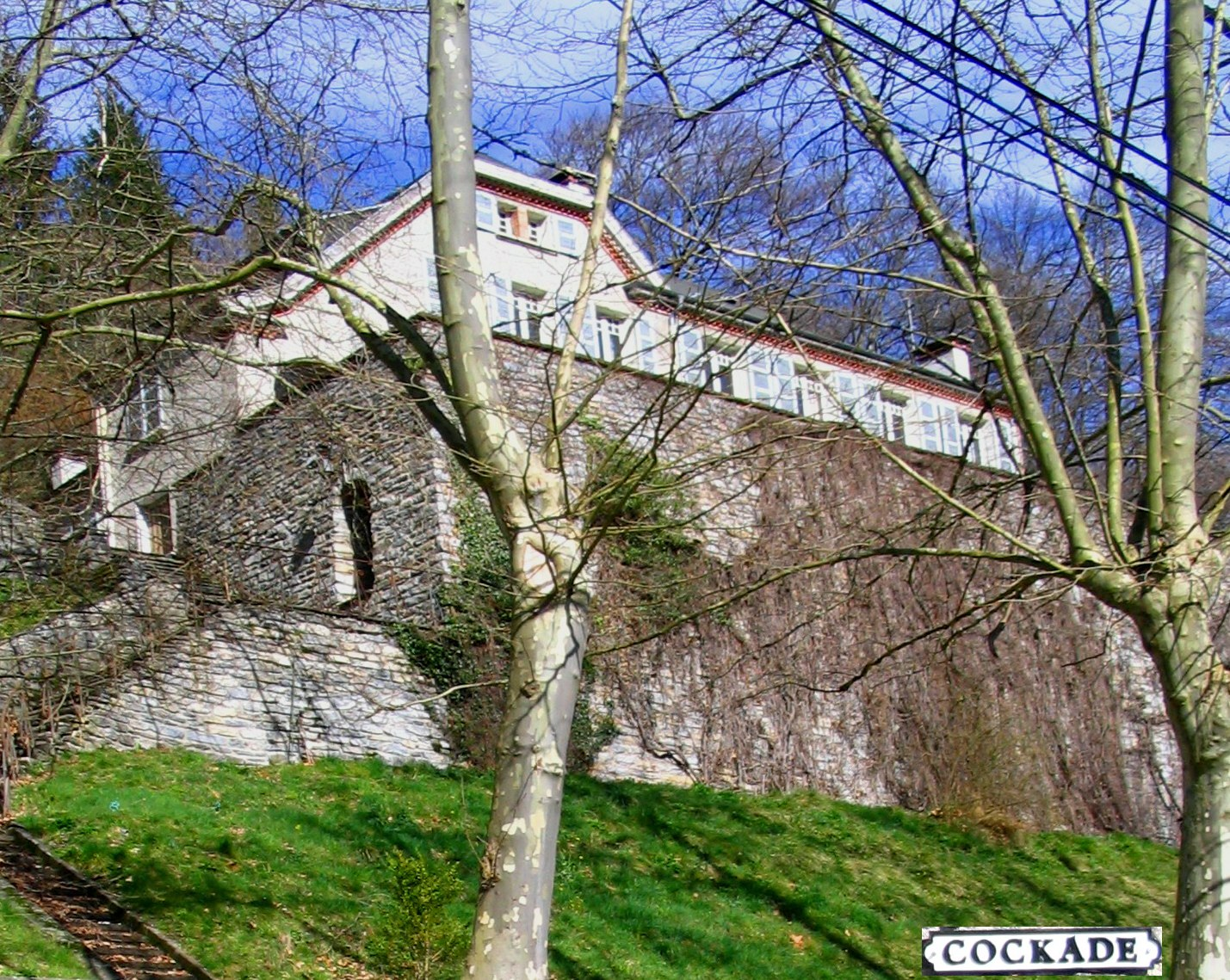
Cockade, the real-life equivalent of the novel's Gracedieu

Much of the novel is an accurate account of the building of Cockade, the writer's own residence that he completed in 1939, a little way out of Eaux-Bonnes, south of Pau. It was a substantial six-bedroom property, called Cockade because of the way in which it projected from the hill as does a hackle from a hat.

As in the novel, Mercer and his wife did not have long to appreciate their new house before they were forced out by the arrival of war. They fled precipitately in 1940 and with some difficulties drove through Franco's Spain to Portugal, from where they sailed on to South Africa.

After the war was over the couple briefly returned, but finding things greatly changed did not linger for long. They eventually built themselves a replacement house, Sacradown, in Umtali, Southern Rhodesia, completed in 1948.

== Critical reception ==
According to AJ Smithers in his 1982 biography, The House That Berry Built represents the author at the peak of his form, with Berry never being in better voice.

== Bibliography ==
- Smithers, AJ (1982). Dornford Yates. London: Hodder and Stoughton. ISBN 0-340-27547-2.
