= She Fell Among Thieves =

1935 adventure novel by Dornford Yates

- First edition
- Author: Dornford Yates
- Series: Chandos books
- Genre: Novel
- Publisher: Hodder and Stoughton
- Publication date: 1935
- Media type: Print
- Pages: 320
- Preceded by: Fire Below
- Followed by: An Eye for a Tooth

She Fell Among Thieves is a 1935 adventure novel by the English author Dornford Yates (Cecil William Mercer), the fifth in his 'Chandos' thriller series. It was serialised in Woman's Journal (December 1934 to April 1935, illustrated by Forster). The title comes from a phrase in the Parable of the Good Samaritan.

== Plot ==
The story is set in the Pyrenees. Chandos, recently widowed, and Mansel rescue a drugged young woman who is being held captive at Château Jezreel by the villainous elderly matriarch Vanity Fair.

== Background ==
She Fell Among Thieves was written shortly after Mercer's second marriage, to Elizabeth, and was dedicated "To Jill" – the name he always used for her.

== Critical reception ==
The novel was not quite as well received as the earlier 'Chandos' books had been. Although it was accepted for UK serialisation in the Woman's Journal, appearing in five parts between December 1934 and April 1935, the US Saturday Evening Post declined it, female villains not being to American taste.

== Dramatisation ==
- In 1978 the BBC produced a TV film based on the novel
- On 15 May 2004 BBC Radio 4 broadcast a Saturday Play based on the book, dramatised by Michelene Wandor and directed by Chris Wallis, with Honor Blackman as Vanity Fair, Nicholas Boulton as Chandos, Tim Frances as Mansel, Jessica Lloyd as Virginia, David Thorpe as Gaston, Robert Whelan as Acorn, Jane Collingwood as Jenny and Harry Myers as Bell.

== Bibliography ==
- Smithers, AJ (1982). Dornford Yates. London: Hodder and Stoughton. ISBN 0-340-27547-2.
