= Ward Lock travel guides =

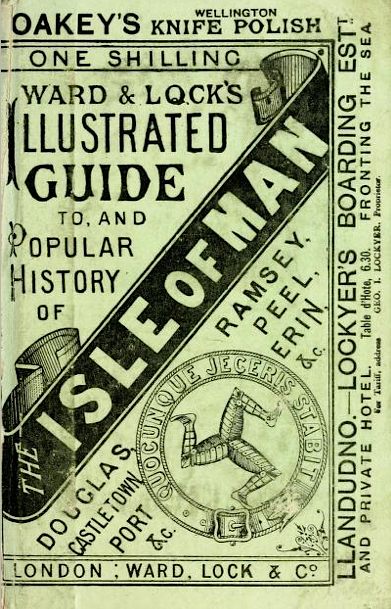
Ward & Lock's Illustrated Guide to and Popular History of the Isle of Man, 1883

Ward Lock travel guides or Red Guides (1870s–1970s) were tourist guide books to the British Isles and continental Europe published by Ward, Lock & Co. of London. The firm proclaimed them "amusing and readable" and the "cheapest and most trustworthy guides." To other readers the books were promotional and "rarely critical." Compared to similar late 19th century series such as Methuen & Co.'s Little Guides, the Ward Lock guides emphasized "travel practicalities."

== List of Ward Lock guides by geographic coverage ==
- Ward & Lock's Descriptive and Pictorial Guide to the Isle of Man, London: Ward, Lock, and Co., 1883, OL 19370678M
- Pictorial and Descriptive Guide to the Channel Islands. 1902.

=== Belgium ===
- Guide to Belgium, including the Ardennes and Luxemburg (5th ed.). London: Ward, Lock & Co. c. 1909.
- Handbook to Belgium and the Battlefields (7th ed.). London: Ward, Lock & Co. 1921. + Index

=== England ===
==== East Midlands region ====
- Nottingham and its Environs.
- Ward and Lock's Illustrated Guide to, and Popular History of Buxton, Matlock, Dovedale, Alton Towers, and the Peak District. 1880.

==== East of England region ====
- Pictorial and Descriptive Guide to Felixstowe. 1910.
- Pictorial and Descriptive Guide to Aldeburgh. 1911.

==== London region ====
- Pictorial Guide to London, London: Ward & Lock, 1879
  - 1901 ed.
  - Pictorial and Descriptive Guide to London and its Environs (28th ed.), London: Ward, Lock & Co., 1907 + Index
- Ward and Lock's Holiday Trips Round and About London. London: Ward, Lock & Co. c. 1880. + Index

==== North East England region ====
- Ward and Lock's Illustrated Guide to, and Popular History of Redcar, Saltburn-by-the-Sea, &c. 1883.

==== North West England region ====
- Southport and its Vicinity.
- Ward & Lock's (late Shaw's) Tourists' Picturesque Guide to Liverpool and its Environs (5th ed.). c. 1881.
- Ward and Lock's pictorial and historical guide to Furness Abbey, with excursions around Morecambe Bay. 1884.
- Pictorial and Descriptive Guide to the English Lake District (17th ed.), London: Ward, Lock, 1916, OL 14034359M

==== South East England region ====
- Brighton and its Suburbs.
- Pictorial and Descriptive Guide to the Isle of Wight (14th ed.).
- Windsor and its Castle.
- Pictorial and Descriptive Guide to Eastbourne, Beachy Head, Seaford, &c, London: Ward, Lock and Co., 1901, OL 17987498M
- Pictorial and Descriptive Guide to Brighton and Hove, the South Downs, Shoreham, Bramber, Lewes, Newhaven, Seaford, etc.: with routes for motorists and cyclists (6th ed.). 1908.
- Pictorial and Descriptive Guide to Broadstairs. 1910.
- Pictorial and Descriptive Guide to Canterbury. 1910.
- Pictorial and Descriptive Guide to Canterbury, Herne Bay, Whitstable and the Isle of Thanet, London: Ward, Lock & Co., 1920, OL 14034358M
- Pictorial and Descriptive Guide to Ramsgate, Broadstairs, Sandwich, Margate, Canterbury, and North-East Kent (7th ed.). c. 1922.

==== South West England region ====
- Exeter and South-East Devon.
- Guide to Exeter. London: Ward, Lock & Co. 1899.
- Pictorial and Descriptive Guide to Bideford, Clovelly, Hartland, Barnstaple, Ilfracombe and North-West Devon, London: Ward, Lock & Co., 1900, OL 17986428M
- Pictorial and Descriptive Guide to Plymouth, Stonehouse, Devonport, and South-West Devon. London: Ward, Lock & Co. c. 1901.
- Pictorial and Descriptive Guide to Falmouth. 1910.
- Pictorial and Descriptive Guide to Newquay and North Cornwall (9th ed.). 1927.
- Pictorial and Descriptive Guide to St Ives, Carbis Bay, Penzance, Land's End and the Isles of Scilly (11th ed.). 1927.
- Pictorial and Descriptive Guide to Penzance and West Cornwall (11th ed.). 1928.
- Ward, Lock and Company (1921), Pictorial and Descriptive Guide to Weymouth, Portland, Dorchester, Lulworth, Swanage, Sherborne, etc., London, OL 23367098M
- Pictorial and Descriptive Guide to Falmouth, the Lizard, Truro, St. Austell, Fowey, and South Cornwall (7th ed.). c. 1922.
- Pictorial and Descriptive Guide to Ilfracombe, Barnstaple, Bideford, Woolacombe, and North-West Devon (10th ed.). c. 1922.

==== West Midlands (region) ====
- Birmingham and its Neighborhood.
- Ward and Lock's Pictorial Guide to Warwickshire. 1882.
- Ward & Lock's (Late Shaw's) Illustrated Guide to, and Popular History of Leamington & Warwick: with Excursions to Kenilworth, Stratford-on-Avon, and other Places in the Neighbourhood. Leamington: Thos. Simmons. 1888.
  - Illustrated Guide to, and Popular History of Leamington & Warwick: with excursions to Kenilworth, Stratford-on-Avon, and other places in the neighbourhood. c. 1891.
- Pictorial and Descriptive Guide to Royal Leamington Spa, Warwick, Guy's Cliff, Kenilworth, Stratford-upon-Avon, Coventry, the George Eliot country, etc. 1900.
- Pictorial and Descriptive Guide to Stratford-upon-Avon (3rd ed.). 1907.

==== Yorkshire and the Humber region ====
- Leeds and its Vicinity.
- Pictorial and Descriptive Guide to Harrogate. Ward, Lock & Bowden. 1894.
- Yorkshire coast from Hornsea to Redcar, including Bridlington, Filey, Scarborough, Robin Hood's Bay, Whitby, Saltburn. 1960.
- Bridlington, Flamborough, Filey, Scarborough, Hornsea. 1924.

=== France ===
- Riviera, Nice, Cannes, Mentone, Monte Carlo, Monaco, Hyères, Genoa, &c.
- Pictorial and Descriptive Guide to the Channel Islands: with short excursions to Brittany and Normandy. 1902.
- Guide to Paris and its Environs (7th ed.). Paris: W.H. Smith & Son. 1913.
- Handbook to Paris and its Environs (11th ed.). London: Ward, Lock & Co. c. 1922.

=== Ireland ===
- Belfast and its Neighborhood.
- Limerick, the Shannon, Kilkee, &c.
- Ward and Lock's Pictorial and Historical Guide to Cork and its Neighbourhood: With Excursions to Bantry, Glengarriff, Killarney, and Other Places in the South-West of Ireland. London: Ward, Lock, and Co. c. 1885.
- Pictorial and Descriptive Guide to Cork, Queenstown, the Blackwater, Glengariff, Killarney, and the south-west of Ireland (6th ed.). c. 1912.
- A Pictorial and Descriptive Guide to Dublin and the Wicklow tours, London: Ward, Lock and Company, 1919, OCLC 8105082, OL 23663882M

=== Italy ===
- Handbook to Rome and its Environs (3rd ed.). London: Ward, Lock & Co. 1929.

=== Netherlands ===
- Illustrated Guide to the Rhine. 1884.
- Guide to Holland (5th ed.). London: Ward, Lock & Co. 1909.
- Handbook to Holland (7th ed.). London: Ward, Lock & Co. 1921. + Index

=== Scotland ===
- Edinburgh and its Environs.
- Ward & Lock's (late Shaw's) Illustrated Guide to, and Popular History of Loch Lomond, the Trosachs, Loch Katrine, etc. 1880s.
- Ward & Lock's (late Shaw's) Illustrated Guide to, and Popular History of the land of Burns, including Ayr, Arran, and Dumfries. 1880s.
- Ward & Lock's Popular History of and Illustrated Guide to Perth, Dundee and other Interesting Places near the East Coast of Scotland. 1882.
- Ward, Lock & Co (1882). Eastern Highlands.
- Guide to Aberdeen, Deeside and Donside ... and the Moray Firth Coast. 1901.
- Pictorial and Descriptive Guide to Glasgow and the Clyde. 1915.
- Pictorial and Descriptive Guide to Oban, Fort William, the Caledonian Canal, Iona, Staffa, and the Western Highlands (5th ed.). c. 1917.

=== Switzerland ===
- Guide to Switzerland (6th ed.). London: Ward, Lock & Co. c. 1909.

=== Wales ===
- Ward and Lock's (late Shaw's) Illustrated Guide to and Popular History of North Wales. London: Ward, Lock & Co. c. 1884.
- Pictorial and Descriptive Guide to Bangor. 1910s.
- Pictorial and Descriptive Guide to Colwyn Bay. 1910s.
- Pictorial and Descriptive Guide to Llandudno. 1910s.
- Pictorial and Descriptive Guide to Rhyl. 1910s.
- New Pictorial and Descriptive Guide to Tenby, Pembroke, Carmarthen, and South Wales. 1912.
- Pictorial and Descriptive Guide to Cardiff and South Wales. c. 1917.
- North Wales (southern section): Aberystwyth, Towyn, Barmouth, Criccieth, Pwllheli, Llangollen, Snowdon, etc (13th ed.). 1959.
