= Wife Apparent =

1956 novel by Dornford Yates

- First edition, reprinted 1956
- Author: Dornford Yates
- Publisher: Ward Lock & Co
- Publication date: 1956
- Media type: Print
- Pages: 315

Wife Apparent is a 1956 book by the English author Dornford Yates (Cecil William Mercer), his last novel. The book was originally to be called Lady-in-Waiting, but this had to be changed at the last moment as another book with the same title was scheduled to appear at about the same time.

== Introductory note ==
As described by the author in an introductory note, the novel comprises two parts. Part One is told in the first person and Part Two in the third, with the action taking place over a total period of two years. The novel is set in the present (that is, in 1956).

== Plot summary ==
Major Coridon Gore, aged 42, a well-known novelist, lives quietly in Elm Cottage near the fictional village of Halliard in Hampshire, looked after by his devoted housekeeper Florence Davey. As a consequence of a head injury he received during the war, Gore suffers from occasional lapses of memory. His sole confidant and 'Privy Counsellor', to whom he speaks every day, is the cottage's ancient and majestic elm.

Unknown to Gore, his godfather has left him the sum of £10,000 in his will provided that he is found to be 'up and dressed' when his executors call at exactly half past nine. When the executors arrive unannounced, they find Gore in his shirtsleeves and they fraudulently intend to withhold the inheritance. They are thwarted by Gore's good friend and family solicitor Pompey Colbourne.

One morning, while Gore is communing with the elm, a young woman who is holidaying nearby walks past the gate. They fall into conversation, although without exchanging names. A few days later, Gore receives in the post an unsigned card with an exquisite drawing of him and the elm. Meeting again at Ascot, Gore learns that she is Niobe Coke, aged 26. The pair rapidly fall in love. Two days before their intended wedding, while Gore is staying in London, the elm is brought down by an overnight storm, a disaster that the family fear will affect his fragile mind. But even before the news can be broken to him, Gore suffers an attack of amnesia while walking down Bond Street and completely forgets who he is. Gore is identified by the tailor's label in his suit, and his sister Cleopatra is informed.

Niobe and Cleopatra seek advice from the eminent physician Dr Berserk. He tells them that Gore should recover provided that he continues to live very quietly for the next six months, but that he will need a close companion of his own class. Niobe decides to live with him under the pretence that their marriage did in fact take place as planned. Although unable to remember any of his friends and family, Gore readily accepts Niobe as his wife, and grows to love her anew. He does not realise that the elm is gone, and to avoid distressing him the family do not mention it.

After some months, the family decide that Gore really must be told that he is as yet unmarried. He is horrified but, deeply in love, readily agrees to marry straight away. Niobe arranges to have some of her drawings commercially published, Pompey taking on the role of her agent.

One sultry day, exactly a year after they first met, the couple visit Ascot again. Gore gets a headache, and as they are driving home his lost memories suddenly return – though he does not know it. Niobe is beside herself with worry about the shock he must experience when he realises that the elm is gone. Fortunately, her worries are not borne out, and he faces the loss by noting that she herself has now replaced the tree as his Privy Counsellor.

== Critical reception ==
On the book's publication, John Metcalf of The Sunday Times opined that “Mr Dornford Yates’s fantasy life is rich enough to make millionaires superfluous”. He called his middle-aged author-hero "a very parfait gentil survivor from the world of Berry & Co." and wished "[g]ood luck to him and all wandering coelacanths".

Yates's 1982 biographer, AJ Smithers, however, felt that the author's imagination was beginning to flag and that this book was not amongst his best. He noted that several plot devices had been used before, including the wood-magic of a favourite elm, the immobilised officer with a head wound that renders him amnesiac, and jactitation of marriage by a respectable young woman for excellent reasons.

Writing in 2015, Kate Macdonald called the novel "a triumphant return to [Yates'] playful and witty style of the 1920s, an emotionally taut comedy of recovery from wartime brain damage, set in an English Arcadia".
