= She Fell Among Thieves (film) =

1978 film by Clive Donner

- Radio Times cover
- Directed by: Clive Donner
- Based on: She Fell Among Thieves by Dornford Yates
- Distributed by: BBC
- Release date: 1978
- Country: United Kingdom
- Language: English

She Fell Among Thieves is a 1978 British television film based on the novel of the same name by Dornford Yates, adapted for television by Tom Sharpe. It stars Malcolm McDowell and Eileen Atkins and was directed by Clive Donner. It was first broadcast on BBC2 on Wednesday 1 March 1978 at 9:40 p.m. as “Play of the Week.”

It was one of three television films made by the BBC and Donner which focused on British heroes between the wars, the others being Rogue Male and The Three Hostages.

== Plot ==
The French Pyrenees. At the Château Jezreel, a young Englishwoman, Jenny, is being forced into marriage, but the groom, Gaston, collapses drunk at the altar. Vanity Fair, Jenny's stepmother, is furious with Candle, one of Vanity's sidekicks who is best man. If Jenny does not marry shortly, Vanity forfeits £20 million. Acorn, another sidekick, suggests they use a substitute bride; Vanity likes this and wants Candle disposed of.

Nearby, Richard Chandos is fishing with his servant Bell. Vanity's limousine goes past with Jenny and Candle inside, then returns rapidly. Candle's corpse floats downstream; Chandos dives in to rescue it but the current is too fast, and the dead man's shoe comes off in his hand. Chandos suspects murder.

At the British consulate in Biarritz, Chandos meets Jonathan Mansel. Mansel identifies the shoe as belonging to Elvin Candle, a former painter he knew at Oxford who fell from grace and ended up working as a counterfeiter for Vanity, a crime boss.

Chandos takes Mansel, Bell, and Mansel's servant Carson to the bridge where he saw the limousine. When it passes, they follow it to Jezreel. A young woman Bell recognises as an actress arrives at the château.

Chandos engineers a crash between his Rolls and Vanity's limousine. Attracted to him, Vanity insists he stay with her. Chandos has dinner with Vanity, Acorn, Gaston, Virginia (the actress, pretending to be Jenny) and Father Below (an English priest who knew Chandos's father at Balliol).

Next morning, Vanity lets Chandos drive her car to the nearest village to wire for a mechanic. Instead, he rendezvouses with Mansel. Mansel arrives at Jezreel, impersonating a Rolls Royce mechanic called Wright. A suspicious Vanity inspects his hands, clearly not those of a labourer.

Mansel explains Vanity's plot to Chandos: according to her late husband's will, if Jenny marries before coming of age, Vanity gets his whole fortune. He orders Chandos to excuse himself and say he is crossing into Spain, but actually do some reconnaissance.

At dinner, Vanity quizzes Chandos: she knows the post-office he claims he telegraphed from is closed. Vanity slips a pill into Chandos's drink. Chandos, retired to his bedroom, passes out. Mansel checks in, but cannot wake him; glancing outside, he sees one of Vanity's servants approaching with a hypodermic. He switches the footwear outside the bedroom (so Gaston gets the fatal injection meant for Chandos) and leaves a note warning Chandos not to return. Next morning, a maid leaves a breakfast tray on top of the note. Chandos goes out to reconnoitre.

Vanity reads the note: Acorn orders a search for 'Wright'. Mark, Vanity's chauffeur, asks Below if he's seen Wright; Below sees Mansel hiding, but lies and says he hasn't. Mansel and Below talk in the château's chapel: Below has taken pity on Mansel as he is a fugitive himself.

Mark smuggles Gaston's body out into the countryside. Chandos, while hillwalking, sees this. Seeking somewhere to hide, he finds Jenny sitting outside a small cottage. They get talking and he realises her identity.

They witness Lafone, one of Vanity's employees, supervising the digging of Gaston's grave. Once this is done, Lafone brains the gravedigger and shoves him in. Jenny screams, alerting Mark who chases her and Chandos. The couple escape.

Vanity is livid: Jenny's birthday is tomorrow, so she must be married by nightfall. Vanity can use Virginia as a proxy bride, but she needs to replace Gaston, and settles for Acorn.

Chandos leaves Jenny with Carson, before returning to Jezreel with Bell. After he enters, the portcullis comes down, trapping him. Hearing footsteps approaching, Chandos hides in a cabinet; Vanity appears and locks him in.

Acorn forges a letter in Chandos's handwriting, telling Mansel to take Jenny to Biarritz. This is thrown out of a window and picked up by Bell. Chandos manages to escape from the château, but gets to Carson too late to stop Bell. Vanity ambushes Bell and Jenny, and takes her back to Jezreel. When Mansel and Chandos return, the portcullis is down. Chandos decides to scale the château wall, while Mansel goes for the police.

Jenny sobs, saying she'd rather marry Chandos than Acorn; Vanity likes the idea. When Chandos clambers through a window, Vanity seizes him, forcing him to marry Jenny at gunpoint. Below conducts the service in Latin.

Mansel storms the wedding party, saying the police have found the bodies of Gaston and the gravedigger. Below announces he read the service for the dying, so Jenny and Chandos are not married. Facing execution for her crimes, Vanity takes poison.

== Cast ==
- Richard Chandos - Malcolm McDowell
- Vanity Fair - Eileen Atkins
- Jonathan Mansel - Michael Jayston
- Jenny - Karen Dotrice
- Virginia - Sarah Badel
- Acorn - Philip Locke
- Father Below - Richard Pearson
- Lafone - Freda Jackson
- Bell - Ralph Arliss
- Carson - Bernard Hill
- Candle - Simon Cadell
- Gaston - Jonathan Lynn
- Jean - Pat Gorman
- Luis - Derek Deadman
- Mark - Anthony Scott

== Credits ==
- Music composed by: John Cameron
- Film Editor: Chris Lovett
- Photography: Brian Tufano
- Script Editor: Richard Broke
- Designer: Tony Abbott
- Producer: Mark Shivas
- Director: Clive Donner

== Production ==
Screenwriter Tom Sharpe had conflicted feelings about Yates's novels: "Yates was a marvellous storyteller. Even now I can pick up one of his books and find myself reading on and on and on, and this in spite of his mannered style and his appalling snobbery. I find myself torn between admiration for the craftsman and revulsion at the sickly sentimentality". After finishing work on his adaptation, he told Yates's biographer A.J. Smithers, "there wasn't enough gold in the Bank of England to get him to do another". Sharpe's script deviates significantly from the original.

Though set in the Pyrenees, the film was shot in Wales, with Castell Coch standing in for the château where much of the action takes place. A Guardian article credits "Laurie Boynton" as the stuntman who doubles for McDowell in the scene where his character makes a 50-foot leap between the castle's towers. Producer Mark Shivas had planned a longer series of these films, but budgetary constraints forced the BBC to cut it short after three.

== Reception ==
Writing in The Observer, Jonathan Meades expressed disdain for Yates's novel, with its "preposterous and complicated" plot, but praised Sharpe's script and the acting (especially Atkins and Locke), concluding: "the highest honours, though, must go to the designers Tony Abbott and (posthumously) the great William Burges who built the sublime folly which stands in for the Pyrenean château".

Joan Bakewell in The Times applauded the cast ("led by Eileen Atkins in high Bette Davis style") and the production values, but felt the weakness lay with Yates's source material and the film's ironic treatment of it: "In the end it is the plot that must gather speed and tension, not the jokey asides or funny frocks... how can you grit your teeth when you have got your tongue so thoroughly in your cheek?" Regarding Yates's allegedly poor plotting, a member of the public wrote to The Times in response, pointing out the differences between the film and the novel, where Vanity Fair's scheme is a mystery that the heroes uncover (in the film it is clear from the start).

Sean Day-Lewis in The Daily Telegraph was more positive, feeling that the film maintained a stylistic balance: "The achievement of the film was to present the proceedings as a fairy story–how, once upon a time, the gallant Sir Richard rescued the fair Princess Jenny from the clutches of her evil stepmother–and also to maintain the tense suspense of a well-made thriller. There was no descent to caricature". Like Bakewell, he praised the cast and the production ("stylishly directed by Clive Donner to something like feature film standards").

Reviewing for The Guardian, Nancy Banks-Smith felt it impossible to keep up with the plot: "When mini-villains were being chewed up in traps suitable for the larger sort of carnivore and gravediggers bundled into their handiwork, my notes read only helplessly 'What the hell's going on here?'" Nonetheless she appreciated McDowell and the production values: "The sort of sets so deep buttoned and thick piled that you long to poke them to see if they dimple."

David Coward in The Sunday Times commented on the liberties taken with Yates's plot and the film's ironic tone, but praised "a marvellously outrageous Eileen Atkins as Vanity Fair, caparisoned like the witch in 'Snow White.'"

The film appeared in America on 5 February 1980, as the first episode of PBS's Mystery! series. Reviewing in The New York Times, John O'Connor gave the cast high praise, particularly Atkins: "With red hair and ultra-white makeup, Miss Atkins looks like Good Queen Bess as she might be conceived on canvas by Francis Bacon. Her diction and gestures suggest a parody of Bette Davis. Her dominating presence is calculatedly absurd and indisputably riveting." He summed up, "Whatever She Fell Among Thieves lacks in mystery is compensated for by the sheer spectacle of outstanding talent at work."

When it appeared on DVD, David Wiegand in The San Francisco Chronicle called it "one of the most enjoyable bad movies you've seen in a long time, thanks largely to over-the-top performances by superb actors in an over-the-top and completely unbelievable story". He called Atkins's high-camp performance the highlight: "She obviously has great fun with the role and doesn't even attempt a moment of credibility."
