= Shoal Water =

1940 novel by Dornford Yates

- First edition
- Author: Dornford Yates
- Genre: Novel
- Publisher: Ward Lock & Co
- Publication date: 1940
- Media type: Print
- Pages: 317

Shoal Water is a 1940 novel by the English author Dornford Yates (Cecil William Mercer). It was first serialised in Blue Book between July and October 1940, as When The Devil Drives, with illustrations by Austin Briggs.

== Plot ==
Jeremy Solon (narrator) falls in with Katherine Scrope and learns she has been blackmailed into doing duty as a carrier for jewel thieves. She is kidnapped, and Solon and his companions – now including Jonathan Mansel – set out to rescue her.

== Background ==
The dust jacket of the first edition bears on the back the words "The making of this book enabled me to forget the gathering clouds: it is my great hope that the reading of it will enable others to forget the storm."

== Critical reception ==
US dustjacket (Putnam)

Mercer's biographer AJ Smithers, writing in 1982, noted that this novel and the preceding one, Gale Warning, are written to a pattern, though one that is cunningly woven. He considered both books to be swiftly moving, just plausible, and to still bear re-reading after all these years. The second half of the book bears considerable resemblance to A. E. W. Mason's 1935 novel They Wouldn't Be Chessmen.

== Bibliography ==
- Smithers, AJ (1982). Dornford Yates. London: Hodder and Stoughton. ISBN 0-340-27547-2.
