= Jonah and Co. =

1922 short story collection by Dornford Yates

- 1943 printing
- Author: Dornford Yates
- Series: Berry books
- Genre: Short stories
- Publisher: Ward Lock & Co
- Publication date: 1922
- Media type: Print
- Pages: 320
- Preceded by: Berry and Co.
- Followed by: Adèle and Co.

Jonah and Co. is a 1922 collection of comic short stories by the English author Dornford Yates (Cecil William Mercer), featuring his recurring 'Berry' characters.

== Plot ==
Berry, Daphne, Jonah, Jill, Boy and Adèle (with Nobby the Sealyham Terrier) travel by road through France to winter in Pau. While staying there they venture into northern Spain.

Boy and Adèle are newly married. Jill meets her future husband, Piers, Duke of Padua.

== Background ==
This was a happy period in Mercer's life; he had acquired a villa in Pau in South-west France, and his characters followed him there. It became the Mercer family's permanent home in 1922 after the book was published.

All of the stories in Jonah and Co. had originally appeared in The Windsor Magazine between October 1921 and September 1922, although the original editions of the book (until c. 1925) included a Prologue and Epilogue that had not been included in the magazine. These were subsequently reprinted in The Best of Berry (Dent's Classic Thrillers, 1989) as The Gypsy's Warning and The Fairy Child respectively.

== Chapters ==
Chapter	Book Title	Windsor Title	Date	Volume	Issue	Pages	Illustrator
	Prologue						
I	How Berry stepped into the breach, and Jonah came first and was served	The Rule Of The Road	October 1921	LIV	322	449-460	Norah Schlegel
II	How three wagers were made, and Adèle killed two birds with one stone	A Run For Our Money	November 1921	LIV	323	551-562	Norah Schlegel
III	How a Golden Calf was set up, and Nobby showed himself a true prophet	By Order Of The Trustees	December 1921	LV	324	3-14	Norah Schlegel
IV	How Berry made an engagement, Jill a picture, and Adèle a slip of some importance	A Snare And A Delusion	January 1922	LV	325	105-116	Norah Schlegel
V	How love came to Jill, Herbert to the rescue, and a young man by his right	Nobility And Gentry	February 1922	LV	326	215-227	Norah Schlegel
VI	How Berry ran contraband goods, and the Duke of Padua plighted Jill his troth	Manners And Customs	March 1922	LV	327	331-345	Norah Schlegel
VII	How Daphne lost her bedfellow, and the line of least resistance proved irresistible	A Royal Progress	April 1922	LV	328	447-458	Norah Schlegel
VIII	How Adèle bought a bottle of perfume which had no smell, and I cut Eulalie dead	Red Violets	May 1922	LV	329	561-572	Norah Schlegel
IX	How Jonah took off his coat, and Berry flirted with Fortune for all he was worth	Zero	June 1922	LVI	330	3-15	Norah Schlegel
X	How Berry sought comfort in van, and Nobby slept upon a Queen's bed	No Thoroughfare	July 1922	LVI	331	113-125	Norah Schlegel
XI	How Berry put off his manhood, and Adèle showed a fair pair of heels	A Tight Place	August 1922	LVI	332	229-241	Norah Schlegel
XII	How a telegram came for Jill, Piers demanded his sweetheart, and I drove after my wife	Journeys End	September 1922	LVI	333	345-357	Norah Schlegel
	Epilogue						

== Illustrations ==
The illustrations from the Windsor stories by Norah Schlegel (1879-1963) were not included in the book version.

== Critical reception ==
Jonah and Co. was as commercially successful as Berry and Co. had been. In his 1982 biography of the author, AJ Smithers considered that Berry remains dauntlessly funny, and at the top of his form: "A merry journey over the long roads of France ... and all written with the freshness of one who was discovering these things for the first time."

== Bibliography ==
- Smithers, AJ (1982). Dornford Yates. London: Hodder and Stoughton. ISBN 0-340-27547-2.
