= Valerie French (novel) =

1923 adventure novel by Dornford Yates

- 1940 dustjacket
- Author: Dornford Yates
- Genre: Novel
- Publisher: Ward Lock & Co
- Publication date: 1923
- Media type: Print
- Pages: 312
- Preceded by: Anthony Lyveden

Valerie French is a 1923 adventure novel by the English author Dornford Yates (Cecil William Mercer), a sequel to Anthony Lyveden. It was first published in monthly instalments in The Windsor Magazine.

== Plot ==
Anthony Lyveden loses his memory, and confuses the two women who love him, Valerie French and André Strongi’th’arm.

== Background ==
After completing Anthony Lyveden, the chance reading of an article in The Spectator convinced Mercer that his writing needed more gravitas, and he significantly altered his style for this volume to incorporate the systematic use of the colon. He also introduced a device that became his trademark – the words 'More' or 'Worse' standing alone between periods. His biographer AJ Smithers commented, "Whether or not this was an improvement on his old style must be a matter of opinion."

== Chapters ==
Chapter	Book Title	Windsor Title	Date	Volume	Issue	Pages	Illustrator
I	A Pillar Of Salt	A Pillar Of Salt	December 1922	LVII	336	3-16	Norah Schlegel
II	Leviathan	Rogues And Vagabonds	January 1923	LVII	337	130-142	Norah Schlegel
III	Figs Of Thistles	Figs Of Thistles	February 1923	LVII	338	248-260	Norah Schlegel
IV	Blind Alley	Blind Alley	March 1923	LVII	339	372-386	Norah Schlegel
V	Fallacy Row	Fallacy Row	April 1923	LVII	340	483-494	Norah Schlegel
VI	Poor Players	Poor Players	May 1923	LVII	341	603-614	Norah Schlegel
VII	The Sieve Of Vanity	The Sieve Of Vanity	June 1923	LVIII	342	17-30	Norah Schlegel
VIII	Straight Street	Straight Street	July 1923	LVIII	343	141-154	Norah Schlegel
IX	The Swine's Snout	The Swine's Snout	August 1923	LVIII	344	261-275	Norah Schlegel
X	Until The Day Break	Until The Day Break	September 1923	LVIII	345	405-419	Norah Schlegel

== Illustrations ==
The illustrations from the Windsor stories by Norah Schlegel (1879-1963) were not included in the book version.

== Critical reception ==
The editor of The Windsor Magazine reluctantly agreed to accept the book for publication. Smithers, writing in 1982, was not enthusiastic either, commenting that the seams show too clearly where the individual episodes have been padded out to the required length by moralising. He found both Lyveden and Miss French to be austere characters to whom it is impossible to warm, and felt that Mercer preferred the dog in his story to any of his human characters – and that he was probably right.

== Bibliography ==
- Smithers, AJ (1982). Dornford Yates. London: Hodder and Stoughton. ISBN 0-340-27547-2.
