= Adèle and Co. =

1931 novel by Dornford Yates

- First edition
- Author: Dornford Yates
- Series: Berry books
- Genre: Comic novel
- Publisher: Hodder and Stoughton
- Publication date: 1931
- Media type: Print
- Pages: 320
- Preceded by: Jonah and Co.
- Followed by: And Berry Came Too

Adèle and Co. is a 1931 comic novel by the English author Dornford Yates (Cecil William Mercer), featuring his recurring 'Berry' characters. This was Yates's first full-length Berry novel, following several earlier Berry short story collections. It was the first Berry book to be published in the UK by Hodder & Stoughton, and the first not to be serialised in The Windsor Magazine.

== Plot ==
The Berry family awaken in Paris from a drugged sleep to find that all their jewels have been stolen by their erstwhile friend, Casca de Palk. Led by Jonah Mansel, they chase the thief through France (while fending off the attentions of another group of thieves led by the notorious "Auntie Emma"), to Dieppe, Rouen, Tours and the Pyrenees, ending with a climactic encounter on the Spanish border near the Pic du Midi d'Ossau.

Boy & Adèle, and Berry & Daphne, remain married. Jill is now married to Piers, Duke of Padua, and has baby twins.

The book represents Adèle's valediction within the Berry series; she never appears again.

== Background ==
Although this was the first complete Berry book since 1922, the characters had had cameo roles in other Yates stories since, and there was a complete Berry story called "Letters Patent" in The Windsor Magazine in January 1929 which subsequently appeared in the book Maiden Stakes.

In contrast with the gaiety of the writing, Mercer was at this time at a miserable period in his personal life, his first marriage to Bettine having failed by the time of publication in 1931. By 1933 the couple were divorced.

== Chapters ==
Chapter	Title
I	We Sup With The Devil
II	Expert Evidence
III	Berry Protests And Is Corrupted
IV	Adèle Stoops To Conquer
V	Perfect Ladies
VI	Plot And Counterplot
VII	We Get Together
VIII	Alarms And Excursions
IX	Pray Silence For Berry
X	A Lesson In French
XI	We Sail Very Close To The Wind
XII	Enter Hortense

== Critical reception ==
According to AJ Smithers in his 1982 biography, Adèle and Co. is the author's most joyous and uproarious book, and is in the opinion of many the very best of the Berry series. It is designed as a connected whole, includes crime, and is presented in some of the funniest writing in the English language.

The original dustjacket included the following quotes -

- Morning Post: "The charming and irrepressible Berry!"
- Daily Telegraph: "It is, indeed, great fun all the way."
- Times Literary Supplement: "Those who have asked Dornford Yates for 'More Berry' will not be disappointed."
- Spectator: "How pleasant it is to meet Berry again."
- Star: "Riotous fun with breathless excitement."

== Bibliography ==
- Smithers, AJ (1982). Dornford Yates. London: Hodder and Stoughton. ISBN 0-340-27547-2.
