= B-Berry and I Look Back =

1958 fictionalised memoirs of Dornford Yates

- First edition cover
- Author: Dornford Yates
- Series: Berry books
- Genre: Fictionalised memoirs
- Publisher: Ward Lock & Co
- Publication date: 1958
- Media type: Print
- Pages: 284
- Preceded by: As Berry and I Were Saying

B-Berry and I Look Back is the second volume of fictionalised memoirs of the English author Dornford Yates (Cecil William Mercer), published in 1958 and featuring his recurring 'Berry' characters - Berry, Daphne, Boy, Jill and Jonah. The first volume, As Berry and I Were Saying, had been published in 1952. B-Berry and I Look Back was Yates's last book.

== Contents ==
In an introductory note, the author states that the book contains recollections of true occasions and incidents within a fictional setting. He emphasises that "the memories themselves are strictly true and that I have exaggerated nothing."

The book begins with a story in the style of previous 'Berry' tales before reverting to the reminiscing style of As Berry and I Were Saying. It ends with an epilogue in the form of a letter from the loyal servant Bridget Ightham to her brother in Hampshire describing her life with Berry & Co in retirement in Portugal.

== Critical reception ==
According to Yates's biographer, AJ Smithers, "The book Is a patch-work, including short visits to the Bar, the stage and the amusements of a London now rapidly vanishing into history."

The memoirs have been called "denunciations of the changing times", and despite the claim to veracity in the introductory note are "highly subjective opinions on the past", with unhistorical episodes that "valorise the past at the expense of the post-war present".

== Bibliography ==
- Smithers, AJ (1982). Dornford Yates. London: Hodder and Stoughton. ISBN 0-340-27547-2.
