= Blood Royal =

1929 adventure novel by Dornford Yates

- Title page for Blood Royal (1949 edition)
- Author: Dornford Yates
- Series: Chandos books
- Genre: Novel
- Publisher: Hodder and Stoughton
- Publication date: 1929
- Media type: Print
- Pages: 320
- Preceded by: Perishable Goods
- Followed by: Fire Below

Blood Royal is a 1929 novel by the English author Dornford Yates (Cecil William Mercer), the third in his Chandos thriller series. The story features the recurrent characters Richard Chandos (narrator) and George Hanbury, with their servants Bell and Rowley. Jonathan Mansel does not appear in this book.

== Plot ==
Chandos and Hanbury help Duke Paul to succeed as Prince of the fictional Principality of Reichtenburg in place of the incumbent, in the face of resistance from Duke Johann and Major Grieg.

== Background ==
Commenting in 1958 through his character Boy Pleydell, the author acknowledged resemblances between his work and Anthony Hope's The Prisoner of Zenda and Rupert of Hentzau, specifically citing this novel and Fire Below.

== Critical reception ==
Blood Royal was as well-received when it appeared in July 1929 as his earlier Chandos books had been, and was re-printed four times within the first six months. Mercer hoped to run the story as a serial in the US publication The Saturday Evening Post, but flatly refused the Post's demand that Chandos should be an American citizen.

This was mentioned by Yates in As Berry and I were Saying, along with a discussion with an editor preparing a serialisation of Blood Royal who objected to the car being identified as a Rolls-Royce saying "We don't give advertisements". Yates' response was "..there are two kinds of automobiles - one is a Rolls and the other a motor-car. In Blood Royal I'm referring to a Rolls." The editor was reported to have laughed and conceded the point, but no serialisation of Blood Royal is known to have taken place.

According to Mercer's biographer, AJ Smithers, the author's talent for this type of story was immense. The reader is kept on the edge of the chair, and the pace never flags.

== Bibliography ==
- Smithers, AJ (1982). Dornford Yates. London: Hodder and Stoughton. ISBN 0-340-27547-2.
