= Blind Corner (novel) =

1927 adventure novel by Dornford Yates

- 1940 H&S dustjacket
- Author: Dornford Yates
- Series: Chandos books
- Genre: Novel
- Publisher: Hodder and Stoughton
- Publication date: 1927
- Media type: Print
- Pages: 312
- Followed by: Perishable Goods

Blind Corner is a 1927 novel by the English author Dornford Yates (Cecil William Mercer). The book was the first in his Chandos thriller series and is narrated in the first person by Richard Chandos. In addition to Chandos and his servant Bell, the novel features a cast of characters who recur in many of the later books: George Hanbury and Jonathan Mansel; their respective servants Rowley and Carson; and Tester the Sealyham terrier. Mansel's character also appears as Jonah Mansel in the author's 'Berry' series of comic books and short stories, though he is not written for comic effect in this nor the later Chandos books.

== Plot ==
Richard Chandos, the story's narrator, witnesses a murder and acquires the victim's Alsatian dog. On the dog's collar his friend Jonathan Mansel finds an inscription telling of treasure hidden within a well in the Austrian castle of Wagensburg. Chandos, Mansel, and their friend George Hanbury set out to recover it, accompanied by their servants, Bell, Rowley and Carson. They become trapped underground and attacked by enemies, led by 'Rose' Noble, but ultimately escape with the treasure.

== Background ==
Blind Corner was Mercer's first foray into the thriller genre, having found himself bored with writing romantic fiction. He wanted to write something "worthier of a real author" along the lines of Bulldog Drummond or The Thirty-Nine Steps. He took as his pattern Treasure Island, and the book owes much to Robert Louis Stevenson. A non-comic thriller was a departure for the author, and neither The Windsor Magazine nor Ward Lock, the publisher of his other books, were interested. The novel was ultimately published by Hodder and Stoughton in the UK in January 1927.

An abridged version of the story, under the title The Treasure of the Well, was published in Short Stories magazine in its USA edition of 25 July 1927, and in its UK edition of mid-December 1927. Along with the other seven Yates books originally published in the United Kingdom by Hodder & Stoughton, Blind Corner was re-issued by Ward Lock during World War II.

== Critical reception ==
Blind Corner was well-reviewed, did well, and made the author's reputation with a new reading public.

In his 1982 biography of Dornford Yates, AJ Smithers suggested that Blind Corner was the best adventure story of the inter-war years. He found the writing to be fine indeed, the description of the fight in the dark exciting, and the tension built up during the tunnelling operations even more so.

Richard Usborne in Clubland Heroes (1974) noted that in this and the other Chandos books the author makes use of prose that, while still stylish, tends more to pomp and pageantry than that of the Berry books, a style perhaps suited to Chandos, the solemn and humourless man who is supposed to be writing them.

== Bibliography ==
- Smithers, AJ (1982). Dornford Yates. London: Hodder and Stoughton. ISBN 0-340-27547-2.
- Usborne, Richard (1974). Clubland Heroes. London: Barrie & Jenkins. ISBN 0-214-20012-4.
