= Perishable Goods =

1928 novel by Dornford Yates

- First edition dustjacket
- Author: Dornford Yates
- Series: Chandos books
- Genre: Novel
- Publisher: Hodder and Stoughton
- Publication date: 1928
- Media type: Print
- Pages: 310
- Preceded by: Blind Corner
- Followed by: Blood Royal

Perishable Goods is a 1928 novel by the English author Dornford Yates (Cecil William Mercer), the second in his Chandos thriller series and a sequel to Blind Corner. The story features the recurrent characters Richard Chandos (narrator), Jonathan Mansel and George Hanbury, with their respective servants Bell, Carson and Rowley.

== Plot ==
While on holiday at Poganec in Carinthia with Berry, Daphne and Boy (from the Berry books), Adèle is kidnapped by the villain 'Rose' Noble (in revenge for his defeat in Blind Corner) and is held captive at the Castle of Gath near Lass. A ransom is demanded. She is rescued by Chandos, Mansel, Hanbury and their servants.

== Background ==
According to Mercer's biographer, AJ Smithers, the author took inspiration from Anthony Hope: "Perishable Goods is The Prisoner of Zenda, with variations." The author himself, commenting in 1958 through his character Boy Pleydell, acknowledged resemblances between his work and that of Hope, but mentioned specifically not this novel but the next two, Blood Royal and Fire Below.

The book was such a success that the author concentrated on Chandos in the years to come, reducing his work on light romantic material.

== Critical reception ==
Perishable Goods was warmly-reviewed when it appeared in July 1928, and sold very well, being reprinted five times before the year-end.

The story Letters Patent in Yates' book Maiden Stakes refers to the plot and publishing of Perishable Goods and a letter received from an unhappy reader.

== Bibliography ==
- Smithers, AJ (1982). Dornford Yates. London: Hodder and Stoughton. ISBN 0-340-27547-2.
