= Lower than Vermin =

1950 novel by Dornford Yates

- 1950 dustjacket
- Author: Dornford Yates
- Genre: Novel
- Publisher: Ward Lock & Co
- Publication date: 1950
- Media type: Print
- Pages: 324

Lower than Vermin is a 1950 novel by the English author Dornford Yates (Cecil William Mercer). It was not a commercial success, dealing as it did with a vanished pre-war world of upper class characters that held little attraction to readers of the 1950s.

The title comes from a 1948 speech by Labour minister Aneurin Bevan in which he described the Conservative Party as "lower than vermin".

== Plot ==
The book deals with the history of a noble family from about the time of Victoria's Diamond Jubilee until after the Second World War, much of it related by the governess, Miss Carson.

== Background ==
Mercer was very much not in sympathy with the new post-war order, and having received many letters from readers asking him to write again of the "old days" he once again returned to his preferred period with this novel. He wrote to a correspondent, "What we used to call the nobility and gentry of England have been so monstrously misaligned and misrepresented for so long that I felt it was only right that some author of standing should present a true picture of them and their habits and manners before it was too late."

== Critical reception ==
Mercer's biographer AJ Smithers acknowledged "Mercer's mild obsession with the kind of people whom he ranked only a little lower than the angels." He noted that the author's ideas had been formed well before 1914 and they were never mitigated. By the time Mercer was thirty he "had seen a good cross-section of the gentry of England and ... he preserved it like a fly in amber."

The book was not a great success, appearing to a new generation of post-war readers to be a caricature completely divorced from present reality.

== Bibliography ==
- Smithers, AJ (1982). Dornford Yates. London: Hodder and Stoughton. ISBN 0-340-27547-2.
