= Ne'er-Do-Well =

1954 detective novel by Dornford Yates

- 1954 dustjacket
- Author: Dornford Yates
- Genre: Detective novel
- Publisher: Ward Lock & Co
- Publication date: 1954
- Media type: Print
- Pages: 222

Ne'er-Do-Well is a 1954 detective novel by the English author Dornford Yates (Cecil William Mercer), his only work of the genre. Although Richard Chandos narrates, the book is not generally classified as a 'Chandos' title.

== Plot ==
Superintendent Falcon investigates the murder of Lord St Amant at the village of Ne'er-do-Well. Much of the story is set in a convent.

== Critical reception ==
Mercer’s biographer AJ Smithers considered the novel to bear the marks of being written by an elderly and not over-robust man, being short on action and concentrating rather on states of mind. It was not a commercial success.

== Bibliography ==
- Smithers, AJ (1982). Dornford Yates. London: Hodder and Stoughton. ISBN 0-340-27547-2.
