= As Berry and I Were Saying =

1952 fictionalised memoirs of Dornford Yates

- First edition cover with publishers band
- Author: Dornford Yates
- Series: Berry books
- Genre: Fictionalised memoirs
- Publisher: Ward Lock & Co
- Publication date: 1952
- Media type: Print
- Pages: 286
- Preceded by: The Berry Scene
- Followed by: B-Berry and I Look Back

As Berry and I Were Saying is the first volume of fictionalised memoirs of the English author Dornford Yates (Cecil William Mercer), published in 1952 and featuring his recurring 'Berry' characters: Berry, Daphne, Boy and Jill. A second volume, B-Berry and I Look Back, was published in 1958.

== Contents ==
In an introductory note, the author states that those portions of the text that are a matter of fact are strictly true, and that he has told 'nothing but the truth'. He told an admirer that "the book is really my own memoir put into the mouths of Berry and Boy and so related in a fictional setting. I like to think that has made the book more palatable and less dull than an ordinary volume of reminiscences."

== Critical reception ==
According to Yates's biographer, AJ Smithers, "The book can by no stretch of the imagination be called an autobiography; rather it is a scrap-book of the Edwardian age as it was seen by the upper-middle or lower-upper classes. It is none the worse for that ... Real characters, and some thinly disguised abound; but in reading it one is hard put to distinguish the experiences of William Mercer and those of Boy Pleydell."

The memoirs have been called "denunciations of the changing times", and despite the claim to veracity in the introductory note are "highly subjective opinions on the past", with unhistorical episodes that "valorise the past at the expense of the post-war present".

== Bibliography ==
- Smithers, AJ (1982). Dornford Yates. London: Hodder and Stoughton. ISBN 0-340-27547-2.
