= Fire Below =

1930 adventure novel by Dornford Yates

- 1934 H&S dustjacket
- Author: Dornford Yates
- Series: Chandos books
- Genre: Novel
- Publisher: Hodder and Stoughton
- Publication date: 1930
- Media type: Print
- Pages: 320
- Preceded by: Blood Royal
- Followed by: She Fell Among Thieves

Fire Below is a 1930 adventure novel by the English author Dornford Yates (Cecil William Mercer), the fourth in his Chandos thriller series and a sequel to Blood Royal. The book was published in the US under the title By Royal Command.

== Plot ==
Chandos and Hanbury are lured back to the fictional Principality of Riechtenburg by a forged telegram.

== Background ==
In this novel, the author continued to mine ideas from Anthony Hope, specifically Rupert of Hentzau. Commenting in 1958 through his character Boy Pleydell, Mercer acknowledged resemblances between his work and that of Hope, particularly mentioning Fire Below and Blood Royal.

== Critical reception ==
The Chandos series had made the name of Dornford Yates widely known, and Fire Below was as received as eagerly when it appeared in June 1930 as his earlier Chandos books had been.

The original dustjacket included the following quotes -

- Frank Swinnerton in the Evening News - "It is tremendously competent, exciting and quick moving."
- John o' London's Weekly - "Mr. Dornford Yates adds another volume to the astounding adventures of Richard Chandos. The book is packed with rapid incident. Mr. Yates' invention is amazing- there is no other word for it...here Mr. Yates is at his very best."
- Queen - "Amazingly good."
- Yorkshire Post - Mr. Dornford Yates takes my breath away."

== Bibliography ==
- Smithers, AJ (1982). Dornford Yates. London: Hodder and Stoughton. ISBN 0-340-27547-2.
