= Anthony Lyveden =

1921 adventure novel by Dornford Yates

- 1925 dustjacket
- Author: Dornford Yates
- Genre: Novel
- Publisher: Ward Lock & Co
- Publication date: 1921
- Media type: Print
- Pages: 308
- Followed by: Valerie French

Anthony Lyveden is a 1921 adventure novel by the English author Dornford Yates (Cecil William Mercer). It was first published in monthly instalments in The Windsor Magazine. The book was Mercer's first attempt at a full-length novel, and was succeeded by Valerie French which continued the story of the main characters.

== Plot ==
Anthony Lyveden DSO, a destitute ex-officer, is forced to take a job as a footman at the Gramarye estate. The estate's owner, Colonel Winchester, becomes mad and leaves Lyveden in charge under a power of attorney. The situation drives Lyveden himself to madness.

== Background ==
The author was not a happy man at the time, his father having committed suicide early in 1921, and Mercer's biographer AJ Smithers reports a suggestion that at this date he was not far from suffering a nervous breakdown. He defied The Windsor Magazine's tradition that every episode should end with a lovers' meeting, though he was pressed hard by the magazine's editor.

== Chapters ==
Chapter	Book Title	Windsor Title	Date	Volume	Issue	Pages	Illustrator
I	The Way Of A Man	In The First Place	January 1921	LIII	313	101-116	Norah Schlegel
II	The Way Of A Maid	In The Second Place	February 1921	LIII	314	205-220	Norah Schlegel
III	The Voice Of The Turtle	In The Third Place	March 1921	LIII	315	311-324	Norah Schlegel
IV	The Golden Bowl	Livery Of Seisin	April 1921	LIII	316	411-425	Norah Schlegel
V	An High Look And A Proud Heart	A Month's Wages	May 1921	LIII	317	517-531	Norah Schlegel
VI	The Comfort Of Apples	Gramarye	June 1921	LIV	318	3-16	Norah Schlegel
VII	Nehustan	Grey Matter	July 1921	LIV	319	109-124	Norah Schlegel
VIII	The Power Of The Dog	Ex-Parte Motions	August 1921	LIV	320	223-239	Norah Schlegel
IX	Vanity Of Vanities	The Return Of The Spirit	September 1921	LIV	321	337-355	Norah Schlegel

== Illustrations ==
The illustrations from the Windsor stories by Norah Schlegel (1879-1963) were not included in the book version.

== Critical reception ==
Smithers considered Anthony Lyveden to be a book of varying quality, and too episodic to be truly called a novel. He criticised the characterisations, suggesting that a reader might with some justice think the hero a pompous prig, one of the young women a humourless, suspicious creature, and the other a trollop manquée.

== Bibliography ==
- Smithers, AJ (1982). Dornford Yates. London: Hodder and Stoughton. ISBN 0-340-27547-2.
