= Woman's Journal (British magazine) =

British monthly magazine, 1927–2001

- Categories: women
- Frequency: Monthly
- Founded: 1927; 99 years ago
- Final issue: 2001; 25 years ago
- Country: United Kingdom
- Language: English
- Website: www.thewomensjournal.co.uk

Woman's Journal was a monthly British magazine primarily targeted towards women readers, published from November 1927 to 2001. It contained a mix of contemporary fiction, beauty, fashion and stories about the royal family.

== Topics ==
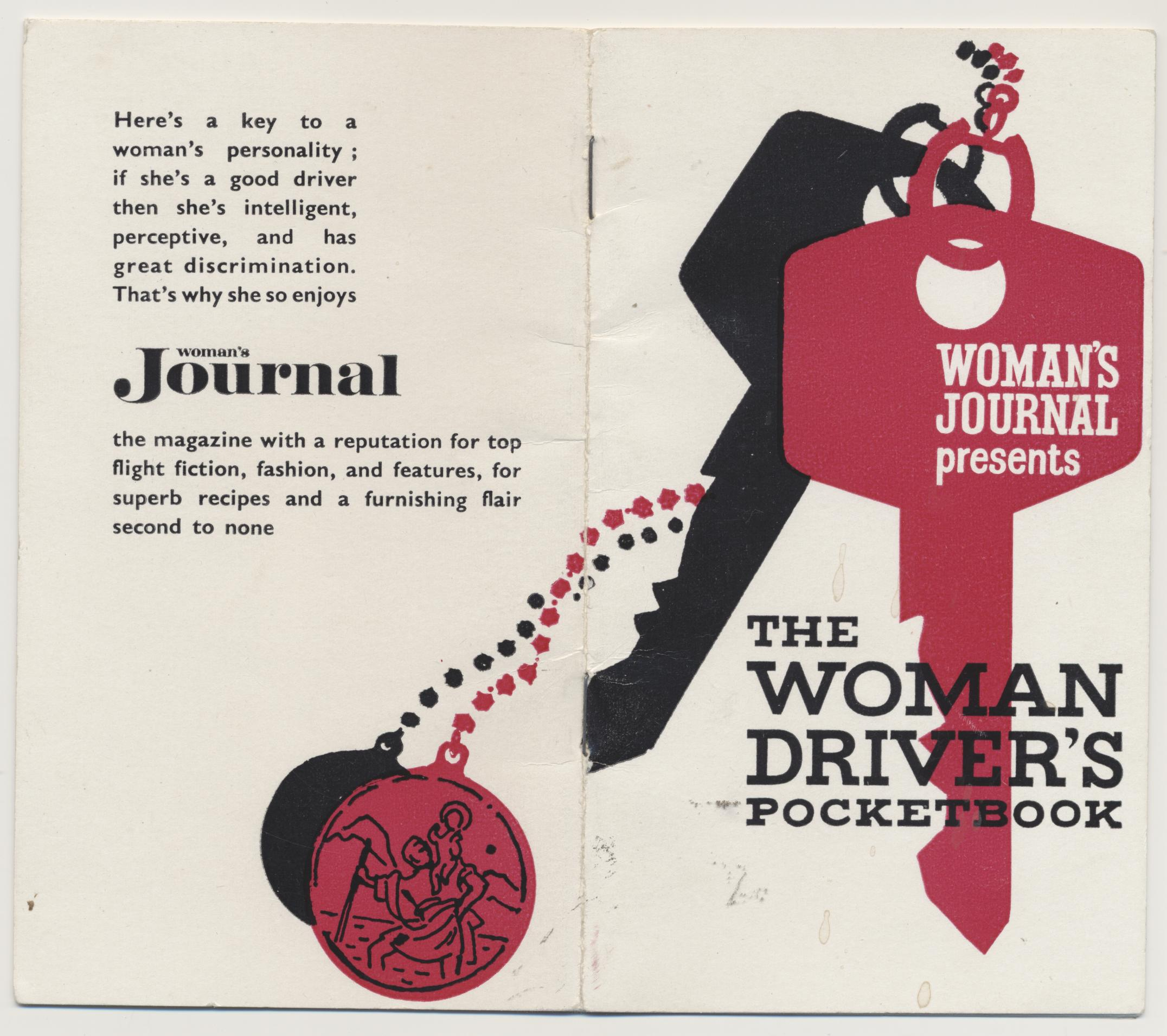
Woman's Journal Women Driver's Pocketbook

The magazine supported women's many interests, including publishing a Women Driver's Pocketbook in 1963, with useful tips and guidance on safe driving.

Among the writers contributing to its fiction pages were—

- Margery Allingham
- Leslie Charteris
- Agatha Christie
- Daphne Du Maurier
- John Galsworthy
- Elizabeth Goudge
- Fannie Heaslip Lea
- Georgette Heyer
- Ngaio Marsh
- Mary Stewart
- Elizabeth Von Armin
- H. G. Wells
- John Wyndham
- Dornford Yates

An early beauty editor was Jean Cleland (1895-1978).

== Online ==
The Woman's Journal was resurrected online in 2023 as The Women's Journal. The Women's Journal UK was relaunched to address contemporary women's issues.

== Editors ==
- Ailsa Garland (1965–1970)
- Marcelle d'Argy Smith (1997–1999)
- Elsa McAlonan (1999–2001)
- Jennifer Read-Dominguez (2023–date)
