= The Windsor Magazine =

UK magazine (1895–1939)

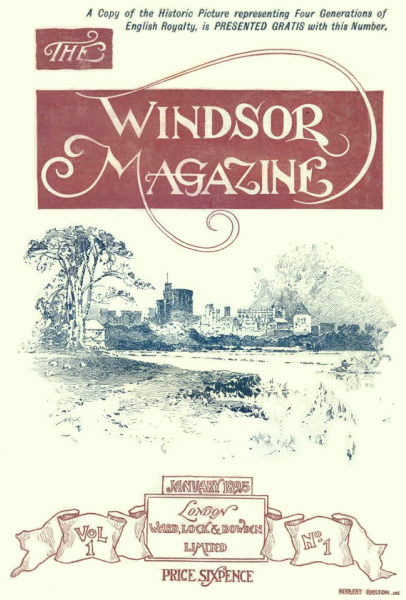
- Volume 1, Number 1 (January 1895)
- Frequency: Monthly
- First issue: January 1895
- Final issue Number: September 1939; 537
- Company: Ward, Lock & Co.
- Country: UK
- Language: English

The Windsor Magazine was a monthly illustrated publication produced by Ward, Lock & Co. from January 1895 to September 1939 (537 issues).

The title page described it as "An Illustrated Monthly for Men and Women".

It was bound as six-monthly volumes, with the exception of Volume IV and the final volume, LXXXX (XC).

== Cover designs ==
Until June 1917 the monthly magazine had a standard cover design, showing the title as "The Windsor Magazine", a sketch of Windsor Castle, and the volume number, month, and issue number in a panel at the foot. The December issues had this layout in colour, while the other months were on green paper with the magazine's name in a red block.

Possibly in connection with the royal family's decision to become the House of Windsor in July 1917, that month the magazine had a make-over, and the new covers dispensed with the sketch of Windsor Castle and the word "Magazine" and instead proclaimed it as "The July (August, September, October etc.) Windsor", with the issue and volume number shown below, and a different cover painting, usually featuring a young woman, each month. Subsequently, the issue and volume number disappeared from the front page, and while the issue number, month and year continued to appear on the spine, the volume number was no longer quoted externally. Latterly the subject of the cover paintings became more varied, while in the mid-1930s the word "Magazine" re-appeared on the front cover for a number of issues before again being dropped.

== Editors ==
- Stanhope W. Sprigg (January to December 1895)
- David Williamson (January 1896 to May 1898)
- Arthur Hutchinson (June 1898 to August 1927) – died 26 August 1927. aged 57
- Harry Golding (September 1927 to September 1939)

== Writers ==
Writers for the magazine included the following:

- Robert Barr
- Arnold Bennett
- Harold Bindloss
- Guy Boothby
- Leslie Charteris
- Arthur Conan Doyle
- Wyatt Earp
- Charlotte O'Conor Eccles
- Rider Haggard (whose Ayesha was serialised in 1904–05)
- Anthony Hope (whose Sophy of Kravonia was serialised in 1905–06)
- Jerome K. Jerome
- Rudyard Kipling (whose Stalky & Co. was serialised in 1898–99)
- Jack London
- Archibald Marshall
- L. T. Meade
- E. Nesbit
- Owen Oliver
- E. Phillips Oppenheim
- Barry Pain
- Max Pemberton
- Eden Phillpotts
- Jessie Pope
- Bertram Fletcher Robinson
- Horace Annesley Vachell
- Edgar Wallace
- Hugh Walpole
- Herbert Westbrook
- Fred M. White
- Mrs C. N. Williamson
- Dornford Yates (who first appeared in issue 201 dated September 1911 with the story, "The Busy Bees" and subsequently became a regular contributor to the magazine, providing 123 stories including "His Brother's Wife" which appeared in the final issue, 537, in September 1939).
- Israel Zangwill

== Artists ==
Artists whose illustrations were published in the magazine included the following:

- Salomon van Abbé
- Harold Copping
- Maurice Greiffenhagen
- George Wylie Hutchinson
- E G Oakdale
- Norah Schlegel (1879–1963) – born in Gateshead, daughter of Frederick, a Danish-born provisions importer
- Steven Spurrier
- George Cecil Wilmshurst (1873–1930) – born in Walton-on-the-Naze

The Windsor Magazine
| Volume # | | From | To | Issues From | To |
|---|---|---|---|---|---|
| 1 | I | January 1895 | June 1895 | 1 | 6 |
| 2 | II | July 1895 | December 1895 | 7 | 12 |
| 3 | III | January 1896 | June 1896 | 13 | 18 |
| 4 | IV | July 1896 | November 1896 | 19 | 23 |
| 5 | V | December 1896 | May 1897 | 24 | 29 |
| 6 | VI | June 1897 | November 1897 | 30 | 35 |
| 7 | VII | December 1897 | May 1898 | 36 | 41 |
| 8 | VIII | June 1898 | November 1898 | 42 | 47 |
| 9 | IX | December 1898 | May 1899 | 48 | 53 |
| 10 | X | June 1899 | November 1899 | 54 | 59 |
| 11 | XI | December 1899 | May 1900 | 60 | 65 |
| 12 | XII | June 1900 | November 1900 | 66 | 71 |

Volumes continued to run from December to May and June to November thereafter, except for the final volume, 90 (LXXXX or XC) which covered the last four issues, from June to September 1939.

On 13 September 1939 (12 days after the outbreak of the Second World War) The Times carried a news article stating "The proprietors and publishers of the Windsor Magazine announce that in the present difficult circumstances it has been decided to suspend publication as from the September number, just issued." Publication was never resumed.
