= Dornford Yates =

English writer and novelist (1885–1960)

Cecil William Mercer
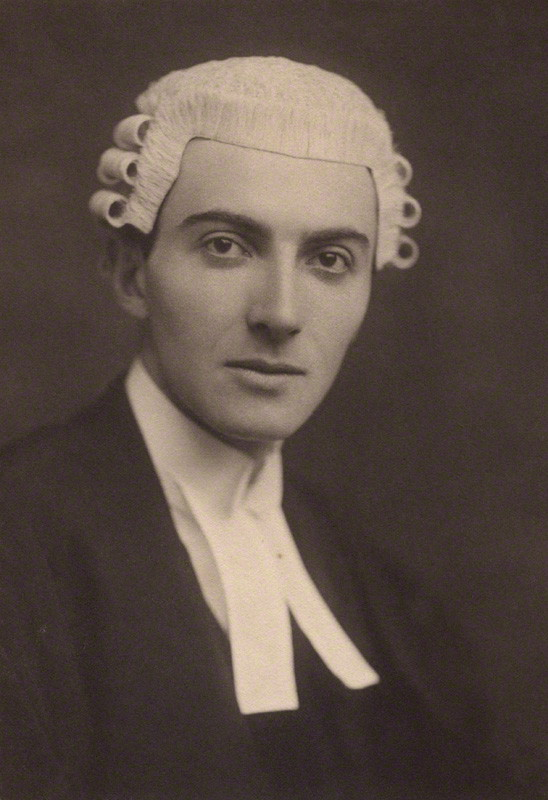
- Cecil William Mercer in 1909
- Born: 7 August 1885; Walmer, Kent, England
- Died: 5 March 1960 (aged 74); Umtali, Southern Rhodesia
- Education: University College, Oxford
- Occupation: Author
- Writing career
- Pen name: Dornford Yates
- Military career
- Allegiance: United Kingdom
- Branch: British Army
- Service years: 1914–1919
- Rank: Second Lieutenant
- Units: County of London Yeomanry
- Conflicts: World War I

Cecil William Mercer (7 August 1885 – 5 March 1960), known by his pen name Dornford Yates, was an English writer and novelist whose novels and short stories, some humorous (the Berry books), some thrillers (the Chandos books), were best-sellers during the Interwar Period.

The pen name Dornford Yates, first in print in 1910, resulted from combining the maiden names of his grandmothers – the paternal Eliza Mary Dornford, and the maternal Harriet Yates.

== Early life ==
William (Bill) Mercer was born in Walmer, Kent, the son of Cecil John Mercer (1850–1921) and Helen Wall (1858–1918). His father was a solicitor whose sister, Mary Frances, married Charles Augustus Munro; their son was Hector Hugh Munro (the writer Saki); Bill Mercer is said to have idolised his elder cousin.

Mercer attended St Clare preparatory school in Walmer from 1894 to 1899. The family moved from Kent to London when he joined Harrow School as a day pupil in 1899, his father selling his solicitor's practice in Kent and setting up office in Carey Street. Leaving Harrow in 1903, he attended University College, Oxford in 1904, where he achieved a Third in Law.

At university, he was active in the Oxford University Dramatic Society (OUDS), becoming secretary in 1906 and president in 1907, his final year. He acted in the 1905 production of Aristophanes’ The Clouds, of which the Times reviewer said: "Among individual actors the best was Mr. C. W. Mercer, whose 'Strepsiades' was full of fun, and who possesses real comic talent." After a small part in the 1906 production of Measure for Measure, in his final year, he appeared as 'Demetrius' in A Midsummer Night's Dream, and as 'Pedant' in The Taming of the Shrew, a production which included the professional actresses Lily Brayton as 'Katherine', and her sister Agnes as 'Bianca'.

Among the many useful friends Mercer made in the OUDS were Gervais Rentoul, who asked him to be his best man, and Lily Brayton's husband, actor Oscar Asche, later producer of the play Kismet, and writer of Chu Chin Chow. After university, Mercer took a caravanning holiday in Hampshire, with Asche, Lily, Agnes, and another theatrical couple, Matheson Lang and his wife, Hutin Britton; both Asche and Lang recall that holiday in their memoirs.

Mercer's third-class Oxford law degree was insufficient to gain him traditional access to the bar. However, in 1908 his father obtained his son a post as pupil to a prominent barrister, H. G. Muskett, whose practice often required his appearing in court on behalf of the police commissioner. As Muskett's pupil, Mercer saw much of the seedy side of London life, some of which is evident in his novels.

In 1909, he was called to the Bar where he worked for several years. In his first memoirs, As Berry & I Were Saying, he recalls his involvement in the trial of the poisoner Hawley Harvey Crippen, when he returned from acting with the Old Stagers, at Canterbury, to have first look at the legal brief. Mercer is in a photograph of the Bow Street Court committal proceedings, published in the Daily Mirror of 30 August 1910.

In his spare time, he wrote short stories that were published in Punch, The Harmsworth RED Magazine, Pearson's Magazine, and the Windsor Magazine, maintaining a relationship with this last until the end of the 1930s; after it closed he wrote for the Strand Magazine. He also assisted in the writing of What I Know (Mills & Boon, 1913) - US title King Edward As I Knew Him - the memoirs of C. W. Stamper, who had been motor engineer to King Edward VII.

== The Great War and afterwards ==
At the outbreak of the Great War in 1914, Mercer was commissioned as Second Lieutenant in the 3rd County of London Yeomanry (Sharpshooters), although his stories continued to appear in the Windsor until March 1915. In 1915, his regiment left for Egypt and, in November 1915 as part of the 8th Mounted Brigade, he was sent to the Salonika/Macedonian front where the war was in stalemate. Suffering severe muscular rheumatism he was sent home in 1917 and, although he was still in uniform, the War Office did not again post him. He eventually left the army in 1919. In June of that year the Windsor carried his first story since the end of the war.

Since 1914, the Mercer family home had been Elm Tree Road, behind the north-west side of Lord's Cricket Ground in St John's Wood, where his friends Oscar and Lily Asche were close neighbours. In autumn of 1919, he and Asche combined to write the stage show Eastward Ho!, but the production was not a great success and he did not again attempt to write for the stage. A frequent social – and then romantic – Elm Tree Road visitor was Bettine (Athalia) Stokes Edwards, an American girl who danced in Chu Chin Chow (and daughter of Robert Ewing Edwards of Philadelphia, Pennsylvania) who became Mercer's first wife. The New York Times announcement of their engagement (28 August 1919) states: "Mr & Mrs Glover Fitzhugh Perin of 57 West Fifty-eight street have announced the engagement of Mrs Perin’s oldest daughter Miss Bettine Stokes Edwards. . . ." suggesting that her father either was dead or divorced; her remarried mother then lived in New York City. Mercer and Bettine married at St James's, Spanish Place, in the Marylebone district of London, on 22 October 1919. The month of October also marked the appearance of a story in the Windsor called Valerie whose female lead made a living as a dancer; this story never appeared in book form.

Mercer decided not to return to the bar, and to concentrate on his writing. He and Bettine lived in Elm Tree Road, where their only child, Richard, was born on 20 July 1920. After the Great War, many ex-officers found that the rise in the cost of living in London precluded maintaining the style of life of a gentleman to which they had become accustomed; some looked beyond England. In 1922, the Mercers emigrated to France, where it was possible to live more cheaply, and where the climate was kinder to Mercer's muscular rheumatism.

== French residence ==
They chose the resort town Pau, in the western Pyrenees, in the Basses–Pyrénées département (now Pyrénées-Atlantiques) – where lived a sizeable British expat colony, but when the Mercers moved in is unknown. In Dornford Yates – A Biography (1982), A.J. Smithers reports "exactly how he hit upon the place is not clear", but Pau figures several times in the memoirs he is presumed to have ghost-written for C.W. Stamper, and so that might be the answer – "anywhere good enough for King Edward VII was good enough for him".

They rented the Villa Maryland, on Rue Forster, where Mercer proved an exacting husband, while Bettine was a social woman, and by 1929, the failure of their marriage was evident. Bettine had been indiscreet in her extra-marital romantic liaisons, and Mercer sued for divorce. Bettine did not defend, and the divorce was made absolute in September 1933. In the event, she returned to her family in the U.S.

Less than a year later, on 10 February 1934, at Chertsey Register office, Mercer married Doreen Elizabeth Lucie Bowie, whom he met on a cruise in 1932. She was the daughter of London solicitor David Mather Bowie of Virginia Water. Elizabeth was twenty years younger than her new husband, who felt he had met the incarnation of his fictional "Jill Mansel", thus did he call her "Jill" for the rest of his life. For him, Villa Maryland had many memories of Bettine, so he and Elizabeth decided to build a new house, named "Cockade". They chose a spot twenty-seven miles south of Pau, a little north-west of Eaux-Bonnes, on the road to the hamlet of Aas; the project is related in The House That Berry Built, wherein the name of the house is "Gracedieu" (God's Grace). They did not enjoy long residence in Cockade.

With France falling to the Wehrmacht in June 1940, the Mercers hurriedly arranged caretakers for Cockade, and then escaped the country – in company of visiting friends, Matheson Lang and wife – and traversed Spain en route to Portugal. They subsequently took ship for South Africa, arriving in Salisbury, Southern Rhodesia, in 1941.

== The Second World War and the Rhodesian years ==
C.W. Mercer was re-commissioned, this time in the Royal Rhodesian Regiment, and attained the rank of major. As the war concluded, the couple realised their plan of returning to Cockade – but were disappointed in the decrepitude of the house and the socially conscious, post-war attitude of their one-time servants. After some months, the Mercers obtained exit visas and returned to Umtali, Southern Rhodesia, (now Mutare, Zimbabwe), where they lived for the rest of his life. Mercer supervised the building of a replacement house for Cockade, another hillside venture, and, in 1948, they moved into "Sacradown", on Oak Avenue. The furniture in France was shipped to Rhodesia, as were the Waterloo Bridge balusters (see The House that Berry Built), which had never reached Cockade, but had been stored in England during the Second World War.

Cecil William Mercer died in March 1960.

== Writings ==
Mercer originally wrote short stories for the monthly magazines. His first known published work, Temporary Insanity, appeared in Punch in May 1910 – this is the first known occasion of his use of his pen name – and his second, Like A Tale That is Told appeared in the Red Magazine in July 1910. The first known 'Berry' story to be published, Babes in the Wood, appeared in Pearson's Magazine in September 1910. None of these early stories was ever included in his books. Many of his works began as stories in The Windsor Magazine, before being collected in book form by the Windsor's publishers, Ward Lock. Between September 1911 and September 1939 he had 123 stories published in the Windsor, and after it closed, the Strand Magazine carried three of his stories in 1940 and 1941. Four of his novels were serialised in Woman's Journal between 1933 and 1938. In the United States four of his novels were serialized in Woman's Home Companion between 1933 and 1939, while others appeared in The Saturday Evening Post and Blue Book.

His first story for The Windsor Magazine was "Busy Bees", in September 1911, and this and fourteen subsequent stories from that publication up to the July 1914 issue were republished in book form as The Brother of Daphne, in 1914. Some of the stories were edited for the book, to eliminate events, such as marriage, for the leading characters – which suggests that, originally, he had not planned on using the same characters for a story series. The narrator – later identified as "Boy Pleydell" – marries in "Babes in the Wood" and possibly in "Busy Bees", which became chapter VIII "The Busy Beers" in The Brother of Daphne, with the end of the story altered to remove the hint of marriage.

His second book, The Courts of Idleness, was published in 1920, containing material written before, during, and after the Great War. It was divided into three sections. In Book I Yates introduced a new set of characters similar to, but separate from, Berry & Co, in four stories that had appeared in the Windsor between December 1914 and March 1915, and a final story from the Windsor of June 1919 in which the male characters have their story lines resolved in Salonika, during the Great War. The Interlude has a story entitled "And The Other Left", from the November 1914 Windsor, which is set on the Western Front with a unique set of characters. Book II returns to the 'Berry' characters, with two pre-war stories from the August and September 1914 Windsor, and three post-war stories from the issues of July, August and September 1919. The book's final story, "Nemesis", was written for, but rejected by, Punch; subsequently, it appeared in the Windsor in November 1919, with the main character named "Jeremy"; for the book he became "Berry". "Nemesis" was written to the Punch length, and so is much shorter than most of the other stories in The Courts of Idleness.

The Berry books are semi-autobiographical, humorous romances, often in short story form, and, in particular, feature Bertram "Berry" Pleydell ("of White Ladies, in the County of Hampshire") and his family – his wife and cousin, Daphne, her brother, Boy Pleydell (the narrator), and their cousins Jonathan "Jonah" Mansel, and his sister, Jill. Collectively, they are "Berry & Co." Although all five appear in "Babes in the Wood", their precise relationships there are unstated, and Berry and Daphne are referred to as second cousins as late as Jonah & Co; later stories feature a simple family tree, showing them to be first cousins descended from two brothers and a sister.

"Berry & Co." capture the English upper classes of the Edwardian era, still self-assured, but affected by changing social attitudes and the decline of their fortunes. As in many of Yates' books, grand houses, powerful motor cars, and foreign travel feature prominently in the 'Berry' stories. In the 1950s, C.W. Mercer wrote two books of fictionalized memoirs, As Berry and I Were Saying and B-Berry and I Look Back, written as conversations between Berry and his family. They contain many anecdotes about his experiences as a lawyer, but are, in the main, an elegy for a past upper-class way of life.

The 'Chandos' books, starting with Blind Corner, in 1927, marked a change in style and content, being thrillers set mainly in Continental Europe (often in Carinthia, Austria), wherein the hero–narrator, Richard Chandos, and colleagues, including George Hanbury and Jonathan Mansel (who also featured in the 'Berry' books), tackle criminals, protect the innocent, woo beautiful ladies, and hunt for treasure. These were originally published by Hodder and Stoughton although later they were re-issued by Ward Lock. It is the 'Chandos' novels to which Alan Bennett especially refers in naming Dornford Yates in the play Forty Years On (1972): "Sapper, Buchan, Dornford Yates, practitioners in that school of Snobbery with Violence that runs like a thread of good-class tweed through twentieth-century literature." Yates also wrote other thrillers in the same style, but with different characters.

Despite the charm of the ‘Berry’ books, Yates appears to have regarded the thrillers as his better work:

”I knew that, if I tried, I could write better English than so far I had. But there didn’t seem to me to be much scope for good English in the light stuff I had been writing. And so I wrote Blind Corner. Of course I got stacks of letters, saying ‘Anybody can do stuff like Blind Corner, but nobody else can do your light stuff.’”

Besides these two genres, some of Yates' novels do not easily fall into either the humorous or the thriller category.

Anthony Lyveden was Dornford Yates's first novel, telling the story of an impoverished ex-officer. Originally, it was published in monthly instalments in The Windsor Magazine,

Valerie French, the sequel to Anthony Lyveden features mostly the same cast. At the start of the book Lyveden is suffering amnesia, and cannot recall the events of the previous book, leading to romantic complications.

The Stolen March is a fantasy set in a lost realm, between Spain and France, where travellers encounter characters from nursery rhymes and fairy tales. A planned sequel, The Tempered Wind, is referred to in the quasi-autobiography, B-Berry and I Look Back, where Yates mentions abandoning the book as it failed to "take charge".

This Publican features a scheming woman and her hen-pecked husband. Some critics have suggested that the portrayal of the villainess represented a thinly veiled attack on Mercer's first wife, although that could imply that the husband was a self-portrait, and as Smithers' states, "...he would hardly have held himself out in a character so feeble and flaccid."

Lower than Vermin is a novel in which the author defends his views on social class, and criticises the path Britain was following under the post-war Labour government; the title derives from a description of members of the Conservative Party given in a 1948 speech by Labour Party MP and government minister Aneurin Bevan.

Ne'er-Do-Well is a murder story narrated by Richard Chandos, with whom the investigating detective is staying.

Wife Apparent was Yates's last novel, set in 1956.

== Stage, cinema, and other media ==
The 1919 musical play Eastward Ho! was written by Oscar Asche (author) with lyrics by Dornford Yates and music by Grace Torrens and John Ansell. It was produced by Edward Laurillard and George Grossmith Jr., and opened at the Alhambra Theatre in London on 9 September and ran for 124 performances.

The BBC produced an adaptation of She Fell Among Thieves in 1977, featuring Malcolm McDowell as Chandos, Michael Jayston as Mansel, and Eileen Atkins as Vanity Fair. This adaptation was also used as the first episode of the US TV series Mystery! in 1980.

An episode of the ITV Hannay series, "A Point of Honour", was based on the eponymous short story published in The Brother of Daphne, but the source was uncredited.

An audiobook edition of Blind Corner, read by Alan Rickman, was produced by Chivers Audio Books.

== Related works ==
In 1948 Richard Usborne wrote an article entitled Ladies and Gentlemen v. Cads and Rotters about the works of Dornford Yates in Volume 3, Number 11 of The Windmill, a literary magazine. Yates was not pleased by the article, but nevertheless Usborne went on to write Clubland Heroes (1953; reprinted 1974 and 1983) in which he examined the work of Yates and two contemporary thriller writers, John Buchan and Sapper.

The 1973 novel Indecent Exposure by Tom Sharpe plays up the 'Englishman' that Dornford Yates created in his novels. There is a group of characters in the satirical novel who style themselves as the 'Dornford Yates' club and who try to emulate the 'Master' in avoiding reality and a changing world. Sharpe was later hired by the BBC to adapt She Fell Among Thieves for television, and used the same satirical approach.

In 1983 Sharpe wrote an introduction to a reprint of Yates' first Chandos thriller Blind Corner, one of a series issued by J.M.Dent & Sons under the title Classic Thrillers. Further Yates' books in the series were Perishable Goods, with an introduction by Richard Usborne; Blood Royal, with an introduction by A.J.Smithers; Fire Below; She Fell Among Thieves, with an introduction by Ion Trewin; Gale Warning; Cost Price; Red in the Morning; An Eye For a Tooth; and The Best of Berry, with an introduction by Jack Adrian.

Following the publication of Dornford Yates - A Biography in 1982, Smithers went on to write Combined Forces in 1983, subtitled "Being the Latter-Day adventures of Maj-Gen Sir Richard Hannay, Captain Hugh 'Bulldog' Drummond and Berry and Co", which has the heroes (and some villains) of Buchan, Sapper and Yates meeting up after World War Two and having further adventures together.

In 2015, Kate Macdonald published Novelists Against Social Change: Conservative Popular Fiction, 1920–1960, which examines the work of Buchan, Yates and Angela Thirkell.
