= Ward, Lock & Co. =

Publishing house in the United Kingdom

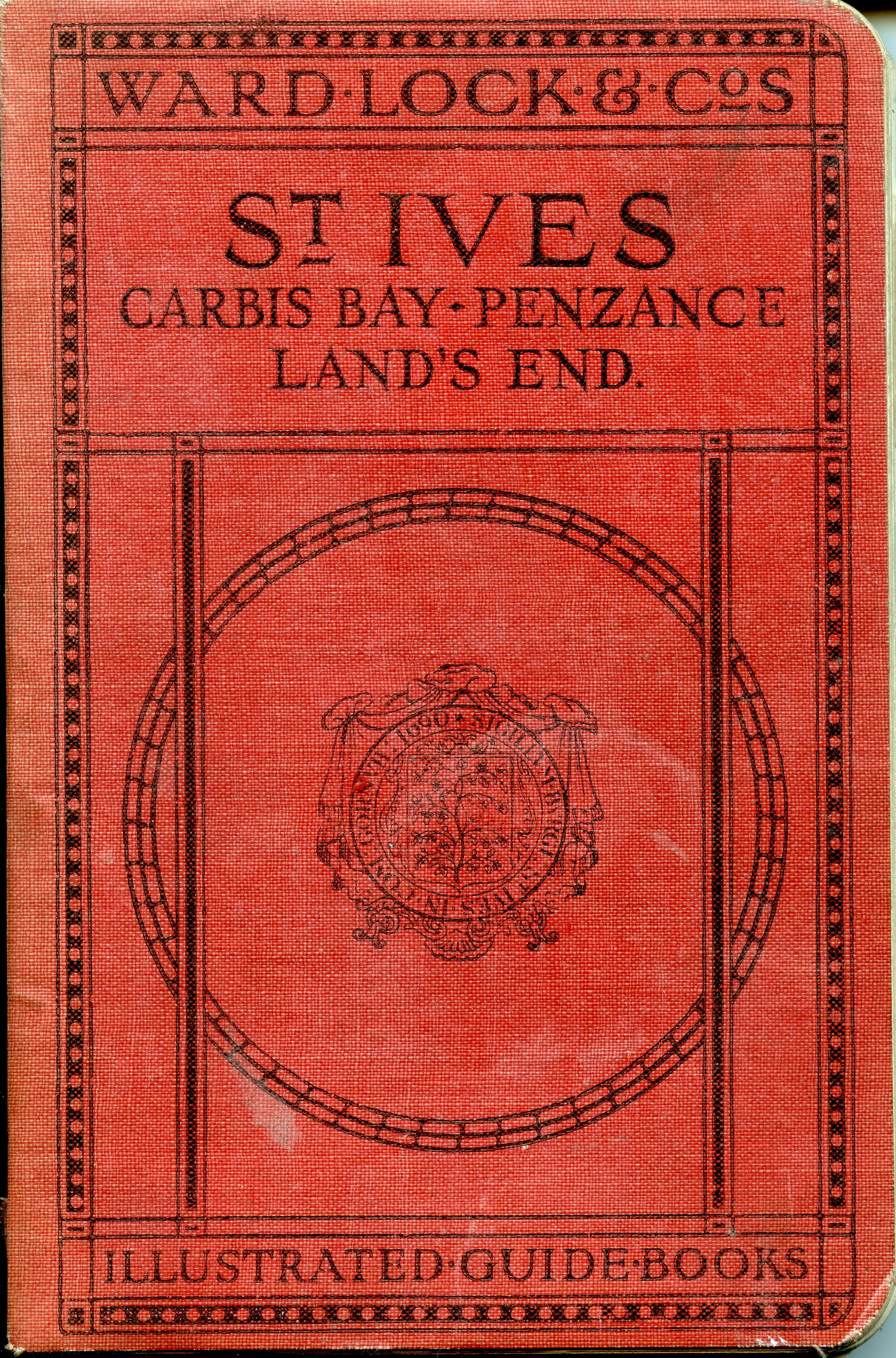
- Cover of "A Pictorial and Descriptive Guide to St Ives, Carbis Bay, Penzance, Land's End and the Isles of Scilly" (11th ed.). 1927.
- Founded: 1854; 172 years ago
- Founder: Ebenezer Ward and George Lock
- Successor: Orion Publishing Group
- Country of origin: United Kingdom
- Headquarters location: London
- Publication types: Books, magazines

Ward, Lock & Co. was a publishing house in the United Kingdom that started as a partnership and developed until it was eventually absorbed into the publishing combine of Orion Publishing Group.

== History ==
Ebenezer Ward and George Lock started a publishing concern in 1854 which became known as "Ward and Lock". Based originally in Fleet Street, London it outgrew its offices and in 1878 moved completely to Salisbury Square, London.

The firm's first office was at 158 Fleet Street. Fleet Street had an inviting architecture and atmosphere. It was full of businesses and people, coffee houses, taverns, and soup kitchens. It appealed to "publishers, printers, authors and tradesmen who occupied its houses and frequented its taverns." And it was always bustling with "innumerable trades, tradesmen and customers, coaches, wagons playhouses".

Before founding Ward and Lock, Ward had worked as the manager of the book department at Herbert Ingram and Company. In 1855, Herbert Ingram and Company folded and Ward and Lock, with some help from their business partners Thomas Dixon Galpin and George William Petter, bought some of Ingram's "publications, including the copyrights, wood-blocks, stereotype plates and engravings [that] were put up for sale." Perhaps, the most important book from the Ingram catalogue was Webster's Dictionary of the English Language, which Ward and Lock started reissuing with great success. By the 1870s, Webster's Dictionary had sold 140,000 copies. Other titles published by Ward and Lock around this time included books on travel, mechanics, and reprints of classical works, such as Homer's Odyssey and Alexandre Dumas' Pictures of Travel in the South of France. By 1861, Ward and Lock had achieved enough success to be able to afford more staff and move into a new office at Amen Corner on Paternoster Row.

When Ward and Lock established their office in Paternoster Row it was already the home of "some of the most famous publishers in the country": Rivington, Longman, William Blackwood and Nelsons were some of the famous publishers with offices in the neighborhood. Ward and Lock continued to publish books at popular prices and started to issue atlases. Some of the authors the company published included Mary Elizabeth Braddon, Charles Reade and George Augustus Sala. With the help of Ward and Lock, Sala had, in 1860, started a magazine called Temple Bar – a "London magazine for Town and Country Readers". The magazine became very famous and in response to public demand, Ward and Lock published it in volume form, the first volume appearing in 1861.

Charles T. Tyler joined Ward and Lock as a partner in 1865 and the firm became Ward, Lock and Tyler. Tyler seems to have brought capital to the company and was a financial adviser. "Tyler remained with the firm for eight years, ceasing to be a partner in 1873, when it reverted to Ward and Lock."

In 1866, London publisher Samuel Orchart Beeton was obliged (as a result of the financial Panic of 1866) to sell his titles and name to Ward Lock; this gave them the rights to his late wife's Mrs Beeton's Book of Household Management.

In 1870, Ward, Lock and Tyler acquired E. Moxon, Son and Company. Moxon was a publishing firm that had published Charles Lamb, William Wordsworth, Alfred, Lord Tennyson, Robert Browning, Robert Southey, Benjamin Disraeli and a successful volume of poems illustrated by J. M. W. Turner and Thomas Stothard. The firm was led by Edward Moxon who was an influential poet and publisher, who had died in 1858. By buying the works published by Moxon and Beeton, Ward, Lock and Tyler expanded their connections with many famous poets and authors of the time.

In 1873, Tyler left the company and it reverted to being Ward and Lock. Ward and Lock's catalogue was now extensive. The acquisition of Moxon meant that the firm had "the right to publish the Poet Laureate's works" and they published Tennyson's collected poems. The company's staff was now expanding and hence, in 1878, they built a new office called Warwick House. They published a lot of cheap reprints from here, as well as prize books for school in the 1880s. To cope with the demand of cheap reprints and prize books, the firm set up their own binding works on the top floor of Warwick House.

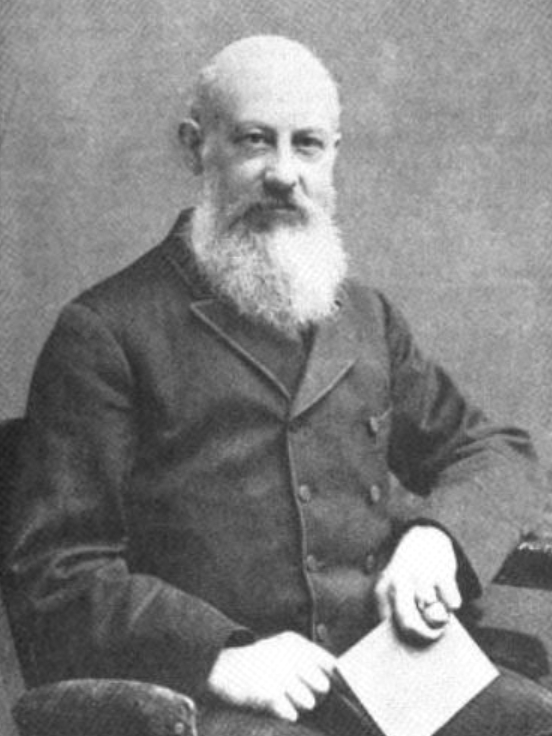
John Lock

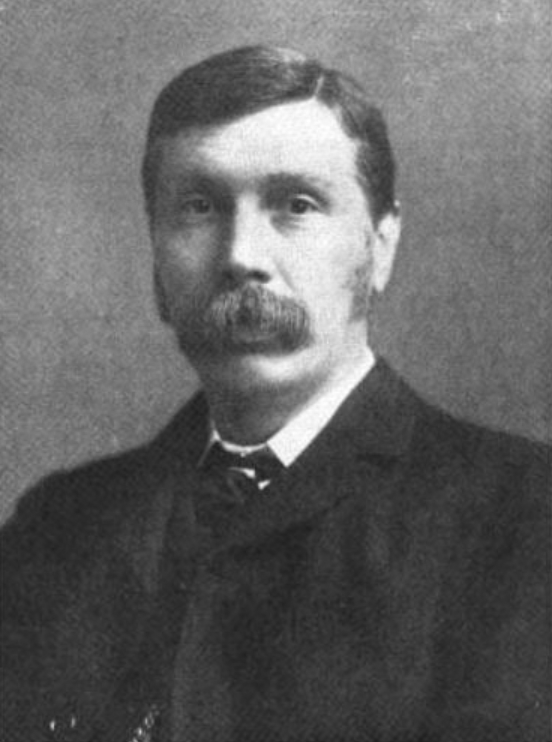
James Bowden

In 1882, Ward and Lock started expanding to English-speaking markets in other countries. In 1882 offices were opened in New York City, and in 1884 in Melbourne. In 1885, Ward and Lock purchased WH Smith's popular "Select Library of Fiction" series. In 1891, James Bowden came in to a three-way partnership. He had started working at Ward and Lock in 1869 and after he became a partner, the company became Ward, Lock and Bowden. "By the last decade on the 19th century, Messrs. Ward, Lock and Bowden were an important name on the publishing scene."

Ebenezer Ward retired in 1883 and died in 1902. George Lock had died in 1891. None of Ward's children went into business. But Lock's family continued the business. "After George Lock's death the firm was carried on for two years by James Bowden and John Lock under the title of Ward Lock, Bowden & Company. Then, in 1893, it was converted into a limited company with the title of Ward Lock and Bowden Ltd."

In the 1887 Beeton's Christmas Annual (published in November) Arthur Conan Doyle's first detective novel, A Study in Scarlet, was published, introducing the consulting detective Sherlock Holmes and his friend and chronicler Dr. Watson.

Ward Lock and Bowden's business in New York and Melbourne were doing well and in the mid-1890s, the company opened an office in Toronto, Canada; however, this was closed in 1919. The books published by the firm reflected the changes in English life. These included Oscar Wilde's The Picture of Dorian Gray, George Meredith's The Tragic Comedians, Joseph Hocking's All Men are Liars, Guy Boothby's In Strange Company and George Hutchinson's Winning a Wife in Australia. Besides fiction, the firm also published educational material. They were involved in "popularizing general and specialized knowledge", publishing material such as Illustrated History of the World, Self-culture for All, The World's Inhabitants, Worthies of the World and more.

Responding to the growth in railway lines and love for travel, Ward Lock and Bowden introduced their series of guides books to the British Isles in 1896. They were priced at a shilling. As of 1954, some 136 Ward Lock travel guides, also known as Red Guides, existed. In 1900, the firm bought A.D. Innes and Company – famous for publishing sports books.

In 1895, the company launched The Windsor Magazine – it introduced to the public a new style of magazine, that was for everyone, not just the upper or upper-middle classes. The magazine continued for nearly 45 years. The Windsor Magazine published novels in installments and also verse and was one of the firm's biggest successes.

James Bowden retired in 1897. By 1901, the firm went by Ward, Lock & Co., Limited. Its motto was "full steam ahead". The firm published major authors, but also took a "middle-brow" approach to fiction. They published in book form the novels of authors which had been published in installments in The Windsor Magazine. In 1909, the Melbourne office celebrated 25 years. In 1911, a fire destroyed large parts of Warwick House, but by 1913, a new Warwick House was built, which was larger than the earlier establishment. In 1914, the firm celebrated their Diamond Jubilee. In the 1920s, the firm expanded its list of juvenile literature to children's fiction and coloring books. They also continued to publish crime and detective stories, with books by authors like E. Phillips Oppenheim, Edgar Wallace and Leslie Charteris. Dornford Yates was one of Ward, Lock's most popular authors around this time. Around this time, Ward, Lock also published Mary Grant Bruce's highly successful Billabong series of books, starting with A Little Bush Maid in 1911.

The period between the two World Wars was tough on publishers. Warwick House was bombed twice during World War II, the second time, the building was almost completely destroyed. The firm temporarily relocated to Unilever House on the Embankment, before moving into an office in Salisbury Square. In 1946, Ward, Lock and Company moved into an office in 6, Chancery Lane. They also maintained offices at Norfolk Street, New Court, and Salisbury Square.

In 1964, the business split in two, creating Ward Lock Educational Company Limited, which "published school text books and books for teachers" and Ward Lock Limited which "published a general list". The latter was bought by Cassell Publishing in 1989. By the early 1990s, Cassell was acquired by the current owner, Orion Publishing Group.

== Trading names ==
- Ward and Lock – 1852 to 1891
- Ward, Lock & Tyler — 1862 to 1873
- Ward, Lock and Bowden Company – 1891 to 1893
- Ward Lock and Bowden Ltd. – 1893 to 1897
- Ward, Lock & Co., Limited – 1897 to present

== Authors ==
- Jules Verne
- Andrew Forrester
- Daniel Defoe
- R. M. Ballantyne
- Isabella Beeton
- Edward Bulwer-Lytton
- Leslie Charteris
- Thomas Hughes
- Nigel Tranter: early novels (1937–1956) and westerns (published under the pseudonym 'Nye Tredgold', 1950–1958)
- Dornford Yates
- Oscar Wilde
- Lewis Carroll
- E. Phillips Oppenheim
- Charles Darwin, M.A., F.R.S.
- Ottwell Binns

== Titles ==
Some famous books were published by Ward Lock:

- Among The Cannibals by Jules Verne
- "Robinson Crusoe" by Daniel Defoe
- Alice's Adventures in Wonderland by Lewis Carroll
- A Study in Scarlet
- Martin Rattler by R. M. Ballantyne (reprint)
- Meet the Tiger (the first book featuring The Saint)
- Mrs Beeton's Book of Household Management
- The Picture of Dorian Gray by Oscar Wilde
- Pilgrim's Progress (reprint)
- Seven Little Australians
- Bettany, George Thomas (1888). The World's Inhabitants, Or Mankind, Animals, and Plants: Being a Popular Account of the Races and Nations of Mankind, Past and Present and the Animals and Plants Inhabiting the Great Continents and Principal Islands. Ward, Lock.
- Tom Brown's School Days by Thomas Hughes
- Harold, the Last of the Saxons by Edward Bulwer-Lytton (3rd edition)
- A Daughter of the Marionis (1895) by E Phillips Oppenheim
- Darwin's Voyage in the Beagle (Ninth Edition, 1890)
- Grammar Made Gay by Winifred Watson
- Flight of Dutchmen by Nigel Tranter

The Windsor Magazine was published monthly from January 1895 until September 1939 (537 issues).

== Book series ==
- Amateur Work, Illustrated
- The Bedtime Books
- Beeton's "All About It" Books
- Beeton's Good-Aim Series
- Beeton's Boys' Own Books (also known as: Beeton's Boys' Own Library)
- Beeton's Humorous Books
- Beeton's Country Books
- Beeton's Penny Children's Books
- Beeton's Boys' Prize Library
- Beeton's Legal Handbooks
- Beeton's National Reference Books for the People of Great Britain and Ireland
- Beeton's Penny Books
- Billabong Books (also known as: Billabong Series)
- Blair's and Wilson's Catechisms
- The Boys' Favourite Library
- Captain Crawley's Shilling Handbooks
- Charles Reade's Novels
- Cobbin's Commentaries
- The Christian Life Series
- Concorde Gardening Books
- The Country House Library
- Drawing and Mechanical Books
- Every-day Handbooks
- "Every Man His Own Mechanic" Series
- Fair Britain
- Favourite Authors, British and Foreign
- The Family Gift Series
- The Friendly Counsel Series
- The Girls' Favourite Library
- The "Good Hand" Copy Books
- The Good Tone Library
- The Good Worth Library
- Goubard's Needlework Books
- Home Treasure Library
- The "How" Handbooks
- The Lady's Bazaar and Fancy-Fair Books
- Library Editions of Standard Works
- Library of Favourite Authors
- The Lily Series
- Little "Cousin" Series (author: Mary Hazelton Wade)
- The Little Wonder Books
- Lives Series (Ward Lock Educational)
- Madame Goubard's Needlework Instruction Books
- Madame Goubard's Shilling Needlework Books
- The "Manners" Series
- The Minerva Library of Famous Books
- The Model-Making Series
- New Sixpenny Series of Outdoor Booksc
- "Our Little Ones'" Library
- Moxon's Popular Poets
- The Pansy Series
- The People's Standard Library
- Popular Gift Series
- Prince Charming Colour Books for Children
- Prize Library
- The Rainbow Series
- The Rose Library
- Run and Read Library
- The Select Library of Fiction
- Series of the Great Poets
- Shilling Useful Books
- 6d. Copyright Novels
- The Standard Cookery Books
- The Standard Dictionaries of Language
- The Standard Etiquette Books
- The Standard Gardening Books
- The Standard Needlework Books
- The Sunshine Series
- Sylvia's Home Help Series
- Sylvia's New Needlework Books
- Tegg's Spelling Books
- Things To Do
- Useful Books
- Ward, Lock and Co.'s Library of Popular Sixpenny Books
- Ward, Lock and Co.'s Science Primers
- Ward, Lock and Co.'s Sevenpenny Net Novels
- Ward, Lock and Co.'s Warwick House Toy Books
- Ward & Lock's Country Life Books
- Ward & Lock's Educational Series
- Ward & Lock's Long Life Series
- Ward and Lock's Shilling Volume Library
- Ward & Lock's Ready Guides and Handbooks for Tourists
- Ward & Locks's Tourist's Pictorial Guide Books (also known as the Red Guides)
- Windsor Library
- Wonder Books Series
- World Library
- The Young Ladies' Library
- The Youth's Library of Wonders and Adventures

=== Geikie's School Series ===
- Geikie's Reading Books
- Geikie's Spelling Books
- Geikie's English School Classics
- Geikie's Poetry Books
- Geikie's Prize Copy Books

=== Ward & Lock's Penny Books for the People ===
- I. Ward & Lock's Penny Educational & Useful Series
- II. Ward & Lock's Penny Children's Books
- III. Kirton's Penny Temperance Books
- IV. Kirton's Penny Reciters and Dialogues
- V. Ward & Lock's Penny Shakespeare for the People
- VI. Ward & Lock's Penny Biographical Series
- VII. Ward & Lock's Penny Historical Series
- VIII. Kirton's "Cheerful Home" Tracts
- IX. Stepping Stones to Thrift
- X. Ward & Lock's Fireside Tracts
- XI. Anecdote, Wit, and Humour Series
