= Kettle River (St. Croix River tributary) =

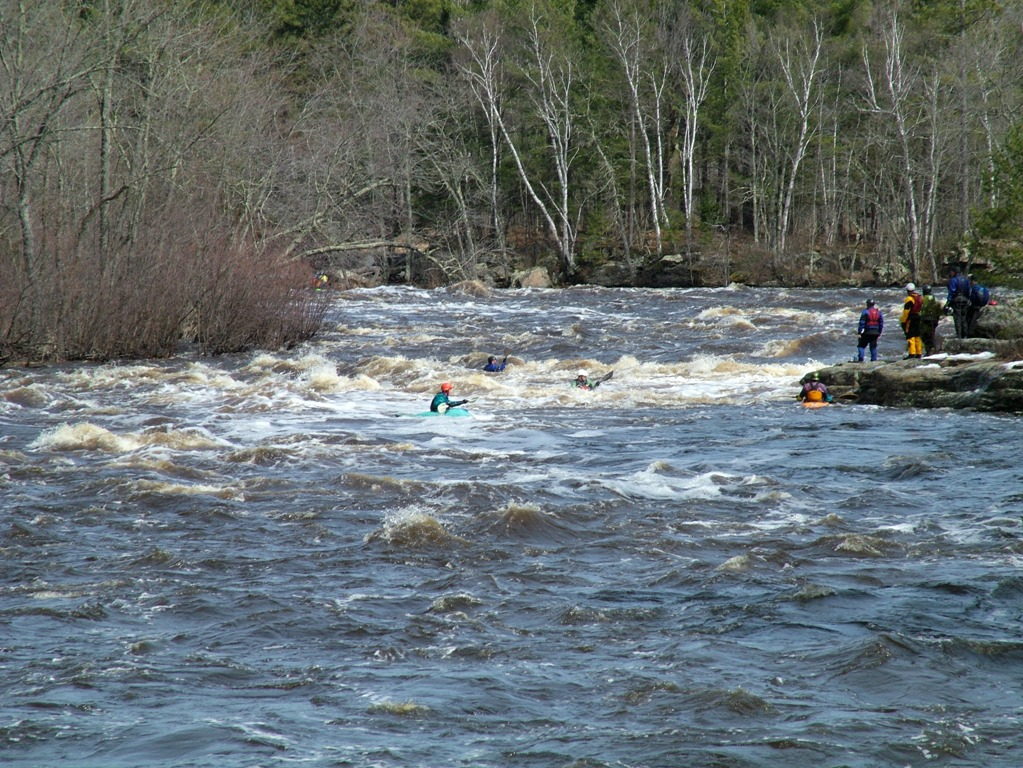
- Kayakers on the Kettle River in Banning State Park

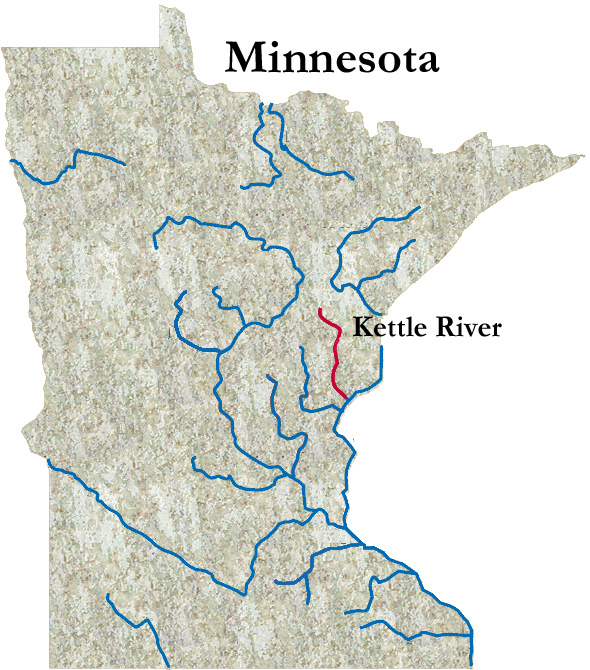
- The Kettle River

- Mouth of the Kettle River
- Native name: Akiko-ziibi (Ojibwe)

Location
- Country: United States
- State: Minnesota
- County: Carlton County, Pine County

Physical characteristics
- Source
  - coordinates: 46.6871686°N 92.7879778°W
- Mouth
  - coordinates: 45.8577304°N 92.7363141°W
- Length: 83.6 mi-long (134.5 km)

Basin features
- River system: St. Croix River

The Kettle River is an 83.6-mile-long (134.5 km) tributary of the St. Croix River in eastern Minnesota in the United States. Via the St. Croix River, it is part of the watershed of the Mississippi River. The river's English name is due to the large number of large rounded holes (kettles) in the sandstone in and around the river, carved out by the swirling waters of the river. The river's Dakota name Céġa watpa entered into English via the Anishinaabe people's Akiko-ziibi, both meaning "Kettle River".

== River character ==
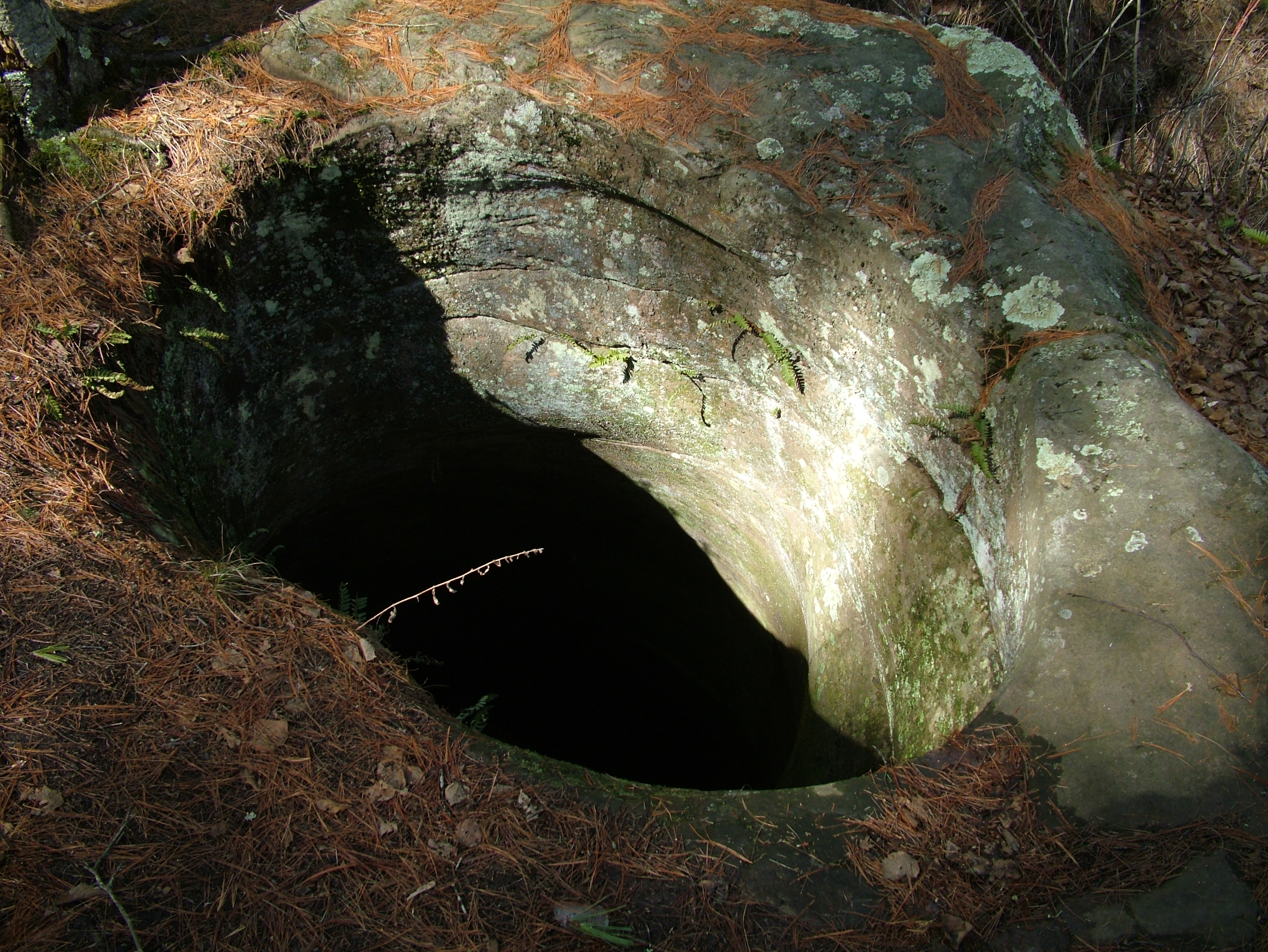
A kettle in Banning State Park

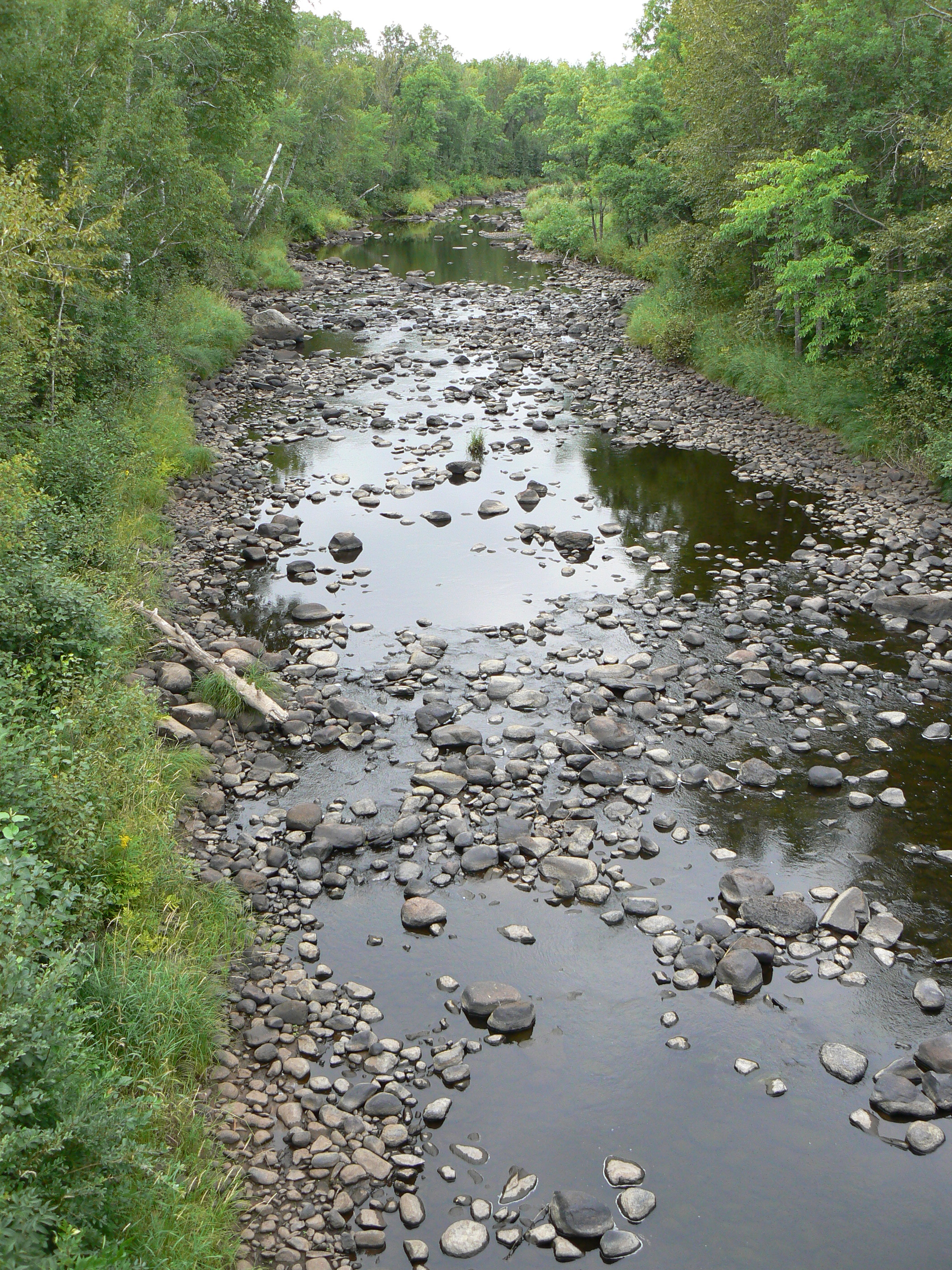
Far upper section of the Kettle River during low water.

Throughout the course of the river, the waters of the Kettle River have an amber tint. This tint comes from tannins (leaf colorings) from wetlands which drain into the river, rather than manmade causes.

The Kettle River's flow changes fairly quickly with rainfall in the area of drainage, which is about 1,060 square miles (2,750 km^{2}). It is not uncommon for the river to be reduced to a trickle during dry summer spells, and rise to a whitewater torrent after a few days of rain. Normal water flows vary seasonally from 200 to over 6000 ft^{3}/sec (0.09 to 2.8 m^{3}/s). Check the USGS Water Gauge for current flows before you go. At this station, the river flow averages around 724 cubic feet per second.

Very deep sections of the river exist, with some pools reaching over 100 feet (30 m) in depth. The astounding depth of the river and general good water quality support a population of the ancient sturgeon. Up until May 2018, the record largest fish ever caught in the state of Minnesota was a 70-inch (1.8 m), 94 pound 4 oz (42.8 kg) sturgeon caught in the Kettle River in 1994. This record was bested by a 73-inch sturgeon weighing roughly 105 lbs. caught in the Rainy River.

== Sections of river ==
The upper section of the river (above Banning State Park) is generally quick moving with frequent riffles and a few class I rapids. This section of the river is runnable when water levels are moderate to high (900 ft^{3}/sec).

As the river flows to Banning State Park, its character quickly changes as the river drops through a series of rapids ranging from class I to class IV. These rapids are easily runnable in an open canoe when water levels are low to moderate (600 to 900 ft^{3}/sec), but can become dangerous to even experienced whitewater kayakers and rafters during very high water (4,500 ft^{3}/sec). The steep rocky sides to the river, and undercut banks and kettles, can make a rescue very difficult in these conditions.

Shortly after exiting the park, the river quiets significantly before Big Spring Falls. The falls was recreated in 1995 when a dam built in 1908 was removed to help restore the river. The removal of the dam has allowed the sturgeon a greater range on the river. There is a small picnic area next to the falls, and a bit of a rough portage down to the water.

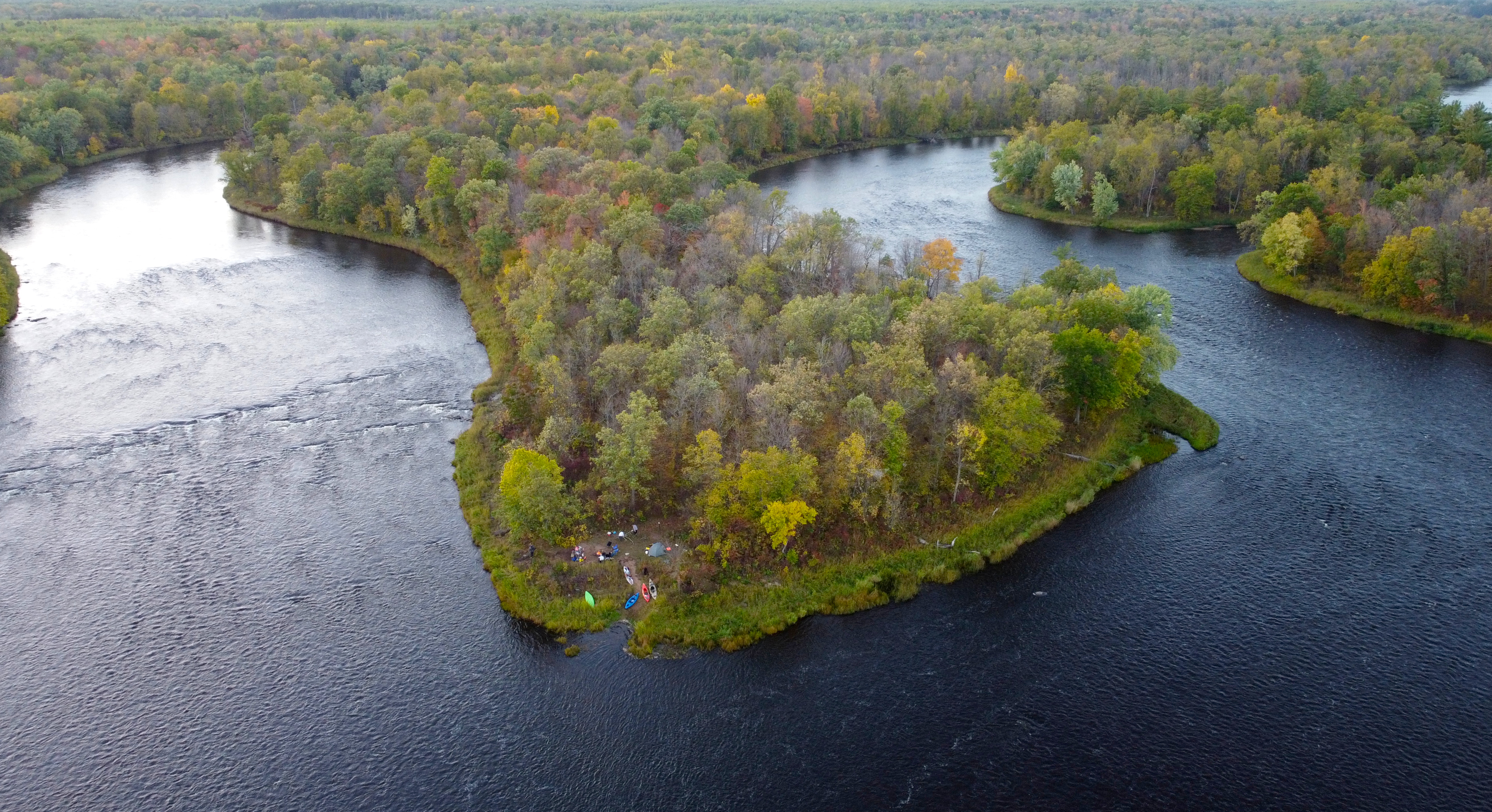
Campsite at the Kettle River at the confluence of the St Croix River

From the falls to the confluence of the St. Croix, the Kettle River continues to drop at a moderate rate with frequent riffles and occasional class I rapids. The rapids increase in frequency, but not intensity as the river approaches the St. Croix. This last section of the river is some of the best canoeing available in the state with manageable rapids, good fishing, frequent wildlife sightings (including bears) and absence of other people.

== Tributaries ==
The Kettle River flows into the St. Croix River 10 miles (16 km) east-northeast of Pine City.

Near its headwaters the river collects the West Branch Kettle River, which flows southeastwardly from its source near Wright. Other tributaries include the Dead Moose and Split Rock rivers, which join the Kettle in Carlton County, and the Moose Horn, Willow, Pine and Grindstone rivers, which join it in Pine County. Wolf Creek, in Banning State Park, drops over a 12-foot (3.7 m) waterfall just before it enters the Kettle River.

== History ==
Artists Clara Mairs and Clement Haupers frequented the Kettle River, and created paintings of the people and landscape.

== See also ==
- List of rivers of Minnesota
- St. Croix State Park
