= Norrish House =

Historic house in Minnesota, United States

- U.S. Historic district – Contributing property
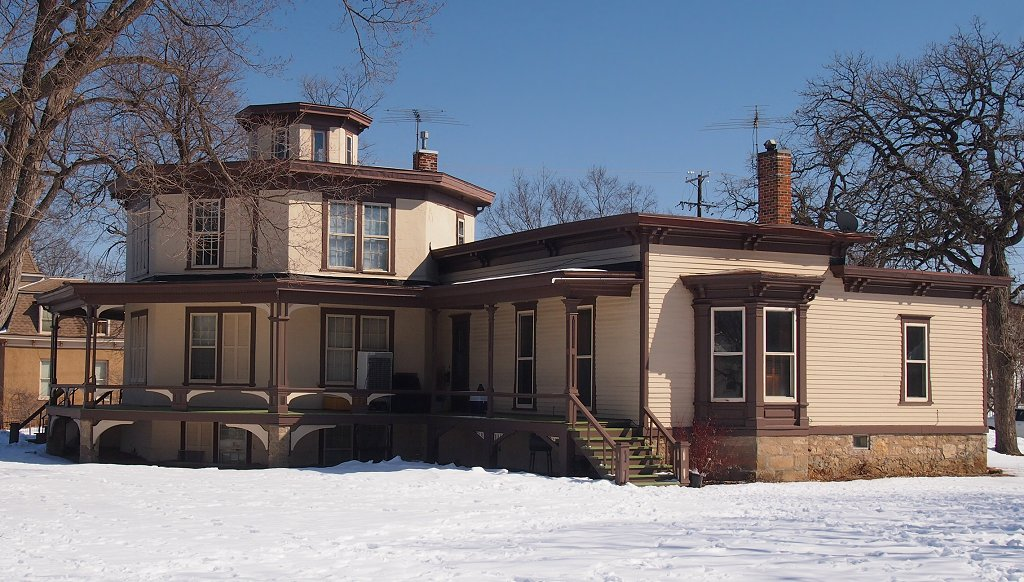
- The Norrish House from the northwest

- Location within Minnesota Location within the United States
- Interactive map showing the location of Norrish House
- Location: Hastings, Minnesota
- Coordinates: 44°44′38.21″N 92°51′19.33″W
- Built: 1857-1858
- Architectural style: Octagonal
- Part of: West Second Street Residential Historic District (ID78003072)
- Designated CP: July 31, 1978

The Claflin-Norrish House is a historic octagonal house located in Hastings, Minnesota, United States; a contributing property to the West Second Street Residential Historic District. The two-story home was built of limestone covered with stucco. Special features include a windowed cupola and wrap-around porch. It still stands at Spring and West 2nd Streets. It is one of scores of eight-sided homes built in the antebellum United States.

Originally built for the Clafflin family, John F. Norris purchased the house in the late 19th century. After the mid-1940s, the house was remodeled into 5 unit apartments. It was bought by John and Lorena Phelps and has been going through renovation to make it a single family house.
