= Mairs =

Mairs is a surname. Notable people with the surname include:

- Clara Mairs (1878–1963), American painter and printmaker
- Gregory Mairs (born 1994), British badminton player
- Nancy Mairs (1943–2016), American author

== See also ==
- Mair (surname)
- Mars (surname)
