= Hastings Rail Bridge =

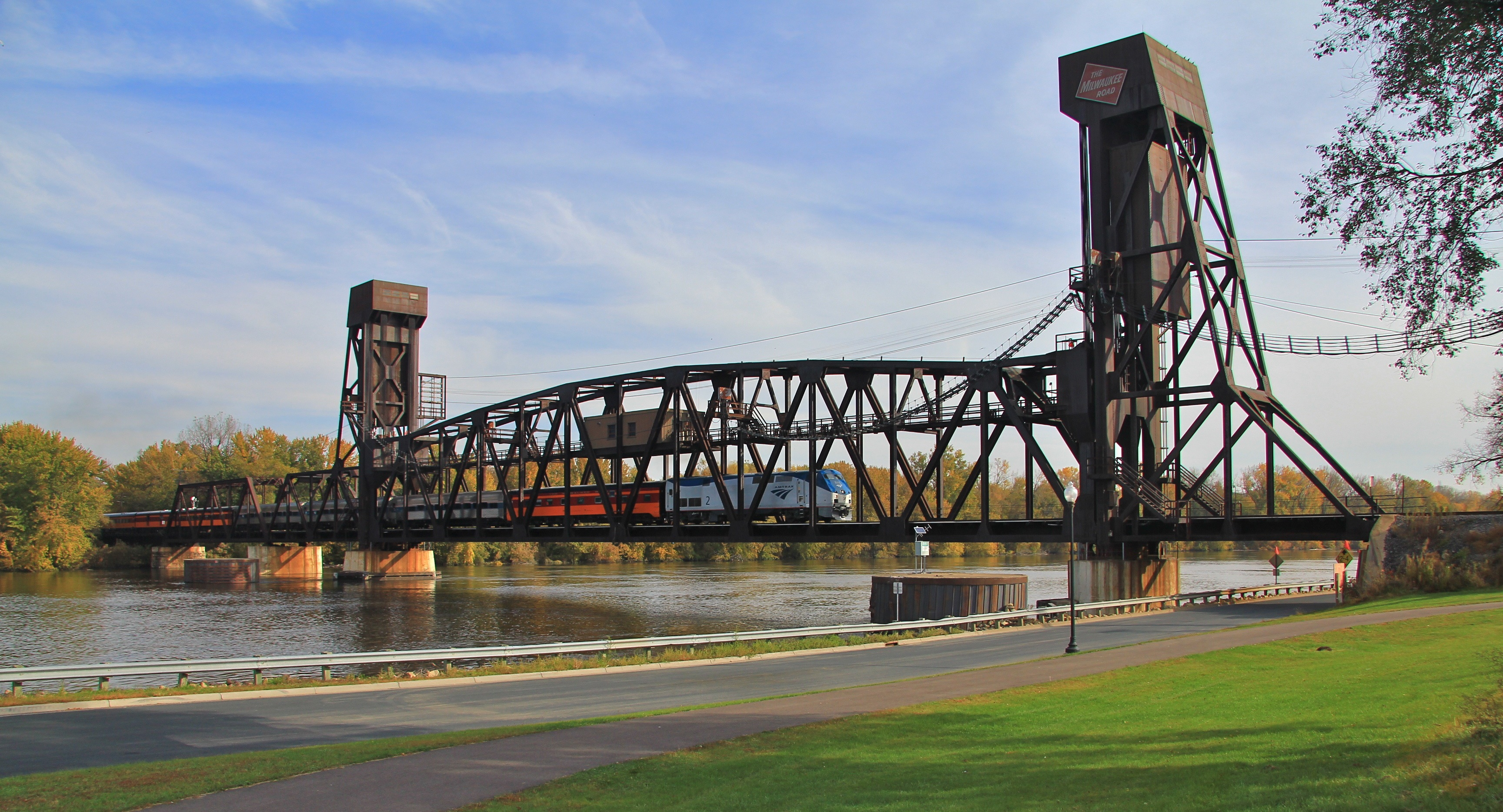
- A special-excursion passenger train crossing the bridge in 2010.
- Coordinates: 44°44′48″N 92°50′52″W
- Carries: Canadian Pacific Railway and the Amtrak Empire Builder
- Crosses: Mississippi River
- Locale: Hastings, Minnesota
- Maintained by: Canadian Pacific Railway
- ID number: L-268

Characteristics
- Design: Lift bridge
- Total length: 1,755 feet (535 m)
- Longest span: 324 feet (99 m)
- Clearance below: 60 feet (18 m) (span lifted), 21.9 feet (6.7 m) (span down)

Rail characteristics
- No. of tracks: 1

History
- Opened: 1981

Statistics
- Daily traffic: 20.0 trains per day (as of 2014)

Location
- Interactive map of Hastings Rail Bridge

Hastings Rail Bridge is a vertical-lift bridge that spans the Mississippi River in Hastings, Minnesota. It is one of only four lift spans on the Mississippi River, the others being at Hannibal, Missouri, Burlington, Iowa and in downtown St. Paul, Minnesota. It was built in 1981 by the Milwaukee Road and was designed by Howard, Needles, Tammen & Bergendoff.

It crosses the Mississippi river in a north–south orientation from Hastings just upstream of Point Douglas, where the Saint Croix River empties into the Mississippi river. In addition to CP Rail traffic, the bridge also carries Amtrak's Empire Builder across the river.

Another nearby lift bridge is the Prescott BNSF lift bridge, in Prescott, Wisconsin that crosses the St. Croix River. The two tracks converge at the St. Croix interlocking tower.

== See also ==
- List of crossings of the Upper Mississippi River
