= Clara Mairs =

American painter

- Self-portrait (1953)
- Born: January 5, 1878; Hastings, Minnesota
- Died: May 24, 1963 (aged 85)
- Known for: Painting, printmaking

Clara Gardner Mairs (/ˈmɑːrz/; 1878–1963) was an American painter and printmaker. Her prints were included in the publication Fine Prints of the Year during the 1930s.

== Background and career ==
Clara Gardner Mairs was born on January 5, 1878, in Hastings, Minnesota to Abigail and Samuel Mairs. Her grandfather, Stephen Gardner, built the first grain mill in Dakota County on the Vermillion River. Her father, Samuel Mairs, died in 1891 and Abigail moved a 13-year-old Clara and her three younger siblings, Sam, Helen, and Agnes to St. Paul, Minnesota. Clara attended the Mount Vernon Junior College and Seminary in Washington D.C. from 1895 to 1897. She also trained at the St. Paul School of art, a branch of the St Paul Institute. In the 1910s she attended the Pennsylvania Academy of Fine Arts and studied with impressionist landscape painter Daniel Garber.

Mairs returned to St. Paul by 1918 and supervised the Nimbus Club, an informal art group formed to allow artists to work from a live model. She was also instrumental in founding the Art League of St. Paul, which met in the then defunct St. Paul School of Art's auditorium. Through these groups, Mairs met a young artist named Clement Haupers. Though he was 22 years younger than her, the two would become lifelong companions. They held two-person exhibits at local art galleries and entered many of the same art shows.

In 1923, Mairs and Haupers traveled to Paris where they studied sculpture with Antoine Bourdelle at the Académie Colarossi and painting with André Lhote at the Académie Montparnasse. Mairs also briefly attended the Académie Julian. The pair toured Italy and spent a winter in Algiers before returning to Minnesota in 1925. They later frequented the Kettle River in Pine County, and created paintings of the people and landscape. Mairs then turned her artistic energy towards printmaking before she and Haupers returned to Paris in 1928. She began experimenting with etching techniques and was influenced by Jean Lurçat's gros point panels. Her visits to the zoo inspired tapestries depicting white gibbons and zebras. She also studied with Georges Gorvel. Beginning in Paris and influenced by her earlier work in textile design, Mairs created colorful five-by-six-foot wall hangings.

Mairs' work was included in the Kennedy Galleries' Comprehensive Exhibition of the Works of Living American Print Makers in 1929. Her print Leaping Leopards was reproduced in Fine Prints of the Year 1930. That same year her print Three Ring Circus earned an honorable mention at the Minneapolis Institute of Arts's Minneapolis and St. Paul Artists exhibition. Mairs' etchings were also included in Fine Prints of the Year in both 1932 and 1938. She was a member of the Minnesota Artists Association. She won awards at the Minnesota State Fair in 1925, 1926, 1931, 1933, 1936, and 1950. Mairs had large solo exhibitions at the Art Center in La Jolla in 1949, and in 1951 she showed a solo exhibition of large-scale paintings at the St. Paul Gallery and School of Art.

When Mairs and Haupers returned to St. Paul in 1929,they established a home and studio in the Ramsey Hill neighborhood of St. Paul. Mairs lived and painted in an upper-floor studio. They lived, worked, and exhibited together until their deaths. They never married, and Mairs refused to publicly elaborate on the nature of their relationship.

Mairs' early works featured soft-ground etching, a process she often combined with aquatint. The etching process created textured masses and gave her lines a grainy quality.

Mairs died on May 24, 1963.

Mairs work has been featured posthumously several times. In the 1970s, her print work was exhibited. In 2007, the Minnesota Museum of American Art featured her in their exhibition In Her Own Right: Minnesota’s First Generation of Women Artists.

== Notable works ==
=== Leaping Leopards ===
Mairs' time in Paris influenced the artistic style she used in Leaping Leopards. She created a sense of action through the use of her lines, perspective shifts, and tilts, especially around the boxes the leopards are leaping on. Mairs' work often featured both tilted perspective and simplified forms. The work was featured in the 1930 Fine Prints of the Year and is now owned by St. Catherine University in St. Paul.

=== Clara and Clem ===
Mairs' also often used a pale color scheme. In Clara and Clem, she uses color and simplified forms to express her artistic humor. In the image, she stares at the viewer blankly, and Haupers mirrors her body language.

The work is owned by the Minnesota Historical Society and has featured in several of their exhibits, including as the opening to the exhibit Art Speaks and as one of their 25 objects celebrating the 175th anniversary of the organization.
