= East Second Street Commercial Historic District (Hastings, Minnesota) =

Historic district in Minnesota, United States

- U.S. National Register of Historic Places
- U.S. Historic district
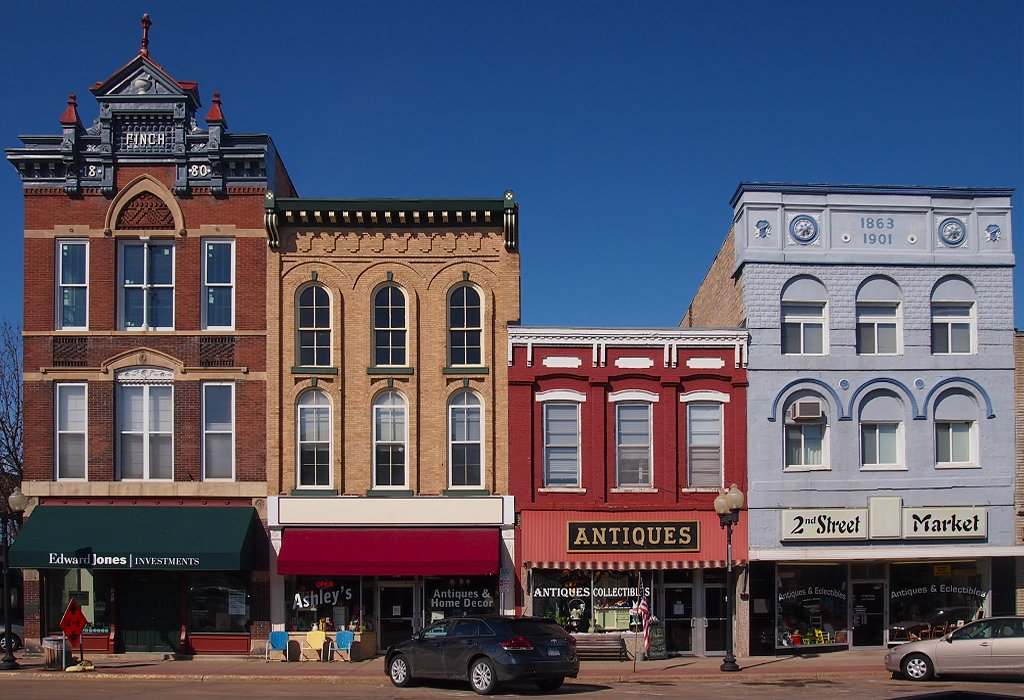
- A block of several historic buildings in downtown Hastings

- Location within Minnesota Location within the United States
- Location: Hastings, Minnesota
- Coordinates: 44°44′39.81″N 92°51′1.14″W
- NRHP reference No.: 78003070
- Added to NRHP: July 31, 1978

The East Second Street Commercial Historic District in Hastings, Minnesota, United States, is a downtown district consisting of thirty-five commercial buildings built between 1860 and 1900. The downtown area has retained its historic integrity even as other communities modernized their downtowns as a result of post-World War II urban renewal efforts.

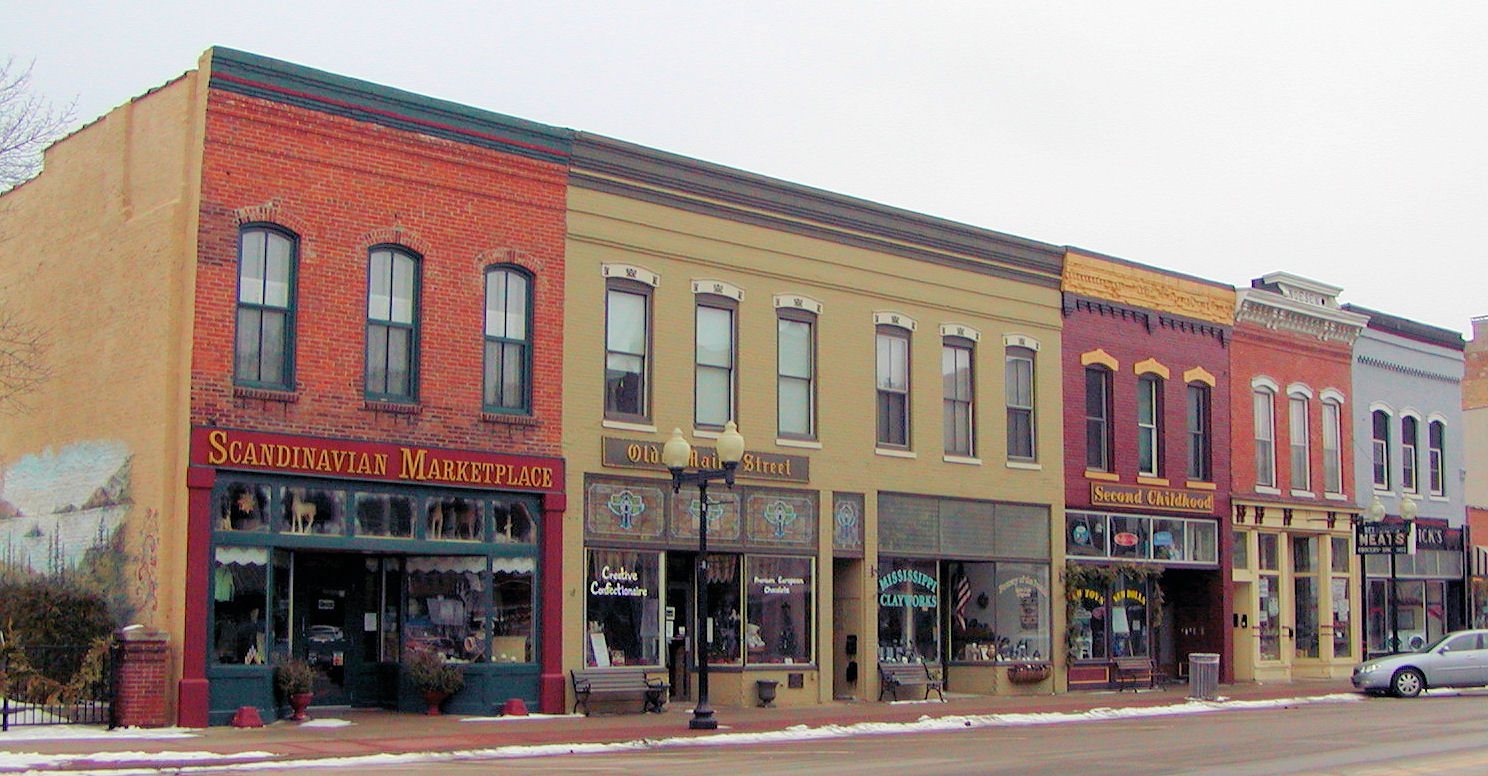
South side of street

The district contains a number of two- and three-story buildings, each in a unique style. Although the buildings are very different, common features include distinctive parapets at the roofline, often with the name of the business inlaid in brick or metal. The storefronts include large display windows with a main entrance flanked by cast iron or wooden columns. The upper levels of the buildings often include windows topped with ornate hoods.

The historic integrity of the district is maintained through a number of guidelines that encourage the restoration of buildings to their original appearance, the replacement of any historic features that were altered, and avoidance of alterations that are not in keeping with the buildings' original historic context.
