= West Second Street Residential Historic District =

Historic district in Minnesota, United States

- U.S. National Register of Historic Places
- U.S. Historic district
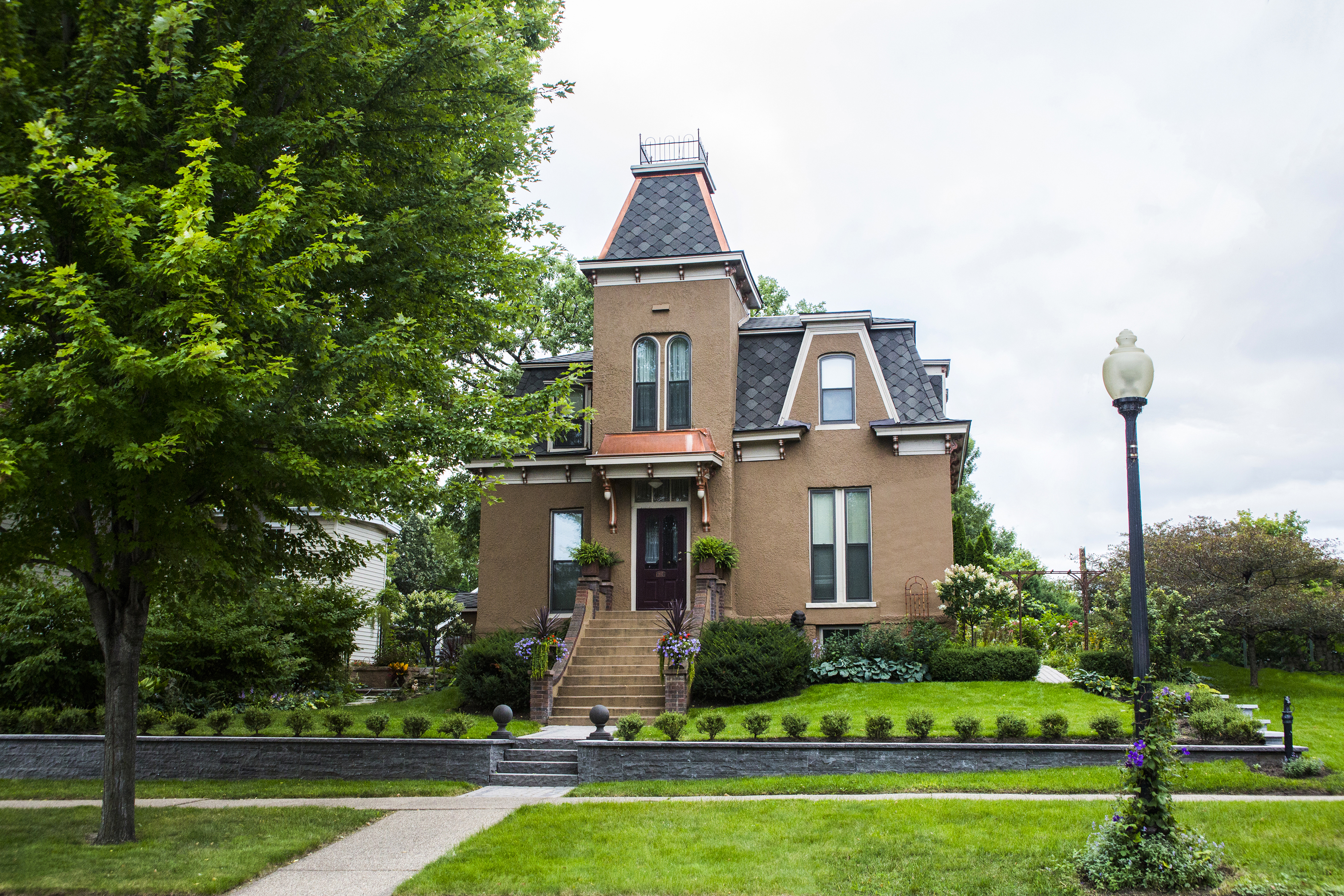
- The Strauss House, North Elevation

- Location within Minnesota Location within the United States
- Coordinates: 44°44′38.21″N 92°51′19.33″W
- Built: 1857
- Architectural style: Greek Revival, Late Victorian
- NRHP reference No.: 78003072
- Added to NRHP: July 31, 1978

The West Second Street Residential Historic District is a historic district in Hastings, Minnesota, United States. The district contains thirteen architecturally significant homes built between 1857 and 1890.

== Norrish House ==
The Norrish House was built between 1857 and 1858 in an octagonal shape and features a cupola and a wraparound porch. The construction is of limestone that has been stuccoed over.

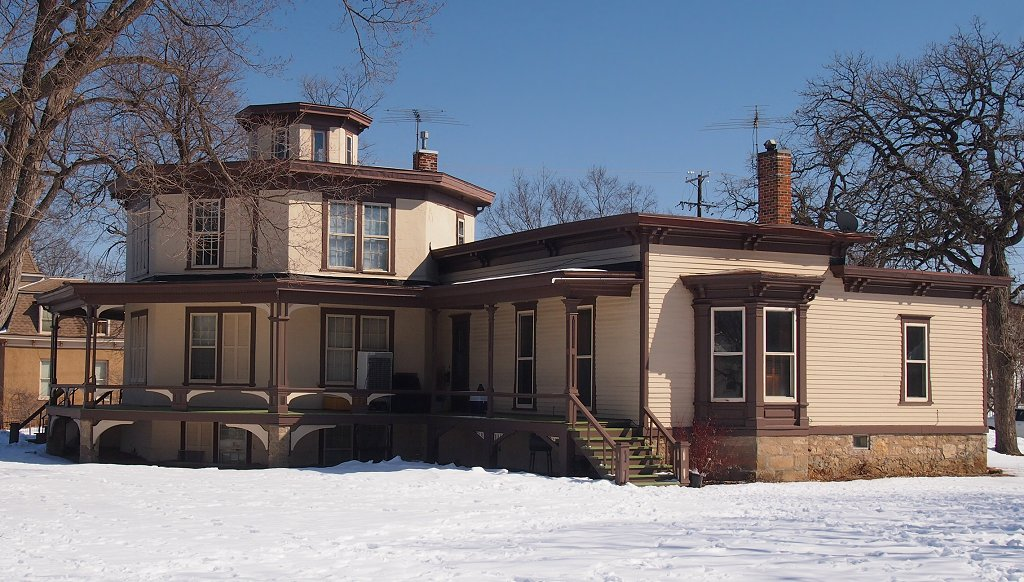

== Thorne-Lowell House ==
The Thorne-Lowell was built in 1861 of limestone in the Italian Villa style and featuring a cupola.

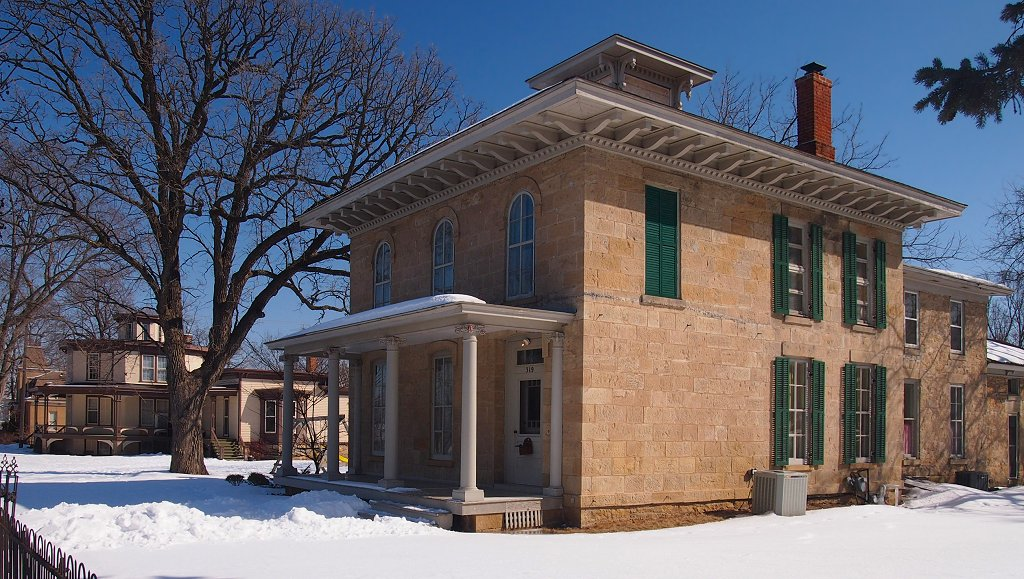

== Pringle House ==
The Pringle House was built in 1870 in the Italianate style, sided with clapboard and including features such as a multi-gabled roof, bracketed cornice, bay windows, portico, and a full front porch.

== Strauss House ==
The Strauss House, built in 1875 in the Second Empire style, faced with stucco and topped with a mansard roof (Northeast Elevation).

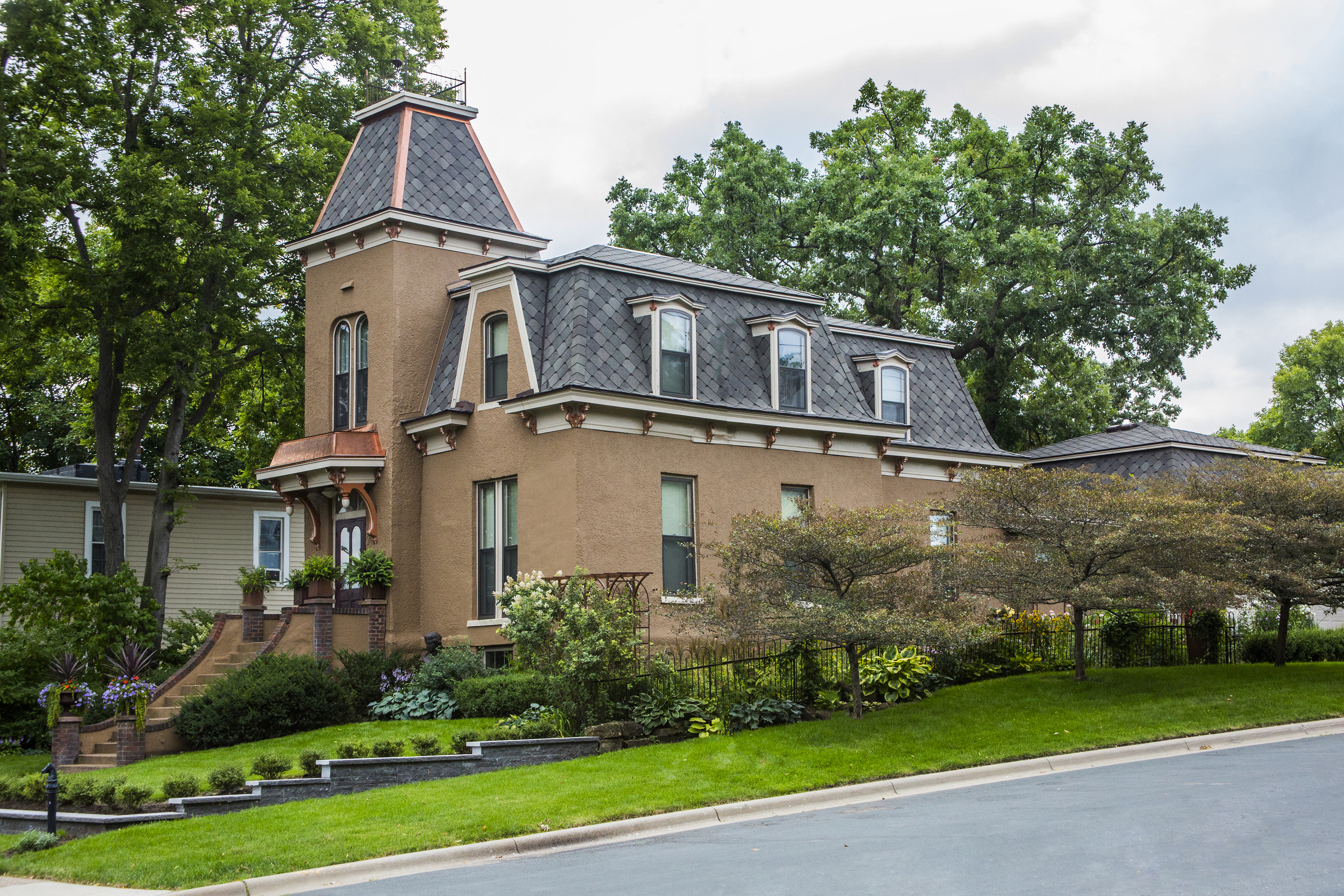
