= Fasbender Clinic =

Building in Hastings, Minnesota

- Fasbender Clinic Building
- U.S. National Register of Historic Places
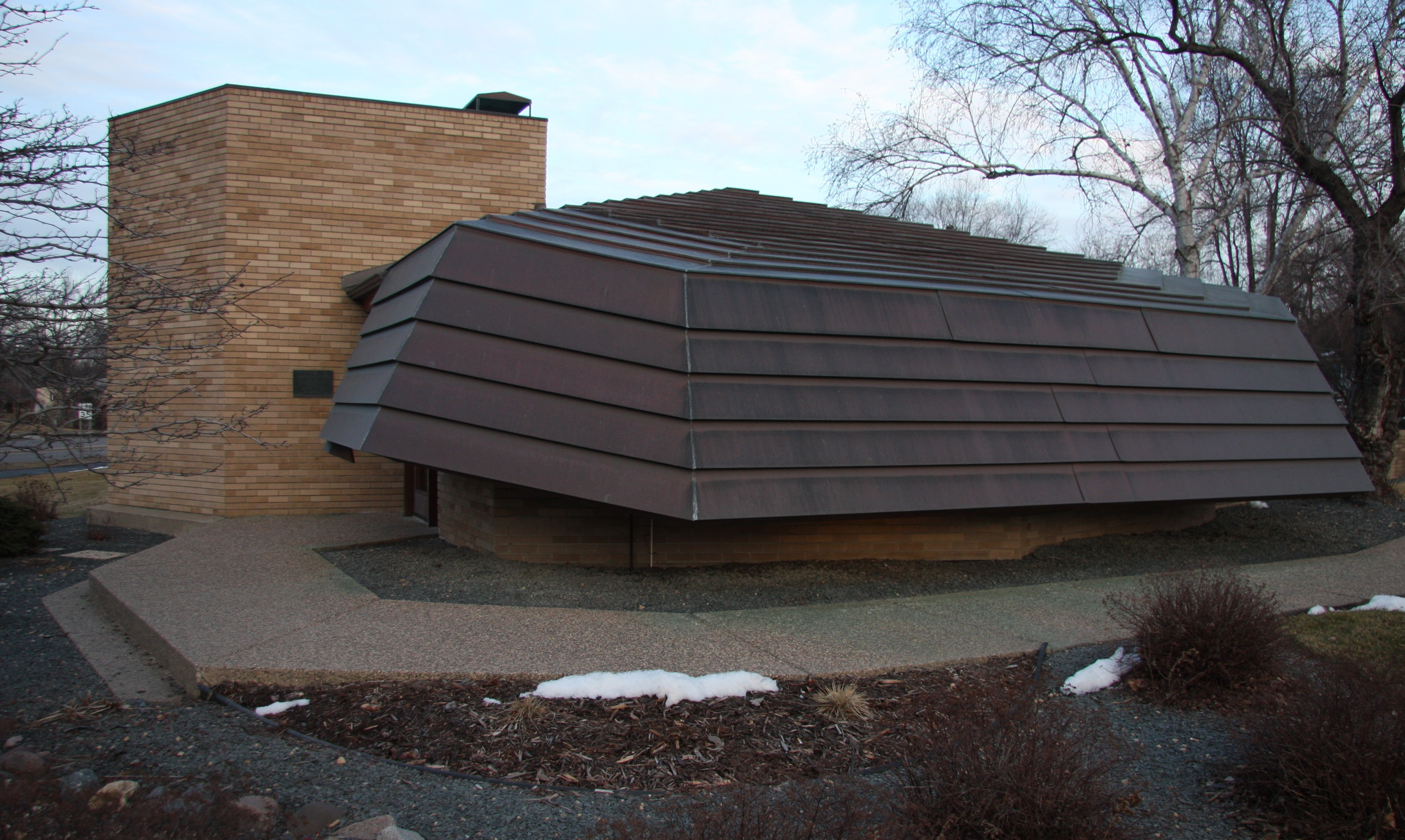
- The Fasbender Clinic in 2015

- Location within Minnesota Location within the United States
- Location: Hastings, Minnesota, United States
- Coordinates: 44°44′16.81″N 92°51′45.08″W
- Built: 1959
- Architect: Frank Lloyd Wright
- NRHP reference No.: 79001228
- Added to NRHP: December 31, 1979

Fasbender Clinic is a building in Hastings, Minnesota, United States, designed by Frank Lloyd Wright and constructed in 1957. It was listed on the National Register of Historic Places in 1979. It is just off Minnesota State Highway 55 at 801 Pine Street. It has a distinctive copper roof which extends almost to the ground around much of the exterior.

== See also ==
- List of Frank Lloyd Wright works
