= Lock and Dam No. 2 =

Dam in Minnesota, U.S.

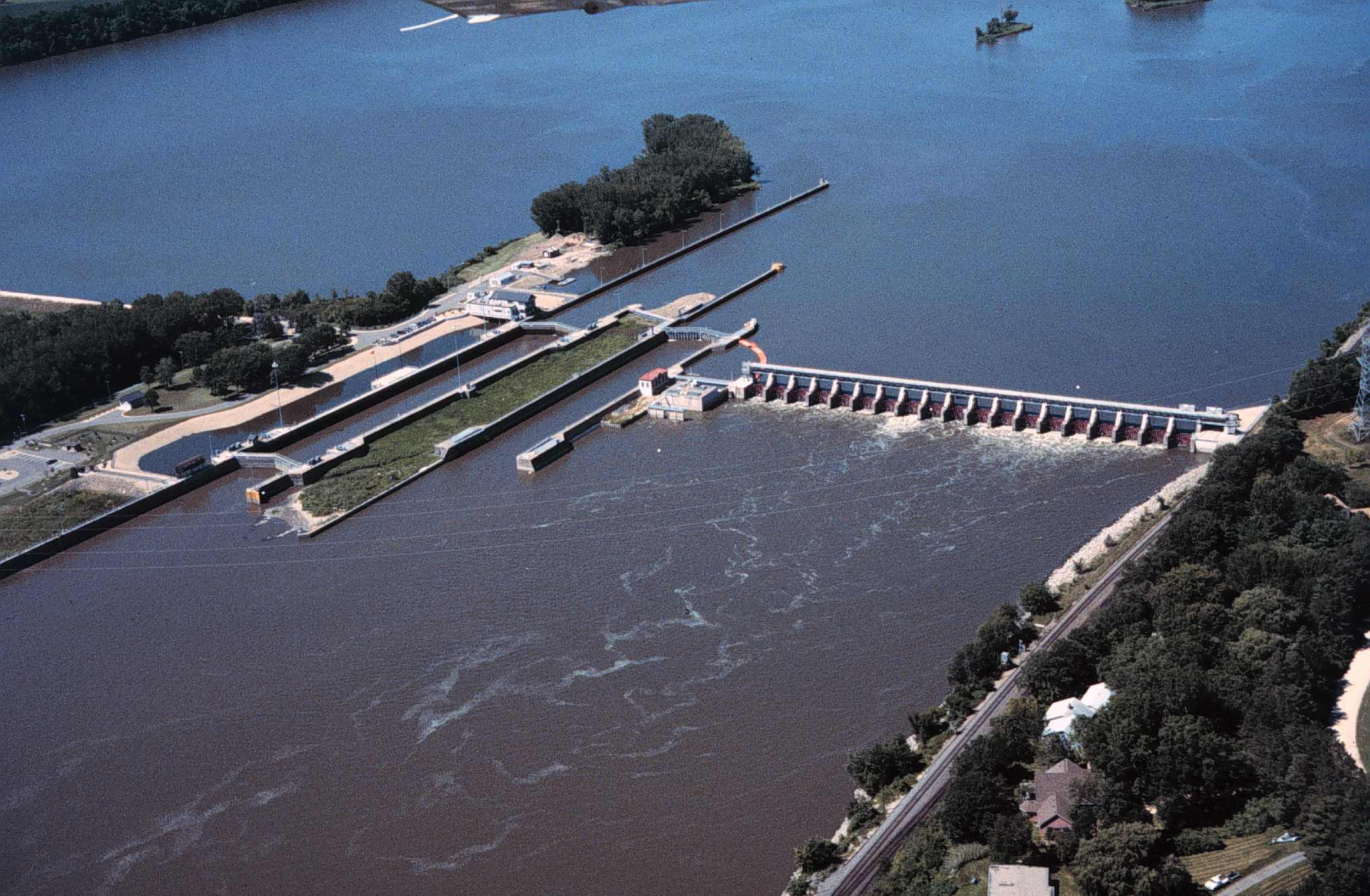
- Mississippi River Lock and Dam No. 2

- Location within Minnesota
- Location: Dakota County / Washington County, Minnesota, United States. Near Hastings
- Coordinates: 44°45′35″N 92°52′07″W
- Opening date: 1930; 96 years ago
- Operators: U.S. Army Corps of Engineers, St. Paul District

Dam and spillways
- Impounds: Upper Mississippi River
- Length: 722 feet (220.1 m) (movable portion)

Reservoir
- Creates: Pool 2
- Total capacity: 787,000 acre⋅ft (0.971 km^{3})
- Catchment area: 36,990 mi^{2} (95,800 km^{2})

Lock and Dam No. 2 is located along the Upper Mississippi River near Hastings, Minnesota and construction commenced in 1927. The eastern dam portion is 722 feet (220 m) wide and has 19 tainter gates. A hydroelectric station that produces about 4.4 megawatts is owned by the city of Hastings, while the 110 by 600 feet (34 m × 183 m) lock is operated by the St. Paul district of the U.S. Army Corps of Engineers' Mississippi Valley Division. There's also a wide earthen dam on the western side of the facility.

Following construction, the original lock walls settled and began to lean out of alignment, so a replacement lock was built. It was finished in 1948. A rehabilitation phase ran from 1987 to 1995. In 2009, Lock and Dam No. 2 became home to the nation's first commercial, federally licensed hydrokinetic power facility, which is a partnership between the City of Hastings and Hydro Green Energy, LLC of Westmont, IL.

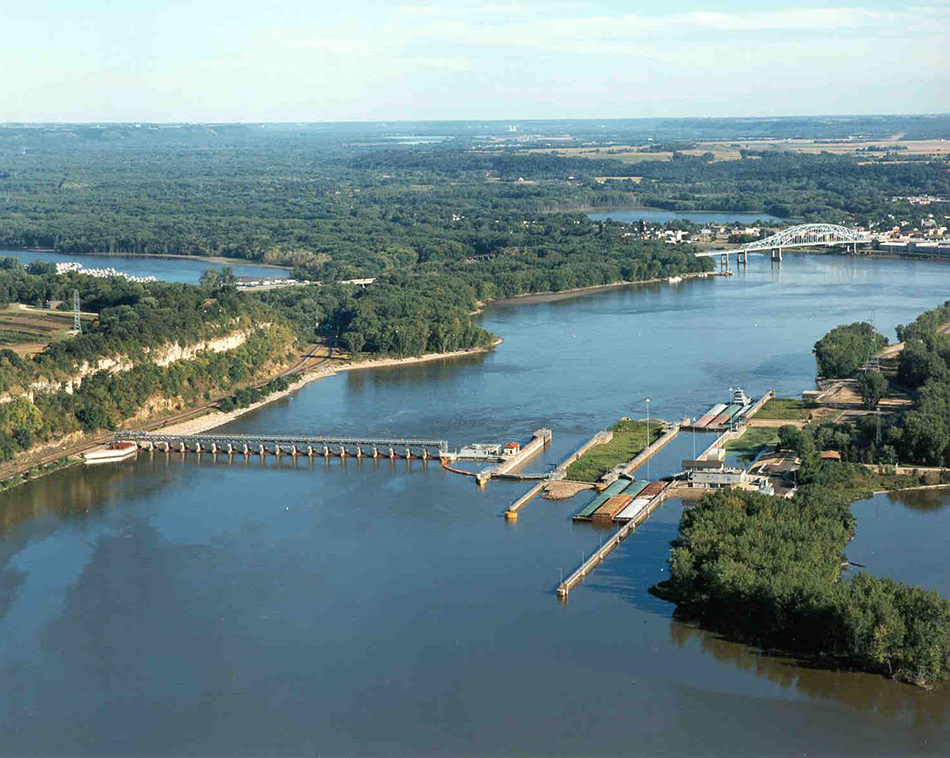

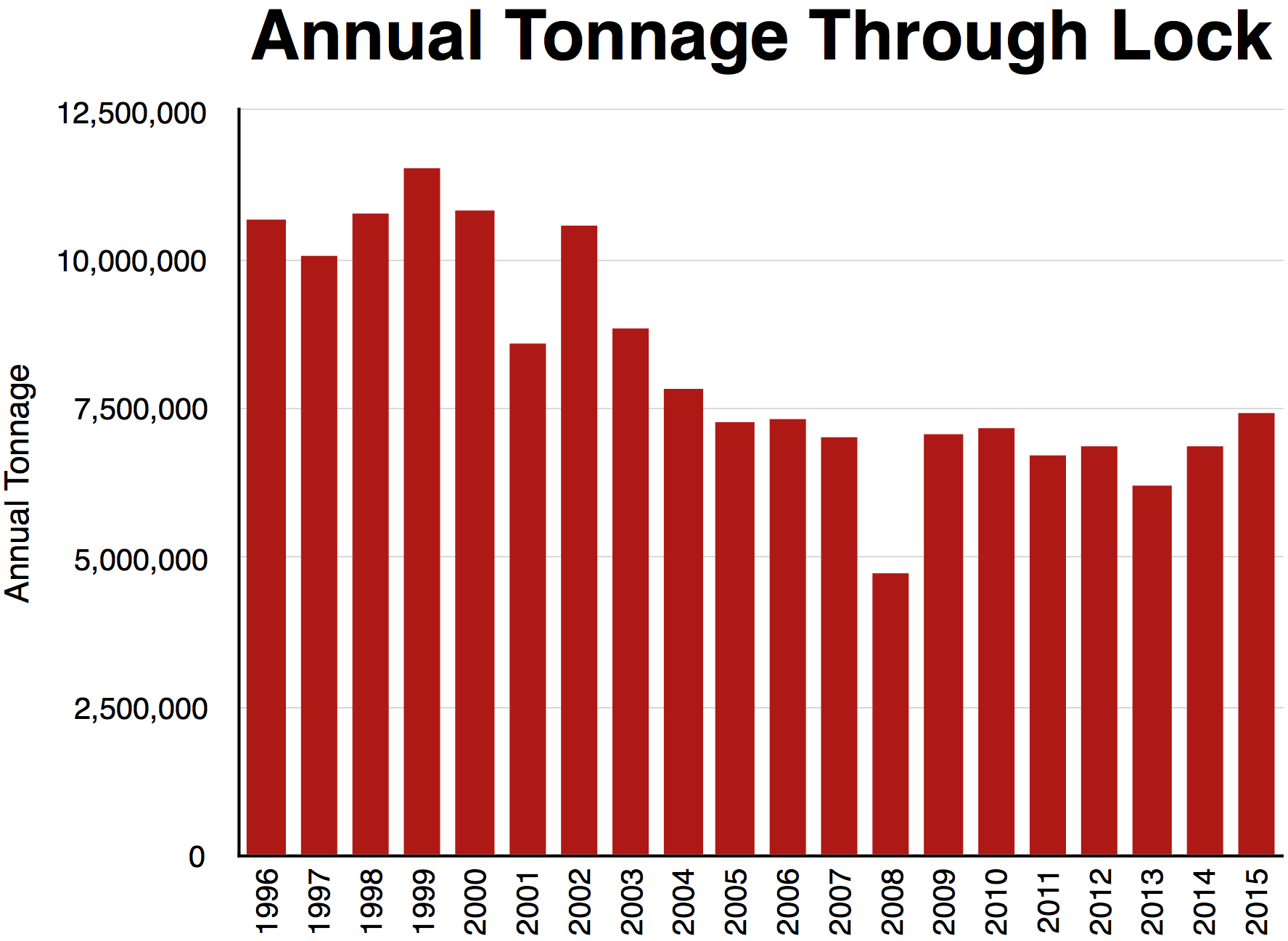
lock and dam 2 tonnage

== See also ==
- Mississippi National River and Recreation Area
