= Ramsey Mill and Old Mill Park =

- U.S. National Register of Historic Places
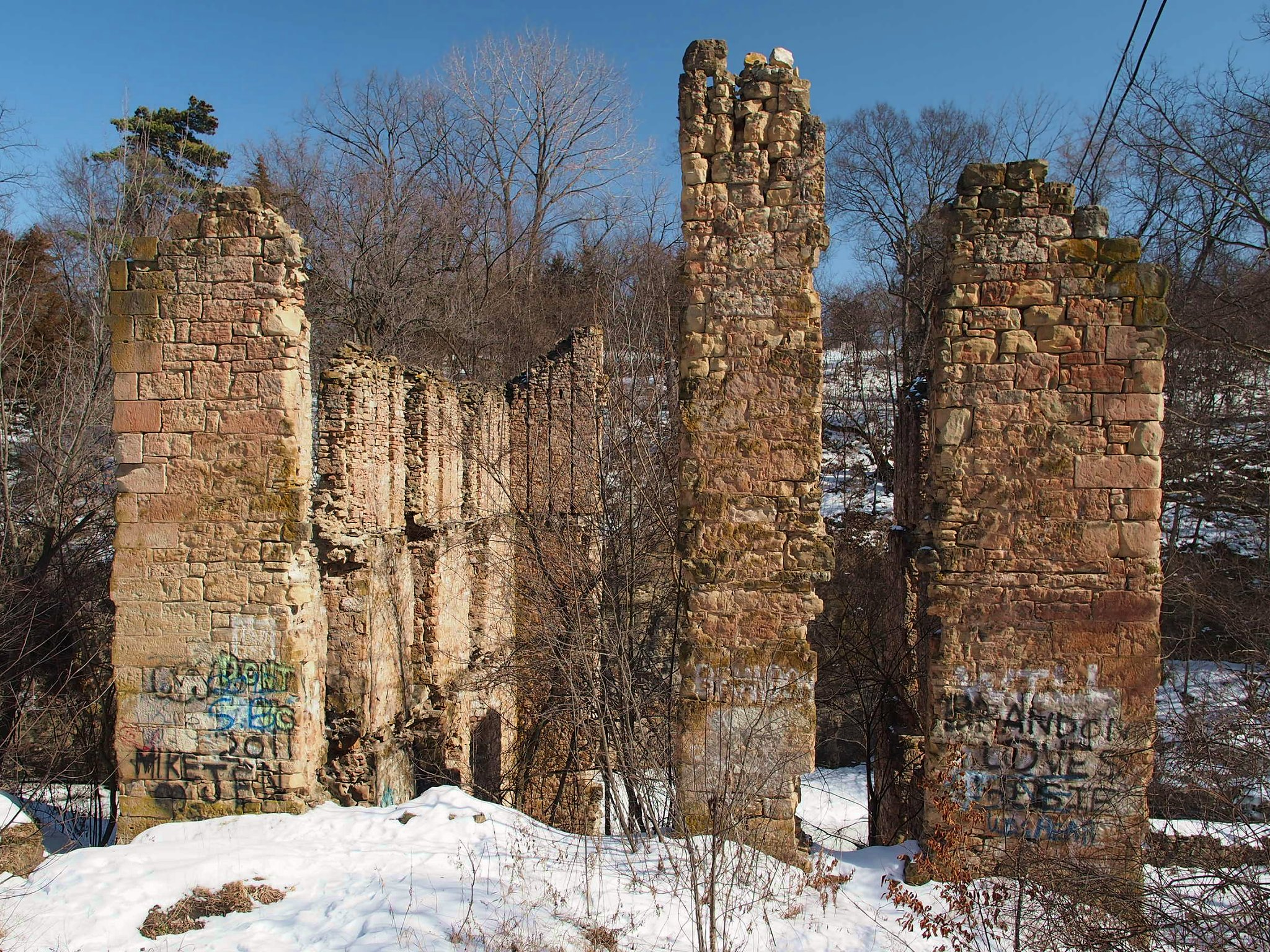
- The ruins of the Ramsey Mill in Old Mill Park

- Location within Minnesota Location within the United States
- Location: Jct of 18th St. and Vermillion R., Hastings, Minnesota
- Coordinates: 44°43′36″N 92°50′35″W
- Built: 1856–7, 1925
- Architect: Ira Parke
- NRHP reference No.: 98000872
- Added to NRHP: July 15, 1998

The Ramsey Mill was built by Alexander Ramsey and Dr. Thomas Foster in 1856–1857 on the Vermillion River in the town of Hastings in the U.S. state of Minnesota. The river had a head of 19 feet (6 m) and a width of 50 feet (15 m) near the 4 story gristmill. An addition included a cooper shop and storage facility. Although Ramsey sold his interest in 1877, it retained his name. Maximum output was achieved in 1894, at 125 barrels per day. On December 22, 1894, the building burned, possibly due to arson.

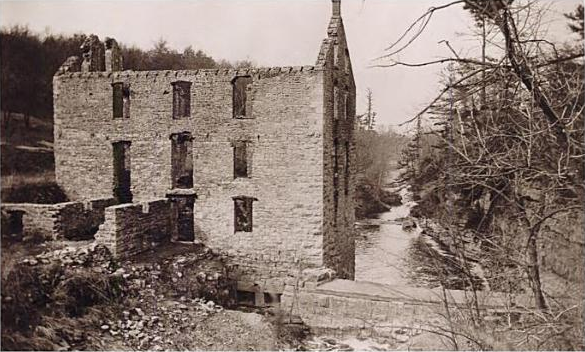
Ramsey Mill ruins, 1902
