= Vermillion River (Minnesota) =

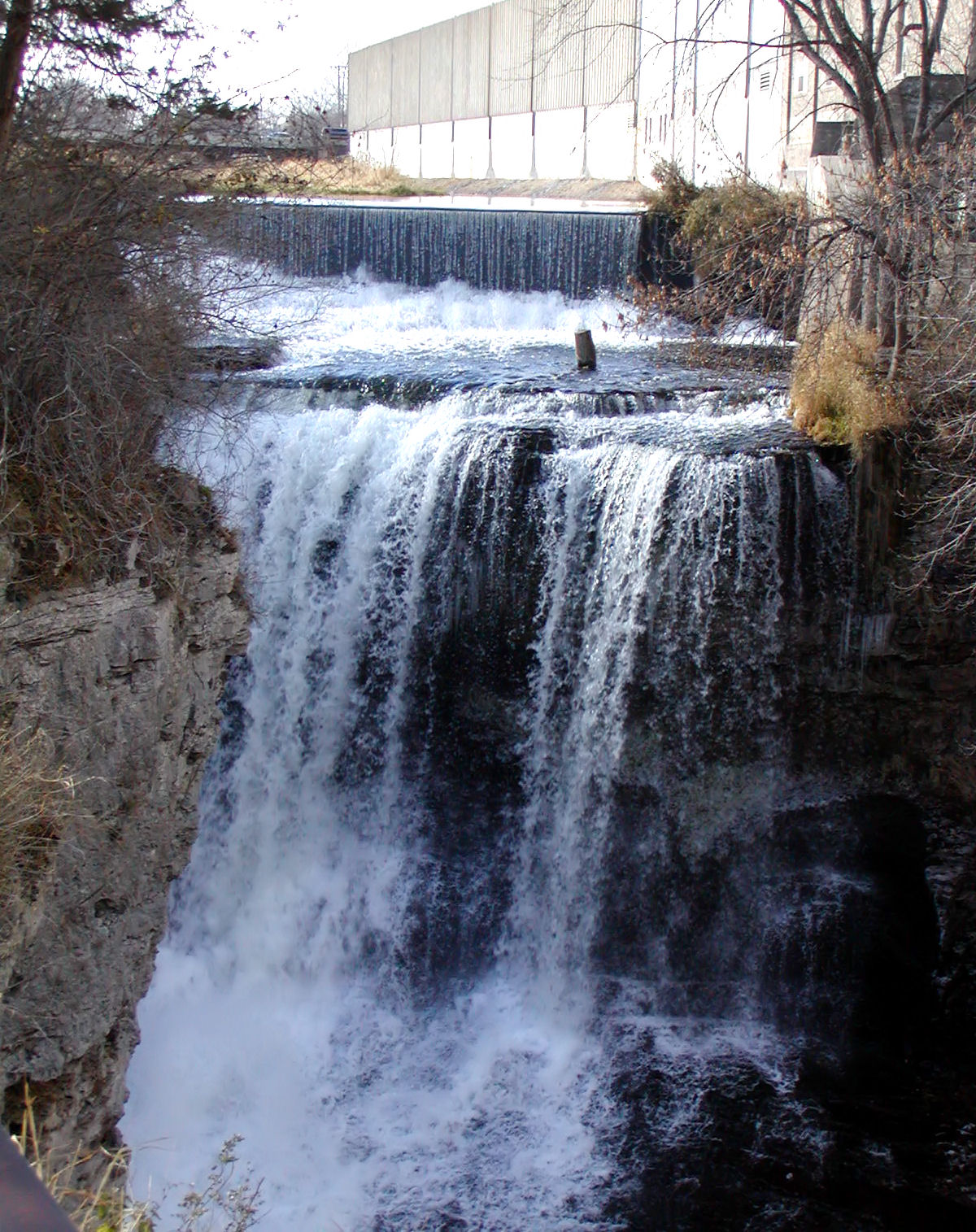
- Vermillion Falls in Hastings

- Mouth of the Vermillion River
- Native name: Wa Se Sa Wa Kpa (Dakota)

Location
- Country: United States
- State: Minnesota
- County: Goohue County, Dakota County, Scott County

Physical characteristics
- Source
  - location: New Market, Minnesota
  - coordinates: 44°35′10″N 93°20′10″W
- Mouth
  - location: Welch, Minnesota
  - coordinates: 44°37′14″N 92°40′01″W
- Length: 59.6 mi (95.9 km)
- Basin size: 335 mi^{2} (870 km^{2})

Basin features
- River system: Mississippi River
- Tributaries
  - right: South Branch Vermillion River
- Waterfalls: Vermillion Falls

The Vermillion River, known in Dakota as Wa Se Sa Wa Kpa, is a 59.6-mile (95.9 km) waterway that meanders through Scott County and Dakota County in Minnesota, entering the Mississippi River floodplain just south of Hastings. 13.5 miles (21.7 km) of it are designated as a trout stream, which is unusual for being so close to a metropolitan area. Trophy-sized trout used to be found in the river often but now rarely.

== Description ==
Vermillion, derived from the French for "red", was probably so named from deposits of ochre the Dakota used for body painting. Also in reference to the ochre deposits, the Dakota name for the river, Wa Se Sa Wa Kpa, translates to 'Red Paint River'.

The Vermillion is a state-designated trout stream, managed for catch-and-release fishing of brown trout. The portion of the river that supports trout is upstream, around the towns of Farmington; Empire, and the City of Lakeville. After the waterfall in the city of Hastings, the water becomes too warm to support trout. Downstream from the falls on the south side of Hastings, the water becomes even warmer, supporting riverine species such as northern pike and freshwater drum. The Minnesota state record black crappie of 5.0 pounds was caught in the Vermillion River in 1940. An old channel of the Vermillion River continues south from Hastings on the western edge of the Mississippi valley.

== Activities on the river ==
In the nineteenth and early twentieth century, the river was used for water power, supplying power to gristmills. A park surrounding the falls preserves the remains of a mill operated by Alexander Ramsey, one of the leading citizens of early Minnesota.

The nonprofit conservation group Minnesota Trout Unlimited and its volunteers have invested hundreds of thousands of dollars in physical restoration of the river and adjoining upland areas, funding four projects through grants from the state's Outdoor Heritage Fund. The Twin Cities chapter of Trout Unlimited sponsors a local community volunteer group called the Vermillion Riverkeepers. Volunteers work with the Minnesota Department of Natural Resources to remove invasive non-native species such as buckthorn from several state DNR Aquatic Management Areas (AMAs), in addition to fisheries research and stream restoration projects .

Another group, Friends of the Mississippi River, engages people in cleanups, restoration events and educational activities through its Vermillion Stewards Program and accesses state grant funding to enable upland restoration across hundreds of acres in the Vermillion watershed.

== Gallery of images ==
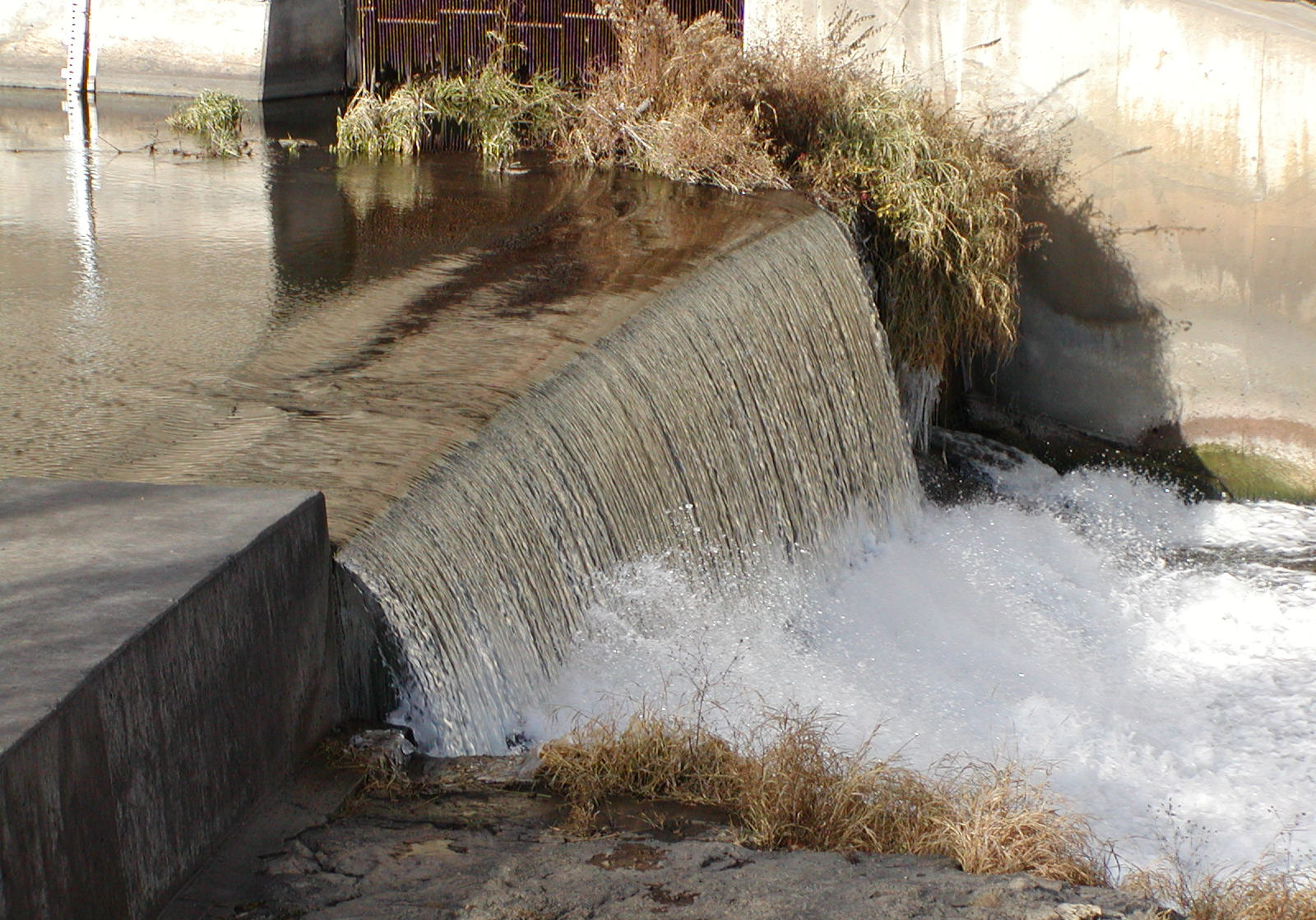
Vermillion River upper falls in Hastings

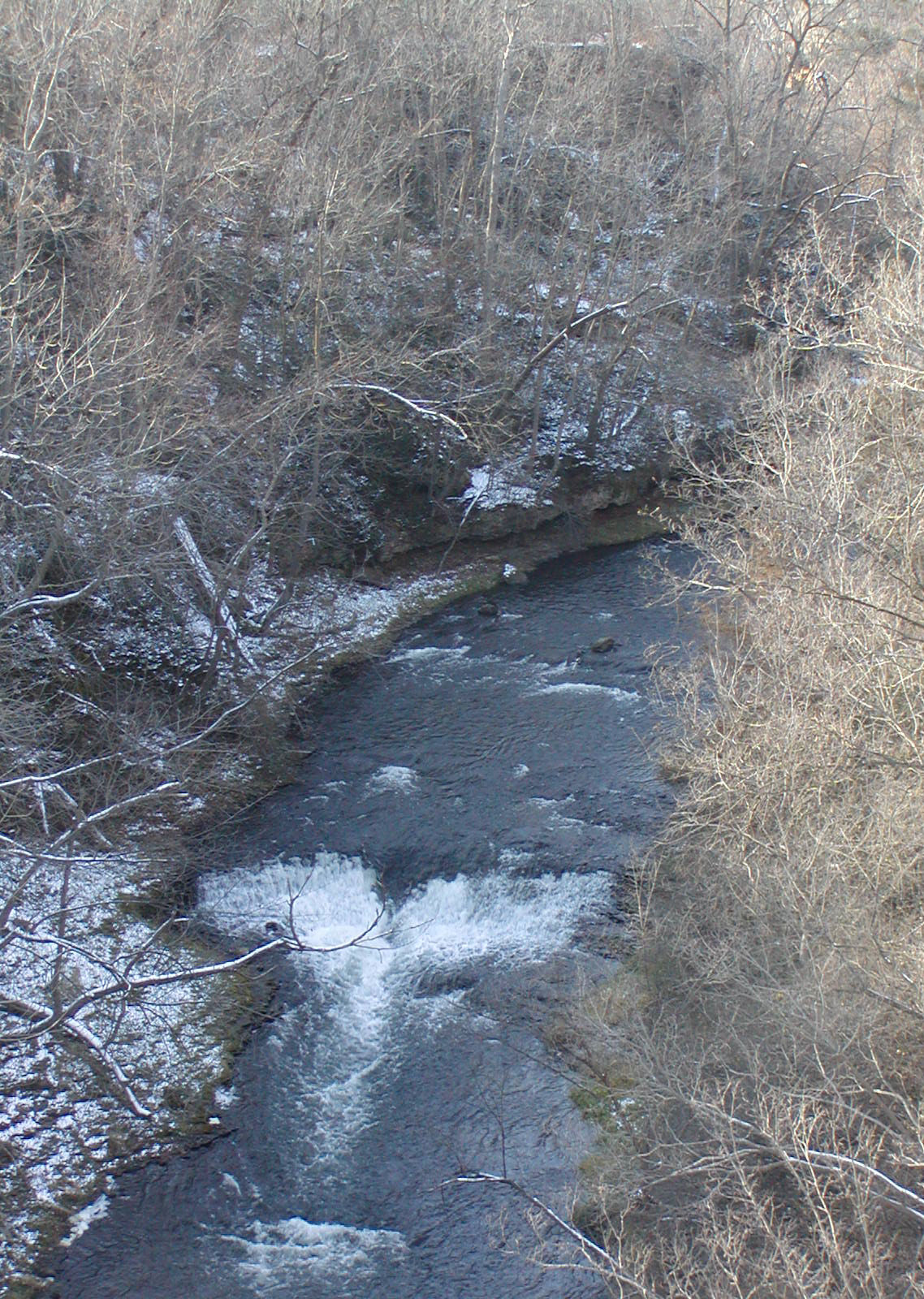
Vermillion River valley in Hastings

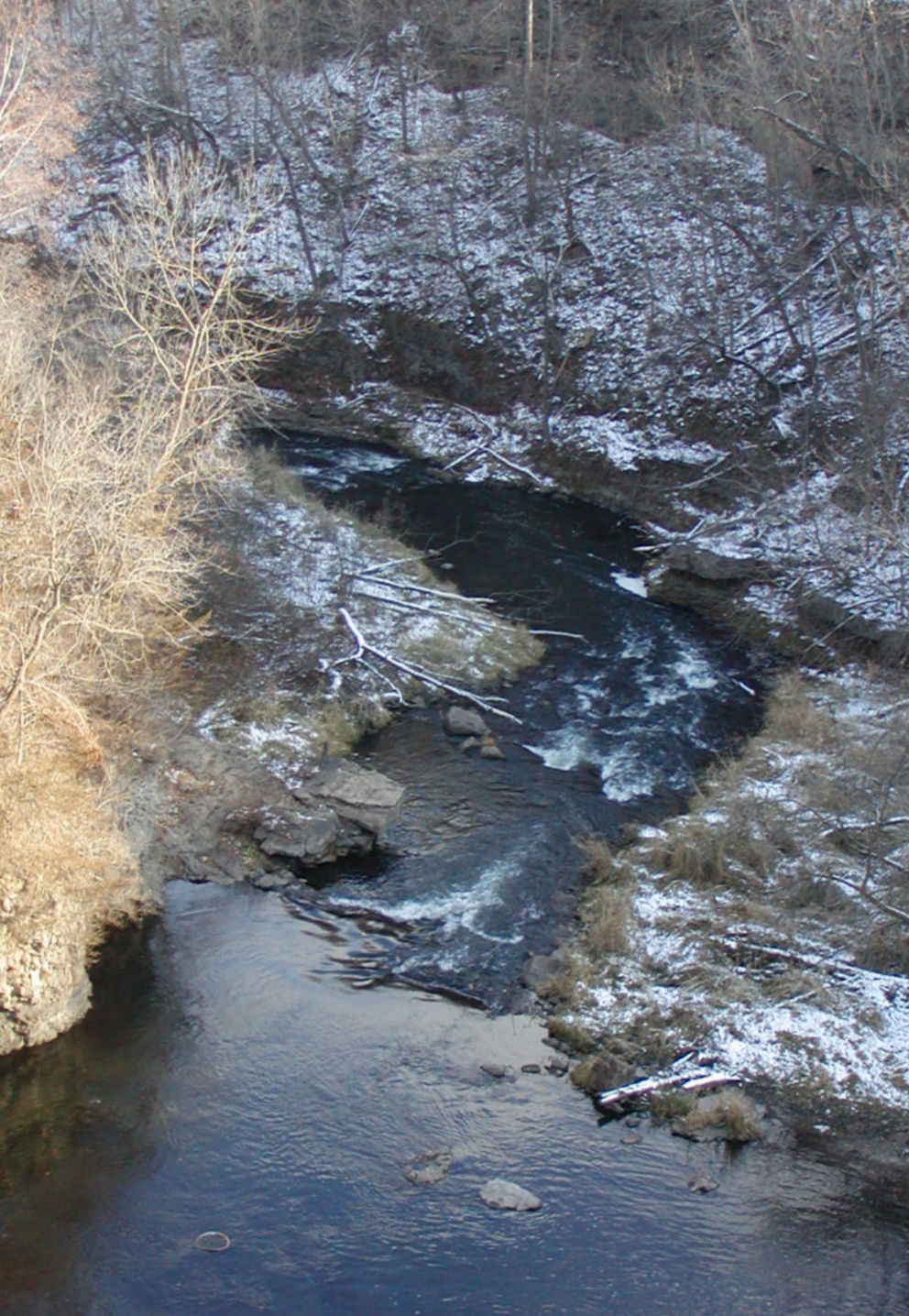
Vermillion River valley in Hastings

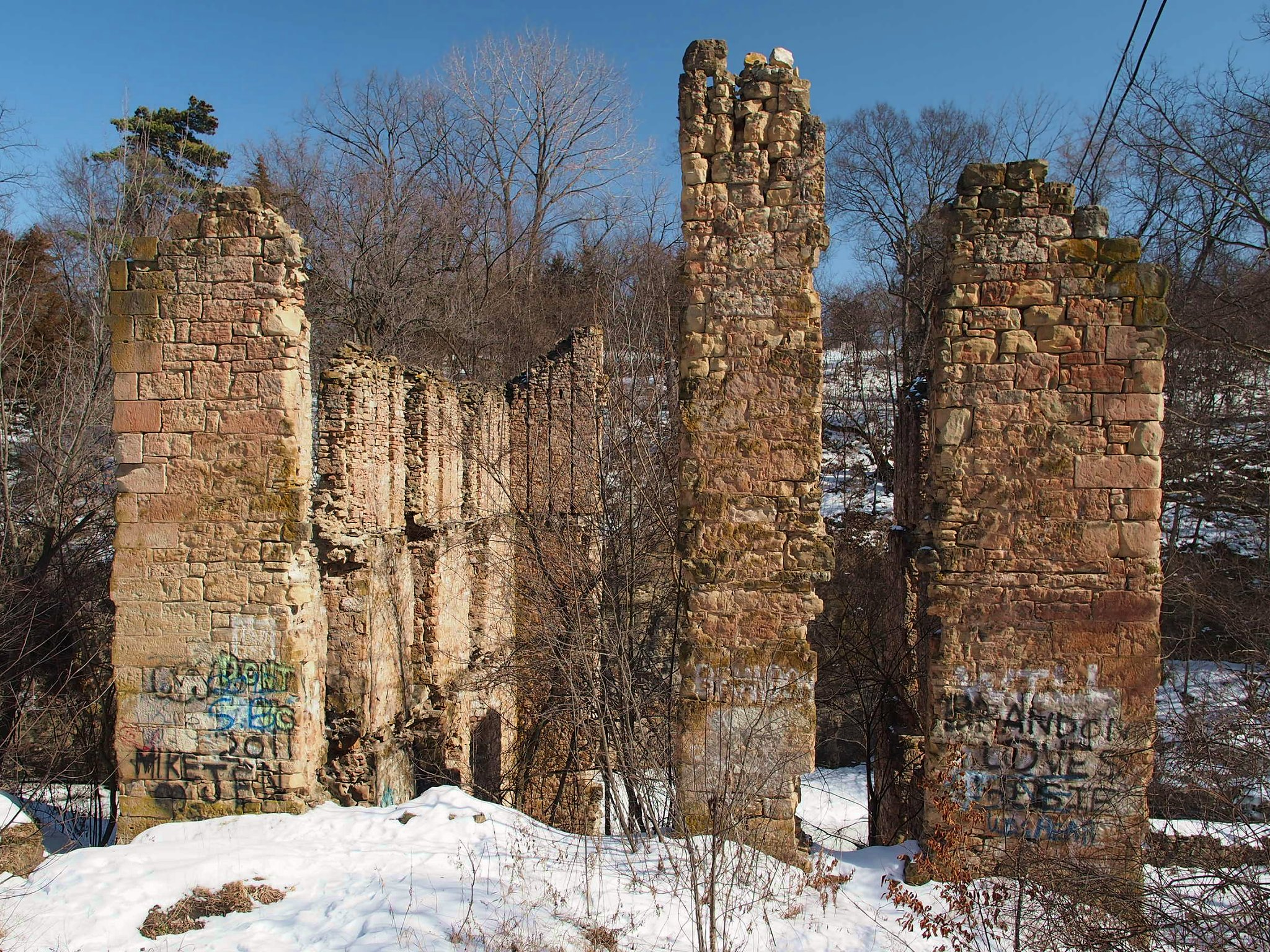
Ruin of the 1857 Ramsey Mill

== See also ==
- List of rivers of Minnesota
- List of waterfalls
