= Clement Haupers =

American painter

Clement Bernard Haupers (March 1, 1900 – December 1, 1982) was an American painter, printmaker, arts administrator, and arts educator active from the 1920s to the 1980s. He is best known for his directorship of the Minnesota Works Progress Administration Federal Art Project and for his influence in the Minnesota art community.

== Biography ==
Clement Haupers was born in Saint Paul, Minnesota, on March 1, 1900. In 1918, he began taking courses at the Minneapolis School of Art and joined the Art League of St. Paul, organized by the artist Clara Mairs. Haupers and Mairs started an unconventional relationship, which lasted until her death in 1963. For more than forty years they traveled, exhibited, and lived together as life partners.

Because of the difference in their ages and the ambiguity of their relationship, Mairs and Haupers remained always a bit of a Twin Cities scandal. In 1929, they established a home and studio in St. Paul's Ramsey Hill neighborhood, a local artists’ enclave. The house itself belonged to Haupers while the land belonged to Mairs. He had it moved from its original location on Randolph Ave to Ramsey Hill.

In 1923, with Mairs, Haupers traveled to Paris. The 1920s in Paris were known as Les Années Folles, the Crazy Years. It was a time and place of social and artistic experimentation. This was true especially in the studios, cafés, and nightclubs of the Montparnasse district, the center of Paris's bohemian culture. Mairs and Haupers stayed in France for two years, attending classes held by notable artists such as the sculptor Émile-Antoine Bourdelle and the Cubist painter André Lhote. A photograph taken at the Académie Montparnasse in 1923 shows Haupers, seated on the floor, with a white tie. Mairs sits on the floor to his left.

=== 1930s and later ===
Haupers brought some of the style of Montparnasse to his work back in Minnesota. The 1926 work Two Girls, One Sailor shows the influence of Cubism and Jazz Age aesthetics in the angular faces and bodies and the strong shadows of the dancers, the violinist, and the sailor. The formal use of color and composition that Haupers developed in Paris can be seen throughout his works, from the angular red roofs of Provencale Landscape to the softer colors and trail of bright lights of View of Kellogg Boulevard From My Window. France also had an influence on other aspects of Haupers’ style. Works such as the drypoint print Three Graces show a decidedly French treatment of nudity and the body—slightly shocking to mid-century Minnesotan eyes.

Haupers became the superintendent of the Fine Arts Department of the Minnesota State Fair in 1931, a position he held until 1942. Under the previous superintendent, these exhibitions featured works brought in from galleries in New York and Chicago. In 1931, a group of local artists protested this lack of local representation in one of Minnesota's most important art exhibitions. During a meeting with Fair officials at St. Paul's Lowry Hotel, Haupers was, in his words, “shoved” by fellow artist Cameron Booth into leading the department. Exhibitions under Haupers stressed the importance of the growing Minnesota art scene. Juried prize shows were reinstated, as were special exhibitions representing well-known and up-and-coming local artists.

In 1935, the WPA Federal Art Project began supporting the visual arts, with Haupers as the director of the Minnesota division. Eighteen months later he became the regional director, overseeing the project in seven Midwestern states. In 1941, he moved to Washington, D.C., as the assistant to the national director, Holger Cahill. As the director of the Minnesota FAP, Haupers promoted public patronage of the visual arts and directed a program that sent art, artists, and art education all around Minnesota. He was a successful and indefatigable director and his devotion to securing projects and supporting young and established artists greatly influenced the growth of the arts in Minnesota.

In addition to his work with the State Fair and the FAP, Haupers was well known as an art educator. He began teaching in 1930s at the St. Paul Arts and Crafts Center and the St. Paul Gallery and School of Art and continued teaching until his death. His influence on decades of young artists was as instrumental in developing the visual arts in Minnesota as his administrative roles. In 1965, Haupers was the subject of an oral history interview about the Federal Art Project, and was also interviewed in 1977 and 1981 as part of the Minnesota Artists Oral History Project, transcripts of which are available online.

Haupers died on December 1, 1982, three months after his last solo exhibition.
