= Hastings, Minnesota =

City in Minnesota, United States

Hastings
- City
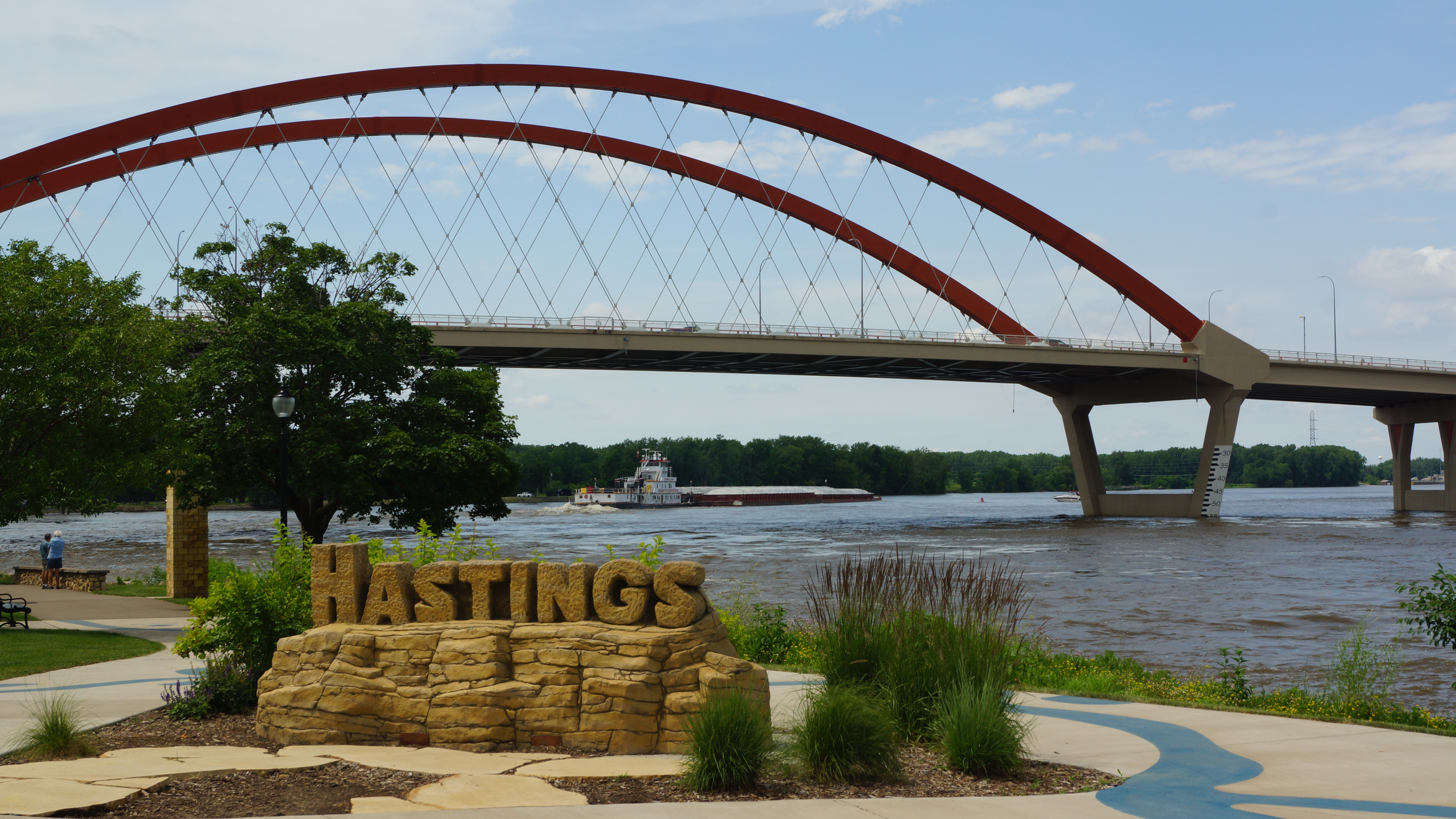
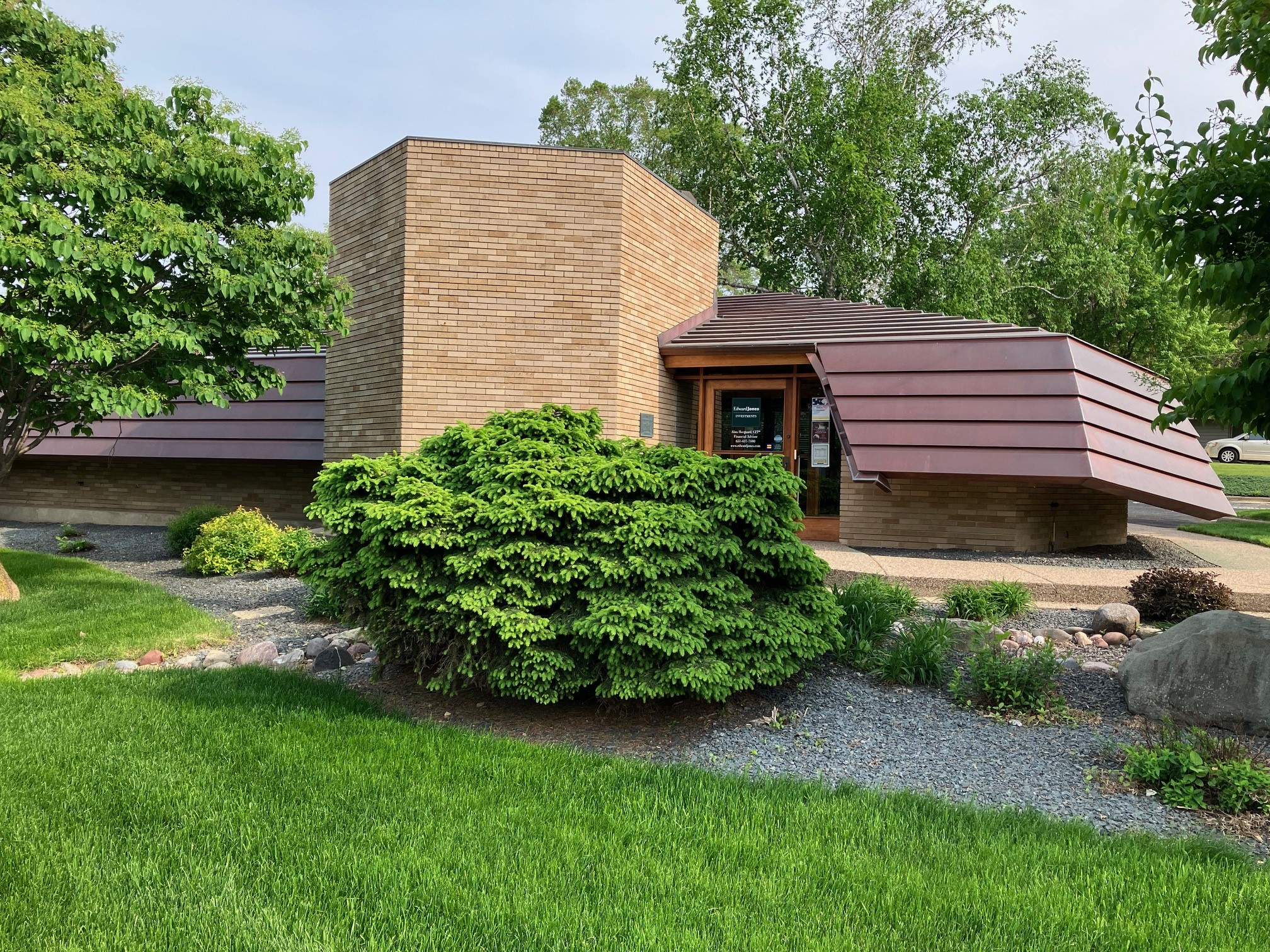
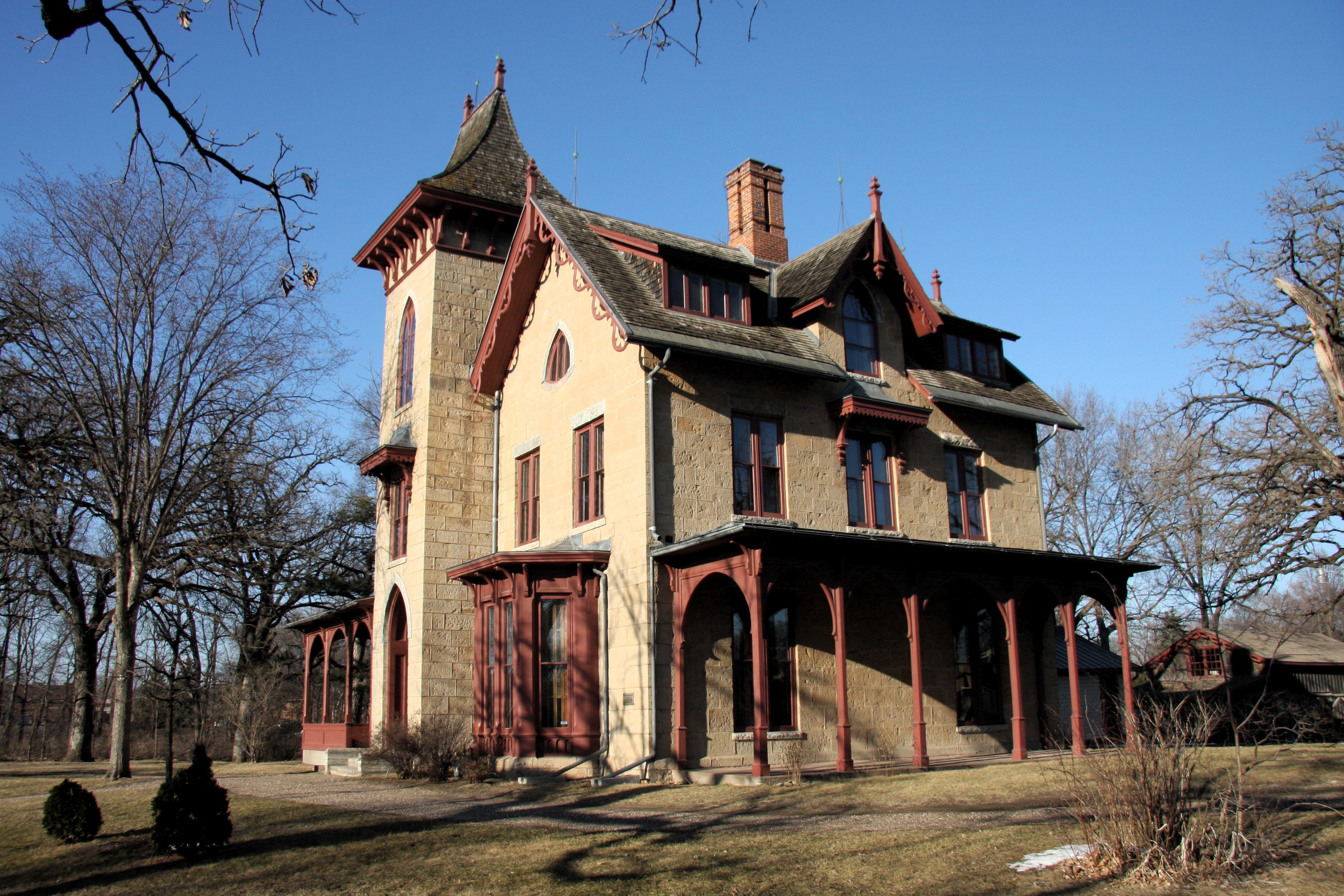
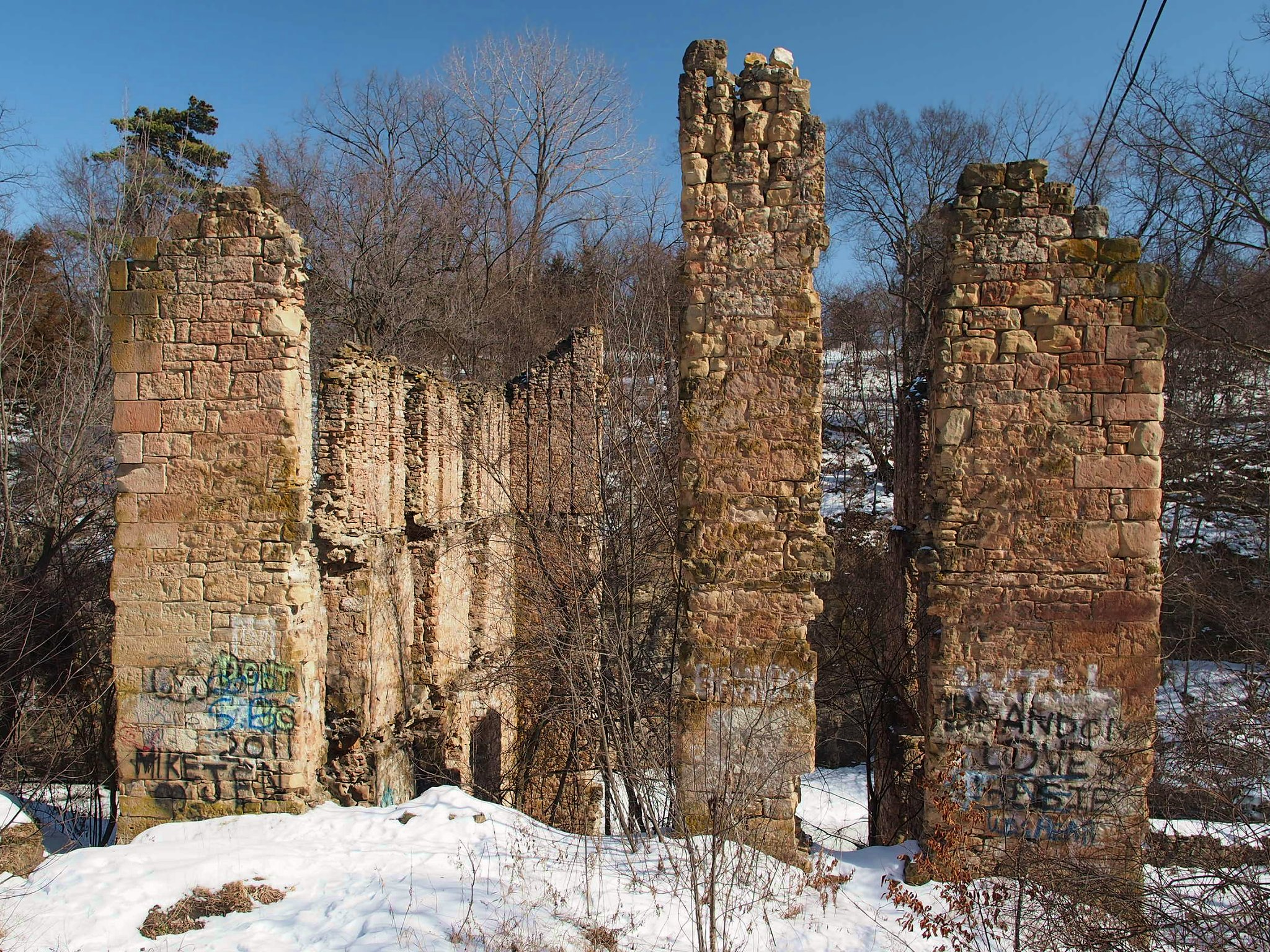
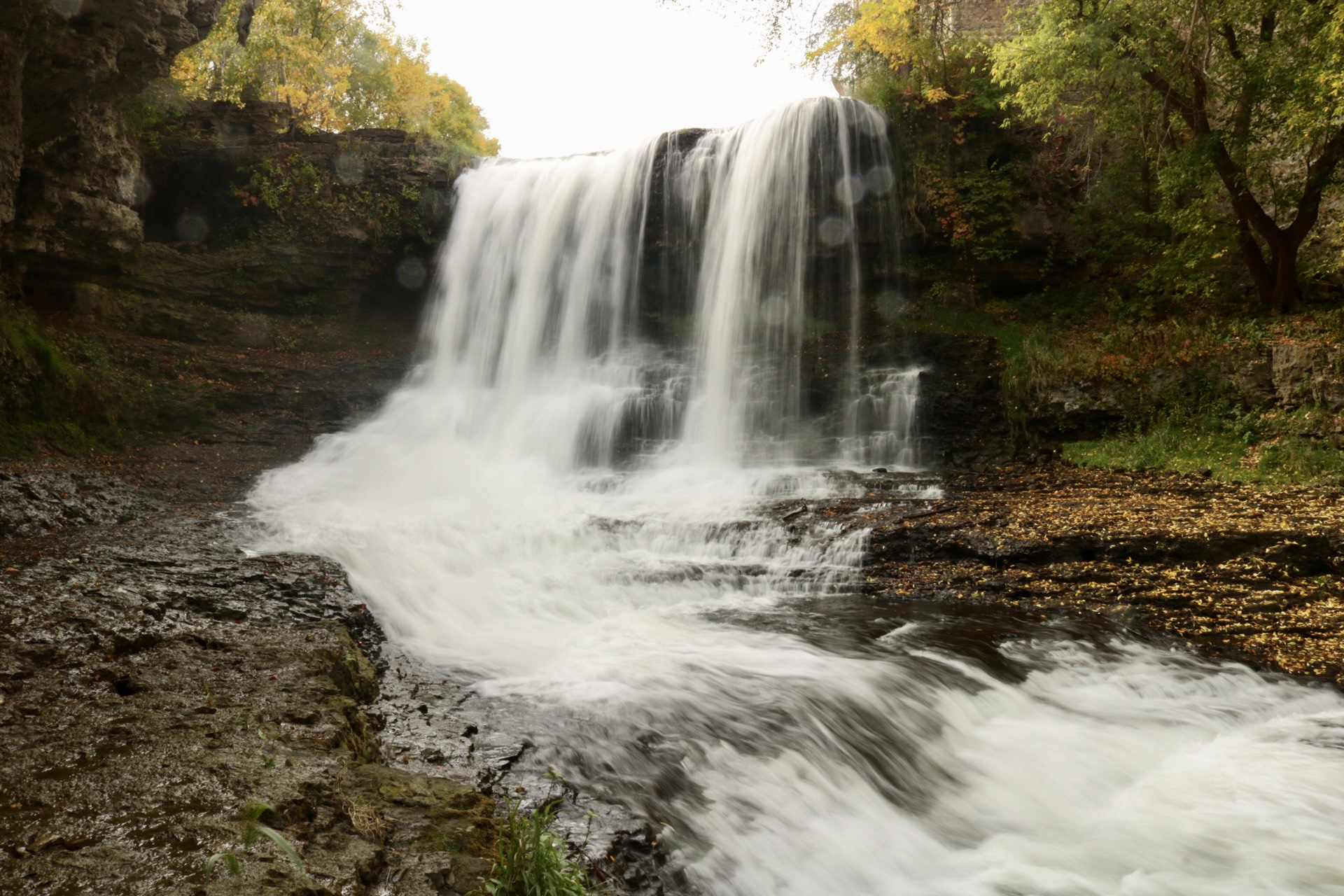
- Mississippi River and Hastings Bridge Fasbender Building William G. LeDuc House Ramsey Mill Ruins Vermillion Falls

- Location of the city of Hastings within Dakota County in the state of Minnesota
- Coordinates: 44°45′12″N 92°52′48″W
- Country: United States
- State: Minnesota
- Counties: Dakota, Washington
- Founded: 1853
- Incorporated: March 7, 1857

Government
  - Mayor: Mary Fasbender

Area
  - City: 11.20 sq mi (29.02 km^{2})
  - Land: 10.35 sq mi (26.81 km^{2})
  - Water: 0.85 sq mi (2.20 km^{2})
- Elevation: 801 ft (244 m)

Population (2020)
  - City: 22,154
  - Estimate (2022): 21,712
  - Density: 2,140/sq mi (826.2/km^{2})
  - Metro: 3,693,729
- Time zone: UTC–6 (Central (CST))
  - Summer (DST): UTC–5 (CDT)
- ZIP Code: 55033
- Area code: 651
- FIPS code: 27-27530
- GNIS feature ID: 2394320
- Website: hastingsmn.gov

Hastings (/ˈheɪstɪŋz/ HAY-stings) is a city mostly in Dakota County, Minnesota, of which it is the county seat, with a portion in Washington County, Minnesota, United States. It is near the confluence of the Mississippi, Vermillion, and St. Croix Rivers. The population was 22,154 at the 2020 census. It is named for the first elected governor of Minnesota, Henry Hastings Sibley. Hastings is part of the Minneapolis-Saint Paul metropolitan area.

The advantages of Hastings's location that led to its original growth are that it is well-drained, provides a good riverboat port, and is close to a hydropower resource at the falls of the Vermillion River. Other sites closer to the river confluence are either too swampy (Dakota County) or too hilly (Washington County and Pierce County, Wisconsin).

U.S. Highway 61 and Minnesota State Highways 55 and 316 are three of Hastings's main routes.

== History ==
In the winter of 1820, a military detachment from Fort Snelling settled the area around Hastings to guard a blocked shipment of supplies. Lieutenant William G. Oliver camped in an area that came to be known as Oliver's Grove; in 1833 a trading post was opened there. After the Treaty of Mendota of 1851 opened the area for white settlement, Oliver's Grove was surveyed and incorporated as a city in 1857, a year before Minnesota's admission to the Union. The same year, Hastings was named the county seat of Dakota County. The name "Hastings" was drawn out of a bucket from suggestions placed in it by several of the original founders.

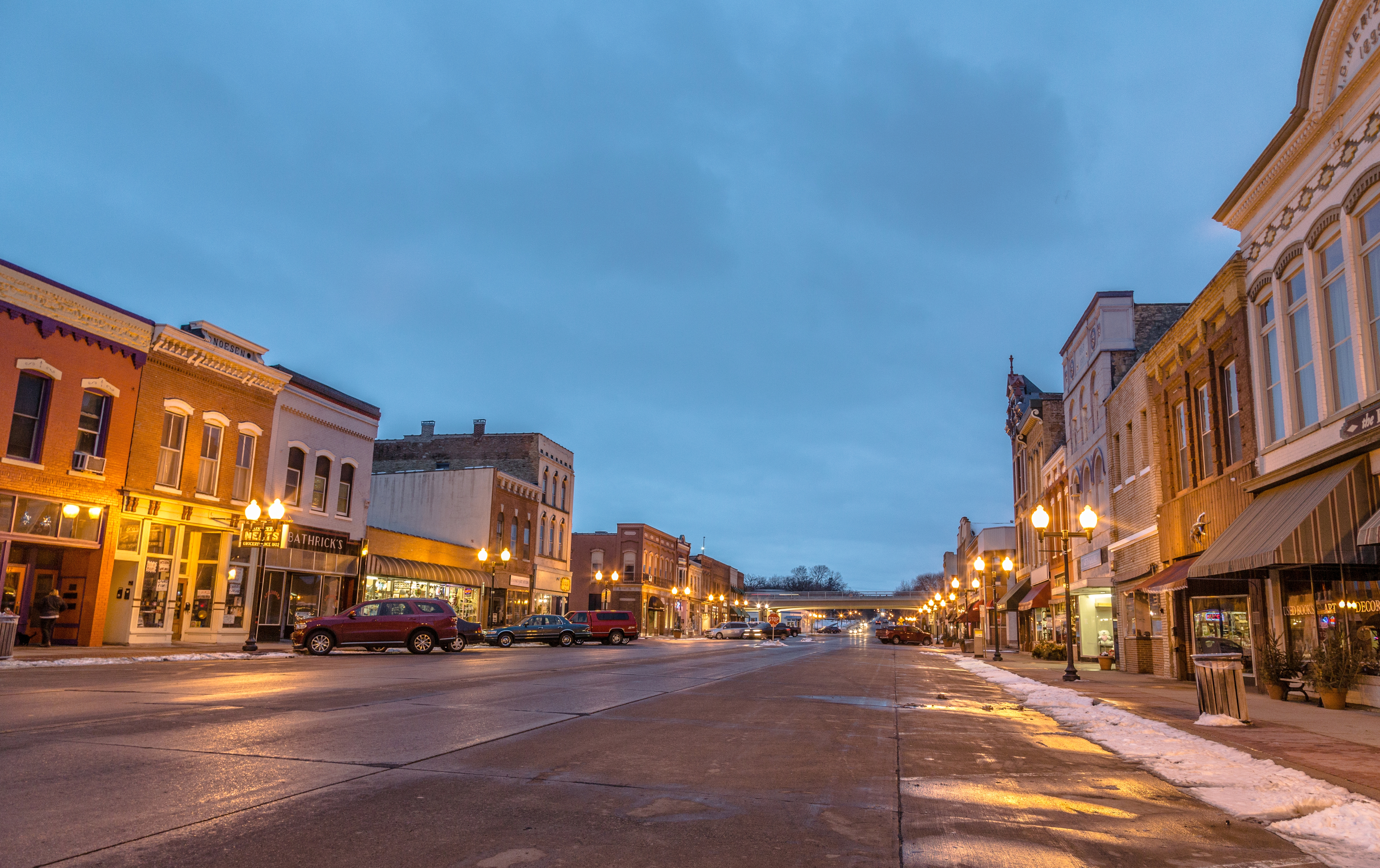
Downtown Hastings

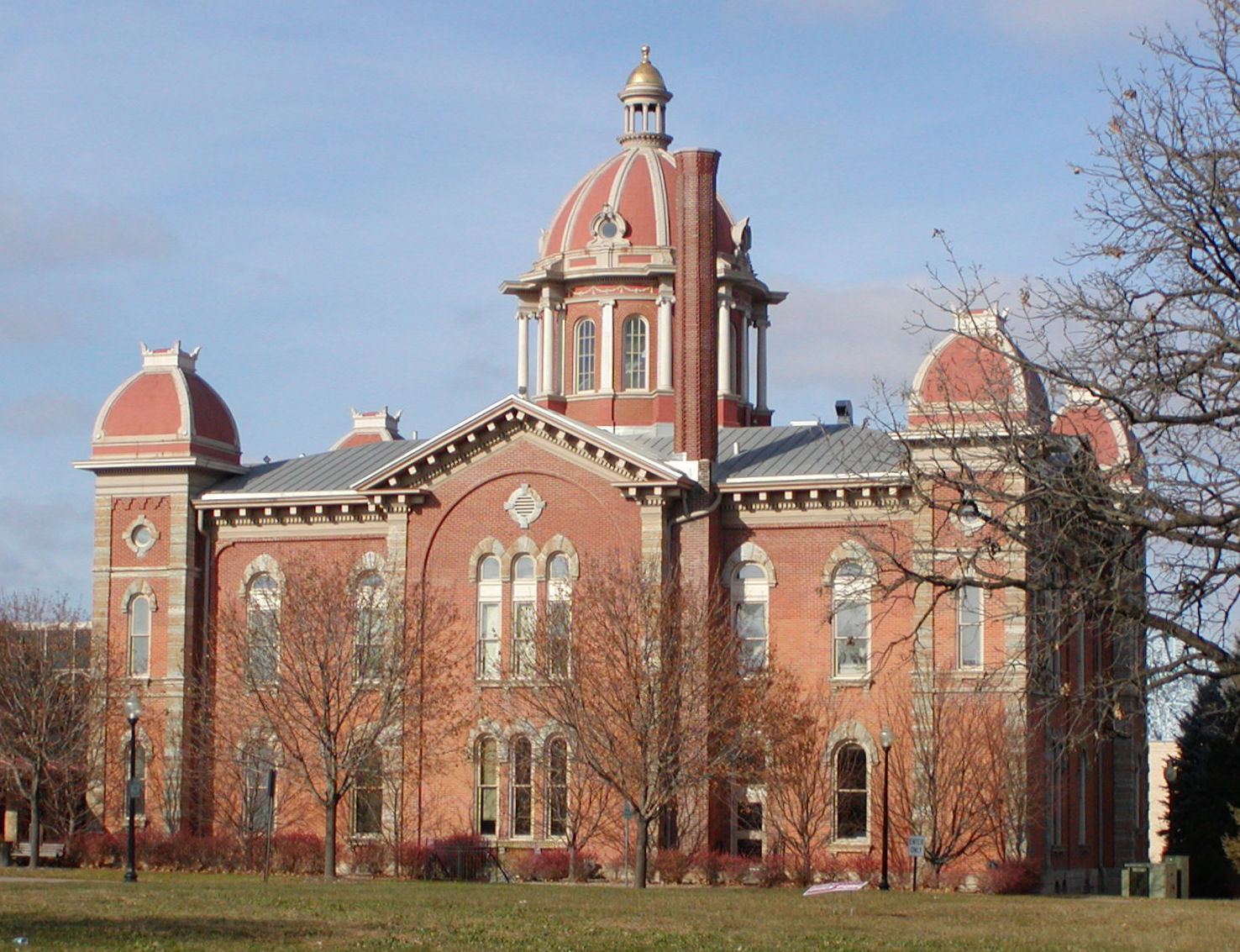
City Hall, originally the Dakota County Courthouse

In the mid-19th century, Hastings, Prescott, Wisconsin, and the adjacent township of Nininger were areas of tremendous land speculation. Ignatius L. Donnelly promoted the area as a potential "New Chicago." The Panic of 1857 put an end to this dream. The speculation and panic caused the cities' growth to be less than expected given their location at the confluence of two significant rivers; today, their combined population is approximately 25,000, and all that remains of Nininger is a few building ruins.

Hastings has Minnesota's second-oldest surviving county courthouse (after Washington County Courthouse, Stillwater), finished in 1871 at a cost of $63,000. The county administration began moving to a new facility in 1974, and in 1989 the City of Hastings purchased the old building. It was rededicated in 1993 as City Hall.

In 1895 a spiral bridge was built over the Mississippi River, designed to slow down horse-drawn traffic as it entered downtown. The novel design became a tourist attraction, but the bridge was demolished in 1951 because it could not handle modern vehicles. The 1951 bridge was itself demolished and its replacement opened in 2013.

In 1930, the Army Corps of Engineers completed Lock and Dam No. 2 at Hastings, part of the canal lock systems on the Mississippi that stretch from Minneapolis to St. Louis. Lock and Dam No. 2 is the site of the nation's first commercial, federally licensed hydrokinetic power facility, a partnership between the City of Hastings and Hydro Green Energy, LLC of Westmont, Illinois.

Fasbender Clinic, designed by Frank Lloyd Wright, is a city landmark.

=== Railroads ===
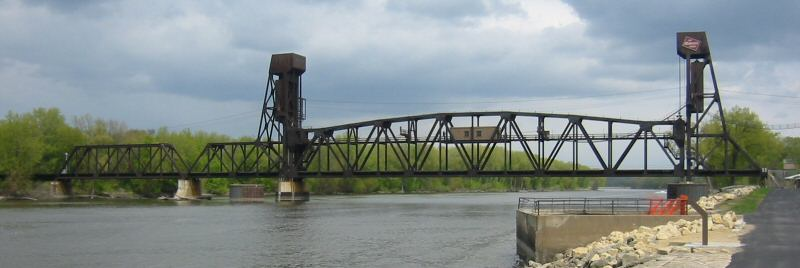
The Hastings Rail Bridge

Hastings's name was affixed to two major Minnesota railroads, the Hastings & Dakota Railway and the Stillwater & Hastings Railway.

In 1867 civic leaders William LeDuc, John Meloy, Stephen Gardner, E. D. Allen, and P. Van Auken—with financial backing from investors John B Alley, Oliver Ames, William Ames and Peter Butler—incorporated the Hastings & Dakota Railway with the goal to "cross the Rocky Mountains and meet the Pacific Ocean". In the 1870s the H&D was completed from Hastings to the South Dakota border at Ortonville. During this time, the H&D became part of the Chicago, Milwaukee & St. Paul Railroad (Milwaukee Road) and became known as the H&D Division of the Milwaukee Road. The H&D also built the famous "Lake Street Depression" in Minneapolis, which gave the H&D two districts around Minneapolis and St. Paul: the south district from Hastings to Cologne via Chaska, and the north district from Hastings to Cologne via St. Paul/Minneapolis. The H&D never made it to the Pacific on its own, but the H&D Division became the mainline of the Milwaukee's Coast Extension to Seattle, which the Milwaukee completed in 1909.

In 1880 a new branch line, the Stillwater & Hastings, was built between the two cities. It funneled logging and agriculture products from Stillwater to Hastings, allowing Hastings to become an important railroad switching hub. In 1882 the Milwaukee Road gained control of the S&H and operated it as a profitable branch line. The Milwaukee abandoned the S&H line in 1979, after 99 years of service.

The north H&D district remains intact from Minneapolis to Ortonville—except for the Lake Street Depression—and is operated by the Twin Cities & Western Railroad from Minneapolis to Hanley Falls and by BNSF Railway between Hanley Falls and Ortonville. Nearly all of the south H&D district was abandoned over time, with the last section between Shakopee and Cologne abandoned in the early 1970s. The Canadian Pacific Railway spur from downtown Hastings to the Ardent Mills mill atop Vermillion Falls is all that remains of the south H&D district. The old H&D trestle over the Vermillion River at Hastings—which was replaced four different times—is now part of a bicycle path. The H&D bridge over the Minnesota River at Chaska remained until 1995, when the Army Corps of Engineers removed it as the Chaska levees were rebuilt.

Canadian Pacific Railway now operates the former Milwaukee mainline through town as well as the Ardent Mills spur.

== Geography ==
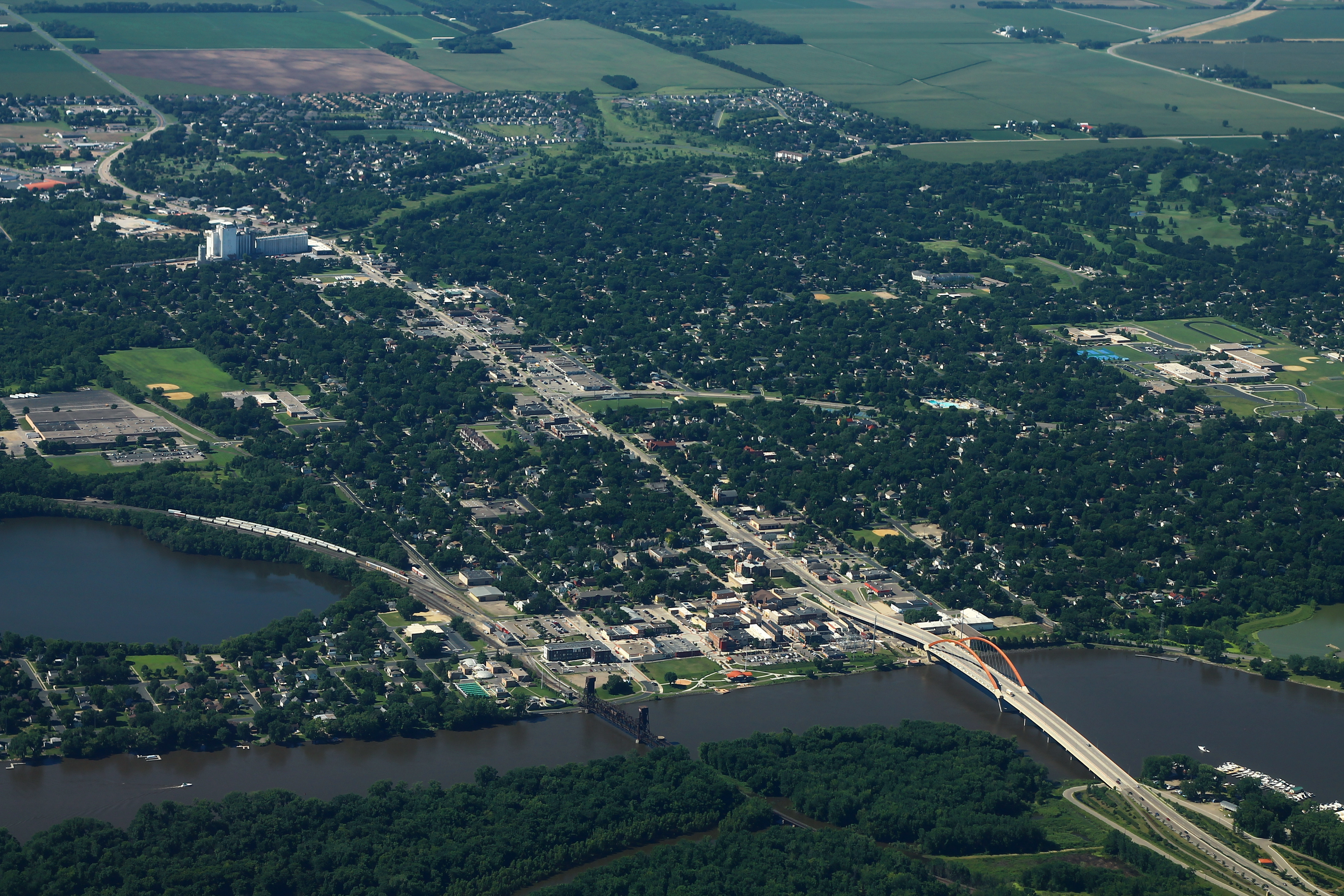
Aerial view of the City of Hastings

According to the United States Census Bureau, the city has an area of 11.18 square miles (28.96 km^{2}); 10.24 square miles (26.52 km^{2}) is land and 0.94 square miles (2.43 km^{2}) is water. The Mississippi River forms most of Hastings's northern border, while the Vermillion River flows through the southern part of town, over a falls adjacent to a ConAgra grain elevator. Bluffs lie along the northern shore of the Mississippi and there is a gorge surrounding the Vermillion below the falls. Hastings is home to two small lakes, Lake Rebecca and Lake Isabel. Both drain into the Mississippi River. The northeast corner of town, an area of soggy marshland and flood plain for the Mississippi and Vermillion Rivers, is known as "Cow Town".

Hastings is on the Mississippi side of the confluence with the St. Croix River, so that the St. Croix is "across" the Mississippi River. Prescott, Wisconsin is on the Wisconsin side of the confluence.

=== Climate ===
Climate data for Lock and Dam No. 2 (1991–2020 normals, extremes 1893–present)
Month	Jan	Feb	Mar	Apr	May	Jun	Jul	Aug	Sep	Oct	Nov	Dec	Year
Record high °F (°C)	54 (12)	62 (17)	80 (27)	91 (33)	96 (36)	100 (38)	101 (38)	97 (36)	94 (34)	92 (33)	78 (26)	68 (20)	101 (38)
Mean daily maximum °F (°C)	24.1 (−4.4)	29.0 (−1.7)	41.1 (5.1)	56.4 (13.6)	68.6 (20.3)	78.8 (26.0)	83.0 (28.3)	80.9 (27.2)	73.4 (23.0)	59.4 (15.2)	43.0 (6.1)	29.7 (−1.3)	55.6 (13.1)
Daily mean °F (°C)	14.9 (−9.5)	18.8 (−7.3)	31.4 (−0.3)	46.1 (7.8)	58.2 (14.6)	68.7 (20.4)	73.1 (22.8)	71.1 (21.7)	63.2 (17.3)	49.7 (9.8)	34.8 (1.6)	21.7 (−5.7)	46.0 (7.8)
Mean daily minimum °F (°C)	5.7 (−14.6)	8.7 (−12.9)	21.8 (−5.7)	35.7 (2.1)	47.8 (8.8)	58.6 (14.8)	63.3 (17.4)	61.3 (16.3)	53.1 (11.7)	40.0 (4.4)	26.6 (−3.0)	13.7 (−10.2)	36.4 (2.4)
Record low °F (°C)	−34 (−37)	−36 (−38)	−20 (−29)	8 (−13)	26 (−3)	38 (3)	47 (8)	42 (6)	32 (0)	18 (−8)	−8 (−22)	−25 (−32)	−36 (−38)
Average precipitation inches (mm)	0.90 (23)	0.91 (23)	1.78 (45)	3.10 (79)	4.33 (110)	4.94 (125)	4.37 (111)	4.23 (107)	3.21 (82)	2.61 (66)	1.72 (44)	1.23 (31)	33.33 (847)
Average precipitation days (≥ 0.01 in)	8.3	7.4	8.6	11.9	13.1	13.1	10.8	10.1	9.7	10.4	8.0	9.1	120.5
Source: NOAA

== Demographics ==
Historical population
Census	Pop.	Note	%±
1860	1,653		—
1870	3,458		109.2%
1880	3,809		10.2%
1890	3,705		−2.7%
1900	3,811		2.9%
1910	3,983		4.5%
1920	4,571		14.8%
1930	5,086		11.3%
1940	5,662		11.3%
1950	6,560		15.9%
1960	8,965		36.7%
1970	12,195		36.0%
1980	12,827		5.2%
1990	15,445		20.4%
2000	18,204		17.9%
2010	22,172		21.8%
2020	22,154		−0.1%
2022 (est.)	21,712		−2.0%
U.S. Decennial Census; 2020 Census

=== 2020 census ===
As of the 2020 census, Hastings had a population of 22,154. The median age was 40.7 years. 22.3% of residents were under the age of 18 and 18.7% of residents were 65 years of age or older. For every 100 females there were 97.9 males, and for every 100 females age 18 and over there were 96.1 males age 18 and over.

97.7% of residents lived in urban areas, while 2.3% lived in rural areas.

There were 9,129 households in Hastings, of which 28.9% had children under the age of 18 living in them. Of all households, 46.3% were married-couple households, 17.9% were households with a male householder and no spouse or partner present, and 27.5% were households with a female householder and no spouse or partner present. About 30.1% of all households were made up of individuals and 14.3% had someone living alone who was 65 years of age or older.

There were 9,390 housing units, of which 2.8% were vacant. The homeowner vacancy rate was 0.6% and the rental vacancy rate was 2.8%.

Racial composition as of the 2020 census
Race	Number	Percent
White	19,702	88.9%
Black or African American	546	2.5%
American Indian and Alaska Native	143	0.6%
Asian	262	1.2%
Native Hawaiian and Other Pacific Islander	11	0.0%
Some other race	270	1.2%
Two or more races	1,220	5.5%
Hispanic or Latino (of any race)	807	3.6%

=== 2010 census ===
As of the census of 2010, there were 22,172 people, 8,735 households, and 5,802 families residing in the city. The population density was 2,165.2 inhabitants per square mile (836.0/km^{2}). There were 9,222 housing units at an average density of 900.6 per square mile (347.7/km^{2}). The racial makeup of the city was 94.1% White, 1.6% African American, 0.5% Native American, 0.9% Asian, 0.8% from other races, and 2.1% from two or more races. Hispanic or Latino residents of any race were 2.6% of the population.

There were 8,735 households, of which 34.1% had children under the age of 18 living with them, 50.0% were married couples living together, 11.6% had a female householder with no husband present, 4.9% had a male householder with no wife present, and 33.6% were non-families. 27.7% of all households were made up of individuals, and 11.9% had someone living alone who was 65 years of age or older. The average household size was 2.45 and the average family size was 2.98.

The median age in the city was 37.5 years. 24.7% of residents were under the age of 18; 8.1% were between the ages of 18 and 24; 27.4% were from 25 to 44; 26.3% were from 45 to 64; and 13.6% were 65 years of age or older. The gender makeup of the city was 49.2% male and 50.8% female.

=== 2000 census ===
As of the census of 2000, there were 18,204 people, 6,642 households, and 4,722 families residing in the city. The population density was 1,798.2 inhabitants per square mile (694.3/km^{2}). There were 6,758 housing units at an average density of 667.6 per square mile (257.8/km^{2}). The racial makeup of the city was 97.16% White, 0.43% African American, 0.38% Native American, 0.64% Asian, 0.04% Pacific Islander, 0.36% from other races, and 0.99% from two or more races. Hispanic or Latino residents of any race were 1.14% of the population.

There were 6,642 households, out of which 37.4% had children under the age of 18 living with them, 56.8% were married couples living together, 10.6% had a female householder with no husband present, and 28.9% were non-families. 22.8% of all households were made up of individuals, and 8.5% had someone living alone who was 65 years of age or older. The average household size was 2.64 and the average family size was 3.13.

In the city, 27.3 % of the population was under the age of 18, 8.9% was from 18 to 24, 30.6% from 25 to 44, 21.5% from 45 to 64, and 11.7% was 65 years of age or older. The median age was 35 years. For every 100 females, there were 99.8 males. For every 100 females age 18 and over, there were 97.7 males.

The median income for a household in the city was $53,145, and the median income for a family was $61,093. Males had a median income of $41,267 versus $27,973 for females. The per capita income for the city was $22,075. About 2.1% of families and 4.9% of the population were below the poverty line, including 3.4% of those under age 18 and 9.8% of those age 65 or over.

== Arts and culture ==
=== Sites of interest ===
- Alexis Bailly Vineyard
- East Second Street Commercial Historic District
- Hastings High School
- Hastings Sand Coulee Scientific and Natural Area
- LeDuc Historic Estate
- Lock and Dam No. 2
- Ramsey Mill Ruins
- Spring Lake Park Reserve
- Vermillion Falls Park
- West Second Street Residential Historic District

== Government ==
Presidential election results

2020 Precinct Results Spreadsheet2016 Precinct Results Spreadsheet2012 Precinct Results Spreadsheet2008 Precinct Results Spreadsheet2004 Precinct Results Spreadsheet2000 Precinct Results Spreadsheet1996 Precinct Results1992 Precinct Results1988 Precinct Results1984 Precinct Results1980 Precinct Results1976 Precinct Results1968 Precinct Results1964 Precinct Results1960 Precinct Results
Year	Republican	Democratic	Third parties
2020	50.4% 6,701	46.8% 6,224	2.8% 375
2016	49.6% 5,946	40.6% 4,869	9.8% 1,177
2012	47.7% 5,773	49.7% 6,021	2.6% 322
2008	45.4% 5,535	52.1% 6,353	2.5% 313
2004	48.0% 5,490	50.7% 5,795	1.3% 147
2000	43.9% 3,930	49.5% 4,432	6.6% 597
1996	31.1% 2,297	55.9% 4,133	13.0% 967
1992	30.3% 2,426	44.6% 3,570	25.1% 2,001
1988	44.8% 3,059	55.2% 3,770	0.0% 0
1984	46.8% 3,008	53.2% 3,424	0.0% 0
1980	36.1% 2,319	54.5% 3,505	9.4% 603
1976	35.6% 2,096	62.0% 3,649	2.4% 141
1968	36.5% 1,486	60.0% 2,441	3.5% 141
1964	25.8% 1,074	74.0% 3.083	0.2% 8
1960	36.9% 1,338	62.9% 2,365	0.2% 7

== Education ==
Hastings Public Schools (Independent School District 200) operates public schools, including Hastings Senior High School, Hastings Middle School, and three elementary schools.

== Infrastructure ==
=== Transportation ===
Highways in Hastings include:

- U.S. Highway 61, also called Vermillion Street.
- Minnesota State Highway 55, the main east–west roadway.
- Highway 316
- Highway 291
- County roads 42, 46, 47, and 54.

Hastings is not served by the Metro Transit public transportation bus routes, but preliminary studies are underway to bring commuter rail to Hastings via the Red Rock Corridor. Amtrak trains pass through, but do not stop in Hastings (passengers must go to St. Paul or Red Wing to board).

The Mississippi River is a major thoroughfare for barges, which are helped upstream by Lock and Dam No. 2 in northwest Hastings. There are several access points to the Mississippi for private watercraft.

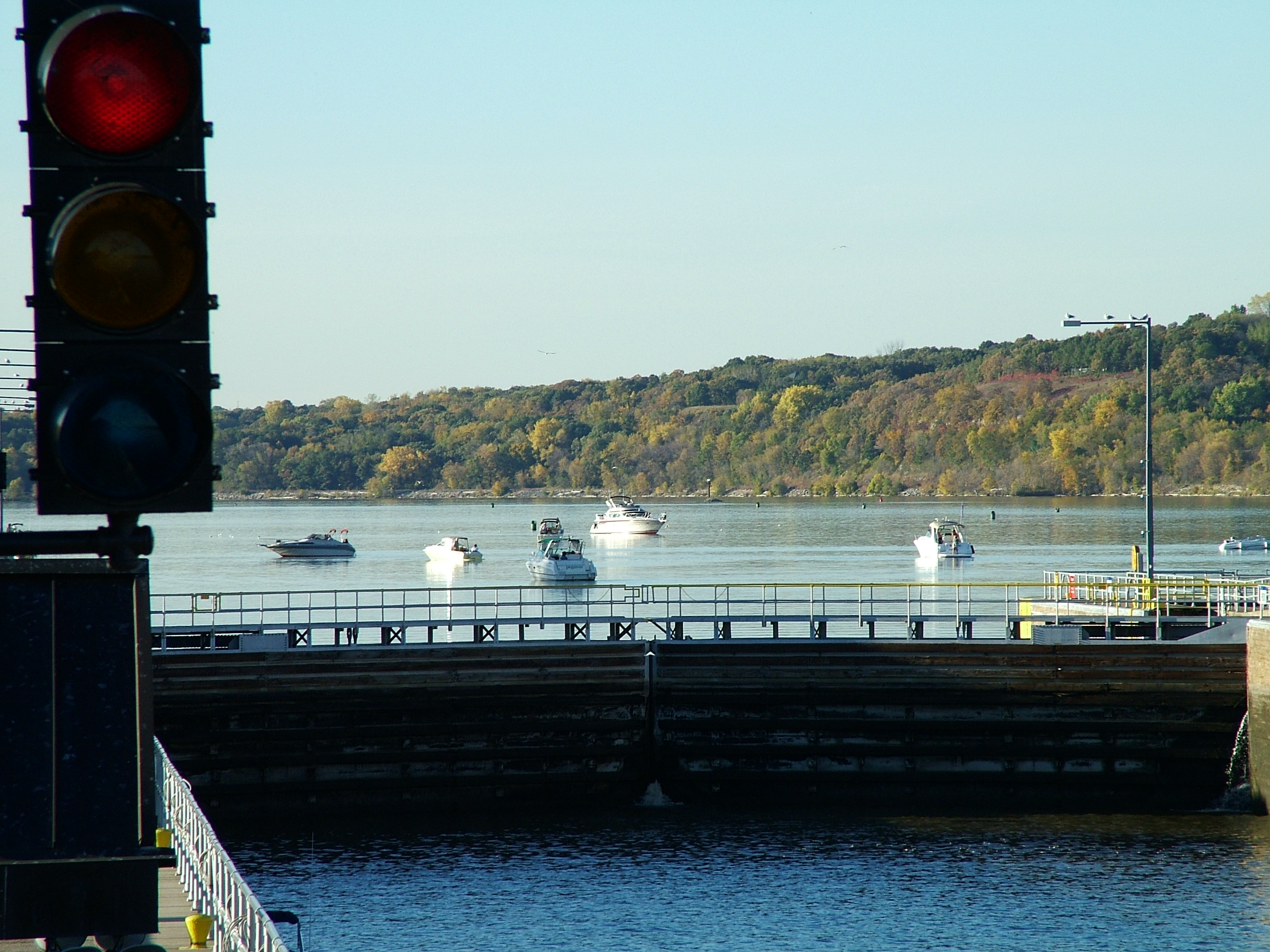
Boats lined up at Lock and Dam No. 2, Hastings, Minnesota

== Notable people ==
- Jackie Biskupski, mayor of Salt Lake City and former Utah state legislator
- Edie Boyer, American track & field athlete
- Taylor Chorney, professional hockey player for the Washington Capitals
- George Conzemius, Minnesota state senator and educator
- MaryJanice Davidson, author
- Gil Dobie, college football coach
- Mark Doten, novelist
- Aaron Fox, hockey player and coach
- Thomas K. Gibson, Wisconsin state senator
- Mark Steven Johnson, film director and writer
- Craig Kilborn, comedian and television personality
- Larry LaCoursiere, professional boxer
- Clara Mairs, painter and printmaker
- Dan Peltier, baseball player for the Texas Rangers
- Terry Redlin, painter
- Gertrud Roberts, composer and harpsichordist
- Jacob Rodriguez, professional NFL linebacker for the Miami Dolphins
- Harry Sieben, former speaker of the Minnesota House of Representatives
- Mike Sieben, former member in the Minnesota House of Representatives
- Katie Sieben, former member in the Minnesota Senate
- Derek Stepan, professional hockey player for the Carolina Hurricanes
- Jeff Taffe, professional hockey player
- Dean Talafous, former NHL hockey player
- Ben Utecht, professional football player and singer
- Daniel Welch, ice hockey forward who notably went five-hole in the high school state hockey championship in the final seconds
