= Anno Domini =

Calendar era based on the birth of Jesus

Today (at UTC+00)
- Thursday, 12 November 2026
- Gregorian: 12 November, AD 2026
- Julian: 30 October, AD 2026 (AM 7535)
Other calendars
Akan	Monoyaw
Armenian	25 Trē 1476
Aztec	Tlacaxipehualiztli 1, 8 Ocēlōtl
Babylonian	1 Arakhsamna, 2337 SE
Balinese pawukon	Luang, Pepet, Kajeng, Menala, Pon, Maulu, Wraspati of Landep, Yama, Dadi, Manuh
Bengali	27 Kartik, BS 1433
Chinese	Yang Metal Tiger・Horn Mansion; Fire Horse Year, Month 10, Day 4 (Lidong, 10 days until Xiaoxue)
Common Era	12 November 2026 CE
Coptic	3 Hathor, AM 1743
Egyptian	30 Phamenoth, 2775 NE
Ethiopian	3 H̱edār, 2019 Amätä Məhrät
French Republican	Décade III, Primidi de Brumaire de l'Année 235 de la République
Hebrew	2 Kislev, AM 5787
Hindu	Jyeṣṭhā・Atigaṇḍa; Solar: 26 Kārtika, 1948 SE; Lunisolar: Tr̥tīyā, Śukla pakṣa of Kārtika, 2083 VE; Rāudra・5127 KY・1,872,891
Icelandic	Fimmtudagur, 20 Gormánuður 2026
Islamic	1 Jumada al-thani, AH 1448 (using tabular method)
ISO week date	2026-W46-4
Japanese	4 Kannazuki, Reiwa 8 (Rittō, 10 days until Shōsetsu)
Julian day	2461357
Korean	4 Dwaejidal, 4359 DE
Maya	13.0.14.1.14; 7 Ceh, 8 Ix
Roman	ante diem III Kalendas Novembres, MMDCCLXXIX AUC
Solar Hijri	21 Aban, SH 1405
Tibetan	3 smin drug, me pho rta 2153 or 1772 or 1000

Anno Domini (AD) and before Christ (BC) qualify years in the Gregorian and Julian calendars, whose epoch is the traditional year of the conception or birth of Jesus. AD counts years since the epoch, BC the years before the epoch.

Anno Domini is Medieval Latin for "in the year of the Lord", often read as "our Lord". (Note: from "anno Domini nostri (Jesu Christi)" 'in the year of our Lord (Jesus Christ)') "BC" is specific to English, and equivalent abbreviations are used in other languages: the Latin form, rarely used in English, is ante Christum natum (ACN) or ante Christum (AC).

This calendar era takes as its epoch the traditionally reckoned year of the conception or birth of Jesus. Years AD are counted forward since that epoch and years BC are counted backward from the epoch. There is no year zero; the year AD 1 immediately follows the year 1 BC. The system was devised in 525, in Rome, by the Eastern Roman monk Dionysius Exiguus, but was not widely used until the 9th century. Modern scholars believe that the actual date of the birth of Jesus was about 5 BC.

To avoid religious associations, many writers and scholars prefer CE (Common Era) and BCE (Before the Common Era) instead of AD and BC.

Astronomical year numbering and ISO 8601 do not use words or abbreviations related to Christianity, but use the same numbers for AD years (but not for BC years since the astronomical year 0 is 1 BC).

== Usage ==
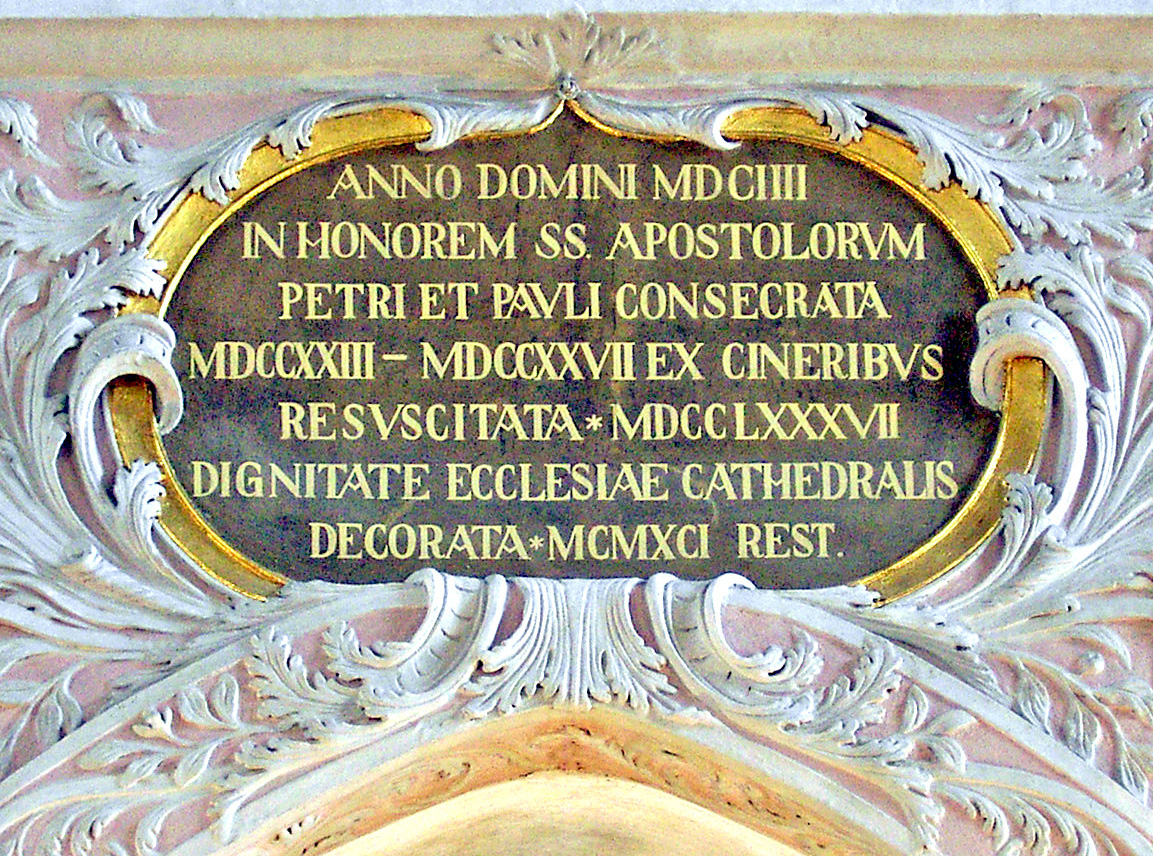
Anno Domini inscription at Klagenfurt Cathedral, Austria

Traditionally, English follows Latin usage by placing the "AD" abbreviation before the year number, though it is also found after the year. In contrast, "BC" is always placed after the year number (for example: 70 BC but AD 70), which preserves syntactic order. The abbreviation "AD" is also widely used after the number of a century or millennium, as in "fourth century AD" or "second millennium AD" (although conservative usage formerly rejected such expressions). Since "BC" is the English abbreviation for Before Christ, it is sometimes incorrectly concluded that AD means After Death (i.e., after the death of Jesus; but that would mean that the approximately 33 years commonly associated with the life of Jesus would be included in neither BC nor AD).

== History ==
The anno Domini dating system was devised in 525 by Dionysius Exiguus to enumerate years in his Easter table, hence the name Dionysian era. His system was to replace the Diocletian era that had been used in older Easter tables, as he did not wish to continue the memory of a tyrant who persecuted Christians. The last year of the old table, Diocletian Anno Martyrium 247, was immediately followed by the first year of his table, anno Domini 532. When Dionysius devised his table, Julian calendar years were identified by naming the consuls who held office that year—Dionysius stated that the "present year" was "the consulship of Probus Junior", which was 525 years "since the incarnation of our Lord Jesus Christ". Thus, Dionysius implied that Jesus' incarnation occurred 525 years earlier, without stating the specific year during which his birth or conception occurred. "However, nowhere in his exposition of his table does Dionysius relate his epoch to any other dating system, whether consulate, Olympiad, year of the world, or regnal year of Augustus; much less does he explain or justify the underlying date."

Bonnie J. Blackburn and Leofranc Holford-Strevens briefly present arguments for 2 BC, 1 BC, or AD 1 as the year Dionysius intended for the Nativity or incarnation. Among the sources of confusion are:

- In modern times, incarnation is synonymous with the conception, but some ancient writers, such as Bede, considered incarnation to be synonymous with the Nativity.
- The civil or consular year began on 1 January, but the Diocletian year began on 1 September.
- There were inaccuracies in the lists of consuls.
- There were confused summations of emperors' regnal years.

It is not known how Dionysius established the year of Jesus's birth. One theory is that Dionysius based his calculation on the Gospel of Luke, which states that Jesus was "about thirty years old" shortly after "the fifteenth year of the reign of Tiberius Caesar", and hence subtracted thirty years from that date. This method was probably the one used by ancient historians such as Tertullian, Eusebius or Epiphanius, all of whom agree that Jesus was born in 2 BC, probably following this statement of Jesus' age (i.e. subtracting thirty years from AD 29).

Another major theory asserts that Dionysius counted back 532 years from the first year of his new table, following an 532-year cycle established by the astronomical computations of Victorius of Aquitaine (the dates for Easter repeat every 532 years). Alternatively, Dionysius may have used an earlier unknown source, as the earlier Chronograph of 354 states that Jesus was born during the consulship of Caesar and Paullus (AD 1).

It has also been speculated by Georges Declercq that Dionysius' desire to replace Diocletian years with a calendar based on the incarnation of Christ was intended to prevent people from believing the imminent end of the world. At the time, it was believed by some that the resurrection of the dead and end of the world would occur 500 years after the birth of Jesus. The old Anno Mundi calendar theoretically commenced with the creation of the world based on information in the Hebrew Bible. It was believed that, based on the Anno Mundi calendar, Jesus was born in the year 5500 (5500 years after the world was created) with the year 6000 of the Anno Mundi calendar marking the end of the world. Anno Mundi 6000 (approximately AD 500) was thus equated with the end of the world but this date had already passed in the time of Dionysius. The "Historia Brittonum" attributed to Nennius written in the 9th century makes extensive use of the Anno Passionis (AP) dating system which was in common use as well as the newer AD dating system. The AP dating system took its start from 'The Year of The Passion'. It is generally accepted by experts there is a 27-year difference between AP and AD reference.

The date of birth of Jesus of Nazareth is not stated in the gospels or in any secular text, but most scholars assume a date of birth between 6 BC and 4 BC. The historical evidence is too fragmentary to allow a definitive dating, but the date is estimated through two different approaches—one by analyzing references to known historical events mentioned in the Nativity accounts in the Gospels of Luke and Matthew and the second by working backwards from the estimation of the start of the ministry of Jesus.

=== Popularization ===
The Anglo-Saxon historian Bede, who was familiar with the work of Dionysius Exiguus, used anno Domini dating in his Ecclesiastical History of the English People, which he completed in AD 731. In the History he also used the Latin phrase ante [...] incarnationis dominicae tempus anno sexagesimo ("in the sixtieth year before the time of the Lord's incarnation"), which is equivalent to the English "before Christ", to identify years before the first year of this era. Both Dionysius and Bede regarded anno Domini as beginning at the incarnation of Jesus Christ, but "the distinction between Incarnation and Nativity was not drawn until the late 9th century, when in some places the Incarnation epoch was identified with Christ's conception, i. e., the Annunciation on March 25" ("Annunciation style" dating).

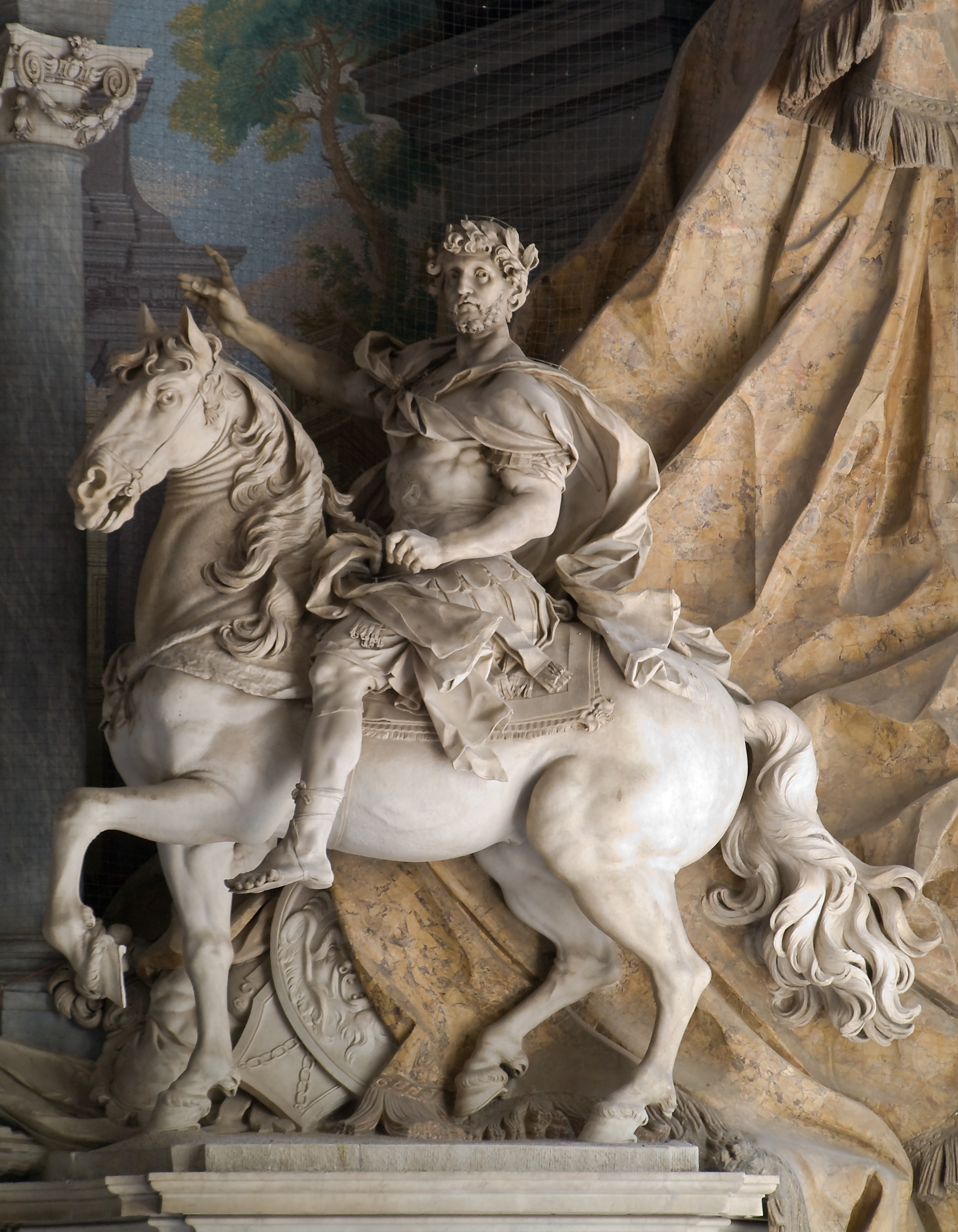
Statue of Charlemagne by Agostino Cornacchini (1725), at St. Peter's Basilica, Vatican City. Charlemagne promoted the usage of the anno Domini epoch throughout the Carolingian Empire.

On the continent of Europe, anno Domini was introduced as the era of choice of the Carolingian Renaissance by the English cleric and scholar Alcuin in the late eighth century. Its endorsement by Emperor Charlemagne and his successors popularizing the use of the epoch and spreading it throughout the Carolingian Empire ultimately lies at the core of the system's prevalence. According to the Catholic Encyclopedia, popes continued to date documents according to regnal years for some time, but usage of AD gradually became more common in Catholic countries from the 11th to the 14th centuries. In 1422, Portugal became the last Western European country to switch to the system begun by Dionysius. Eastern Orthodox countries only began to adopt AD instead of the Byzantine calendar in 1700 when Russia did so, with others adopting it in the 19th and 20th centuries.

Although anno Domini was in widespread use by the 9th century, the term "Before Christ" (or its equivalent) did not become common until much later. Bede used the expression "anno [...] ante incarnationem Dominicam" (in the year before the incarnation of the Lord) twice. "Anno ante Christi nativitatem" (in the year before the birth of Christ) is found in 1474 in a work by a German monk. (Note: Werner Rolevinck in Fasciculus temporum (1474) used Anno ante xpi nativitatem (in the year before the birth of Christ) for all years between creation and Jesus. "xpi" comes from the Greek χρ (chr) in visually Latin letters, together with the Latin ending -i, thus abbreviating Christi ("of Christ"). This phrase appears upside down in the centre of recto folios (right hand pages). From Jesus to Pope Sixtus IV he usually used Anno Christi or its abbreviated form Anno xpi (on verso folios—left hand pages). He used Anno mundi alongside all of these terms for all years.) In 1627, the French Jesuit theologian Denis Pétau (Dionysius Petavius in Latin), with his work De doctrina temporum, popularized the usage ante Christum (Latin for "Before Christ") to mark years prior to AD.

=== New year ===
When the reckoning from Jesus' incarnation began replacing the previous dating systems in western Europe, various people chose different Christian feast days to begin the year: Christmas, Annunciation, or Easter. Thus, depending on the time and place, the year number changed on different days in the year, which created slightly different styles in chronology:

- From 25 March 753 AUC (1 BC), i.e., notionally from the incarnation of Jesus, nine months before Christmas. This "Annunciation style" first appeared in Arles at the end of the 9th century then spread to Burgundy and northern Italy. It was not commonly used and was called calculus pisanus [the Pisan calculation] since it was adopted in Pisa and survived there until 1750.
- From 25 December 753 AUC (1 BC), i.e., notionally from the birth of Jesus. It was called "Nativity style" and had been spread by Bede together with the anno Domini in the early Middle Ages. This reckoning of the Year of Grace from Christmas was used in France, England and most of western Europe (except Spain) until the 12th century (when it was replaced by Annunciation style) and in Germany until the second quarter of the 13th century.
- From 25 March 754 AUC (AD 1). That second "Annunciation style" may have originated in Fleury Abbey in the early 11th century, but it was spread by the Cistercians. Florence adopted that style in opposition to that of Pisa, so it got the name of calculus florentinus. It soon spread in France and also in England where it became common in the late 12th century and lasted until 1752.
- From Easter. This mos gallicanus [French custom] bound to a moveable feast was introduced in France by king Philip Augustus (r. 1180–1223), maybe to establish a new style in the provinces reconquered from England. However, it never spread beyond the ruling élite.

With these various styles, the same day could, in some cases, be dated in 1099, 1100 or 1101.

== Other Christian and European eras ==
During the first six centuries of what would come to be known as the Christian era, European countries used various systems to count years. Systems in use included consular dating, imperial regnal year dating, and Creation dating.

Although the last non-imperial consul, Basilius, was appointed in 541 by Emperor Justinian I, later emperors through to Constans II (641–668) were appointed consuls on the first of January after their accession. All of these emperors, except Justinian, used imperial post-consular years for the years of their reign, along with their regnal years. Long unused, this practice was not formally abolished until Novell XCIV of the law code of Leo VI did so in 888.

Another calculation had been developed by the Alexandrian monk Annianus around the year AD 400, placing the Annunciation on 25 March AD 9 (Julian)—eight to ten years after the date that Dionysius was to imply. Although this incarnation was popular during the early centuries of the Byzantine Empire, years numbered from it, an Era of Incarnation, were exclusively used and are still used in Ethiopia. This accounts for the seven- or eight-year discrepancy between the Gregorian and Ethiopian calendars.

Byzantine chroniclers like Maximus the Confessor, George Syncellus, and Theophanes dated their years from Annianus' creation of the world. This era, called Anno Mundi, "year of the world" (abbreviated AM), by modern scholars, began its first year on 25 March 5492 BC. Later Byzantine chroniclers used Anno Mundi years from 1 September 5509 BC, the Byzantine Era. No single Anno Mundi epoch was dominant throughout the Christian world. Eusebius of Caesarea in his Chronicle used an era beginning with the birth of Abraham, dated in 2016 BC (AD 1 = 2017 Anno Abrahami).

Spain and Portugal continued to date by the Spanish Era (also called Era of the Caesars), which began counting from 38 BC, well into the Middle Ages. In 1422, Portugal became the last Catholic country to adopt the anno Domini system.

The Era of Martyrs, which numbered years from the accession of Diocletian in 284, who launched the most severe persecution of Christians, was used by the Church of Alexandria and is still officially used by the Coptic Orthodox and Coptic Catholic churches. It was also used by the Ethiopian and Eritrean churches. Another system was to date from the crucifixion of Jesus, which as early as Hippolytus and Tertullian was believed to have occurred in the consulate of the Gemini (AD 29), which appears in some medieval manuscripts.

== CE and BCE ==
Alternative names for the anno Domini era include vulgaris aerae (found 1615 in Latin), "Vulgar Era" (in English, as early as 1635), (Note: The word vulgar originally meant "of the ordinary people", distinguishing it from the regnal date (years since the coronation of the monarch).) "Christian Era" (in English, in 1652), "Common Era" (in English, 1708), and "Current Era".

The "Common/Current Era" ("CE") terminology is often preferred by those who desire a term that does not explicitly make religious references but still uses the same epoch as the anno Domini notation. For example, Cunningham and Starr (1998) write that "B.C.E./C.E. […] do not presuppose faith in Christ and hence are more appropriate for interfaith dialog than the conventional B.C./A.D." Upon its foundation, the Republic of China adopted the Minguo Era but used the Western calendar for international purposes. The translated term was 西元 (xī yuán; 'Western Era'). Later, in 1949, the People's Republic of China adopted 公元 (gōngyuán; 'Common Era') for all purposes domestic and foreign.

== No year zero: start and end of a century ==
In the AD system, AD 1 is immediately preceded by 1 BC: there is no year zero. Most experts agree that new decades, centuries, and millennia begin on a year ending in one, but the general public is divided.

For computational reasons, astronomical year numbering and the ISO 8601 standard designate years so that AD 1 = year 1, 1 BC = year 0, 2 BC = year −1, etc. (Note: To convert from a year BC to astronomical year numbering, reduce the absolute value of the year by 1, and prefix it with a negative sign (unless the result is zero). For years AD, omit the AD and prefix the number with a plus sign (plus sign is optional if it is clear from the context that the year is after the year 0).) In common usage, ancient dates are expressed in the Julian calendar, but ISO 8601 uses the Gregorian calendar and astronomers may use a variety of time scales depending on the application. Thus dates using the year 0 or negative years may require further investigation before being converted to BC or AD.

== See also ==
- Astronomical year numbering – Year numbering system using 0 for 1 BC
- Before Present – Time scale used in scientific disciplines
- Calendar – System for organizing days
- Holocene calendar – Calendar era that uses 10,000 BC as 1 HE
