= The Courts of Idleness =

1920 short story collection by Dornford Yates

- 1942 Ward Lock reprint
- Author: Dornford Yates
- Cover artist: Salomon van Abbé
- Series: Berry books
- Genre: Short stories
- Publisher: Ward Lock & Co
- Publication date: 1920
- Media type: Print
- Pages: 320
- Preceded by: The Brother of Daphne
- Followed by: Berry and Co.

The Courts of Idleness is a 1920 collection of comic short stories by the English author Dornford Yates (Cecil William Mercer), his second book. Half of the tales feature his 'Berry' characters.

== Contents ==
The book includes two main collections of short stories: Book I: How Some Passed Out of The Courts for Ever which consists mainly of pre-war frivolities, and Book II: How Others Left the Courts Only to return which relates post-war tales. Dividing the groups is a single-story “Interlude”.

The first story of Book I has the characters in London, after which they proceed to the island of Rih (a thinly-disguised Madeira). The final story concludes with the sudden end of the male characters, now serving in the Great War, who hear a sound which some interpret as a ship's siren and others as the sound of a heavy gun. A moment later, all are killed in the crater of a great shell.

The Interlude features a unique set of characters, initially in Scotland on the opening day of the Great War, and subsequently on the Western Front.

The stories of Book II return to the entirely different 'Berry' set of characters from The Brother of Daphne collection, with the addition of Adèle Feste, an American. The first two stories of this Book immediately follow those of the earlier collection. Next come three stories set at the end of the war in which the Berry & Co. characters meet in Egypt and, joined by Adèle, travel home via Rome. The volume closes with a final story, "Nemesis”, in which Berry and Boy are back in London.

== Background ==
The stories of Book I were published monthly in The Windsor Magazine in 1914 and 1915, with the final story (which concludes during the War on the Macedonian front, where Mercer himself served) being published in June 1919.

The first two stories of Book II were published in the Windsor in August and September 1914, the remaining four not appearing until 1919. The latter are partly set in Egypt, where Mercer had also served. The final story, "Nemesis", was originally intended for Punch and is shorter than the normal Windsor stories. In the Windsor version the protagonist is named Jeremy, but for the book this was changed to Berry.

After being released from war service and returning home, Mercer decided not to return to his pre-war work at the bar, but to concentrate on writing.

== Chapters ==
Book I - How Some Passed Out Of The Courts For Ever
Chapter	Title	Windsor Date	Volume	Issue	Pages	Illustrator
I	What's In A Name ?	December 1914	XLI	240	149-158	G C Wilmshurst
II	A Sister Ship	January 1915	XLI	241	250-258	G C Wilmshurst
III	To Seat Four	February 1915	XLI	242	389-398	G C Wilmshurst
IV	Love Thirty	March 1915	XLI	243	510-518	G C Wilmshurst
V	For Better Or For Worse	June 1919	L	294	17-26	Norah Schlegel

Interlude
Chapter	Title	Windsor Date	Volume	Issue	Pages	Illustrator
	And The Other Left	November 1914	XL	239	661-671	Charles J Crombie

Book II - How Others Left The Courts Only To Return
Chapter	Title	Windsor Date	Volume	Issue	Pages	Illustrator
I	A Bébé In Arms	August 1914	XL	236	321-327	G C Wilmshurst
II	Contempt Of Court	September 1914	XL	237	429-436	G C Wilmshurst
III	Beauty Repeats Itself	July 1919	L	295	97-107	Norah Schlegel
IV	The Desert Air	August 1919	L	296	181-192	Norah Schlegel
V	As Rome Does	September 1919	L	297	275-284	Norah Schlegel
VI	Nemesis	November 1919	L	299	483-486	Howard K Elcock

== Illustrations ==
The illustrations from The Windsor stories were not included in the book version, although one of the illustrations by Norah Schlegel (1879-1963) from "For Better Or For Worse" was used to illustrate the dustjacket of the first edition.

Norah Schlegel illustration

== Dedications ==
- 1921 - "To Her. Whose voice is melody, Whose grace is perfection, Whose understanding is infinite. My Lady Paramount"
- 1929 - "To My Lady Paramount"
- 1942 - "To the countryside of England, the hanging forests of Austria, and the tilted, flower-starred meadows of the Pyrenees."

== Critical reception ==
The review in the September 1920 edition of Punch was much less enthusiastic than that for the author's first collection, The Brother of Daphne: "The main object of the characters in The Courts of Idleness (Ward, Lock) was to amuse themselves, and as their sprightly conversations were often punctuated by laughter I take it that they succeeded. To give Mr Dornford Yates his due he is expert in light banter; but some three hundred pages of such entertainment tend to create a sense of surfeit." The reviewer ended on a more positive note, saying "Mr Yates can be strongly recommended to anyone who thinks that the British take themselves too seriously", a quotation that Ward Lock used on the rear covers of many of the author's later volumes.

== Bibliography ==
- Smithers, AJ (1982). Dornford Yates. London: Hodder and Stoughton. ISBN 0-340-27547-2.
- Usborne, Richard (1974). Clubland Heroes. London: Barrie & Jenkins. ISBN 0-214-20012-4.
