= Fine Prints of the Year =

Book series on printmaking

Fine Prints of the Year. An Annual Review of Contemporary Etching and Engraving
- Author: Malcolm Charles Salaman 1923-1935; Campbell Dodgson 1936-1938
- Country: Great Britain and U.S.A.
- Language: English
- Publisher: London: Halton & Truscott Smith (1923-1938); New York: Minton, Balch & Company (1925-1938)
- Published: 1923–1938
- No. of books: 16 annual volumes

Fine Prints of the Year was an annual series of books that reported and discussed the etchings, engravings, woodcuts and lithographs published each year between 1923 and 1938 by major artists of the period. All volumes reproduced in monochrome on high quality glossy paper a selection of about 100 limited edition prints published during the preceding year. The series provides an important record of the work of artists in the last years of the etching revival and during the collapse of the market for prints.

== History ==
The first volume of Fine Prints of the Year was published in London in 1924 by Halton and Truscott Smith as a review of the prints issued during the year up to October, 1923. The volume reproduced 150 etchings, drypoints, lithographs or woodcuts by major British and American printmakers of the day such as Stanley Anderson, Frank Benson, Edmund Blampied, Frank Brangwyn, Gerald Brockhurst, F.L. Griggs, Childe Hassam, James McBey, Henry Rushbury, Frank Short and William Walcot as well as the work of many artists whose work is less well known. Some copies of volume two, for the year 1924, contained as a frontispiece an unsigned, original etching by Frank Brangwyn. From the third volume Fine Prints of the Year was also published in the US by Minton, Balch and Company of New York.

The first 13 volumes, from 1923 to 1935, contained an introductory essay by Malcolm Salaman, an art critic and Honorary Fellow of the Royal Society of Painter-Etchers and Engravers, now the Royal Society of Painter-Printmakers. From 1936 to 1938 the introduction was provided by Campbell Dodgson, who was Keeper of Prints and Drawings at the British Museum. From 1926 to 1930 each volume contained a short introduction to American prints by Helen Fagg; from 1931 to 1934 the introduction was written by Susan A. Hutchinson.

From the second volume, published in 1924, the series also published a directory of the publishers of prints and a directory of the name and address of the etchers, engravers and lithographers then working in Great Britain, France, the United States of America and elsewhere with the titles, dimensions, publishers and sometimes with the prices of the prints designed or released by each artist during the previous year. This constitutes an important record of the work of many artists which, until the print boom ended in around 1930, were seen as an investment and were the subject of substantial trading and inflated prices. For example, an etching entitled Mersea, Sunset by James McBey, whose work was highly sought after in the 1920s, was issued to subscribers in an edition of 76 artist's proofs in 1926 at a price of 10 guineas. A proof of this print from the edition of 76 was sold at auction at Sotheby's in December of the same year for just under 105 guineas, a ten times higher price.

The Wall Street crash in the US and the worldwide Great Depression greatly diminished the market for prints, but many artists continued to design plates, though fewer in number, in smaller editions and at lower prices, as the volumes of Fine Prints of the Year between 1930 and 1938 show. For example, the artist Edmund Blampied issued 76 etchings between 1920 and 1929, typically in editions of 100 proofs, but in the following decade only published 23 etchings, some in editions of less than 50 proofs.

Fine Prints of the Year continued as a record of the work of etchers and engravers until the sixteenth and last annual volume for 1938, just before the start of the Second World War in Europe brought about rationing of paper and presumably put an end to the series. The 16 volumes published in the series reproduced over 1,700 prints and remains an important visual and factual record of the work of etchers and engravers, many of whom were once well known and whose prints commanded high prices.
