= Cecil Hunt =

English journalist, editor, novelist and anthologist (1902–1954)

Horace Cecil Hunt (13 September 1902 – 13 July 1954) was an English journalist, editor, novelist and anthologist, who is best known for his collections of unintended errors made by British schoolchildren in their examinations and written work, commonly known as 'howlers'.

== Biography ==
Hunt was born in London and educated at Southgate County School, now known as Southgate School, then at King's College, London, where he studied journalism. He started work in the insurance business but wrote articles for newspapers until he was offered a job by the publishing company of Ernest Benn Limited to edit periodicals such as The Chemical Age and The Fruit Grocer. In 1928 Benn published Hunt's first collection of ‘Howlers’ to great success and he followed these up with several other collections in the late 1930s for the publisher Methuen. For example: 'An epistle is the wife of an apostle'; 'Two crotchets make a quaker'; 'Lourdes is a cricket ground in London'; and 'Parsimony is money left by your father.

In 1930, Hunt joined the staff of the Daily Mail newspaper, for whom he was soon appointed fiction editor. During the 1930s, he wrote several novels under his own name and two using the pseudonyms Robert Payne and John Devon. The reason for using two pseudonyms for the same two novels is unclear, but may have occurred because of a clash with another writer also named Robert Payne. Hunt also wrote guides to journalism, publishing and writing stories; books on the origins of words and ceremonies; collections of unintentionally funny letters, epitaphs, last words, jokes, amusing notices and signs; and collections of questions for use in quizzes on topics such as music, books and sport. Hunt was latterly editor of children's fiction for Raphael Tuck until poor eyesight forced him to retire.

Hunt collaborated with two notable artists. First, with Edmund Blampied, who illustrated three collections of children's howlers and an anthology of proverbs. He also collaborated with W. Heath Robinson on three illustrated books published during the Second World War, all illustrated with Robinson's typically complicated and fanciful contraptions.

Hunt was Chairman then President of the London Writer Circle and was instrumental in establishing Swanwick writers' summer school becoming its first chairman in 1949

Hunt married Kathleen Dykes (1904–2011) in 1926, and they had two sons, Peter (1927–2009) and David (1930–1998). He died in London.
