= Swanwick writers' summer school =

Writer's conference

The Writers' Summer School
- Genre: Writers' conference
- Frequency: Annually
- Venue: The Hayes Conference Centre
- Locations: Swanwick, Derbyshire
- Country: United Kingdom
- Inaugurated: 1949
- Website: www.swanwickwritersschool.org.uk

The Swanwick Writers' Summer School is an annual writers' conference held at The Hayes Conference Centre, near Swanwick, Derbyshire. Founded in 1948, and first held in the summer of 1949, it is believed to be the oldest independent writers' school in the world.

== Background ==
Established as a charity and run on a not for profit basis, it was inspired by the London Writers Circle. Early celebrities that featured at the School included, Vera Brittain, L.P. Hartley, Hammond Innes and Arthur C. Clarke

The first chairman was Cecil Hunt, a chairman of the London Writers' Circle. Early delegates included the booker prize nominee, Barbara Pym, one of whose novels, No Fond Return of Love, is inspired, in part, by Swanwick itself. Associated with the school for over fifteen years as member, host and lecturer was Booker Prize Winner Paul Scott. He refers to the role Swanwick plays in creative writing in his published essays.

Over the years Swanwick has played an important role in the social development of creative writing.

== The School ==
Established postwar, it formed part of the continuing process of democratization of writing begun by many amateur groups in the 1920s and 1930s. From its founding in 1948, the aim of the school has been to provide a social and educational framework for the development of creative writing skills. Its role in the establishment of creative writing in the UK has meant that it has been a platform for eminent speakers, from Hammond Innes in 1952 to Sir Terry Pratchett. It has also been closely associated with the development of women's writing. Members range from seasoned authors with numerous published books to those new to writing. The inclusive community is designed to enable the sharing of experiences, best practice and support for individual writers' creative writing.

Derbyshire Record Office houses the school's historical records, reflecting its importance in the development of creative writing in the UK. These archives (ref: D5886) include the school minutes; comment books and correspondence.

== Authors ==
Noted authors who have been members of the school over the years include Eleanor Burford, John Boland, Garry Hogg, Barbara Pym, Vivian Stuart, Paul Scott, Nina Bawden, Carla Lane and Margaret Drabble.

== Topwrite ==
In 2005, the School obtained a grant from Awards for All to launch the TopWrite project to support young writers and help close the gaps between the commercial, literary and academic writing worlds.
