= Eugène Béjot =

French painter

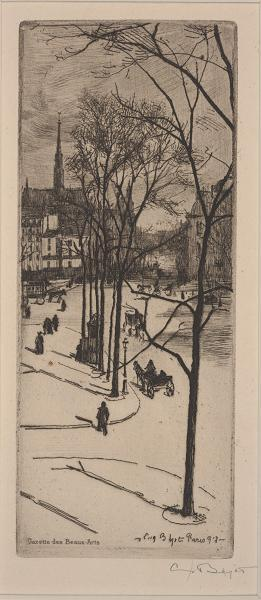
A Paris Street, 1898, Dallas Museum of Art

Eugène Béjot (French: [øʒɛn beʒo]; 31 August 1867 – 28 February 1931) was a French etcher.

== Biography ==
Béjot was born in Paris and studied there at the Académie Julian. He learnt to etch with Henri-Gabriel Ibels in 1891. Béjot's technical skills were already apparent in his 1892 first commissioned series, La Seine a Paris. He then firmly established his reputation with his widely acclaimed La Samaritaine, which was exhibited at the Peintres-Graveurs exhibition in Paris in 1893.

Béjot's work is inextricably linked to Paris. He made many etchings of the Seine, as well as of the quays and buildings of Paris. His delicate use of light evokes the city's atmosphere.

Béjot was very highly regarded in England. In 1908, he was elected to the Royal Society of Painter-Etchers and Engravers in London. He also became a Chevalier of the Legion of Honour in 1912. He died in Paris in 1931.

== Gallery ==
Selected works by Eugène Béjot
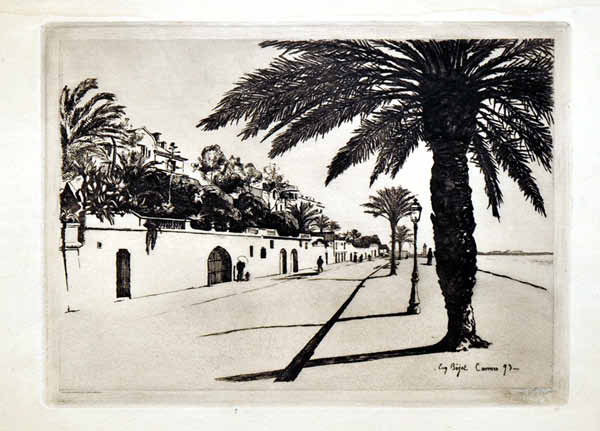
Cannes, 1893

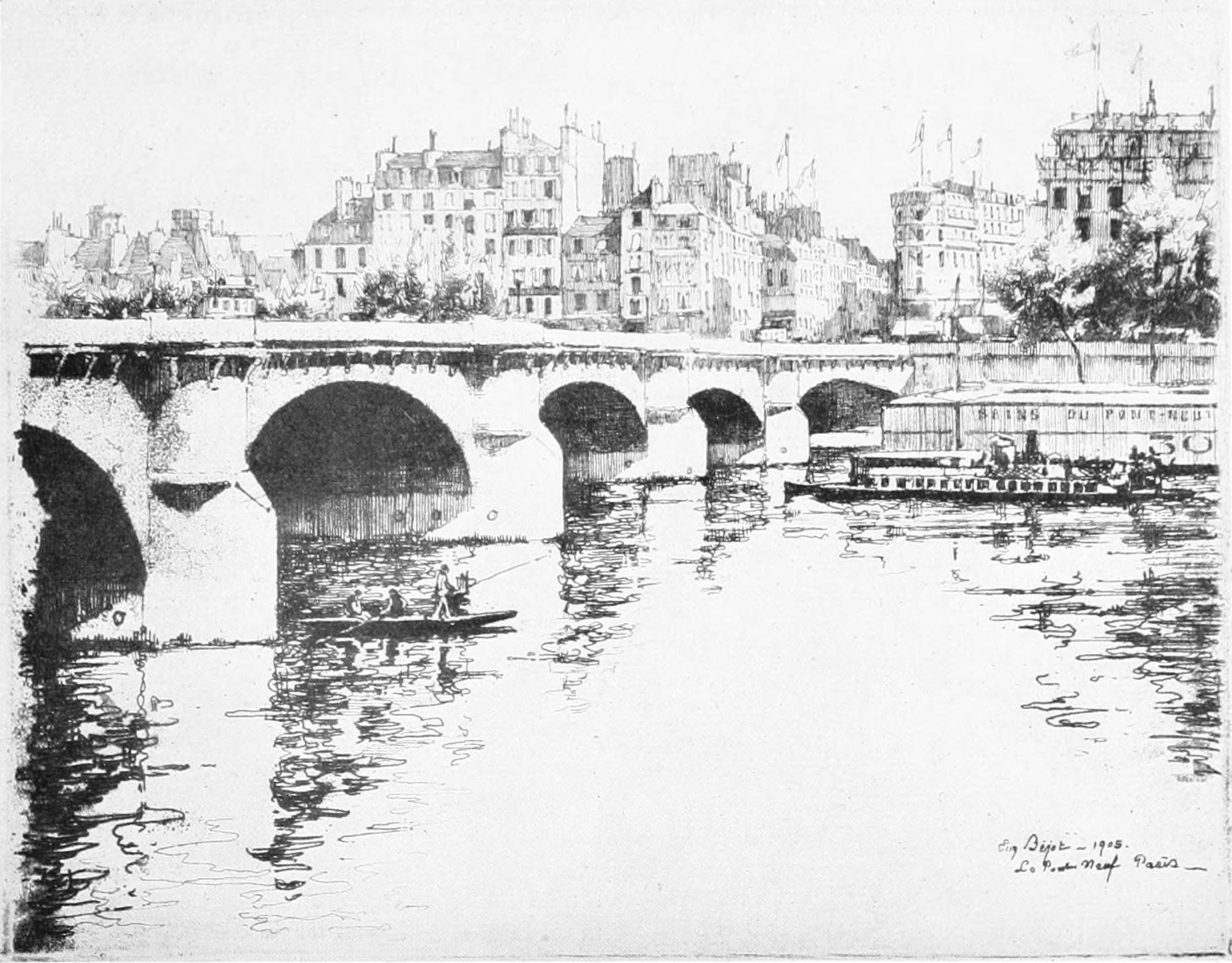
Le Pont-Neuf, 1905

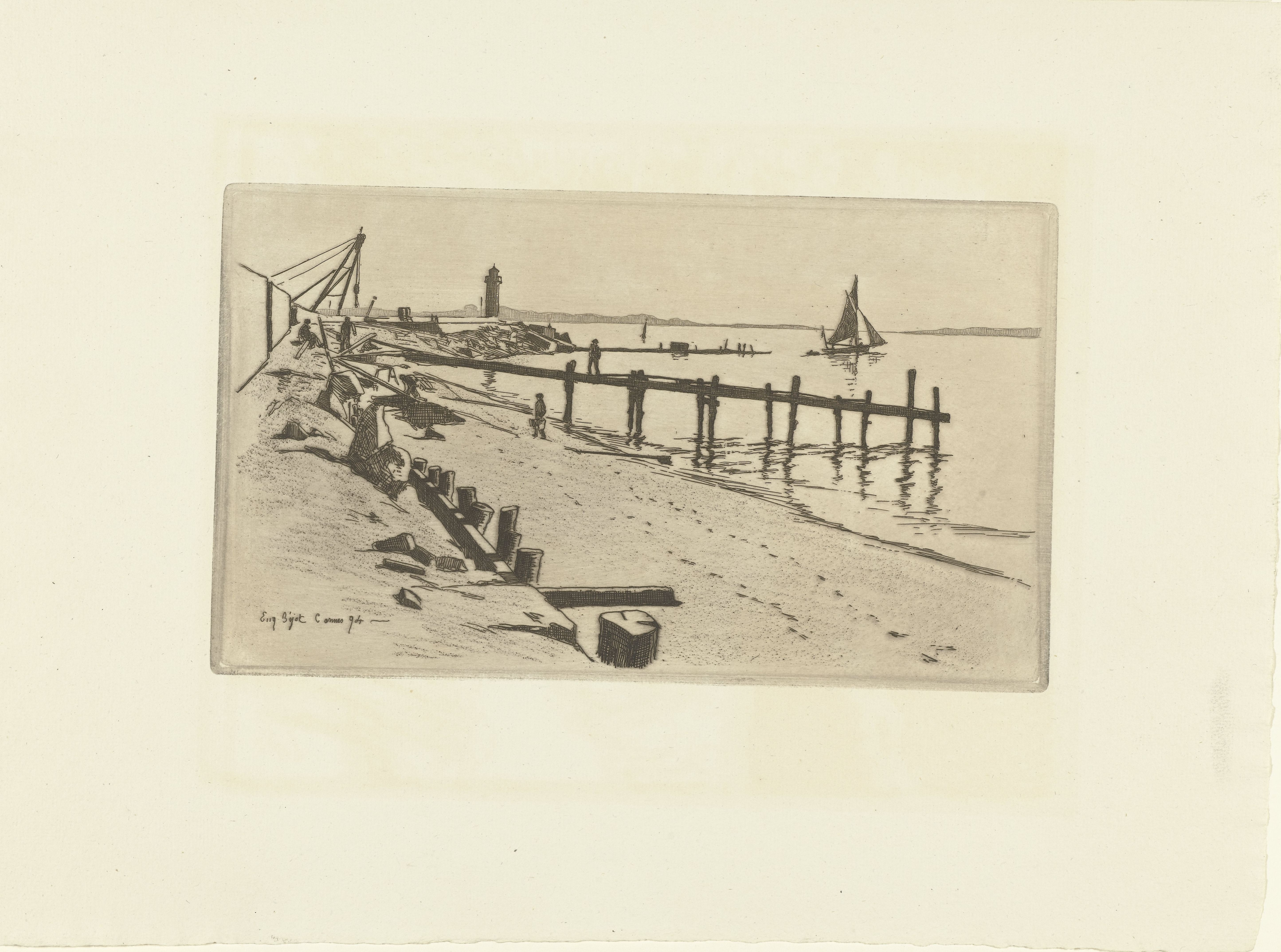
Marine à Cannes, 1894

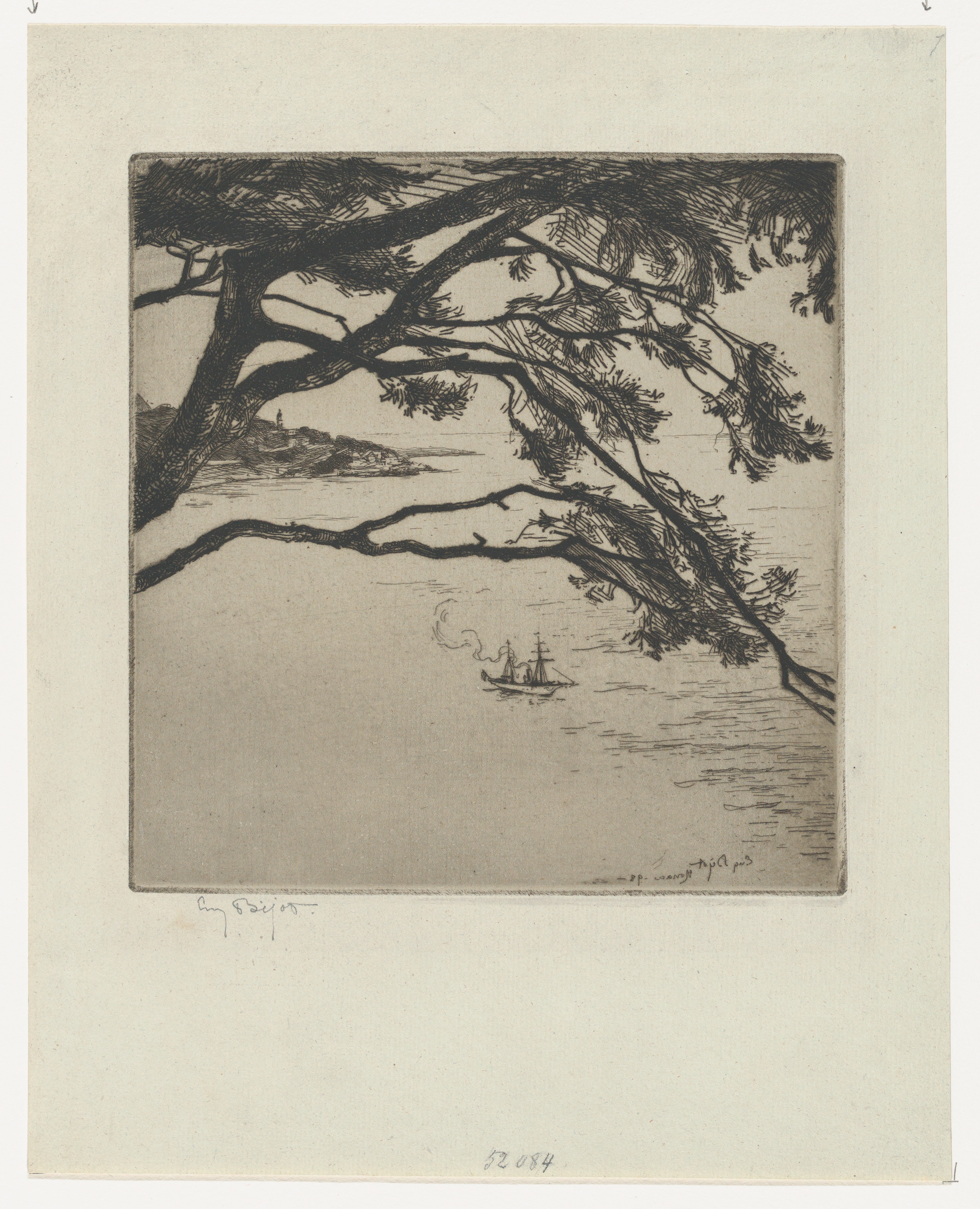
In Monaco, 1898

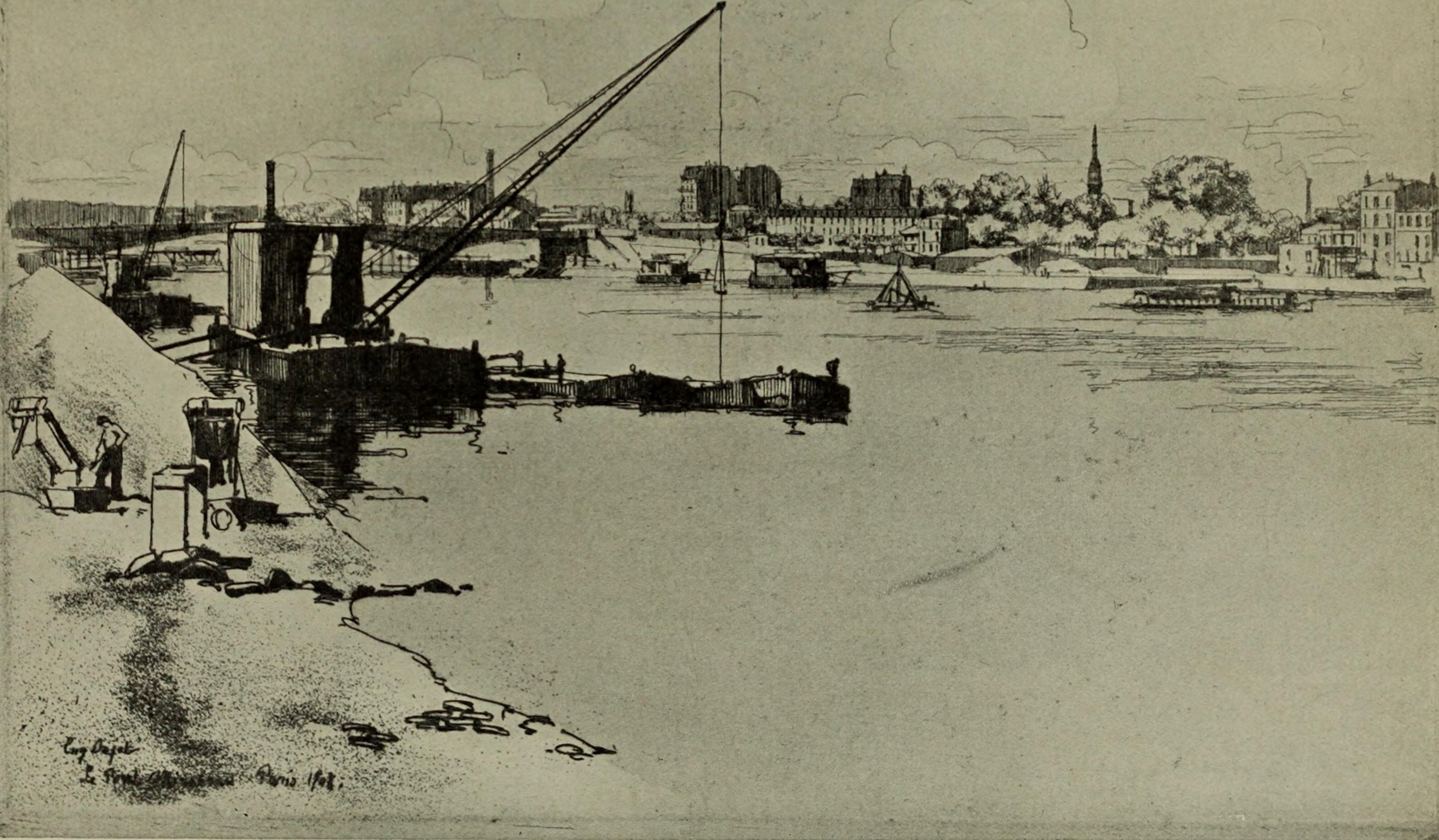
English: Le Pont Mirabeau, Paris, 1908

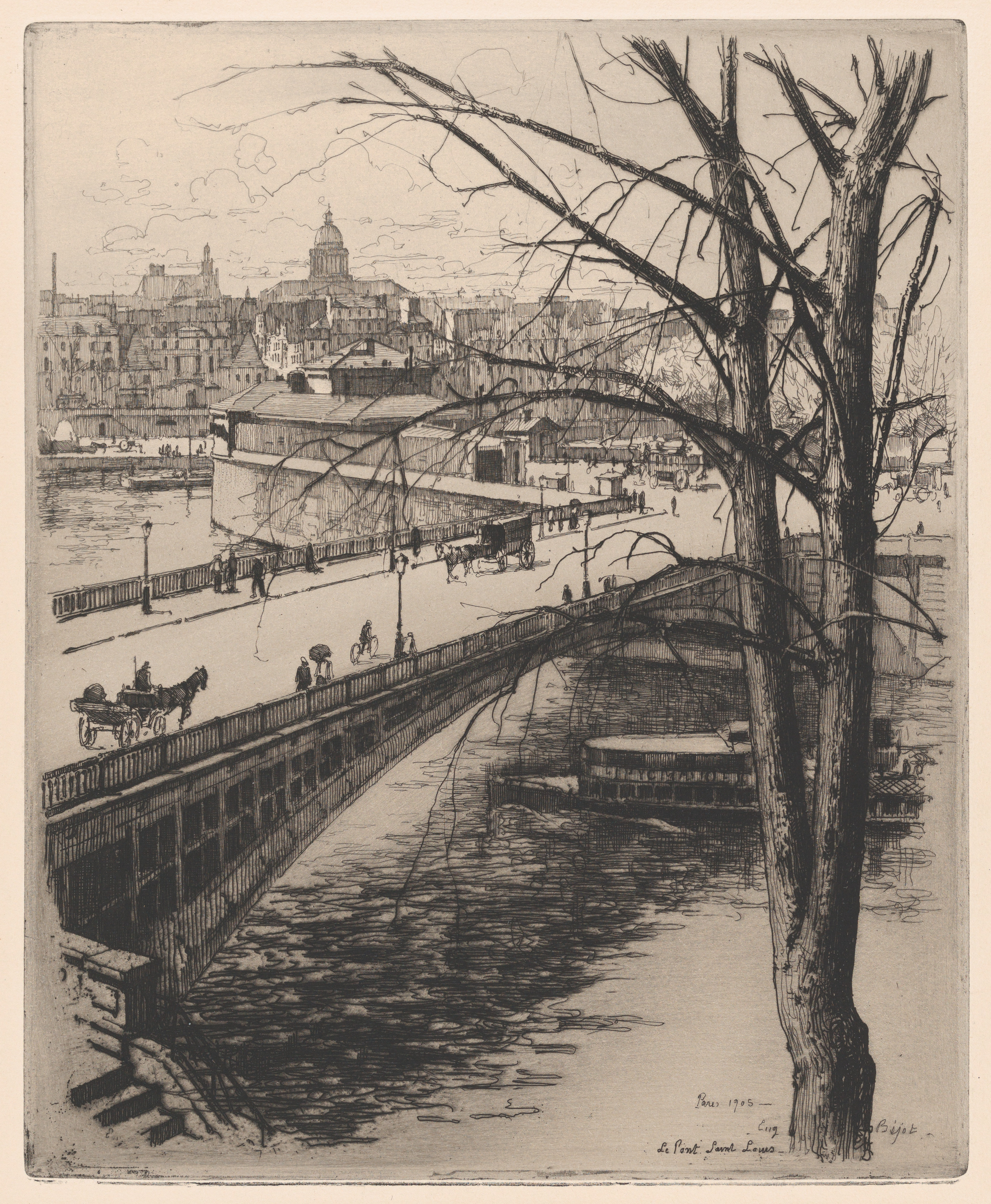
The Pont Saint-Louis, Paris, 1905
