= The Brother of Daphne =

1914 short story collection by Dornford Yates

- 1942 Ward Lock reprint
- Author: Dornford Yates
- Series: Berry books
- Genre: Short stories
- Publisher: Ward Lock & Co
- Publication date: 1914
- Media type: Print
- Pages: 304
- Followed by: The Courts of Idleness

The Brother of Daphne is a 1914 collection of comic short stories by the English author Dornford Yates (Cecil William Mercer), the first book published under the pen name he had been using for magazine pieces since 1910. This was also the first book to feature the group of characters that featured in many of his future works: Bertram ('Berry') Pleydell, his wife and cousin Daphne Pleydell, Daphne's brother Boy Pleydell, another cousin Jonathan ('Jonah') Mansel, and Jonah's younger sister Jill Mansel. The group of five – Berry, Daphne, Boy, Jonah and Jill – later came to be known collectively as 'Berry and Co'.

The short stories in the collection were originally published in The Windsor Magazine, their publication in book form having been suggested to Mercer by the Windsor's editor Arthur Hutchinson.

== Contents ==
Fifteen short stories recounting the comic adventures of Boy, Daphne, Berry, Jonah and Jill, set in Hampshire, Devon, The Cotswolds, and Austria. They are narrated in the first person by Boy.

== Background ==
Mercer was living in London and working as a barrister at the time the stories were written. He had sold short stories previously to Punch (1910), The Harmsworth Red magazine (1910) and Pearson's Magazine (1910 and 1912) before developing a working relationship with The Windsor Magazine that continued (with breaks during the war years and between 1929 and 1935) until the magazine's final issue in 1939. The Berry family characters first appear in "The Babes in the Wood" in Pearson's in September 1910, in a story that has never appeared in book form.

== Chapters ==
Chapter	Book Title	Windsor Title	Date	Volume	Issue	Pages	Illustrator
I	Punch And Judy	Punch And Judy	October 1911	XXXIV	202	541-551	H Radcliffe-Wilson
II	Clothes And The Man	There Is A Tide	August 1913	XXXVIII	224	263-271	G C Wilmshurst
III	When It Was Dark	A Drive In The Dark	November 1911	XXXIV	203	669-676	Fred Pegram
IV	Adam And New Year's Eve	Fair Exchange	January 1914	XXXIX	229	209-218	G C Wilmshurst
V	The Judgement of Paris	The Judgement of Paris	June 1914	XL	234	79-86	G C Wilmshurst
VI	Which To Adore	Which To Adore	March 1914	XXXIX	231	486-494	G C Wilmshurst
VII	Every Picture Tells A Story	Every Picture Tells A Story	July 1914	XL	235	201-208	G C Wilmshurst
VIII	The Busy Beers	Busy Bees	September 1911	XXXIV	201	391-398	A Wallis Mills
IX	A Point Of Honour	A Point Of Honour	October 1913	XXXVIII	226	501-507	G C Wilmshurst
X	Pride Goeth Before	Pride Goeth Before	April 1914	XXXIX	232	672-678	G C Wilmshurst
XI	The Love Scene	The Love Scene	September 1913	XXXVIII	225	383-391	G C Wilmshurst
XII	The Order Of The Bath	The Order Of The Bath	May 1914	XXXIX	233	685-693	G C Wilmshurst
XIII	A Lucid Interval	A Lucid Interval	November 1913	XXXVIII	227	621-627	G C Wilmshurst
XIV	A Private View	A Private View	July 1913	XXXVIII	223	141-148	G C Wilmshurst
XV	All Found	All Found	February 1914	XXXIX	230	371-378	G C Wilmshurst

== Illustrations ==
The first edition of the book, published in 1914, included plates of the illustrations by George Cecil Wilmshurst (1873-1930), originally included in The Windsor Magazine serialisations, for the stories included as chapters 2, 4, 6, 9, 10, 11, 12, 13, 14 and 15. The illustration from Chapter 15 "All Found" was also used on the dustjacket of the first edition. Wilmshurst's illustrations for chapters 5 and 7, and the illustrations by the three artists from the 1911 serialisations, were not included in the book. The book was reprinted in 1920, and that and subsequent editions did not include any illustrations.

== Dedication ==
- "To Her. Who smiles for me, though I essay no jest, Whose eyes are glad at my coming, though I bring her no gift, Who suffers me readily, though I do her no honour, My Mother."

== Critical reception ==
The book was reviewed favourably by Punch in August 1914. The reviewer called the stories "agreeable nonsense", in which the narrator "apparently could not go out for the simplest walk without meeting some amiable young woman, divinely fair and supernaturally witty, with whom he presently exchanged airy badinage".

== Dramatisation ==
An episode of the ITV Hannay series, "A Point of Honour", was based on the eponymous story published as Chapter IX of The Brother of Daphne, but the source was uncredited.

== Bibliography ==
- Smithers, AJ (1982). Dornford Yates. London: Hodder and Stoughton. ISBN 0-340-27547-2.
- Usborne, Richard (1974). Clubland Heroes. London: Barrie & Jenkins. ISBN 0-214-20012-4.
