= Southgate School =

Location
- Sussex Way; Oakwood, Greater London, EN4 0BL; England; 51°38′49″N 0°08′27″W

Information
- Type: Academy
- Established: 1907
- Local authority: Enfield
- Trust: Middlesex Learning Trust
- Department for Education URN: 142727 Tables
- Ofsted: Reports
- Headteacher: Samson Olusanya
- Gender: Coeducational
- Age: 11 to 18
- Enrolment: 1492
- Former name: Southgate County Grammar School
- Website: http://www.southgate.enfield.sch.uk/

Southgate School is a coeducational secondary school and sixth form located in the Oakwood area of London, England.

The school is situated just east of the Cat Hill roundabout of the A111 and A110, between Cockfosters and Oakwood tube stations. Although once historically in Southgate, the school is now in the parish of St Thomas, Oakwood, on the boundary with Cockfosters to the west, and on the western edge of Enfield borough, 500 metres east of the Barnet boundary.

== History ==
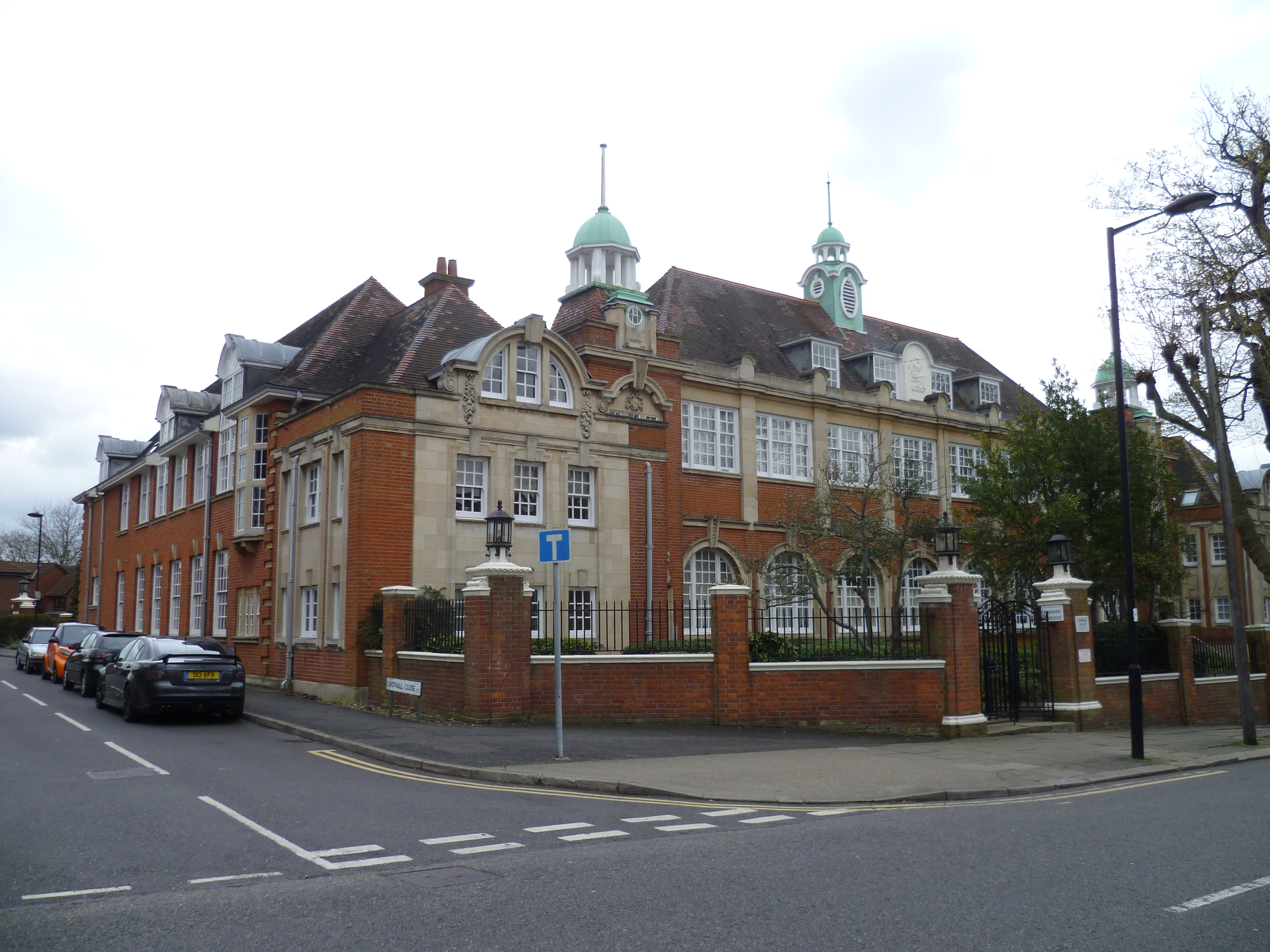
The former premises of Southgate County School in Fox Lane, Palmers Green, now Corrib Court flats.

=== Grammar school ===
Founded in 1907 as Southgate County School, the school was originally housed within Broomfield House, Palmers Green. The school subsequently moved to Fox Lane (also in Palmers Green). In 1960, the Fox Lane site was closed and a new site, in Sussex Way, Cockfosters, was purchased.

=== Comprehensive ===
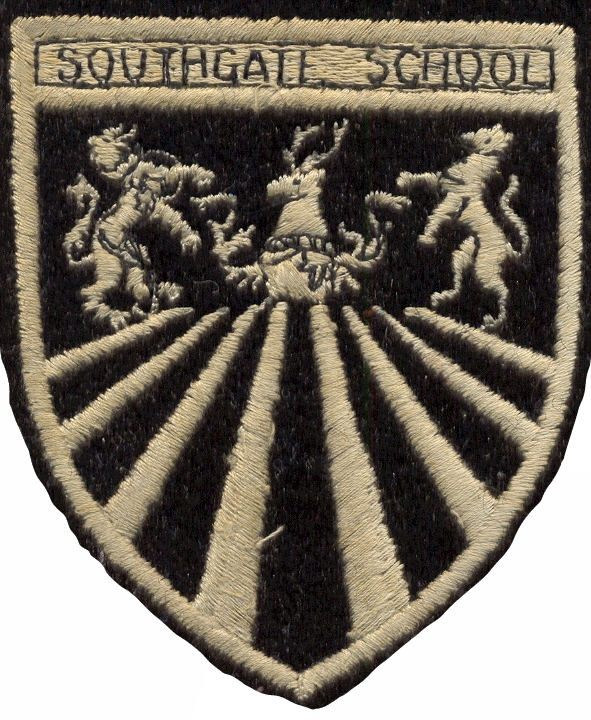
School uniform badge circa 1970

Oakwood School opened on Chase Road on 24th April 1933. In 1967, Southgate School merged with Oakwood Secondary Modern School. The Chase Road site became the lower school, for children in their first three years of secondary education (currently referred to as years 7, 8, and 9).

=== The 1990s ===
In 1991, the Lower School also moved to the Sussex Way site, with the Chase Road site being sold partly for housing and partly to a primary school.

=== The 2000s ===
In September 2004, the school was awarded Specialist Science Status, which it gained through raising £50,000 and being provided with the necessary funding for a science specialist school. It used the funding to generally improve science facilities purchasing new equipment and renewing laboratories as well as building a hanging laboratory in the middle of the East Wing building (the original Upper School building).

In the Summer of 2007, Southgate celebrated its centenary.

=== The 2010s ===
In 2015, after 15 years as headteacher, Anthony Wilde left Southgate School and was replaced by Martin Lavelle. Lavelle appeared on BBC2 expressing his concern and doubts over the marking of exams.

In April 2016, Southgate School converted from a community school (administered by Enfield London Borough Council) to academy status. The school is now sponsored by the Middlesex Learning Trust.

== Ofsted Report ==
On 11 February 2009, Southgate was awarded Outstanding Status, one of only two in the London Borough of Enfield.

On 16 October 2019, Southgate School was awarded Good Status.

On 1 April 2025, Southgate School was again inspected. This inspection was not graded, but the report found that "the school’s work may have improved significantly across all areas since the previous inspection".

== Notable former pupils ==
- Marcus Edwards, footballer for Burnley
- Roy Chipolina, Captain of Gibraltar national football team
- Kurt Barling, Journalist, Film-maker, author, academic. Professor of Journalism, Middlesex University, Award-winning BBC Special Correspondent BBC London News
- Matt Di Angelo, actor and singer best known for his role as Dean Wicks in the BBC soap opera, Eastenders.
- Jake Hook, songwriter and producer, 1991 - 1998
- Jay1, Rapper, 2008 - 2015
- Christy Lefteri, author
- Victoria Shalet, actor, 1993-2000
- Phil Tufnell, cricketer
- Stephen Twigg, Member of Parliament for Liverpool West Derby

=== Southgate County Grammar School ===
- Peter Baker (born 1931), Tottenham Hotspur footballer
- Sir John Bourn, Comptroller and Auditor General 1998–2008
- Alexander Dalgarno, Phillips Professor of Astronomy at Harvard University since 1977
- Alan Dumayne (1929-1998), historian of north London.
- Leofranc Holford-Strevens (born 1946), classical scholar
- Cecil Hunt, journalist, editor, novelist and anthologist
- Lena Jeger, Baroness Jeger, Labour member of parliament for Holborn and St Pancras South
- George Mitchell, musician
- Warren Mitchell, actor known for playing Alf Garnett
- Ron Moody, film actor, who played the part of Fagin in the British musical Oliver!
- L. J. K. Setright, motoring journalist
