= Garry Hogg =

English writer (1902–1976)

Garry Hogg (1902–1976) was an English writer, journalist, reviewer, broadcaster and lecturer.

== Education ==
He studied English Language and Literature at Wadham College, University of Oxford, and went on to become a schoolmaster. He was an officer of the National Book League from 1945 to 1948. He is remembered fondly in the memoirs of children's author and historian, Geoffrey Trease.

== Bibliography ==
- In the Nick of Time (1958)
- The Granite Men (1954)
- Dutch Treat.
- Swiss Spring.
- Portuguese Journey.
- Norwegian Journey.
- Cannibalism and Human Sacrifice.
- Bavarian Journey first published by Robert Hale (London) in 1958.
- ...And Far Away [Offa's Dyke to beyond Hadrian's Wall, via the Cotswolds, etc.] Travel Book Club edition, 1948.
- The Road Before Me Phoenix House, 1948.
- Explorers Awheel (Explorers series) – London, Thomas Nelson 1938.
- Explorers On the Wall (Explorers series) (about Hadrian's Wall) – London, Thomas Nelson 1939.
- Explorers Afloat (Explorers series) – London, Thomas Nelson 1940.
- The Overlanders – Robert Hale, London (1961)
- Orient Express – Walker and Company (1969)
- "A Guide To English Country Houses" – Arco Publishing Company Inc. 1969.
- "The Batsford Colour Book of London" – B.T. Batsford Ltd. 1971.
- "English Inns and Villages" – Arco Publishing Company Inc. 1972.
- "Turf Beneath My Feet" – Museum Press Limited 1950.
- "The Batsford Colour Book of the Cotswolds" – B.T. Batsford Ltd. 1973.

== Hobbies and pastimes ==
He used his own photographs to illustrate his own travel books, and his other pastimes included joinery. He studied country crafts and travelled whenever possible. He sometimes wrote in collaboration with his wife Elizabeth Grey, and they lived on the Kent and Sussex border in the United Kingdom.

Garry Hogg became the second Chairman of Swanwick writers' summer school in 1952
