= Edmund Blampied =

British painter

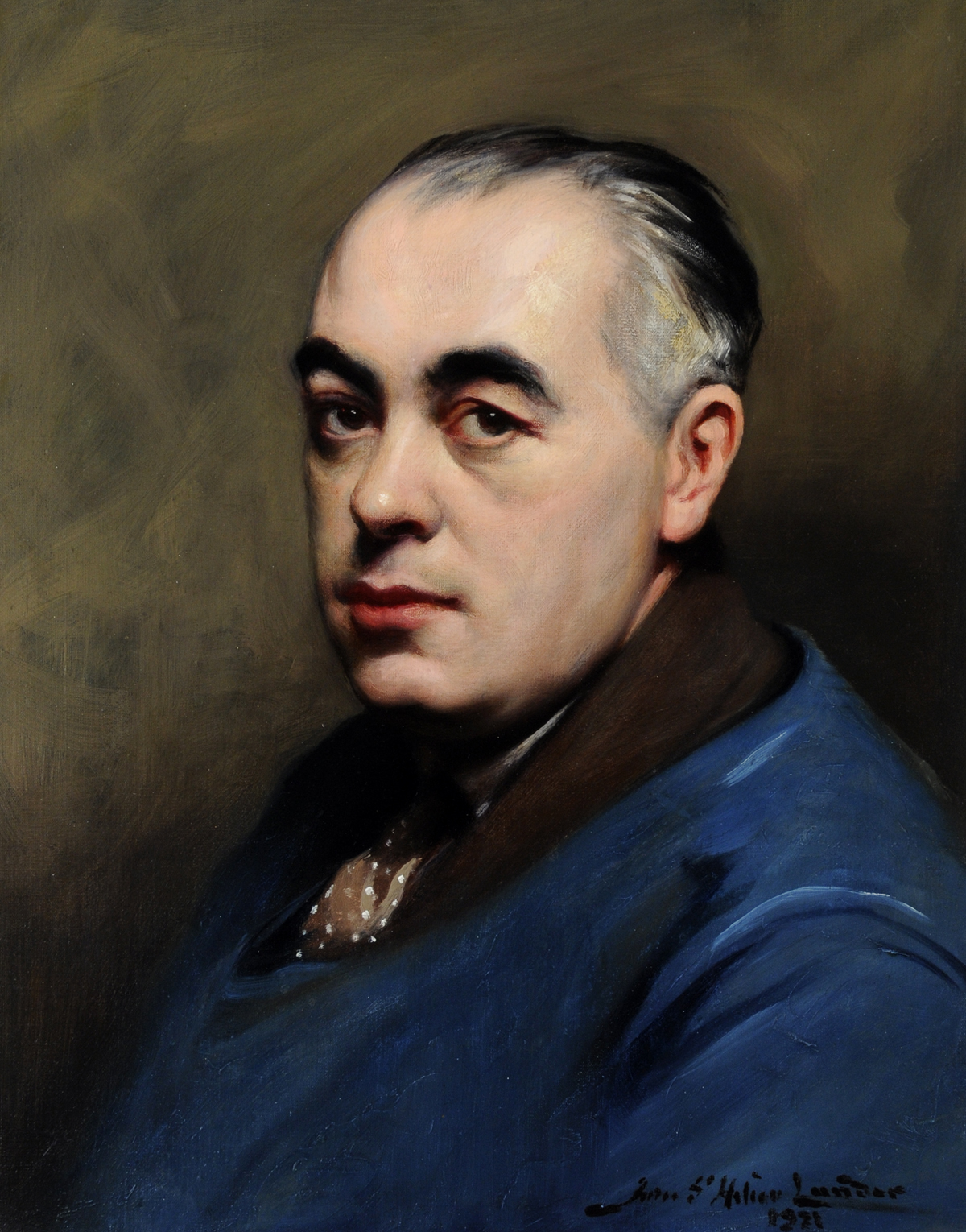
- A portrait of the artist by his friend, John St Helier Lander
- Born: 30 March 1886; Saint Martin, Jersey
- Died: 26 August 1966 (aged 80); Saint Aubin, Jersey
- Education: Trinity Parish School, Jersey; Lambeth School of Art, London; London County Council School of Photoengraving and Lithography; Saint Martin's School of Art, London.
- Occupations: Artist and etcher
- Spouse: Marianne van Abbé

Edmund Blampied (30 March 1886 – 26 August 1966) was one of the most eminent artists to come from the Channel Islands, yet he received no formal training in art until he was 15 years old. He was noted mostly for his etchings and drypoints published at the height of the print boom in the 1920s during the etching revival, but was also a lithographer, caricaturist, cartoonist, book illustrator and artist in oils, watercolours, silhouettes and bronze.

== Early years ==
Edmund Blampied (in Jèrriais Edmond Bliampid) was born on a farm in the Parish of Saint Martin, Jersey in the Channel Islands on 30 March 1886, five days after the death of his father, John Blampied. He was the last of four boys and was brought up by his mother, Elizabeth, a dressmaker and shopkeeper mostly in the Parish of Trinity, Jersey. His first language was Jèrriais. He finished parochial school at the age of 14 and went to work in the office of the town architect in Saint Helier, the capital of the island. Some of his pen and ink sketches of an agricultural show in 1901 were noticed by Mlle Marie Josephine Klintz, a woman who ran a local private art school. She gave the young Blampied his first formal lessons in art and introduced him to watercolours. His caricatures of politicians such as the Constable of St. Helier, Philippe Baudains, during a local election brought Blampied to the attention of a businessman named Saumerez James Nicolle who offered to sponsor him at art school in London, provided he tried to get a scholarship.

== Art school ==
In January 1903, aged 16 years old and barely able to speak English, Blampied left Jersey to study at the Lambeth School of Art, where he was taught by Philip Connard R.A. and Thomas McKeggie. After taking a test and submitting some drawings, in May 1904 Blampied won a £20 London County Council (LCC) Scholarship for two years to continue his studies at any LCC art school. Later that year he was selected by the head of the Art School to work part-time on the staff of a national newspaper, The Daily Chronicle, which enabled him to earn some extra money. His first published illustrations appeared in The Daily Chronicle on 13 January 1905.

In September 1905 Blampied transferred from the Lambeth School of Art to the London County Council School of Photo-engraving and Lithography at Bolt Court for the final year of his scholarship. There he became friends with the artists and illustrators Salomon van Abbe, John Nicolson and Robert Charles Peter. It is believed that, after finishing full-time studies at Bolt Court in the summer of 1906, he continued to work at The Daily Chronicle and then perhaps at other newspapers while studying in the evenings at Bolt Court, though very little is known about this period in his life.

== Etching ==
Blampied’s earliest etchings are dated December 1909, suggesting that he did not begin to learn this technique until the academic year 1909–1910; his teacher at Bolt Court was Walter Seymour. Blampied’s prints were first shown at an exhibition of students' work in March 1914, where his etching of an ox cart was noted by the correspondent of The Times. The first print believed to have been published was an etching entitled At the wings (illustration removed) which was reproduced in the Annual Report of Bolt Court in 1914. Blampied later recorded his method of working on zinc for etching and copper for drypoint in Ernest Stephen Lumsden's treatise The Art of Etching, published in 1925. Blampied wrote: "I generally chose from amongst my various drawings one which would tend to produce a successful plate. I do not trace on to the copper, but copy a few important lines on to the bare metal with litho-chalk. I then sketch over this with an ordinary sewing needle and rub in a little black oil-colour. . . From the first my efforts are to improve on the sketch until I consider the plate finished. . . In very few cases do I touch a plate after the first proof, so the majority have but one state. If I am dissatisfied with either the composition or details, I prefer to start afresh upon another plate rather than make radical alterations."

== Independent artist ==
At the end of 1911, while he was developing his skills as an etcher, Blampied decided to try his luck as an independent artist with his own studio. The rapid developments in colour printing and the advertisers of the time were creating a great deal of work for commercial artists for book and magazine publishers in London. The first recorded illustration was for a piece of sheet music entitled Glamour Valse, published in 1911 by Ascherberg, Hopwood and Crew. Blampied quickly gained commissions to provide drawings for Pearson's Magazine, The Sketch, The Sphere, The Ladies Field, The Queen and The Graphic, many of which were signed "Blam", a diminutive first recorded in The Tatler in January 1916. He used this diminutive for much of his commercial work for books and magazines, including three children's books for the Edinburgh publisher Thomas Nelson and Sons, Blam's Book of Fun, The Jolly ABC, and The Breezy Farm ABC, all published in 1921, and for much of his work for Pearson's Magazine, Hutchinson's Magazine, The Bystander, and The Sketch between 1916 and 1939.

Blampied’s etchings were brought to the attention of the art dealers and publishers Ernest Brown and Phillips of the Leicester Galleries in London through an introduction from H. Granville Fell, an artist and art editor. The Leicester Galleries offered Blampied a contract and three prints were shown to the general public in February 1915 in the first of a series of exhibitions of prints called Modern Masters of Etching. Blampied's most famous print, called Driving home in the rain, which had been designed in 1913 and transferred to a zinc plate in 1914, was not shown at the Leicester Galleries until November 1916 where, according to a Jersey newspaper of that time, it received a great deal of attention and admiration.

On 5 August 1914, Edmund Blampied married Marianne van Abbe (b Amsterdam 27 August 1887, d Jersey 11 May 1986) who was the sister of Dutch-born artists Joseph and Salomon van Abbe. They had no children. Marianne had acted as his agent for several years before they married, and continued to do so until Edmund's brother John began working as an artist's agent in the 1920s. She was a great support to Blampied in his work and prompted him to travel and see the world.

== Military service ==
When conscription was introduced in Britain in 1916, Blampied returned to Jersey in the autumn of that year to be prepared to be called up for military service. In June 1917 he was classified as not fully fit for active service and was put on guard duties in the Royal Jersey Militia. Although there was a gap in commissions for illustrations while he settled into military life, by early 1918 he had re-established his connections with the Scottish book publishers Thomas Nelson and Sons of Edinburgh, for whom he illustrated many children’s books and annuals during and immediately after the war.

Blampied quickly re-established himself in London in September 1919 after his return from Jersey and his etchings were acknowledged by the Royal Society of Painter-Etchers and Engravers who elected him an Associate in March 1920 at the same time as the wood engraver Gwen Raverat. He was elevated to the full fellowship a year later. Blampied was elected at the end of what has been called the "etching revival", but there was still a strong market for prints, mainly as an inexpensive investment in art.

In October 1920 Blampied held his first solo exhibition of 28 etchings and drypoints at the Leicester Galleries, many of which were prints that had been held back because of the war. Driving home in the rain was shown but the copy had been lent, suggesting that all proofs had been sold. His first exhibition of drawings and etchings in the US was held at Kennedy and Company in New York in early 1922.

== Gold medal at 1925 Paris exposition ==
Blampied had started to experiment with lithography in 1920, as two lithographs were shown at his first solo exhibition, but they had been transferred to a lithographers' stone from paper, and he wanted to learn how to draw directly onto the stone. Blampied turned to Archibald Hartrick, a founder member of the Senefelder Club of lithographers, who was teaching at the Central School of Arts and Crafts, and started evening classes there. His early efforts, as with etching, proved to be very successful, especially a print named Splash, splash which caught the eye of the art critic Malcolm Salaman. Salaman included it in 1923 in the first of a long-running series of annual volumes called Fine Prints of the Year, which included examples of Blampied’s work each year between 1923 and 1937.

In 1925 the Central School of Arts and Crafts submitted two of Blampied’s lithographs with the work of other students to the Exposition Internationale des Arts Décoratifs et Industriels Modernes in Paris, the exhibition that gave rise to the term “Art Deco”. The School won a Grand Prix for its works on paper and Blampied was one of 12 students who were awarded a Gold Medal as a collaborateur.

In 1924, having been inspired by an exhibition at the Leicester Galleries of models in wax by Degas, Blampied produced his only bronzes: Kicking horse, in an edition of 15, and Homewards evening (edition unknown). Blampied held another major exhibition of his work, also at the Leicester Galleries, in March 1925 where he showed eight etchings, 25 paintings and 18 drawings, but his bronzes do not seem to have been shown at an exhibition until 1929.

"An officer and a gentleman", an illustration from The Bystander in 1926

== Illustrations for books and magazines ==
While developing his skills as an etcher and lithographer in the early 1920s Blampied continued to work extensively for magazines and contributed hundreds of political cartoons and decorative drawings to The Bystander magazine between 1922 and 1926; he illustrated short stories by E. F. Benson and other authors in Hutchinson’s Magazine, and continued to design book jackets for publishers including Hodder & Stoughton, Herbert Jenkins, T. Fisher Unwin, Eveleigh Nash, William Collins and Constable. The books for T. Fisher Unwin included dust jackets for new impressions in 1923 of eleven of E. Nesbit's famous children’s novels and James Hilton's rare second novel called Storm Passage. Blampied also illustrated a film edition of Black Beauty by Anna Sewell and a new edition of The Roadmender by Michael Fairless.

Blampied held his first exhibition of paintings and drawings, rather than prints, at the Leicester Galleries in February 1923 while continuing regularly to exhibit his prints at the annual shows of the Royal Society of Painter Etchers and Engravers and the Senefelder Club of British lithographers, named after Alois Senefelder, the inventor of the method. Blampied was a member of the Council of both societies for periods between 1924 and 1938.

== Travel in Tunisia ==
At the end of 1926 Blampied gave up his work for books and magazines, sold his house and studio in south London, and travelled in southern France and north Africa for about 5 months. Some of his drawings from this period were bought by Martin Hardie for the Victoria and Albert Museum and for Eton College, a private school. For the next three years after his return to London in April 1927, Blampied designed many prints, mostly using drypoint, dabbled in abstract art during an illness to produce what he called his "Colour symphonies", and produced watercolours and oils for a major exhibition held in May 1929 at the galleries of Alex. Reid and Lefevre.

== Blampied as humorist ==
The artist in 1938

When the market for etchings collapsed during the great depression in the early 1930s, Blampied reinvented himself as a cartoonist and caricaturist at an exhibition in 1931 called "Blampied’s Nonsense Show". This brought out his love of the absurd and led to his only book, obscurely entitled Bottled Trout and Polo. In this period Blampied also published more than 30 humorous lithographs, many of dogs, that are not recorded in either of the catalogues raisonné (see Bibliography).

After illustrating a new edition of Travels with a Donkey in the Cévennes by Robert Louis Stevenson, Blampied returned to work for magazines in 1933 with a weekly series of illustrations of British life in ink and sepia wash for The Illustrated London News. Blampied’s few published portraits are known from this time, although he did not particularly enjoy doing them. From photographs he drew small pencil portraits of authors and actors for a magazine called The Queen and an oil of Queen Mary (Mary of Teck) for the Christmas issue in 1934; he collaborated with his great friend and benefactor John St Helier Lander, a noted portrait artist and fellow-Jerseyman, on a picture of King George V; and he did an etching of the Jersey-born politician, Lord Portsea (Bertram Falle), which was shown at the Royal Academy in 1934. After finishing his work for the Illustrated London News in 1935 he continue to work for magazines until 1939, mainly doing occasional cartoons for The Sketch, often featuring two tramps called Horace and George.

== Peter and Wendy ==
In May 1938 Blampied was elected to the Royal Society of British Artists. Later that year he was asked to prepare some new illustrations for a lavish edition of Peter Pan, the rights to which had been bequeathed by J. M. Barrie to Great Ormond Street Hospital for Children. The Blampied Edition of Peter and Wendy was published in 1939 by Hodder & Stoughton in the UK and by Scribners in the US, and is one of the finest illustrated editions of this book.

== German occupation of Jersey ==
By the time Peter and Wendy was published Blampied had moved from London to Jersey with the intention of settling there. Even though by June 1940 it was clear that the Channel Islands would not be defended from the Germans, Blampied and his Jewish wife had decided to remain on the island. Jersey was occupied on 1 July 1940 and Blampied was trapped there for almost five years by the German Occupation of the island until its liberation on 9 May 1945. During this period he was unable to remain in contact with publishers and art dealers, and had great trouble obtaining artists' materials. But there were two notable commissions.

The lack of currency in Jersey led to a request to design bank notes for the States of Jersey in denominations of 6 pence, 1 shilling, 2 shillings, 10 shillings and 1 pound, which were issued in April 1942. The 6d note was designed by Blampied in such a way that the word six on the reverse incorporated an outsized "X" so that when the note was folded, the result was the resistance symbol "V" for victory. A year later he was asked to design six new postage stamps for the island of ½ d to 3 d, and as a sign of resistance he cleverly incorporated the initials GR in the three penny stamp to display loyalty to King George VI. The only exhibition of his work during the war years was held at the Cleveland Museum of Art from February 1941 which showed 187 works mostly from the collection of Harold J Baily, an American lawyer who had been a notable patron of Blampied since 1927. The etching A Jersey vraic cart, which Blampied had just managed to have printed and signed before the island was invaded, was issued by the Print Club of Cleveland to coincide with the exhibition.

== Post-war years ==
Blampied did not return to London after the war but remained in Jersey, mostly working in oils and watercolours, except for a series of 12 silhouettes he published in 1950 and a few etchings in 1957 and 1958, one for the Print Collector's Club of the Royal Society of Painter-Etchers and Engravers which was shown at the Royal Academy. In 1948 he designed a postage stamp to celebrate the third anniversary of the liberation of Jersey, and he designed the first Jersey regional stamp, issued in 1964.

Blampied held three major exhibitions of his work in Jersey, in 1946, 1951, and 1960 and continued to sell his watercolours and oil paintings in the UK and US, mostly at the annual exhibitions of the Royal Society of British Artists and through the dealers Annans in Glasgow and Guy Mayer in New York. A large exhibition of his work was held at the John Nelson Bergstrom Art Center and Museum, Neenah, Wisconsin in July 1954. His last exhibition was held at the Barreau Art Gallery of Jersey Museum in October 1964.

Blampied died in Jersey on 26 August 1966, aged 80 years. His ashes were scattered in St Aubin's Bay, Jersey.

== Body of work ==
Blampied was a prolific illustrator and over 600 issues of magazines and newspapers have been recorded containing his work between 1905 and 1939. His illustrations appear in around 50 books, and he designed the dust jacket for some 150 other books, mostly novels. He also designed menu cards, loyal addresses, sheet music, Christmas cards, commercial advertising material and bookplates.

During his career Edmund Blampied produced some 200 etchings and drypoints, and more than 80 lithographs and lithographic prints, many of which depicted rural life in his beloved island of Jersey. His scenes of collecting seaweed, called vraic, from the beaches of the island using a horse and cart were, he said, his signature tune.

Besides his work in the visual arts, he also amused himself and his friends by writing poetry in Jèrriais, signing himself as Un Tout-à-travèrs. In 1933, La Chronique de Jersey, a French language newspaper, considered publishing a booklet of Blampied poems illustrated by the artist himself, but the plans came to nothing. In 1938 two of his poems were set pieces at the Jersey Eisteddfod. In 1944 he wrote words for an insulting anti-Hitler song entitled La chanson Hitleur and provided illustrations for two poems written by Winter Le Brocq.

Blampied’s prints, drawings and pictures are in the collections of: Jersey Heritage, Jersey, Channel Islands; Ashmolean Museum, Oxford; British Council, London; British Museum, London; Courtauld Gallery, London; Fitzwilliam Museum, Cambridge, UK; Leeds Art Gallery, UK; Victoria and Albert Museum, London; Walker Art Gallery, Liverpool, UK; McLean Museum and Art Gallery, Greenock, Scotland; Scottish National Gallery of Modern Art, Edinburgh, Scotland; Boston Museum of Fine Arts, Massachusetts, USA; Boston Public Library, Massachusetts, USA; Bowdoin College Museum of Art, Brunswick, Maine, USA; Brooklyn Museum, New York, USA; Cincinnati Art Museum, Ohio, USA; Cleveland Museum of Art, Ohio, USA; Dallas Museum of Art, Texas, USA; Delaware Art Museum, Wilmington, Delaware, USA; Detroit Institute of Arts, USA; Fine Arts Museum of San Francisco, California, USA; Heckscher Museum of Art, New York, USA; Herbert F. Johnson Museum of Art at Cornell University, New York, USA; Indianapolis Museum of Art, Indiana, US; Lehigh University Art Gallery, Bethlehem, Pennsylvania, USA; Mead Art Museum, Amherst, Massachusetts, USA; Metropolitan Museum of Art, New York, USA; Nelson-Atkins Museum of Art, Kansas City, Missouri, USA; Saint Louis Art Museum, Missouri, USA; Saint Joseph College (Connecticut) Art Gallery, USA; Santa Barbara Museum of Art, California, USA; Yale Center for British Art, New Haven, Connecticut, USA; Art Gallery of South Australia, Adelaide, Australia; the Museum of New Zealand, Wellington, New Zealand; the Rijksmuseum, Amsterdam, Netherlands; Israel Museum, Jerusalem; and in the collections of several other British and American museums and American universities.

Illustrations and photograph reproduced by kind permission of the Estate of Edmund Blampied.

== Notable books illustrated by Edmund Blampied ==
All published in the UK unless otherwise noted.

- 1912 Me as a Model by W. R. Titterton: Frank and Cecil Palmer and Mitchell Kennerley, US
- 1914 The Money Moon by Jeffery Farnol: Sampson Low, Marston.
- 1915 The Chronicles of the Imp by Jeffery Farnol: Sampson Low, Marston.
- 1919 Two little scamps and a puppy by Angela Brazil: Thomas Nelson and Sons.
- 1919 Terry and Starshine by Amy Whipple: Thomas Nelson and Sons.
- 1920 John’s visit to the Farm by Evelyn Sharp: Thomas Nelson and Sons.
- 1920 At the Farm by Evelyn Hardy: Thomas Nelson and Sons.
- 1921 The Jolly ABC by Blam: Thomas Nelson and Sons.
- 1921 The Breezy Farm ABC by Blam: Thomas Nelson and Sons.
- 1921 Blam’s Book of Fun: Thomas Nelson and Sons.
- 1922 Black Beauty by Anna Sewell: Jarrolds.
- 1923 Untamed. The Horses of the Wild by David Grew: T. Fisher Unwin (3rd imp).
- 1923 Trapping Wild Animals in Malay Jungles, by Charles Mayer: T. Fisher Unwin (4th imp).
- 1924 The Zoo Book: Thomas Nelson and Sons.
- 1924 The Roadmender by Michael Fairless: Duckworth and Co.
- 1931 Travels with a Donkey in the Cévennes by Robert Louis Stevenson: John Lane, The Bodley Head, UK and Dodd, Mead and Company, US.
- 1934 Albert goes through by J. B. Priestley: William Heinemann.
- 1936 Bottled Trout and Polo, by Blampied: George Newnes.
- 1937 Hand-picked Howlers by Cecil Hunt: Methuen.
- 1937 Cours de Francais I. En route by E. Saxelby: Ginn and Co.
- 1938 More Hand-picked Howlers by Cecil Hunt: Methuen.
- 1938 Cours de Francais II. En march by E. Saxelby: Ginn and Co.
- 1939 Ripe Howlers by Cecil Hunt: Methuen.
- 1939 Cours de Francais III. En France by E. Saxelby: Ginn and Co.
- 1939 The Blampied edition of Peter and Wendy by J.M. Barrie: Hodder & Stoughton.
- 1940 Hand-Picked Proverbs by Cecil Hunt: Methuen.
- 1945 Jersey in Jail 1940 - 45 by Horace Wyatt. Jersey: Ernest Huelin.

== Selected bibliography ==
- Campbell Dodgson (1926). A Complete Catalogue of the Etchings and Drypoints of Edmund Blampied. London: Halton and Truscott Smith.
- Malcolm Salaman (1926). Modern Masters of Etching No. 10 Edmund Blampied. London: The Studio.
- E.L. Allhusen (1926) The etchings of Edmund Blampied. Print Collector’s Quarterly 13 (1): 69 - 96.
- Malcolm Salaman (1932). The lithographs of Edmund Blampied. Print Collector’s Quarterly 19 (4): 298 -319.
- Harold J. Baily (1937). Blampied: artist and philosopher. Print Collector’s Quarterly 24 (4): 363 - 393.
- Marguerite Syvret (1986). Edmund Blampied. London: Robin Garton.
- Jean Arnold & John Appleby (1996). A Catalogue Raisonné of Etchings, Drypoints and Lithographs of Edmund Blampied. Jersey: JAB Publishing.
- Andrew Hall (2010). Edmund Blampied. An Illustrated Life. Jersey: Jersey Heritage Trust. ISBN 978-0-9562079-2-0
