= Anita Klein =

Australian/British artist (born 1960)

Anita Klein (born 14 February 1960 in Sydney) is an Australian/ British painter and printmaker.

== Biography ==
Anita Klein studied at Chelsea School of Art and the Slade School of Art in London. From 2003 - 2006 she was president of the Royal Society of Painter Printmakers (PRE). She has work in many private and public collections in Europe, the USA and Australia, including the Arts Council of Great Britain, the British Museum and the British Library. She has had many solo exhibitions in the London as well as worldwide, and three monographs of her paintings have been published.

Anita Klein now divides her time between studios in London and in Italy.
