= Susan A. Hutchinson =

- Hutchinson in 1928
- Born: 1873; Brooklyn, Connecticut
- Died: September 27, 1945 (aged 71–72); Hamden, Connecticut
- Education: School of Library Science at Pratt Institute
- Occupations: Librarian and curator
- Years active: 1899–1934

Susan A. Hutchinson (1873 – 27 September 1945) was a librarian at the Brooklyn Museum and the museum's first keeper of prints, from 1904 to 1934.

Hutchinson studied library science, receiving her degree from the Pratt Institute's School of Library Science in 1898. She joined the James Blackstone Memorial Library in Branford, Connecticut, rising through the ranks to acting librarian. In 1904 she joined the library of the Brooklyn Museum. As librarian, she began a print collection as part of that division's holdings. She was a founding member of the Brooklyn Society of Etchers, holding meetings in the museum. Her interest was primarily in the production of prints and as such, she installed a lithographic press in the museum for artists to use free of charge. At the same time, she mounted print exhibitions in the museum which also traveled throughout the country. During her final years as curator of prints, she edited the American section of the Fine Prints of the Year publication between 1930 and 1934.

She retired in 1934 and her collections of photographs, prints and drawings were split into separate departments in the museum, Carl O. Schniewind succeeding her in the print division and Herman DeWitter in the photographs division. Hutchinson died at her home in Hamden, Connecticut, on 27 September 1945.
