= Edward Lowinsky =

American musicologist (1908–1985)

Lowinsky in 1961–68

Edward Elias Lowinsky (January 12, 1908 – October 11, 1985) was an American musicologist. Lowinsky was one of the most prominent and influential musicologists in post-World War II America. His 1946 work on the "secret chromatic art" of Renaissance motets was hotly debated in its time, spurring considerable research into the issues of musica ficta and performance practice of early music.

== Life ==
He was born in Stuttgart, Germany to Leopold L. and Clara Rosenfeld.

Lowinsky studied piano, composition, and conducting in Stuttgart at the Hochschule für Musik, 1923–28. In 1933, he obtained his Ph.D. from the University of Heidelberg, studying under Heinrich Besseler. His dissertation was on Orlando di Lasso. Like many German Jews, he left the country after the NSDAP came to power; in early 1933, he moved to the Netherlands, living there for 6 years before emigrating to the United States. In 1947 he became a United States citizen. He taught at Black Mountain College (1942–47), Queens College, New York (1947-56), and the University of California, Berkeley (1956–61). From 1961 he taught at the University of Chicago. He was the editor of the Monuments of Renaissance Music series from 1964 to 1977 and chaired the 1971 conference on Josquin des Prez.

He did significant work preparing editions of Renaissance composers and was a major figure in redefining standards for critical editions of musical manuscripts. Most of his published articles were collected into the massive two-volume Music in the Culture of the Renaissance (1989), edited by his second wife, musicologist Bonnie J. Blackburn.

== Books ==
- Das Antwerpener Motettenbuch Orlando di Lasso’s und seine Beziehungen zum Motettenschaffen der niederländischen Zeitgenossen (dissertation, U. of Heidelberg, 1933)
- Secret Chromatic Art in the Netherlands Motet (New York, 1946)
- Tonality and Atonality in Sixteenth-Century Music (Berkeley, 1961)
- (ed. with B.J. Blackburn) Josquin des Prez: New York 1971 (proceedings of an international symposium)
- Cipriano de Rore's Venus Motet: its Poetic and Pictorial Sources (Provo, UT, 1986)
- Music in the Culture of the Renaissance and other Essays, ed. Bonnie J. Blackburn (Chicago, 1989)
- (ed. with Bonnie J. Blackburn and Clement A. Miller) A Correspondence of Renaissance Musicians (Oxford, 1990)

=== Students of Lowinsky ===
- Patricia "Patsy" Lynch Wood (1923–2004) Early Music pioneer, educator, music therapist)
