= George Eve =

English etcher

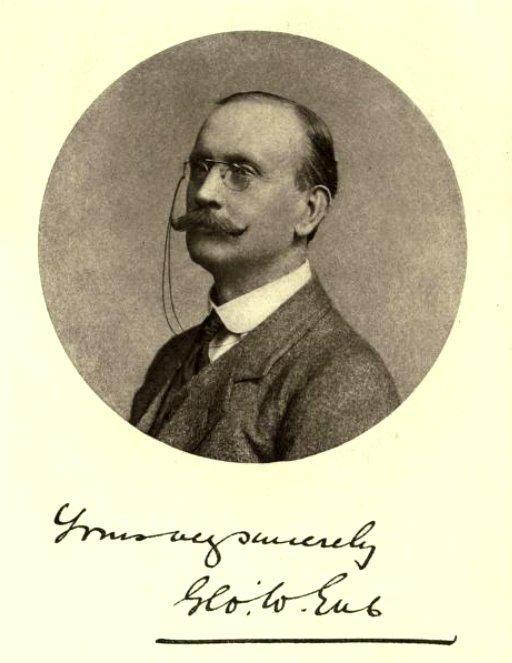
George Eve, c. 1911, and his signature.

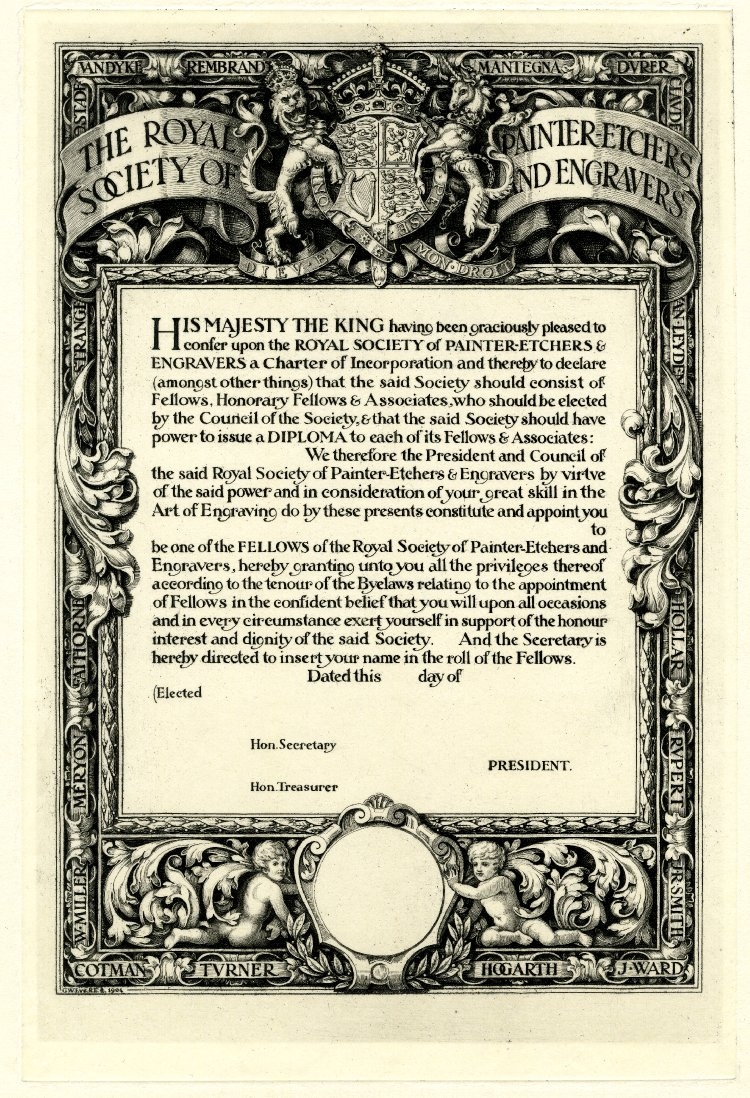
The fellows diploma of the Royal Society of Painter-Etchers and Engravers, produced by George Eve, 1904.

George William Eve, RE (1855-1914) was an English etcher, who designed bookplates and also several important British stamps. He was an authority on heraldry, a member of the Heralds' College, a Fellow of the Royal Society of Painter-Etchers and Engravers and a member of the Art Workers' Guild. When the Painter-Etchers and Engravers required a new diploma, it was Eve who was chosen from amongst their ranks to create it.

Given his background, it is not surprising that most of Eve's work was armorial in nature and black on white. Only later in life, in conjunction with Mr F.G. House, did he begin to experiment with more pictorial forms, but he died before this could be developed very far. In addition to the bookplates and stamps mentioned below, Eve designed a number of invitations to important civic events, material for the Welsh Investiture, shields and gesso decorations for the Earl of Mar and Kellie's Alloa House, Clackmannanshire, and many other items. On his death, Eve left a widow, Mary Ellen, and one son.

== Bookplates ==
Eve was a noted bookplate designer, when that was a more important form than it is now. His designs were shown at the annual exhibitions of the Ex Libris Society (formed 1891, disbanded 1908) and he designed the royal bookplates for the library at Windsor Castle. He also designed a large number of bookplates for private clients.

== Royal bookplates ==
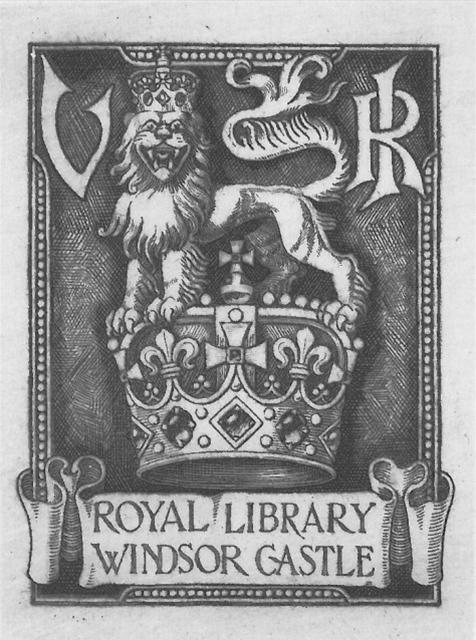
Queen Victoria, 1890s.

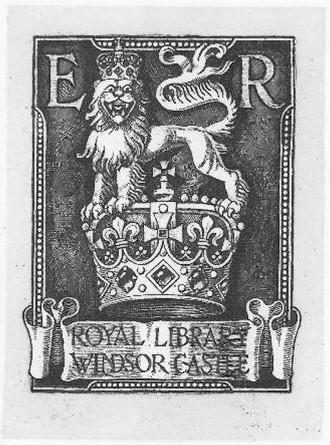
King Edward chose to retain the same basic design.

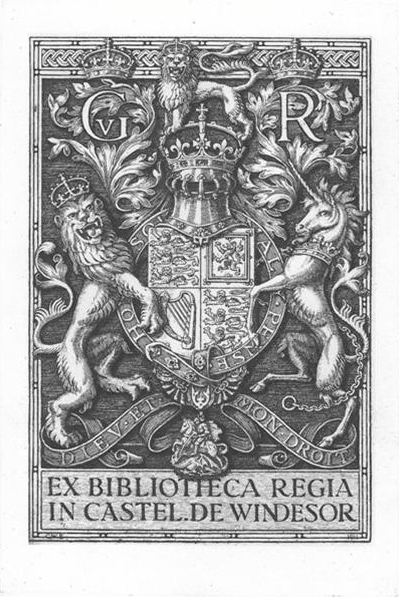
King George, 1911.

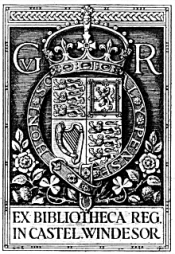
King George, 1911.

== Stamps ==
As a bookplate designer, Eve was a natural choice to design the frame of a number of British stamps. He did so for the first British postage due stamp, in around 1912-13, which he did in a style similar to that of a bookplate with the central area blank. He also designed the frame for the British Post Office Savings Bank receipt stamp and the low value definitive stamps of King George V for which his "pillar" and "wreath" designs were used.

== Other works by George Eve ==
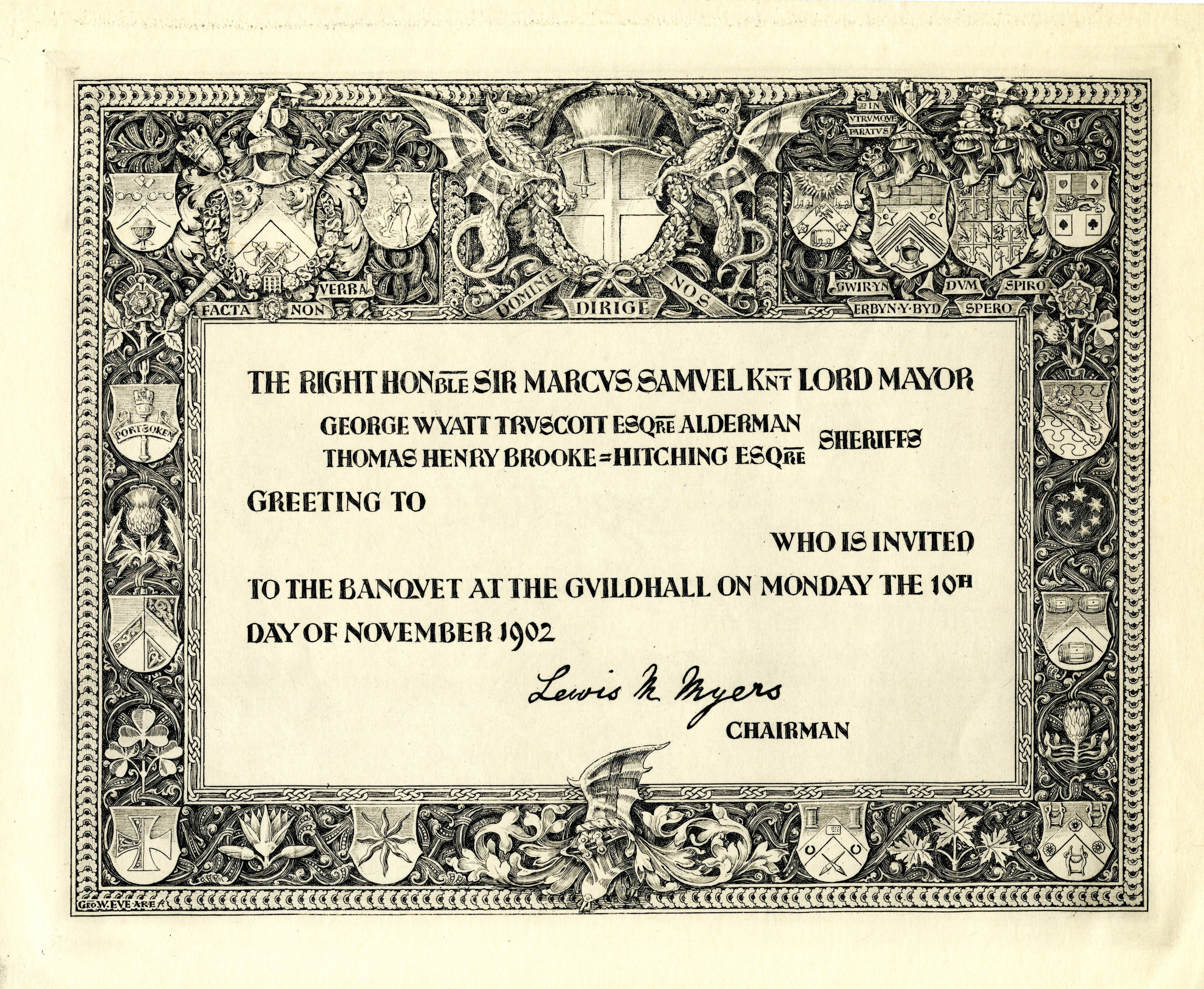
Invitation to the Lord Mayor of London's banquet, 1902.

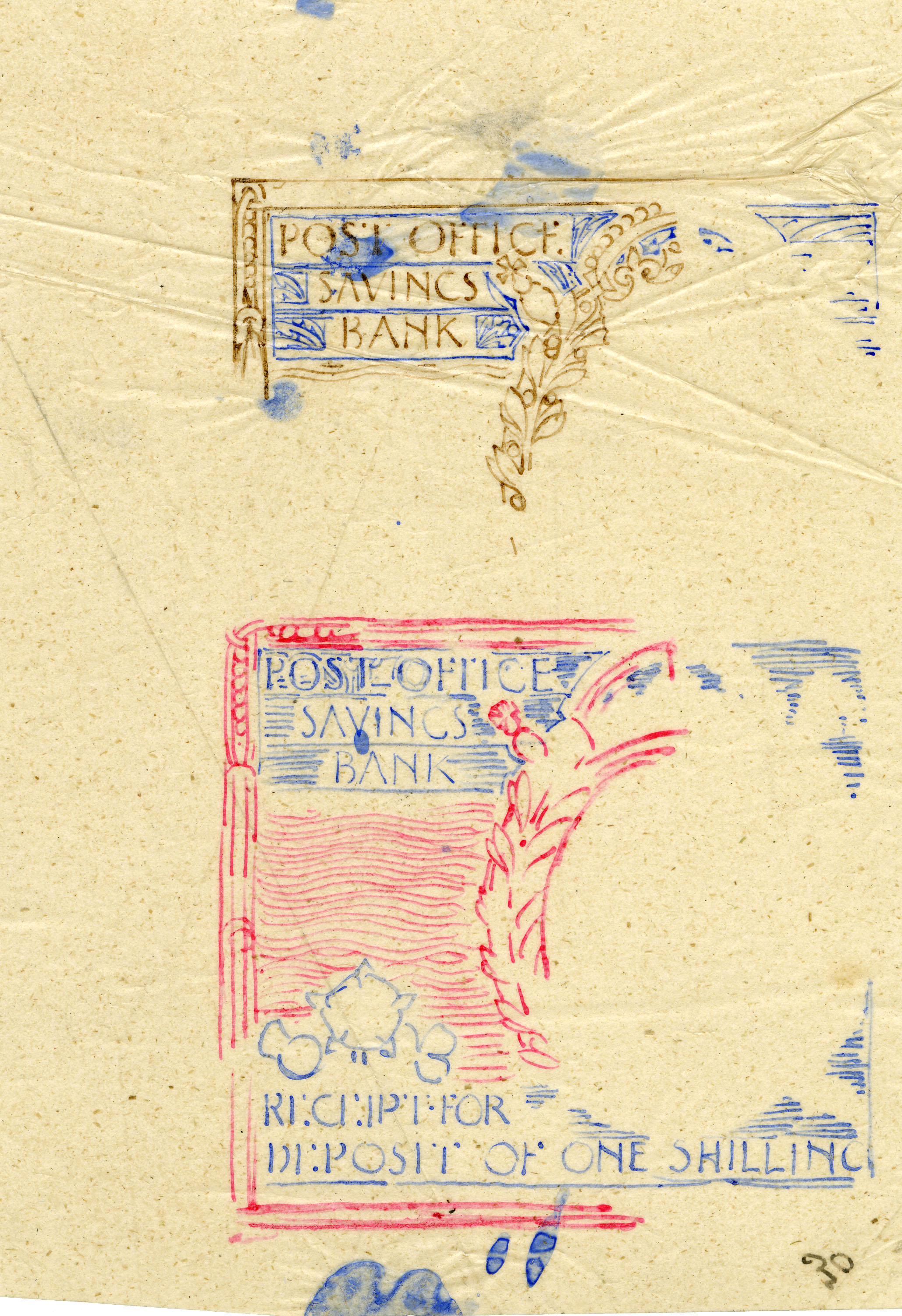
Sketch for the frame of the British P.O. Savings Bank receipt stamp, 1911.

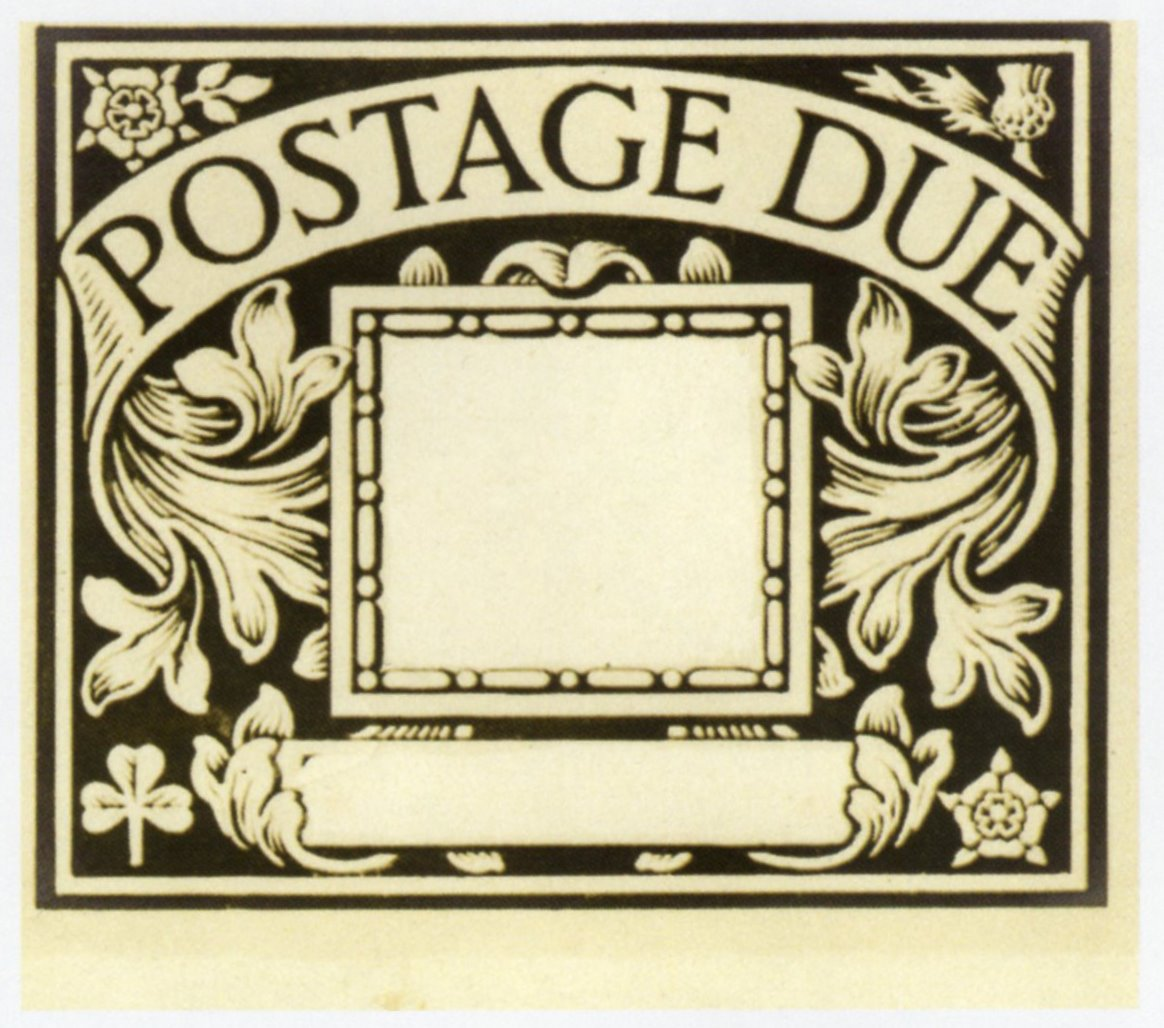
Design for the frame of the first British postage due stamp, c. 1912-13.

== Publications ==
- Heraldry as Art: An Account of Its Development and Practice, Chiefly in England. London: Bradley Thomas Batsford, 94, High Holborn. 1907. Retrieved April 3, 2025. OCLC 1369709857 (all editions).
1. Via Internet Archive (Allen County Public Library).
2. Via Internet Archive (Boston).
3. Via Internet Archive (Cal Berkeley).
4. Via Google Books (Michigan).
- Decorative Heraldry: A Practical Handbook of Its Artistic Treatment. London: George Bell & Sons. 1897. OCLC 1434466295 (all editions).
1. Via Google Books (Harvard) (1st ed.). 1897.
2. Via Google Books (Michigan) (1st ed.). 1897.
3. Via Google Books (Cal Berkeley) (2nd ed.). 1908.
