= Robert Tavener =

English painter (1920–2004)

- Born: Robert Tavener; 6 July 1920; Hampstead, London, England, UK
- Died: 12 July 2004 (aged 84); Eastbourne, East Sussex, England, UK
- Education: Göttingen University; Hornsey College of Art; University of London
- Known for: Printmaking, illustration
- Spouse: Catherine Tavener

Robert Tavener (6 July 1920 – 12 July 2004) was an English printmaker, illustrator, and teacher.

Tavener was born in Hampstead, North London, England. After school, he take an office job and then in 1940 he was called up and joined the Royal Artillery during World War II. He landed at Arromanches, Normandy, in 1944, three days after D-Day. He later studied in the arts and crafts faculty at the University of Göttingen during 1945–6, for a diploma in design at Hornsey College of Art, and for a teaching diploma at the University of London.

Robert Tavener held teaching positions at Medway College of Art in Rochester, Saint Martin's School of Art in London, and from 1953 Eastbourne College of Art and Design, where he rose to be the Head of Printmaking, Illustration and Graphic Design and Vice-Principal.

Tavener's works included linocuts, lithographs, screen-prints, woodcuts, gouache and watercolours. His subjects included the English countryside and English architecture, including Oxford and Cambridge colleges, Canterbury Cathedral, Westminster Abbey, York Minster, and Christopher Wren's London churches. Tavener's work is owned by public institutions, including over 25 public art galleries in England and Wales, and also overseas in the United States. His work was bought by the American Express, BBC, Chase Manhattan Bank, the General Post Office, the Greater London Council, London Transport, Marks & Spencer, McDonald's, Prudential Insurance, Sainsbury's, Shell, Whitbread, and Yale University.

Robert Tavener exhibited at the Royal Academy Summer Exhibition for many years. He also exhibited at Glyndebourne Festival Opera, the Barbican Centre in London, and London Weekend Television Centre at South Bank, as well as many other exhibitions sponsored by the Arts Council of Great Britain and the South East Arts Council. In 1957 his lithograph Sea Urchins was included as one of the 'Young Artists of Promise' in Jack Beddington's book. From the 1950s onwards, Tavener designed book/magazine covers and illustrations, posters, and promotional material. His illustrations appeared in publications published by Hamish Hamilton, Longmans, Methuen, Oxford University Press, Penguin Books, etc. He also produced small linocut and pen illustrations for listings in the Radio Times for the BBC.

In 1966, Tavener was elected to the Royal Society of Painter-Etchers and Engravers. He was a senior fellow of the society and was also a member of the Society of Sussex Painters.

Tavenor married his wife Catherine in 1941 during World War II. His wife died in 1998 and he died in Eastbourne, East Sussex, on 12 July 2004.

In 2010, a retrospective exhibition of his work was held in Eastbourne. His works are held by the Victoria and Albert Museum, the Government Art Collection, and the British Council.

== Bibliography ==
- Mason, Emma; Mason, Richard (2010). Robert Tavener Printmaker and Illustrator (Oh Mr Tavener I wish I had the original) (2nd ed.). Bread and Butter Press. ISBN 978-0901100917.
