= Royal Society of Painter-Printmakers =

Art institution based in London, England

Coordinates: 51°30′29″N 0°6′7″W

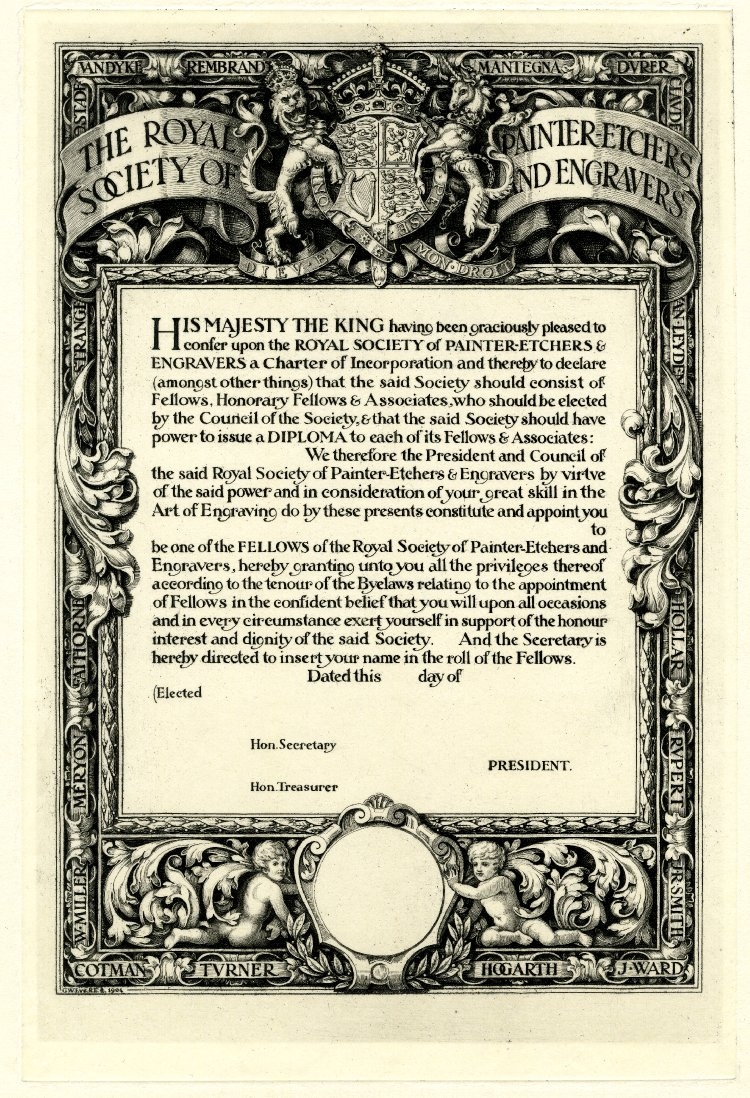
The fellows diploma of the Royal Society of Painter-Etchers and Engravers, produced by member George W. Eve in 1904.

The Royal Society of Painter-Printmakers (RE), known until 1991 as the Royal Society of Painter-Etchers and Engravers, is a leading art institution based in London, England. The Royal Society of Painter-Etchers, as it was originally styled, was a society of etchers established in London in 1880 and given a Royal Charter in 1888. Engraving was included within the scope of the Society from 1897, wood-engraving from 1920, coloured original prints from 1957,lithography from 1987 and all forms of creative forward-thinking original printmaking from 1990.

From April 2026 with approval from H.M. King Charles together with the Privy Council, the Society's official name is now the Royal Society of Printmakers to both mirror and reflect the universality of original forms of creative expression within all forms, approaches and techniques across both traditional and contemporary printmaking.

== History ==
The Society was established on 31 July 1880 at 38 Hertford Street, Mayfair, London, as the Society of Painter-Etchers for the promotion of original etching as a creative art form. The first six Fellows, all elected at this formation were Francis Seymour Haden (English, 1818–1910); Heywood Hardy (English, 1852–1926); Hubert von Herkomer RA (German/English, 1849–1914); Alphonse Legros (French, 1837–1911); Robert Walker Macbeth RA, (Scottish, 1848–1910), and James Tissot (French, 1836–1902). Samuel Palmer (English, 1805–1881) – one of only two painter-etchers to be granted posthumous Honorary Fellowship of the RE – was terminally ill at the time of the Society's formation, otherwise would have been approached. James McNeill Whistler (American, 1834–1903), who was in Venice at the time of the RE's founding, had a row with his brother-in-law, Haden, and was not invited to join. Letters in support were written to the fledgling Society by Frederick Leighton, then President of the Royal Academy, John Ruskin, Charles Dickens, John Everett Millais, and Auguste Rodin, amongst others. This Society achieved its Royal Charter granted by Queen Victoria in 1888 who bestowed on the President a gold chain of office, becoming the Royal Society of Painter-Etchers and in 1898 this was enlarged to include Engravers. Fellow, George W. Eve, designed a new Associates and Fellows diploma in 1893 and 1904.

By 1911, when HM King George V granted a Charter of Incorporation and Bye-laws, the RE, as it came to be styled, had grown in prestige and became fully established. From 1919, in token of solidarity, Presidents of the Royal Academy and the Royal Watercolour Society (RWS) have been elected Honorary Fellows of the RE. The RE's original motto – "Never Stoop to be a Copyist" – changed to "Nulla Dies Sine Linea" (No Day Without A Line) in 1920.

The Royal Society of Painter-Printmakers (formerly Royal Society of Painter-Etchers and Engravers) has had thirteen presidents (PRE) since 1880. They were: Sir Francis Seymour Haden (founder and PRE from 1880 to 1910), Professor Sir Francis Job Short (PRE from 1910 to 1938), Professor Malcolm Osborne MBE (PRE from 1938 to 1962), Professor Robert Austin (PRE from 1962 to 1970), Paul Drury (PRE from 1970 to 1975), Harry Eccleston OBE (PRE from 1975 to 1989), and Joseph Winkelman (PRE from 1989 to 1991), when the Society was renamed. Winkelman continued as president until 1995. Presidents elected by Members after this were Dr David Carpanini (PRE from 1995 to 2003), Anita Klein (PRE from 2003 to 2006), Hilary Paynter (PRE from 2006 to 2011), Dr Bren Unwin (PRE from 2011 to 2013), Mychael Barratt (PRE from 2013 to 2018).

Professor Dr David Dawson Ferry was elected President of the Royal Society of Painter-Printmakers in June 2018. Dr. Ferry was re-elected by members of the RE as President in 2023, 2024 and 2025. To support the President and help direct the affairs of the Society there is an RE Council and four RE Officers as outlined in the 1888 RE Charter: these are Vice-president Marianne Ferm (VPRE from 2024), Hon. Treasurer Louise Hayward (since 2019), Hon. Curator (Historian & Archivist) Edward Twohig (since 2021) and current Hon. Secretary of the RE is Professor Timothy Emlyn Jones (since 2022).

A strong affiliation with Guanlan International Print Biennial (China) and the Printmaking Museum of China has been made with the RE in recent years. Guanlan Original Printmaking Base covers all aspects of original printmaking: 'creation, production, display, collection, exchange, research, training and market development“.

== Membership ==
Membership, which was and still is restricted in number in order to make it a mark of distinction, is by election on the basis of work submitted to the Society's Council for peer review. In 1920 membership was expanded to allow artists who created prints from media other than metal, which allowed the election of woodcut artists such as Gwen Raverat and Noel Rooke. Another innovation in the same year was the formation of a Print Collectors' Club to be limited to 300 members each of whom received a commissioned annual presentation print by members of the RE. Unusual in any Royal Society was that work by women and men was treated equally from the outset: election based on the quality of work regardless of gender and nationality.

Full Fellows are entitled to use the post-nominals RE. Associates, a class of members established in 1887, can use ARE. ARE's are elevated to RE full membership by majority vote election by the RE Council.

Notable members (and their date of election to a full fellowship) included: Mary Nimmo Moran (1881), William Strang (1881), Joseph Pennell (1882), Auguste Rodin (1882), Charles William Sherborn (1884), Herbert Dicksee (1885), Walter Sickert (1887), Sir David Young Cameron (1895), Margaret Kemp-Welch (1901), Sir Frank Brangwyn (1903), Anna Airy (1908), Eugène Béjot (1908), Ernest Stephen Lumsden (1915), William Walcot (1920), Edmund Blampied (1921), Gerald Brockhurst (1921), Robert Austin (1927), Dame Laura Knight (1932), Sir William Russell Flint (1933), Charles Tunnicliffe (1934), Geoffrey Wedgwood (1934), Joan Hassall (1948), James T.A. Osborne (1957), Gwenda Morgan (1962), and Robert Tavener (1966). Others were elected as an Associate but did not achieve the full fellowship, such as Eli Marsden Wilson (1907), John Nicolson (1923) and Salomon van Abbé (1923).

Since 1980 the Society is based at the Bankside Gallery in London.

== References and sources ==
Sources

- Newbolt A.R.E., Sir Francis (1930). The History of the Royal Society of Painter-Etchers & Engravers, 1880–1930. London: Publication No. 9, The Print Collector's Club (P.C.C. of The Royal Society of Painter Printmakers)
- Hopkinson Hon. R.E., Martin (1999). No day without a line. The History of the Royal Society of Painter-Printmakers, 1880–1999. Oxford: Ashmolean Museum.
- Twohig R.E., Edward (2018). Print REbels: Haden-Palmer-Whistler and the Origins of the R.E. (Royal Society of Painter-Printmakers) published by the Royal Society of Painter Printmakers ISBN 978-1-5272-1775-1
