= Bonnie J. Blackburn =

American musicologist

Bonnie Jean Blackburn (July 15, 1939, in Albany, New York – March 19, 2026) was an American musicologist.

== Career ==
She graduated in 1970 from the University of Chicago with a PhD. She studied with Edward Lowinsky and Howard Mayer Brown. She was lecturer at Northwestern University, and visiting faculty member at the University of Chicago in 1986, and University at Buffalo, The State University of New York in 1989–90. She moved to Oxford in 1990 and became a freelance editor.

She married Edward Lowinsky (died 1985) and subsequently Leofranc Holford-Strevens. She was a corresponding member of the American Musicological Society, and was elected a Fellow of the British Academy in 2005. She died in March, 2026.

== Awards ==
- 1988 Guggenheim Fellowship.
- 2005 Fellow of the British Academy.

== Works ==
- With Edward E. Lowinsky & Clement A. Miller, A Correspondence of Renaissance Musicians, Oxford University Press, 1991
- The Oxford Companion to the Year, Bonnie J. Blackburn, Leofranc Holford-Strevens, Oxford University Press, 1999, ISBN 0-19-214231-3
- "Two Treasure Chests of Canonic Antiquities", Canons and Canonic Techniques, 14th-16th Centuries: theory, practice, and reception history], Editors Katelijne Schiltz, Bonnie J. Blackburn, Peeters Publishers, 2007, ISBN 978-90-429-1681-4
- "Lorenzo de Medicii, A Lost Isaac Manuscript, and the Venetian Ambassador", Música franca: essays in honor of Frank A. D'Accone, Editors Frank A. D'Accone, Irene Alm, Alyson McLamore, Colleen Reardon, Pendragon Press, 1996, ISBN 978-0-945193-92-0
- "Masses Based on Popular Songs and Solmization Syllables", The Josquin Companion, Editor Richard Sherr, Oxford University Press, 2000, ISBN 978-0-19-816335-0, pp. 51-88.
- Music As Concept and Practice in the Late Middle Ages, Edited Reinhard Strohm, Bonnie J. Blackburn, Oxford University Press, 2009, ISBN 978-0-19-816205-6
- Uno gentile et subtile ingenio: studies in Renaissance music in honour of Bonnie J. Blackburn, Editors Mary Jennifer Bloxam, Gioia Filocamo, Leofranc Holford-Strevens, Turnhout: Brepols, 2009
- Blackburn, Bonnie J.; Stras, Laurie, eds. (2016). Eroticism in early modern music. London New York: Routledge. ISBN 9781472443335.
