= Leofranc Holford-Strevens =

English classical scholar

Leofranc Holford-Strevens (born 19 May 1946) is an English classical scholar, an authority on the works of Aulus Gellius, and a former reader for the Oxford University Press.

He was married to the American musicologist Bonnie J. Blackburn until her death in 2026.

== Career ==
After Southgate County Grammar School, in 1963 Holford-Strevens attended Christ Church, Oxford, to study Literae Humaniores (a form of classical studies), and stayed on to obtain his doctorate there with a dissertation entitled Select Commentary on Aulus Gellius, Book 2 (1971).

In 1971 Holford-Strevens started work with the Oxford University Press as a graduate proof reader and later rose to become consultant scholar-editor there. His first book-length publication, Aulus Gellius, was published in 1988. Holford-Strevens's book was hailed by Hugh Lloyd-Jones as a masterpiece characterized by a "sharp critical intelligence". More generally, Lloyd-Jones stated that Holford-Strevens was one of the most learned men in England, comparing him to Sebastiano Timpanaro, who also managed to combine a career in a publishing house with world-class contributions to scholarship.

Numerous anecdotes circulate concerning his mannerisms, from his being barred from a college dining room on account of what were called his "mediaeval eating manners" to his ability to navigate streets while buried in The Times, and yet managing to miss running into lampposts. Another anecdote suggests that W. H. Auden once called on dons entertaining him in Oxford to stop chatting, explaining that he wished to listen to Holford-Strevens's conversation as he held forth in another corner of the room.

By the time of his retirement in 2011, Holford-Strevens had proof-read or edited over 500 books, and in retirement he is still active and is working on a new commentary on Gellius. He lives in St Bernard's Road, Oxford. In 2019, his two-volume critical edition of Aulus Gellius' Attic Nights was published.

His work as a copy-editor was recognized in 2016 by the award of the British Academy President's Medal for outstanding service to the cause of the humanities and social sciences.

== Languages ==
Holford-Strevens's interest in languages was stimulated by his father, a company secretary, who introduced him at an early age to French, Spanish, and German. He learnt Russian as a young boy out of curiosity when the Sputnik was launched in 1957, desiring to match a classmate who wished to know the tongue of the people who managed the technological feat. According to Sir Keith Thomas, his ability to read forty languages made him a legendary figure at Oxford. He reads all the Romance languages.

== Selected publications ==
- Aulus Gellius, London: Duckworth, 1988.
- 'The Harmonious Pulse,' Classical Quarterly 43 (02):475- (1993)
- 'Her Eyes Became Two Spouts': Classical Antecedents of Renaissance Laments,' in Early Music Vol. 27, No. 3, Laments (Aug. 1999), pp. 379–393 : Oxford University Press
- 'Sophocles at Rome,' in Jasper Griffin (ed.),Sophocles Revisited. Essays presented to Sir Hugh Lloyd-Jones, Oxford: Oxford University Press, 1999 pp. 219–59.
- with B. Blackburn, The Oxford Companion to the Year, (Oxford, 1999);
- with B. Blackburn, The Oxford Book of Days, (Oxford, 2000).
- 'Getting away with murder: The literary and forensic fortune of two Roman Exempla,' in International Journal of the Classical Tradition Vol.7, Issue 4, June 2001 pp. 489–514
- 'Humanism and the language of music treatises,' Renaissance Studies, Volume 15, Issue 4, pages 415–449, December 2001
- 'Horror vacui in Lucretian biography,' Leeds International Classical Studies, 1.1 2002
- Gellius: An Antonine Scholar and his Achievement, Oxford University Press, 2003. Revised ed. of Holford-Strevens, 1988
- with Amiel Vardi (eds.), The Worlds of Aulus Gellius, Oxford University Press 2004
  - 'Recht as een Palmen-Bohm and Other Facets of Gellius' Medieval and Humanistic Reception,' in L.Holford-Strevens, A. Vardi (2004) pp. 249–81.
- The History of Time: A Very Short Introduction, Oxford: Oxford University Press, 2005.
- 'Sirens in Antiquity and the Middle Ages,' in Linda Austern, Inna Naroditskaya (eds.) Music of the Sirens, Indiana University Press, 2006 pp. 25–50
- 'Selinus or Athens?,' The Classical Quarterly (New Series), Volume 59 Issue 2 December 2009, pp 624–626
- 'Church Politics and the Computus: From Milan to the Ends of the Earth,' in The Easter controversy of late Antiquity and the early Middle Ages: Proceedings of the 2nd international conference on the science of Computus in Ireland and Europe, pages 1–20, 2011
- 'Fa mi la mi so la:The Erotic Implications of Solmization syllables,' Bonnie J. Blackburn, Laurie Stras, (eds.) Eroticism in Early Modern Music, Ashgate Publishing 2015 pp. 43–58

== Citations ==
=== References ===
- Holford-Strevens, Leofranc (22 May 2003). "God's Will". London Review of Books. 25 (10): 15–16.
- Holford-Strevens, Leofranc (8 October 2015). "Eating or Being Eaten: Animal Grammar". London Review of Books. 37 (19): 37–38.
- Holford-Strevens, Leofranc (20 November 2003). "They got egg on their faces". London Review of Books. 25 (22): 29–30.
- Holford-Strevens, Leofranc (17 February 2005). "Dithyrambs for Athens: The difficulties of reading Pindar". London Review of Books. 27 (4): 33–34.
- Holford-Strevens, Leofranc (2003). Aulus Gellius : An Antonine Scholar and his Achievement. Oxford University Press.
- Holford-Strevens, Leofranc (9 July 2009). "Peter opened Paul the door". London Review of Books. 31 (13): 25–26.
- Little, Reg (18 May 2011). "The last of the Romans". The Oxford Times.
- Lloyd-Jones, Hugh (24 December 1988). "The ancient world seen from the inside". The Spectator. p. 69.
- Lloyd-Jones, Hugh (1991). Greek in a Cold Climate. Rowman & Littlefield. ISBN 9780389209676.
- Walsh, John (22 February 1999). "The sheriff of Dulwich Village County". The Independent.
