= John Nicolson (artist) =

British artist, etcher and illustrator

John Nicolson (born London, 28 December 1891; died London, 3 September 1951) was a British artist, etcher and illustrator for books and periodicals.

John Nicolson, known as 'Jock', was an Associate of the Royal Society of Painter-Etchers and Engravers (A.R.E.), a member of the Royal Society of British Artists (R.B.A), and a member of the Royal Watercolour Society (R.W.S.). He worked for magazines such as The Bystander and Piccadilly and for book publishers such as T. Fisher Unwin, Thomas Nelson and Blackie and Son. He was well known for his drawings of dogs. He signed his work for books and periodicals 'Nick', typically underlined and with two small circles at either end. Nicolson and his wife Dorothy née Hildersley shared a house in south London between 1923 - 26 with the artist Edmund Blampied and his wife Marianne. Nicolson died aged 59 in a traffic accident in London in September 1951. He left behind a wife and two children, one of whom, Beatrice (Betty), was also an artist and a photographer, and was married to Albert Irvin R.A. (1922-2015).
