= Salomon van Abbé =

Dutch-English artist (1883–1955)

- Born: 31 July 1883; Amsterdam, Netherlands
- Died: 28 February 1955 (aged 71); London, United Kingdom
- Other names: Jack van Abbé; Jack Abbey
- Education: People's Palace, Toynbee Hall, Central School of Art, London County Council School of Photo-engraving and Lithography at Bolt Court
- Occupations: Artist, etcher, and illustrator
- Organization: Associate of the Royal Society of Painter-Etchers Member of the Royal Society of British Artists (RBA) President of the London Sketch Club Member of the Art Workers Guild
- Spouse: Hannah Wolff (m. 1914)
- Children: 2
- Awards: Bronze medal at the Paris Salon, 1939

Salomon van Abbé (31 July 1883 – 28 February 1955), also known as Jack van Abbé or Jack Abbey, was an English and Dutch-Jewish artist, etcher, and illustrator of books and magazines.

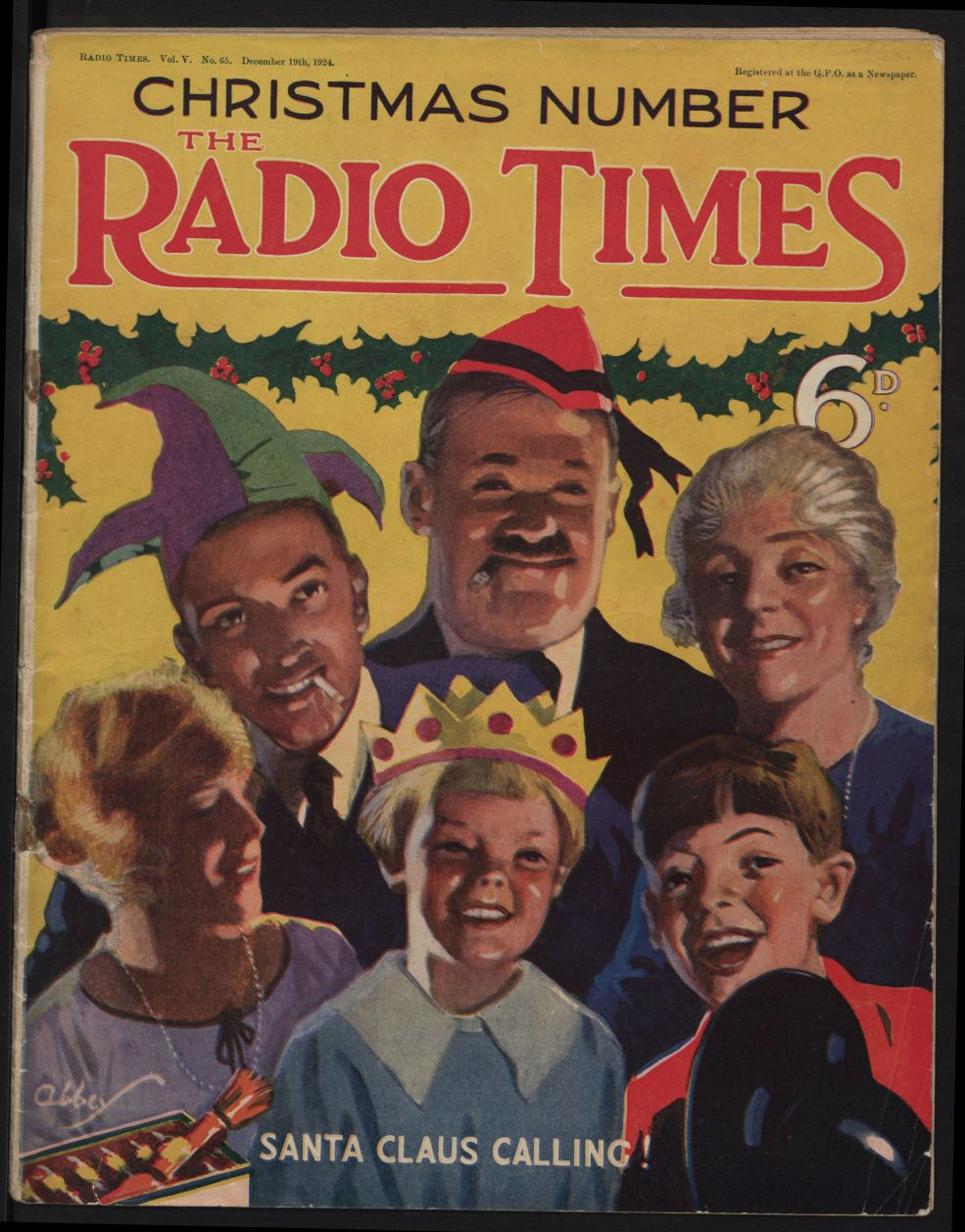
Cover of the 1924 Christmas edition of Radio Times magazine

== Early years ==
Abbé was born in The Netherlands but moved with his family to England when he was five years old and became a naturalised citizen. He added the accent to his name, becoming van Abbé. He studied at local state schools, the People's Palace, Toynbee Hall, Central School of Art and at the London County Council School of Photo-engraving and Lithography at Bolt Court, where he met Edmund Blampied, Robert Charles Peter and John Nicolson – all fellow etchers.

== Memberships ==
In 1923, Abbé was elected an Associate of the Royal Society of Painter-Etchers and was a member of the Royal Society of British Artists (RBA), as well as President of the London Sketch Club and a member of the Art Workers Guild.

He was awarded a bronze medal at the Paris Salon in 1939.

== Work ==
Salomon van Abbé was noted for his drypoints of the legal profession and the law. He signed much of his commercial work as an illustrator "Abbey", or "S. Abbey" to distinguish himself from his brother, Joseph van Abbé, who signed himself "J. Abbey". (In the 1911 census, the van Abbé family gave their surname as Abbey.) He also used the pseudonym "C. Morse" because of problems with publishers.

Much of Abbé's commercial work was to design the dust jackets for books from for publishers such as Ward Lock & Co, Collins, Thomas Nelson, Thornton Butterworth, Methuen, John Murray, Skeffingtons, Hamish Hamilton, Nash and Grayson and Herbert Jenkins. Because his work for publishers was so prolific, he designed the jackets of many notable books published in the 1920s and 1930s, including the first "Saint" book by Leslie Charteris (Meet the Tiger, Ward Lock, 1928), The Mystery of the Blue Train by Agatha Christie (William Collins, Sons, 1928) and the first two novels by Dorothy L. Sayers (T. Fisher Unwin). In the 1950s he illustrated several children's books for Dent, including Treasure Island, Tanglewood Tales, Little Women and Good Wives. Other notable works he illustrated were William Caine's The Strangeness of Noel Carton for Herbert Jenkins in 1920, John Galsworthy's Loyalties for Duckworth in 1930, William Kent's My Lord Mayor and the City of London (Herbert Jenkins, 1947), and Carola Oman's Robin Hood (Dent, 1949). He also painted the front covers for the Christmas issue of Radio Times in 1924 and 1925.

Van Abbé has paintings in national collections in the United Kingdom.

== Family ==
Abbé was the eldest of four children born to Dutch Jewish parents Rachel (née Rose) and Maurice van Abbe. His younger brother, Joseph, was also an artist and illustrator who used the name J. Abbey in his own work.

Salomon van Abbé married Hannah Wolff on 3 August 1914 in Stoke Newington, now part of London. They had two sons.
