= Frederick Clifford Dixon =

20th century English printmaker and art teacher

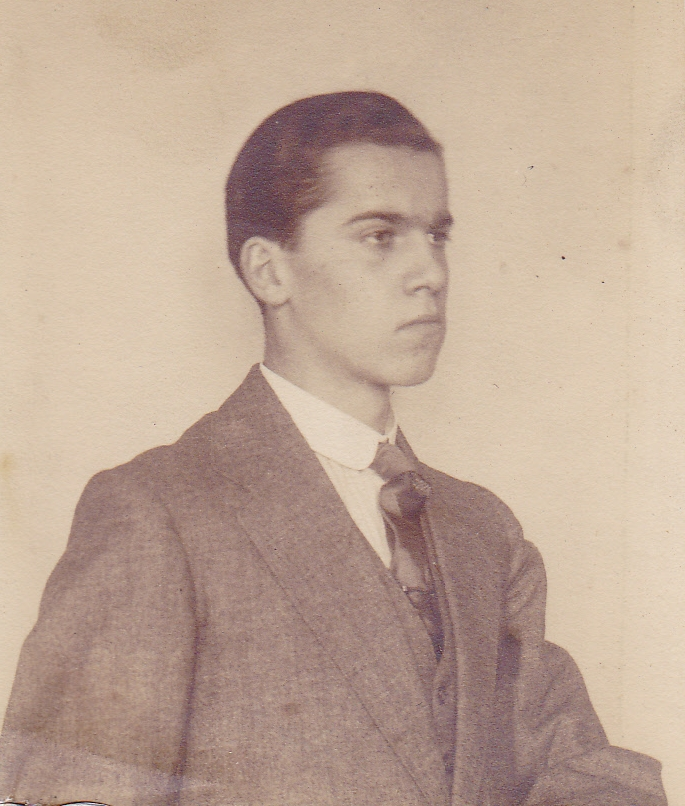
A portrait of Frederick Clifford Dixon, 1920's

Frederick Clifford Dixon (5 December 1902 – 5 May 1992) was notable for his etchings depicting urban life in London in an intricate, realistic and witty manner. His artistic career was cut short with the decline in the print market after the boom years of the 1920s. He then embarked on a career as an art teacher in order to make a living.

== Personal life ==
Frederick Clifford Dixon (also known as Charles) was born in Derby in 1902. His initial art training took place at Derby School of Art and Crafts (1920–1924) before attending the School of Engraving at the Royal College of Art (RCA) in London (1924–1928) with the assistance of a small scholarship from Derby Education Authority. He gained a Diploma in Etching in 1927 and a Teacher's Certificate in 1928 (SoA Archives).

By the time Dixon graduated from the RCA the decline in the etching market had begun, a decline compounded by the negative economic consequences of the Wall Street crash in America in October 1929.

In the years that followed many artists ceased etching and took up other professions. Dixon used his teaching qualification, awarded in his last year at the RCA, to become an art teacher. He taught in schools in the next four decades in Morecambe Bay, Ashton-under-Lyne, Altrincham and finally Cheshire Council Training College in Alsager until 1963. He had not been able to serve in the 2nd World War, he was ruled medically unfit because he had had tuberculosis in childhood. After retiring from teaching in 1963 Dixon moved to Goring-on-Thames. In retirement he had a small sailing boat on the Thames and was an active member of the local history society until his death in 1992.

In 1933 he married Chris Glover and they had one son, John, born in 1937.

== Royal College of Art ==
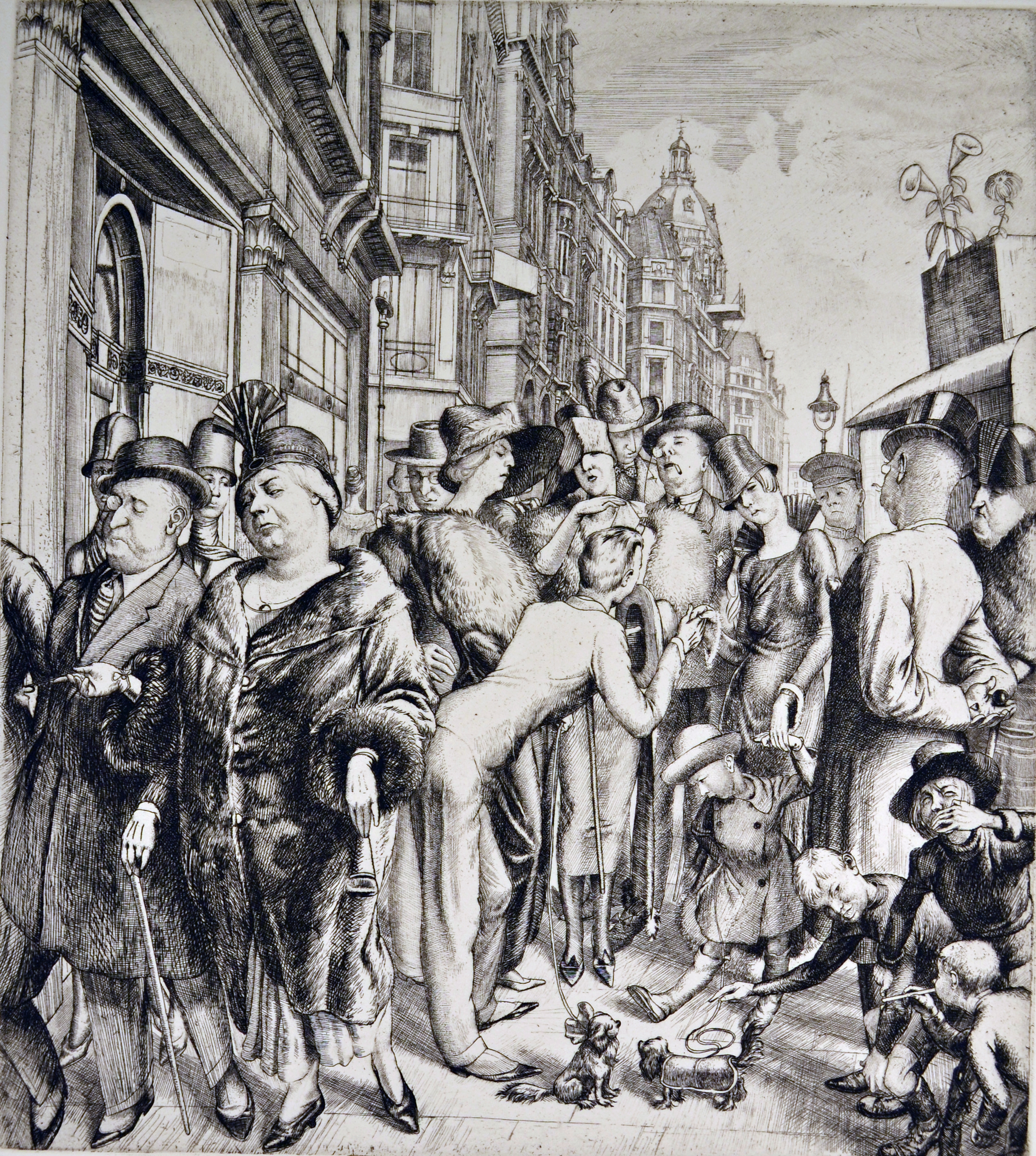
Regent Street Etching by Frederick Clifford Dixon, 1927

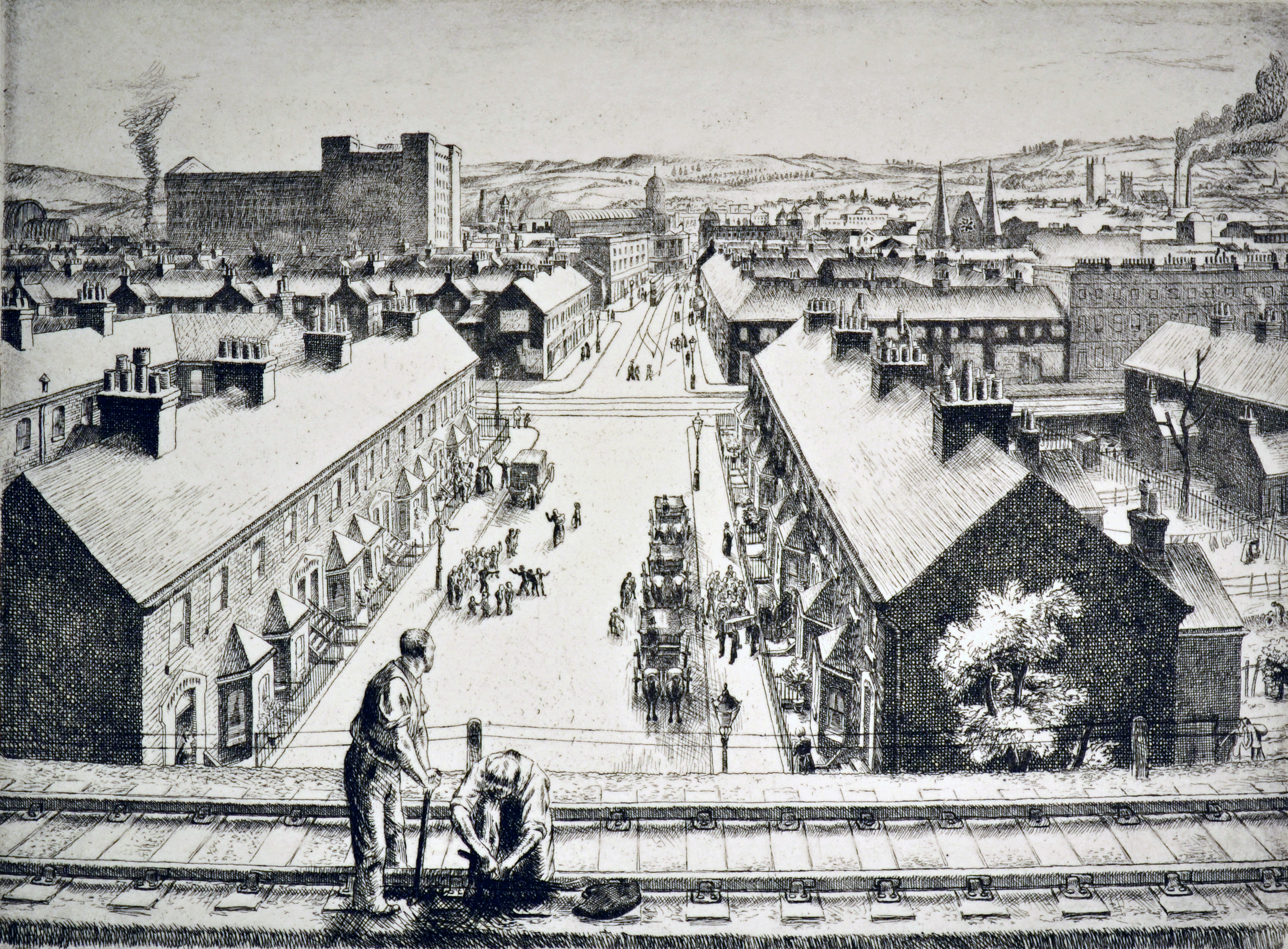
Northern Town Etching by Frederick Clifford Dixon, 1928

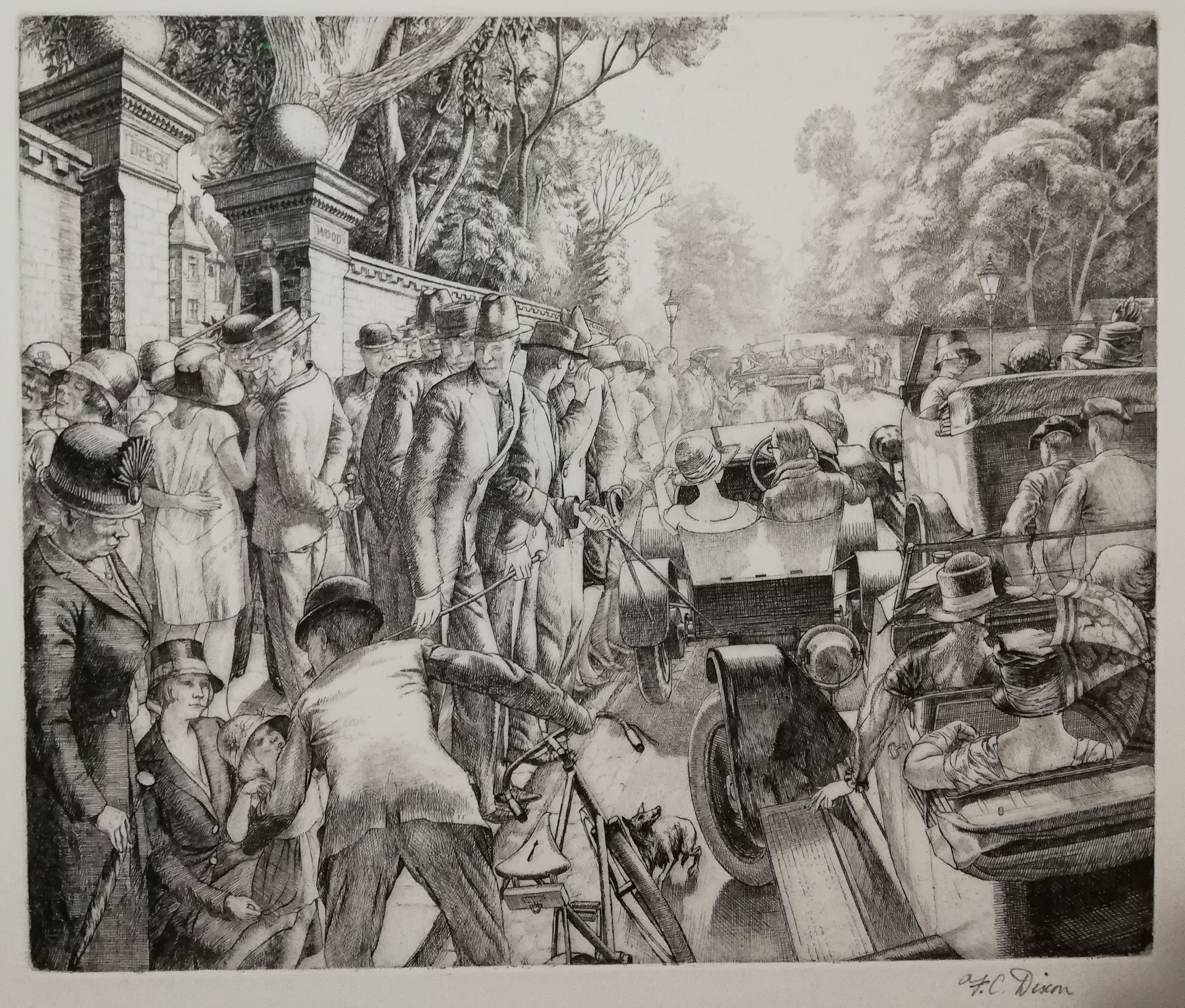

At the time Dixon was attending the RCA, William Rothenstein was principal, Malcolm Osborne RA was the Professor of Engraving and Job Nixon was Osborne's assistant lecturer and a winner of the Prix de Rome Scholarship in Engraving (1920).

Dixon studied alongside some of the major figures in British early twentieth century printmaking, such as Edward Bawden, Eric Ravillious, Charles Tunnicliffe, a friend of Dixon, Marion Adnams, Evelyn Gibbs, Kenneth Holmes and Grace Golden. He graduated with fellow students Frederick Austin, Stanley Badmin, Enid Butcher, Ceri G. Richards and James Cresser Tarr.

Dixon was encouraged by Rothenstein to become a professional artist but he decided that it was not the career for him; partly because the print market was already in decline having taken a 'fatal knock in the Great Crash of 1929' and partly because he felt that he produced work too slowly to make a decent living.

== Artwork ==
During his short artistic career Dixon used his 'keen sense of observation' to produce intricate etchings that capture wonderfully a sense of the period. Contemporary critics noted his ability to depict 'human characteristics of different types', 'treated in a realistic and humorous manner'.

Whilst a student at the RCA Dixon exhibited his etching The British Museum Portico, Night at the Royal Academy Exhibition in 1926. This print, along with five others, is now in the collection of The British Museum, Department of Prints and Drawings. This etching was chosen by Sir Muirhead Bone, along with other the work of other notable printmakers of the day, including Stanley Anderson, C R W Nevinson, Job Nixon and William Strange RA, for display on the walls of the banking hall of Williams Deacon's Bank Limited, West End Office 9, Pall Mall, S.W.1. The Museum of London also holds a number of Dixon's prints.

Dixons work was shown extensively during 1927 in a number of exhibitions including The British School of Rome Imperial Gallery of Art, the New English Art Gallery where his etching Putney Hill: Sunday Morning was described as 'bright and lively', and The Royal College of Art Sketch Club Exhibition noted the work as 'strongly satirical' with a 'feeling for the social "aura" of a place'. He also exhibited in art galleries in Derby and Nottingham.

The Sphere described his work at the New English Art Club as

"Transcending the almost maniacal distortion of the pioneers of the modern movement".

== Donation to Aberystwyth University ==
A recent exhibition at the Aberystwyth University School of Art Gallery (30 November 2015 – 15 January 2016) featured not only thirteen of Dixon's own etchings of British urban and rural life but also twenty-three prints by his contemporaries which he acquired by exchange or gift. As a result of this exhibition a number of Dixon's works were given to the collection by the family. The collection in Aberystwyth now has the most comprehensive holdings of Dixon's work. Included in the acquisition were a number of his etchings and preparatory drawings for Regents Street (1927) and Putney Hill (1926) and a pencil portrait of Ceri Giraldus Richards made in the mid-1920s.
