= David Strang =

David Strang may refer to:

- David Maxwell Strang (born 1968), former Scottish middle-distance runner who won a gold medal at the 1994 European Indoor Championships in Paris
- David Strang (inventor), patented instant coffee
- David Strang (police officer), current Her Majesty's Chief Inspector of Prisons for Scotland and a former Chief Constable of the Lothian and Borders Police
- David Strang (printmaker) (1887 – 1967), British artist
