= Marion Adnams =

British artist (1898–1995)

Marion Elizabeth Adnams
- Born: 3 December 1898; Derby, England
- Died: 24 October 1995 (aged 96); Derby, England
- Education: University College, Nottingham (BA)
- Known for: Surrealist painting

Marion Elizabeth Adnams (3 December 1898 – 24 October 1995) was an English painter, printmaker and draughtswoman. She is notable for her surrealist paintings, in which apparently unconnected objects appear together in unfamiliar, often outdoor, environments. Some of her paintings depict landscapes and landmarks close to, or within, her native town of Derby.

== Biography ==
Adnams was born on 3 December 1898 at 22 Otter Street, Derby, the only daughter of John Frederick Adnams and his wife, Mary Elizabeth Smith. Her artistic interests were encouraged from an early age by her father, himself a woodwork teacher at Derby School. After attending Parkfield Cedars School in Derby, she expressed a desire to study art but was instead urged to go on and study at University College, Nottingham, where she obtained a Bachelor of Arts in Modern Languages in 1919. Between 1927 and 1930, Adnams travelled to Belgium, France, and Italy, executing woodcuts of the architecture she encountered en route, and exhibiting them to some acclaim at Derby Art Gallery and elsewhere locally with the Derby Women's Art Club. She began her career not as a language teacher, but as art mistress at Derby's Central School for Girls before being recommended for a transfer to the newly opened Homelands Grammar School for Girls, by the Derbyshire Education Committee, in October 1937. She was appointed senior lecturer at Derby Diocesan Training College in 1948, where she rose to become Head of Art.

Between 1938 and 1970, Adnams painted the surrealist works for which she is principally known, exhibiting at the British Art Centre in London, alongside Duncan Grant, Augustus John, Henry Moore, Jacob Epstein, and Eileen Agar. In 1944 she exhibited her work at the Modern Art Gallery in London, alongside Jack Bilbo and Max Ernst. In 1939, Adnams sold her first painting, The Living Tree (1939), to Manchester Art Gallery for inclusion in their Rutherson Collection of Modern Art for Schools. Further sales of her paintings to Derby Art Gallery from 1945 and to the Salford Museum and Art Gallery and Nottingham Castle Museums from the early 1950s have ensured her work a measure of public presence.

Adnams retired in 1960 aged sixty-one, using her time to develop her art in new directions. She acquired a second home in France, producing paintings and drawings influenced by the landscape of Provence and elsewhere. In 1966 she painted a series of murals for the Immanuel Church in Stapenhill, near Burton upon Trent. In 1968, at the age of seventy, she became partially blind. As her condition worsened, she was left unable to paint. She died in Derby on Tuesday 24 October 1995, aged ninety-six years old. Her funeral was held at Derby Cathedral on Thursday 2 November 1995, before burial at Nottingham Road Cemetery in Derby.

== Exhibitions ==
- 1939: First Exhibition of Paintings, Sculptures, and Watercolours by Members of the British Art Centre, at the Stafford Gallery, London
- 1940: People and Flowers: the Fourth Exhibition of the British Art Centre, at the Stafford Gallery, London
- 1940: Limelight, at the Stafford Gallery, London
- 1943: Northern Artists Exhibition, at Manchester Art Gallery
- 1944: 'The World of Imagination' An Exhibition of 'Oodles', Abstracts, Surrealism, 'Merz'-Sculpture, Constructivism and Symbolism, at the Modern Art Gallery Limited, London
- 1944: Exhibition of paintings by Marion Adnams, at Derby Art Gallery, Derby
- 1945: Exhibition of Contemporary Oil Paintings, at Castle Art Gallery, Nottingham
- 1945: This Extraordinary Year: annual exhibition by members of the Artists International Association, at Whitechapel Art Gallery, London.
- 1946: Rutherston collection on view in Leeds
- 1946: Something for Everybody, at Derby Art Gallery
- 1947: Accent on Form, at Salford Art Gallery, Manchester
- 1948: 'Art for Art's Sake' Midland Regional Group Exhibition, in Nottingham
- 1948: Midland Artists Display, in Nottingham
- 1949: Exhibition of paintings by Marion Adnams, in Nottingham
- 1956: An exhibition of painting and sculpture, at 102 Belper Road, Derby
- 1957: Marion Adnams and Evelyn Gibbs joint show, at The Midland Group Gallery, Nottingham
- 1960: Local artists show, at Derby Art Gallery
- 1961: Midland Group Autumn show, in Nottingham
- 1962: Open Exhibition, at Salford Gallery, Manchester
- 1963: Pictures for Schools exhibition, at the Midland Group Gallery, Nottingham
- 1962: Paintings and Drawings of Marion Adnams, at The Rose and Crown, Fletchling
- 1964: Paintings and Drawings of Marion Adnams, at Phoenix Theatre, Leicester
- 1965: Midland Group Show, at Leicester Art Gallery, Leicester
- 1966: Leicester University Arts Festival
- 1966: One-man show in the Little Gallery, Midland Group, Nottingham
- 1967: Exhibition at Derby Playhouse
- 1968: Marion Adnams, John Dalton and Dorothie Field joint exhibition, at Midland Group Gallery, Nottingham
- 1969: Marion Adnams paintings 1939-1969, at Abbotsholme School, Rocester, Uttoxeter
- 1971: Marion Adnams: a Retrospective Exhibition of Paintings and Drawings, at the Midland Group Gallery in Nottingham
- 1990: Jack Bilbo and the Modern Art Gallery 1941-1948, at England & Co Gallery, London
- 1995: British and European Surrealism, at Wolverhampton Art Gallery and Museum
- 2009: Imagining Landscapes, at Derby Museum and Art Gallery, Derby
- 2009: Angels of Anarchy: Women Artists and Surrealism, at Manchester Art Gallery
- 2010: Later Flowering of Surrealism, at Scottish National Gallery of Modern Art, Edinburgh
- 2011: Three Stones in the City of Ladies, at Nottingham Castle Museum
- 2017: John Armstrong: Dream and Reality, at The Atkinson, Southport
- 2017: Dreamers Awake, at White Cube, Bermondsey
- 2018: Women in Collections, at Nottingham Castle and Art Gallery
- 2017-18: Marion Adnams - A Singular Woman at Derby Museum and Art Gallery, Derby
- 2018: The House Of Fame, at Nottingham Contemporary, Nottingham
- 2018-19: Exploding Collage, at Hatton Gallery, Newcastle
- 2019: 50/50; Fifty Works by Fifty British Women Artists 1900 – 1950 curated by Sacha Llewellyn, London and Leeds
- 2019: Strange Coast - Cathie Pilkington and Marion Adnams at Transition Two, London
- 2020: British Surrealism curated by David Boyd Haycock, Dulwich Picture Gallery
- 2021: WOW Women Only Works on Paper at Laing Art Gallery, Newcastle
- 2021: Curiouser and Curiouser at Victoria and Albert Museum, London
- 2023: Private and Public: Finding the Modern British Garden at The Garden Museum, London
- 2023: Vernissage de l’exposition Surréalisme au féminin? at Au Musee de Monmartre Jardins Renoir, Paris.
- 2023: Marion Adnams: Into the Enchanted Country permanent exhibition at Derby Museum and Art Gallery, Derby.
- 2024: Butterfly Time: Part 1 at Richard Saltoun Gallery, NYC.
- 2024: Forbidden Territories: 100 years of Surrealist Landscapes at Hepworth Wakefield Gallery, Wakefield.
- 2024-2026: Imagine 100 Years of International Surrealism. Touring Exhibition: The Royal Museum of Fine Arts Belgium, Brussels. Centre Pompidou, Musée national d’Art Moderne, Paris. Hamburger Kunsthalle. Fundación Mapfré, Madrid. Philadelphia Museum of Art.

== Legacy ==
Adnam's work can be found in numerous public art collections, including those of Manchester Art Gallery, Salford Museums, Nottingham Castle Museum and Art Gallery, Leicestershire County Council, and the Scottish National Gallery of Modern Art. The largest public collection of her work is with the Derby Museums Trust. A permanent display of her work was opened in the gallery in December 2023

In 2011, the British milliner Stephen Jones designed and created a range of hats, titled Drifting and Dreaming, inspired by the work of Marion Adnams.

== See also ==
- Women surrealists
