= David Strang (printmaker) =

British printmaker (1887–1967)

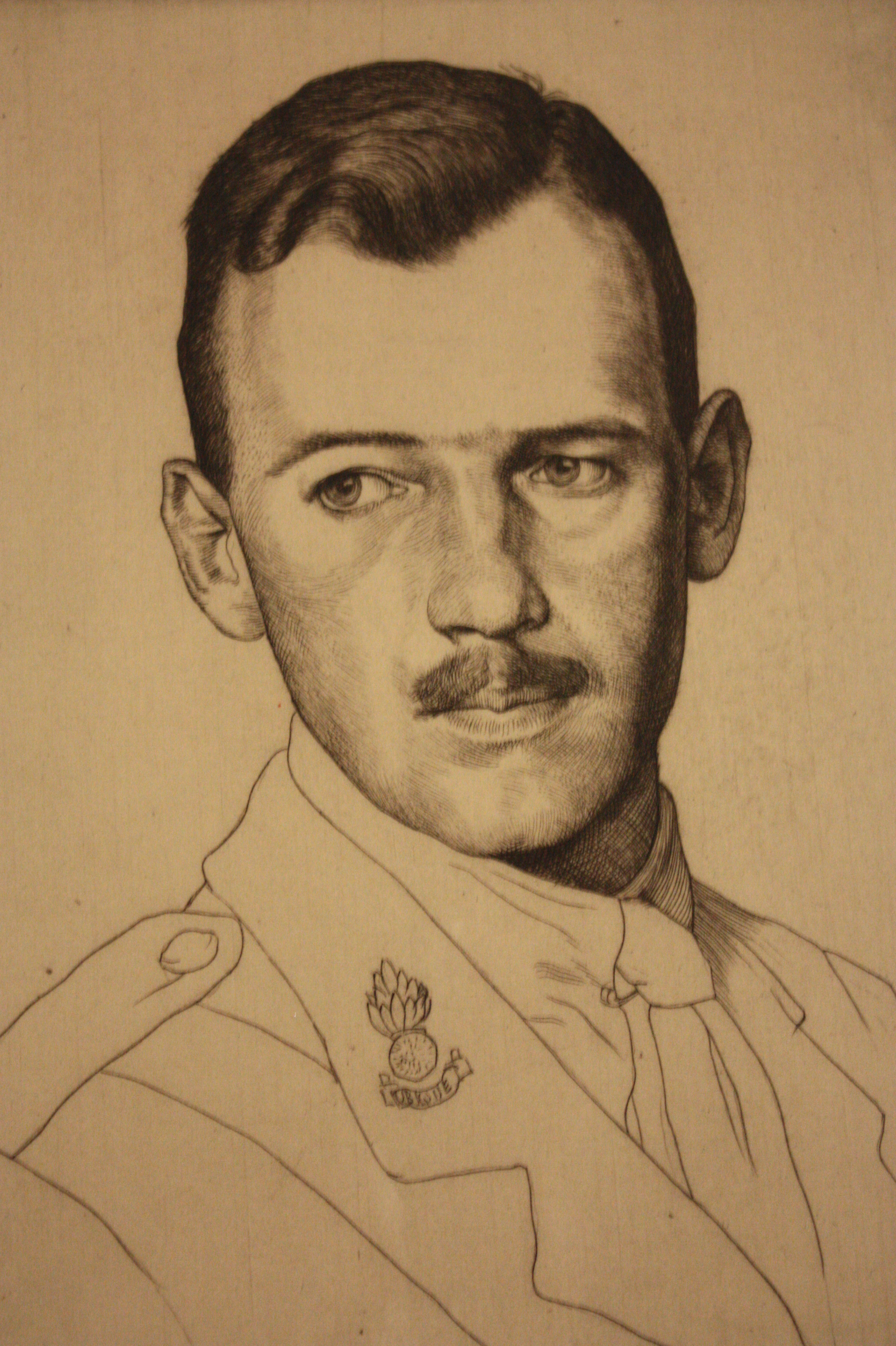
- An etched portrait of David Strang by his father, William Strang
- Born: 14 July 1887; Dumbarton
- Died: 9 January 1967 (aged 79); London
- Education: University of Glasgow
- Spouse: Dorothy Bella Labbett
- Children: 2
- Father: William Strang
- Relatives: Ian Strang (brother)

David Strang (14 July 1887 – 9 January 1967) was a British artist and printer, mainly of etchings and drypoints published in limited editions, for many well-known artists in the UK and USA in the 1920s and 1930s.

== Early life ==
David Rogerson Strang was born on 14 July 1887 in Dumbarton, Scotland to William and Agnes Strang, born Agnes McSymon Rogerson. His father, William Strang RA, was an eminent artist and his elder brother, Ian Strang RE, was a draughtsman and etcher. He had two other brothers, Peter Denny Strang and Roy Burch Strang, and a sister, Agnes Nancy McSymon Strang.

David Strang studied at the University of Glasgow. During World War I he served as a second lieutenant in the Royal Engineers.

== Work ==
David Strang's skills as a printer of designs by artists etched or engraved onto zinc or copper plates were in great demand at the end of the etching revival in the 1920s. He printed the plates of etchers such as Edmund Blampied, John Taylor Arms, Robert Austin, Orovida Camille Pissarro and Frederick Clifford Dixon, examples of which are in the British Museum, many of which he donated. He often used laid printing paper with his own watermark, ‘DAVID STRANG’.

David Strang printed much of his father's intaglio work and presented over 1,300 items by William Strang to Glasgow Museums between 1955 and 1962. Strang printed the works of some other artists, among them George Adamson, Geoffrey Wedgwood and Wilfred Fairclough. Wedgwood called David Strang ‘the greatest printer who ever was’.

== Personal life ==
In April 1918, at the age of 30, Strang married 20-year old Dorothy Bella Labbett at Marylebone in London. Dorothy gave birth to twins in April 1919: a boy named Jean who died, and a girl named Joan who survived. Strang was opposed to Dorothy appearing as a soprano on stage at the London Palladium, which she did under the name Dora Labbette, so she left him in 1920. He was granted a decree for the restitution of conjugal rights in 1921 and Dorothy filed for divorce in 1928. After her separation from Strang, Dorothy had an affair for 13 years with Sir Thomas Beecham, with whom she had a son in March 1933, named Paul Strang.

David Strang died on 9 January 1967 in London, at the age of 79.

== Publications ==
- Strang, David (1930). The Printing of Etchings and Engravings. London: Ernest Benn.
