= Frederick Dixon =

Frederick Dixon may refer to:

- Frederick Whittaker Dixon (1854–1935), architect from Oldham, England
- Frederick Clifford Dixon (1902–1992), creator of etchings depicting urban life in London
- Fred Dixon (politician) (Frederick John Dixon, 1881–1931), Manitoba politician
- Freddie Dixon (Frederick William Dixon, 1892–1956), English motorcycle racer and racing car driver

== See also ==
- Fred Dixon (disambiguation)
