= Job Nixon =

English painter and engraver

- Born: 20 February 1891; Stoke-on-Trent
- Died: 26 July 1938 (aged 47); Mendham
- Alma mater: Royal College of Art; Slade School of Fine Art
- Occupation: Painter, engraver, etcher, watercolorist
- Style: landscape painting, figurative art

Job Nixon (1891–1938) was an English painter and engraver.

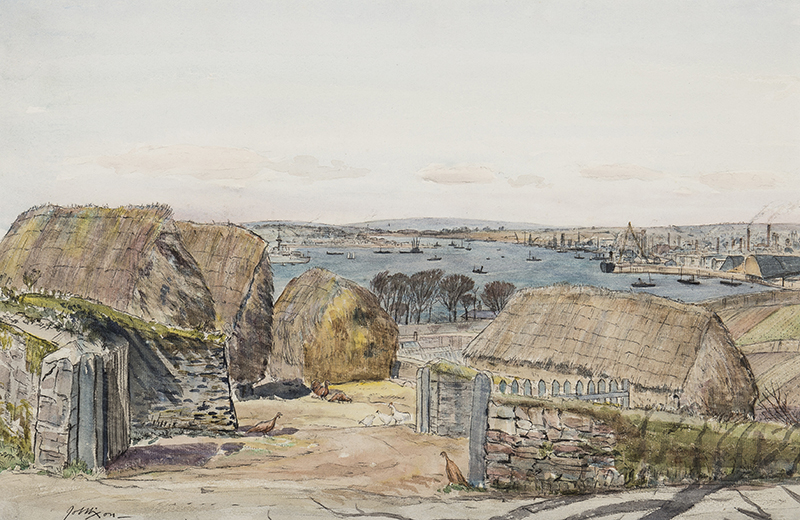
Home Farm – near Plymouth (circa 1930, chalk, ink and watercolour)

He was born in 1891 in The Potteries, in Staffordshire.

When he was eighteen, he won a scholarship to the Royal College of Art. He later studied at the Slade School of Fine Art, and then another scholarship enabled him to attend the British School of Engraving in Rome.

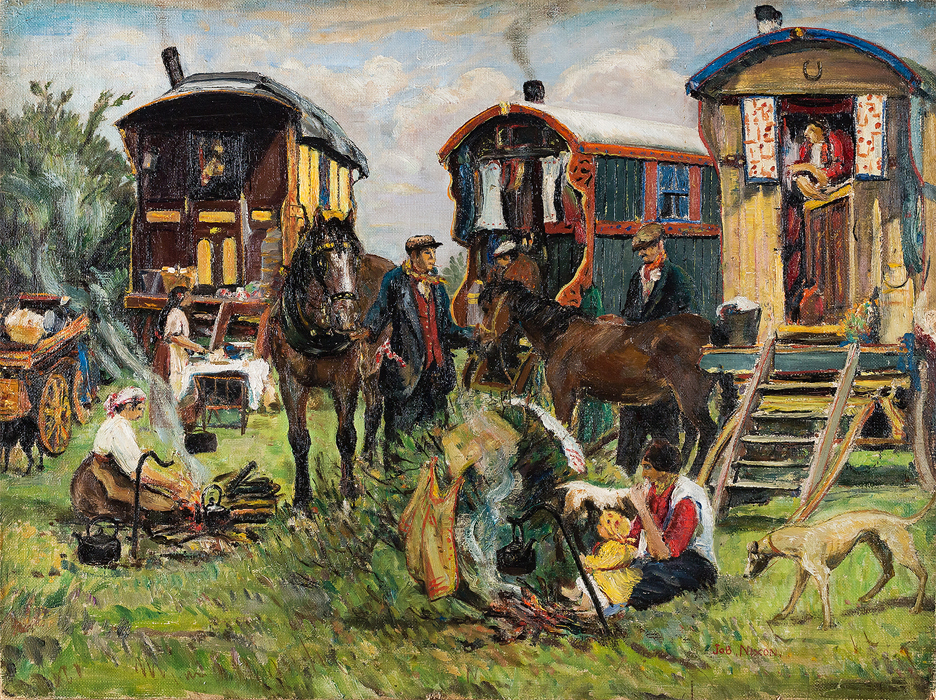
Gypsy Encampment (1939, oil on canvas)

He was known for his etchings and drypoints, producing over 75. Many of these depicted places in France or Italy.

He became an associate of the Royal Watercolour Society in 1928 and a member in 1934.

His paintings are in a number of public collections, including those of Manchester Art Gallery, the Potteries Museum & Art Gallery the Royal Watercolour Society, the Art Institute of Chicago, the Nelson-Atkins Museum of Art, the Auckland Art Gallery, and the National Gallery of Victoria.

He died in 1938.

In a review of a 1972 exhibition by fellow Staffordshire-born engraver Geoffrey Heath Wedgwood, Edward Morris wrote:

Wedgwood was one of the first pupils to be able to study engraving alone for his diploma [at the RCA] and he profited from the vigorous manner of Job Nixon [1891–1938] rather than from the more refined, delicate approach of the Professor, Sir Frank Short.
