= Ernest Leopold Sichel =

English painter

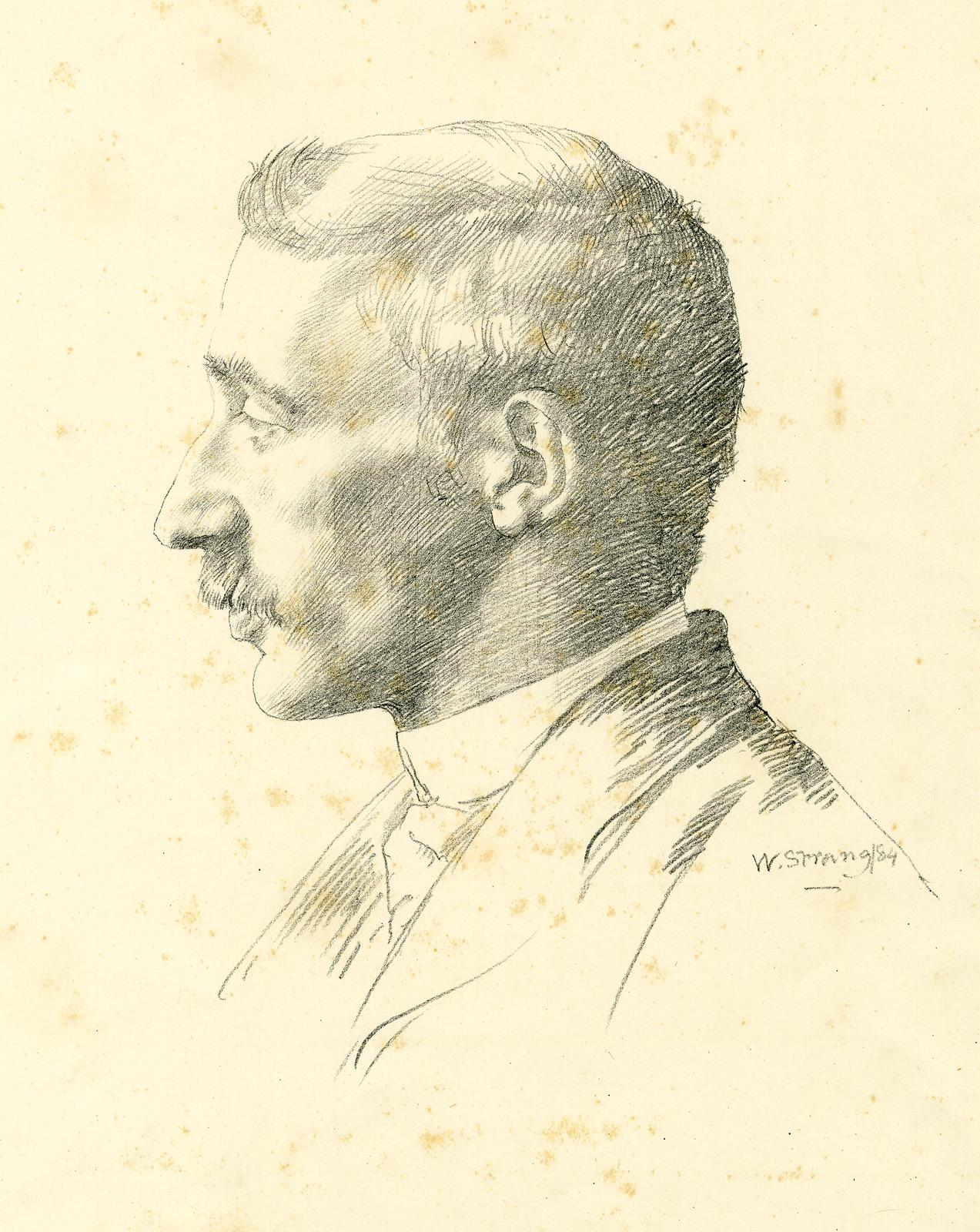
- Ernest Leopold Sichel
- Born: 1862
- Died: 1941 (aged 78–79)
- Occupations: Painter of figures, portraits and still life, a sculptor and silversmith

Ernest Leopold Sichel (1862–1941) was a painter of figures, portraits and still life, a sculptor and silversmith, as well as a pastellist. Sichel was born in Bradford, Yorkshire, England on 27 June 1862 of German Jewish descent, son of a manufacturer from Frankfurt-am-Main.

Sichel was educated at Bradford Grammar School, where he was a contemporary of Frederick Delius. He then studied at Slade School of Art from 1877 to 1879, under the tutelage of Alphonse Legros, and he got know William Strang, with whom he would form a lasting a friendship.

In London, he set up a studio near Euston Square, and while there became friendly with the painter John Macallan Swan; together they visited Paris, where Sichel was influenced by the work of Pierre Puvis de Chavannes.

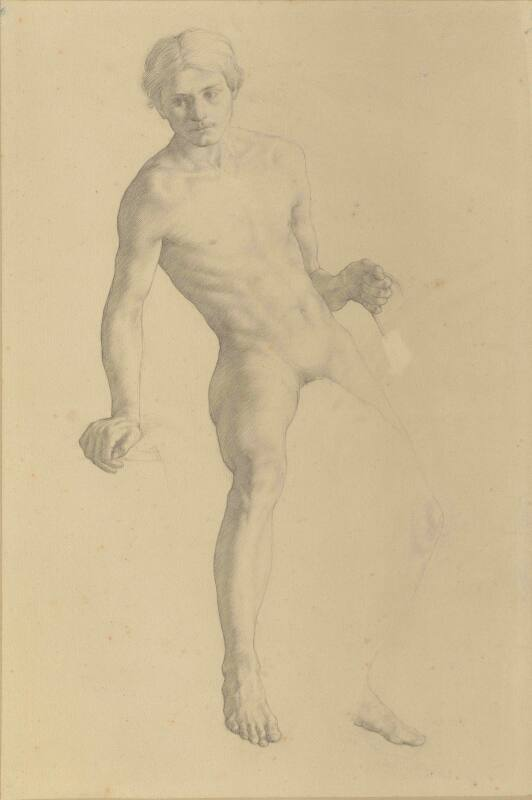
Figure Study - ABDAG003922

He exhibited his work at the Royal Academy from 1885 and at the New English Art Club from 1891. He also exhibited his work at the New Gallery and the Walker Art Gallery in Liverpool.

He returned to Bradford around 1890 and worked for the rest of his life in the city. John Rothenstein, director of the Leeds City Art Gallery, argued that his "unique sense of colour and tone, his tender yet certain grasp of form, [and] the originality and distinction of his outlook ... place Mr Sichel in the foremost rank of living English painters."

In 1933 he undertook a portrait of Lord Mayor of Leeds, Hugh Lupton.

He died on 21 March 1941, and a memorial exhibition of his work was held in Bradford in 1941.
