= Wilfred Fairclough =

- Born: 13 June 1907; Blackburn
- Died: 8 January 1996 (aged 88); Kingston upon Thames
- Known for: Engraving, Drawing
- Spouse: Joan Vernon Cryer
- Awards: 'Prix de Rome' Scholarship in Engraving (1934)
- Elected: ARCA (1933); ARE (1934); RE (1946); RWS (1968)

Wilfred Fairclough (1907 – 1996) was an English artist, engraver and printmaker.

== Early life and education ==
Fairclough was born in Blackburn in 1907 and was educated at All Saints. In 1931 he secured a place at the Royal College of Art, where he studied under Malcolm Osborne and Bob Austin, mastering his craft as a printmaker. He was elected an associate of the Royal Society of Painter-Etchers in January 1934, winning the (British) Prix de Rome Scholarship in Engraving. He was thus able to travel despite the Depression, working in Rome and subsequently in Spain on the eve of the civil war. In the summer of 1936 he married fellow artist, Joan Vernon Cryer. Their son, Michael was born in Blackburn in 1940. Daughter, Celia, was born at the end of the war.

== Career ==
Fairclough started work at Kingston College of Art in 1938. Fairclough's work was exhibited in Poland, Finland and Sweden in 1939. He was called up for war service, joining the RAF. Fairclough was one of the ninety-seven artists that contributed to the Pilgrim Trust funded Recording Britain initiative. His contributions concentrated on buildings in locations near the Thames including Windsor, Henley, Ham and Petersham. In 1942 at RAF Medmenham he worked on models used for the Dambusters' raid on the Möhne Dam. He also served in India for a brief period at the end of the war.

After the war he returned to work at Kingston. Between 1947 and 1950 his work was exhibited in Australia, New Zealand and Fiji. In 1961 he secured a grant from the Leverhulme Foundation and undertook a study tour in Italy, returning to Venice for three weeks and producing numerous sketches that formed the basis for much of his later work. Back at Kingston, he became Principal of the College of Art in 1962, progressing to Assistant Director of the Kingston Polytechnic and was Head of the Division of Design from 1970 until retirement in 1972.

Although teaching and administration took much of his time, he continued to etch throughout his career, producing on average one plate per year. He also painted watercolours, self-taught and inspired by J. M. W. Turner. After retiring from Kingston he produced about four plates per year, producing sixty-nine etchings between 1972 and 1994, almost doubling his pre-retirement output.

In 1990 he released a book of his etchings, The Etchings of Wilfred Fairclough, in conjunction with Ian Lowe.

Wilfred Fairclough died at Kingston upon Thames on 8 January 1996.
