= Fred Dixon =

Fred Dixon may refer to:

- Fred Dixon (politician) (1881–1931), Manitoba politician
- Fred Dixon (athlete) (born 1949), American decathlete

== See also ==
- Frederick Dixon (disambiguation)
