= The Midland Group =

The Midland Group was an organisation that presented new art in Nottingham and the East Midlands between 1943 and 1987.

== History 1943–1987 ==
The Midland Group of Artists was established in Nottingham in 1943 by Evelyn Gibbs. Its first gallery occupied one room, at 38 Bridlesmith Gate. After several moves the group settled at 11 East Circus Street from 1961–1977. Throughout the sixties, it provided 'a forum for progressive and experimental visual arts in Nottingham'. In 1976 the group was re-formed as the Midland Art and Community Centre Ltd, although it continued to be popularly known as the Midland Group. With the aid of a series of Arts Council grants, it re-located to new premises in the Lace Market district of Nottingham, leasing a property at Carlton Street from Nottingham City Council. The move officially took place in 1977, although the new premises only became usable in stages as various parts of the building were renovated and refurbished according to the Group's plans, creating designated spaces for administration, exhibitions, performance and cinema, as well as a roof terrace, bar and shop.

The Midland Group frequently reached out to other regional arts centres around the country. Most prominent among these were Bristol's Arnolfini Gallery and the Ikon in Birmingham. A representative from the Arnolfini served on the general committee of the Midland Group in 1974 and in the same year, in the lead-up to company registration, a committee member had reported that the Ikon's constitution could 'serve as a good model' on which to base that of the Midland Group . In addition, there are records of an official visit conducted by the Director to the Arnolfini (1975) and an 'experimental cultural visit' to Amsterdam with the Ikon (1983).

At Carlton Street, the Midland Group continued to programme a wide range of events and exhibitions. Following its reincorporation as an Art Centre in 1976, a number of sub-committees were created in areas including Craft, Film, Fine Art, Photography and Performance. In the 1980s the Midland Group had a particularly profound effect on the development of Performance and Live Art, Its 'Performance Platform' organised by Steve Rogers, was the starting point for the National Review of Live Art. Also important to its work as an arts centre at this time was the Group's education programme, including outreach work with local schools during the 1970s and 1980s.

When the Midland Group dissolved in 1987, its New Cinema was merged with the Nottingham Film Theatre to become City Lights Cinema. Likely contributing factors to its eventual dissolution in the 1980s were government spending cuts and problematic management regimes. Although they may be a subject of intrigue, the causes of its demise do not relate directly to the work that was carried out by the Group in terms of exhibitions, events and education.

== Legacies ==
The New Midland Group is an artists' led consortium for Nottingham city made up of three independent artist studios Backlit, One Thoresby Street and Primary developing the ongoing legacy of The Midland Group.

The Midland Group Archives (Nottinghamshire County Archive)

The Midland Group's collected paperwork was deposited with Nottinghamshire County Archive in January 1988. The period following company registration (1976-1987) contains the most comprehensive holdings and the earliest extent of the archive is a series of secretarial reports from 1961–1965. The period documented by the Archives records the Group's changing form, from a gallery to an arts centre, with the development of the new Carlton St premises being a key part of that process.

Up until its incorporation as a limited company in 1976, the Midland Group is said to have 'always been organised on a fairly informal basis' . During this time, the key actor was Sylvia Cooper, who, in her role as the Group's first full-time Director from 1963, organised much of the Group's activities including writing to artists, events management, fundraising, curating exhibitions and hiring staff. During this time a general committee did exist, including representatives from the local city and county councils and the UK Arts Council.

After Silvia Cooper's retirement from the Group in 1979, a number of group members were employed as Director or Acting Director. In 1983, funding was devolved from the Arts Council to East Midlands Arts, coinciding with the East Midlands Arts review of the Midland Group . In 1981 it was noted that the Arts Council and East Midlands Arts were 'unhappy with the structure of the Midland Group', a view which indicates the increased involvement of national and regional structures in the direction of the Group at this time.

== Selected exhibitions and events (1961–1986) ==
- 1961 Midland Young Contemporaries
- 1961 Modern Argentine Painting & Sculpture
- 1962 Group Project One – A Demonstration of Visual Sensations
- 1962 New Art from Rhodesia
- 1966 New American Painting & Sculpture (Incl. Roy Lichtenstein, Jackson Pollock, Andy Warhol)
- 1968 Six Latin American Countries: Argentina: Angelica Caporaso, Cesar Cofone, Armando Durante, Lea Lublin, Gabriel Messil, Honorio Morales, Julio Le Parc, Armando Rearte, Emilio Renart, Antonio Segni, Uruburu; Brazil: Dora Basilio, Sergio Camargo, Lygia Clark, Servulo Esmeraldo, Marcelo Grassman, Roberto Delamonica, Helio Oiticica, Rossini Perez, Arthur Luiz Piza; Chile: Nemesio Antunez, Jose Balmes, Ernesto Barreda, Gracia Barrios, Roberto Matta, Guillermo Nunez, Rodolfo Opazo, Dolores Walker, Enrique Zanartu; Mexico: Feliciano Bejar, Jorge Dubon, Raul Herrera, Emilio Ortiz, Felipe Pena, J. Tellosa, Francisco Lopez Toledo, Rodolfo Zanabria; Uruguay: Taller De Montevideo, Torres Garcia; Venezuela: Carlos Cruz-Diez
- 1969 Bridget Riley
- 1969 Ten Dutch Artists (Kees van Bohemen, Bob Bonies, Mark Brusse, Ad Dekkers, Jos Manders, Martin Rons, Jan Schoonhoven, Ray Staakman, Peter Struycken and Carel Visser)
- 1970 The John Player Biennale
- 1970 Visions, Projects and Proposals
- 1970 Experiment
- 1971 Experiment II
- 1971 Five Belgian Artists (Beekman, Van Hecke, Landuyt, Broodthaers, Roquet).
- 1972 Venezuelan Exhibition / Esteban Castillo, Rafael Franceschi, Victor Lucena, Asdrubal Colmenarez, Pedro Taran, Ruben Nunez, Carlos Cruz-Diez, Cesar Andrade, Acindinao Quesada, Esther Ojeda, Armando Perez, Manuel Mérida, Edison Parrs, Mirna Salamanques, Rafael Martinez, Alexis Yanez, Francisco Salazar, Mary Brandt
- 1972 Postal Exhibition
- 1973 Experiment III
- 1973 Fluxshoe
- 1974 Ian Breakwell, 'The Diary and Related Works'
- 1975 Conrad Atkinson, Northern Ireland 1968 – Mayday 1975
- 1976 Sites
- 1976 Stephen Willats, Life Codes and Behaviour Parameters
- 1977 Oliver Kilbourn, My Life as a Pitman
- 1977 Gerhard Richter
- 1977 Ian Breakwell, The Diaries 1968-76
- 1978 Paul Waplington
- 1978 Photography as Fine Art
- 1979 David Hockney
- 1980 Hans Haacke & Sarah McCarthy
- 1982 Sean Scully
- 1982 Helen Chadwick – Activated installation
- 1982 Sense and Sensibility in Feminist Art
- 1982 Feminist Art Group (Pauline Lucas, Margaret Howitt, Shirley Cameron, Evelyn Silver, Sue Sareen, Rachel Finkelstein)
- 1983 Artists International Association
- 1983 British Polaroid Open Exhibition
- 1984 Pandora's Box / Women's Images Collective
- 1984 Rose Garrard
- 1984 Paula Rego
- 1984 Robert Mapplethorpe
- 1985 Jo Spence
- 1985 Participate
- 1985 Eight Days: Anne Bean, Holly Warburton, Hidden Grin, AD/BC, Gaby Agis, Oscar McLennan, Kathy Acker, Ron Geesin (National Review of Live Art)
- 1985 The Miner's World—Miners in Photography and Literature, Edith Tudor-Hart, Edwin Smith, Bruce Davidson, Dennis Thorpe, Jane Bown, John Davies, Raissa Page, John Sturrock, Brenda Price, Ian Berry, Humphrey Spender, David Hurn, John Harris, Bill Brandt. Shown in Nottingham then toured during 1985 and 1986. Funded by Arts Council England.
- 1985 Total Black Art Showcase
- 1985 Victor Burgin, The Bridge
- 1985 Surrealist Traces (including Luis Buñuel, Salvador Dalí, Marcel Duchamp, Man Ray)
- 1986 Caribbean Art Now
- 1986 National Review of Live Art
