= Ian Strang =

English painter

- Born: 11 April 1886; London, England
- Died: 23 March 1952 (aged 65); Wavendon, Buckinghamshire, England
- Education: Slade School of Art; Académie Julian
- Known for: Painting
- Father: William Strang
- Relatives: David Strang (brother)

William Ian Strang, R.E., (11 April 1886 – 23 March 1952) was a British draughtsman and etcher who specialised in topographical subjects.

== Biography ==
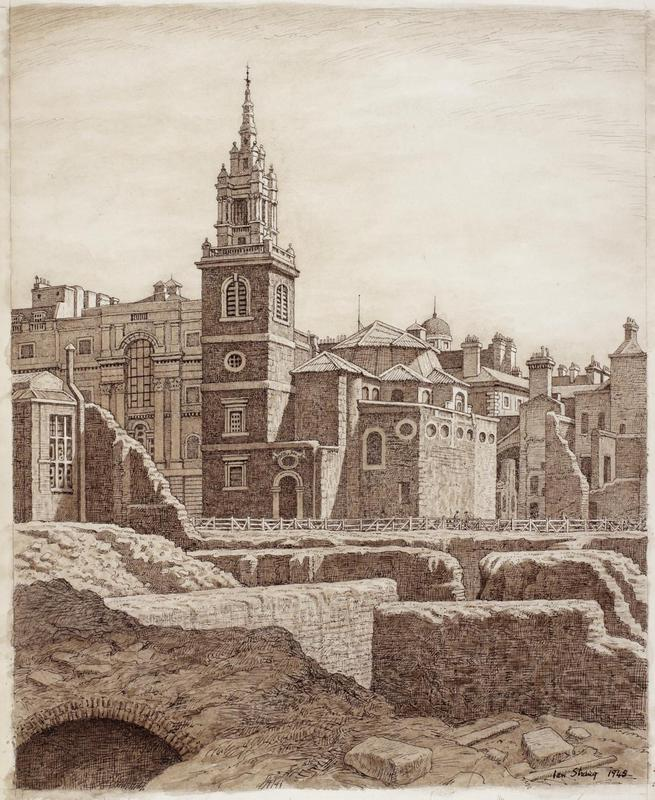
St Stephen's Walbrook, London, EC4 (1945) (Art.IWM ART LD 5306)

Strang was born in London, the eldest son of William Strang, an internationally known etcher, and his wife Alice née Rogerson. He studied at the Slade School of Art from 1902 until 1906 with Henry Tonks and under Jean-Paul Laurens at the Académie Julian in Paris, 1906–8. Strang held his first solo exhibition at the Goupil Gallery in 1914. He served in the Middlesex and Royal Berkshire Regiments (1914–19) during the First World War. Strang also produced some artworks during the War and the British War Memorials Committee purchased one large painting and several drawings of French battlefields from him.

Strang exhibited at the Royal Academy from 1923 and the New English Art Club from 1919. He was an early member of the Society of Graphic Art and exhibited at their first annual exhibition in 1921. Strang was elected an Associate member of the Royal Society of Painter-Etchers and Engravers in 1925 and became a full member in 1930. He also visited and studied in Italy, Belgium, Spain and Sicily. Among his paintings was a notable portrait of James Dickson Innes. In 1944 Strang submitted five drawings of bomb damaged buildings in central London to the War Artists' Advisory Committee, WAAC, and the Committee purchased four of them. WAAC purchased a further two drawings of similar subjects in July 1945 for thirty guineas.

Strang was married to Frances and had a brother, David Strang (1887–1967), who was an artist and printmaker. Ian Strang died at Wavendon, Buckinghamshire, on 23 March 1952. A memorial exhibition was held at the Leicester Galleries in 1952.

== Publications ==
- Town and Country in Southern France. 1937. (with Frances Strang)
- The Student's Book of Etching. 1938.
