= Dora Labbette =

British opera singer

Dora Labbette, 1926 publicity photograph

Dora Labbette (4 March 1898 – 3 September 1984) was an English soprano. Her career spanned the concert hall and the opera house. She conspired with Sir Thomas Beecham to appear at the Royal Opera House masquerading as an Italian singer by the name of Lisa Perli. Away from professional concerns she had an affair with Beecham, with whom she had a son.

== Biography ==
Labbette was born Dorothy Bella Labbett in the London suburb of Purley, the daughter of a railway porter. She studied at the Guildhall School of Music, where she won the Melba scholarship, the Knill challenge cup for the best student of the year, and the Heilbut scholarship. She also studied with Liza Lehmann, who took her to sing to the music publisher and impresario William Boosey, who gave her a contract to sing songs published by his company, at "Ballad concerts, Promenades and Sunday evening concerts". She made her Wigmore Hall début in 1917, and in April 1918 married a soldier, Captain David Rogerson Strang of the Royal Engineers, son of the painter William Strang. The couple had one child, Joan Strang, born 18 April 1919, but Strang wanted his wife to abandon her musical career; she refused and left him after nineteen months of marriage to continue singing. She had a long recital and oratorio career in which she appeared in London and in the provinces. She was the soprano soloist at the first performance of Delius's Idyll in 1933.

She made her operatic debut under her own name in Oxford in 1934, in Rameau's Castor et Pollux, which was followed in March 1935 by Gounod's Romeo and Juliet with Heddle Nash for the London and Provincial Opera Society, with John Barbirolli conducting. She then, with Beecham and the agent Harold Holt, participated in a "brilliant publicity stunt". Beecham, publicising Covent Garden's autumn 1935 season, announced that it would include "the first appearance in this country of an outstanding Italian soprano, Lisa Perli", singing the role of Mimì in La bohème. Beecham forbade interviews with her and made a great mystery of the whole affair. Before very long, though, it was an open secret amongst musical London and the press that the newly discovered singer was in fact Labbette, wearing a blonde wig and using the mock-Italian name "Lisa Perli", after her birthplace, Purley. The general public was not long deceived by the pseudonym either - reporting on her 28 September 1935 stage premiere as Mimì, the Daily Telegraph and the Daily Mail both disclosed the real identity of "Lisa Perli" - and she was rapidly accepted as an opera singer. When the hoax was revealed, The Gramophone published a short verse which included the lines:

Dora Labbette! Dora Labbette, O!
We rather like our pocket prima donna,
Who sings as well as any twenty-tonner.
Will Perli last? Will she become a habit,
Or dwindle back into Miss Dora Labbette?

In a later interview, Labbette explained that she had found it impossible to break out of the concert and oratorio repertoire into opera. "As for the Messiah, the Creation and Elijah, I must have sung the leading soprano parts in these oratorios hundreds of times, until I felt I would shriek if I were asked to do them again.... But it seemed quite hopeless and against all tradition that a singer who had been identified with the concert platform should desire to appear on the operatic stage." The critic Neville Cardus wrote of her, "Lisa Perli is the best of our Mimis. She has a genius for diminutive pathos and in the closing scene she can bring moistness to the throat of the hardened critic."

After this operatic success, she went to Paris and studied Debussy's Pelléas and Mélisande, subsequently singing Melisande at Vichy and Bordeaux and at Covent Garden the following summer. In the autumn of 1937 she sang Mimì in La Bohème at Berlin, Munich and Dresden. After the first performance in Berlin, she was engaged to sing Mignon in German. Her other operatic roles included Desdemona in Otello, Juliette in Roméo et Juliette, and Marguerite in Faust.

The New Grove Dictionary of Opera said of her: "Her voice was true, pure and youthful, and she was an outstanding actress." Labbette made many gramophone records, including the first complete Messiah, conducted by Sir Thomas Beecham, with whom she had an affair lasting thirteen years, which produced a son, Paul.

World War II cut short her London career, and her last operatic performances were on tour with the Carl Rosa Opera Company. Among her last concert performances was in The Creation, with Beecham, in Sydney in 1940.
