= Geoffrey Heath Wedgwood =

British etcher

- Born: 6 April 1900; Leek, Staffordshire, England
- Died: June 1977; Knowsley, England
- Known for: Engraving, drawing
- Awards: Rome Scholarship in Engraving, British School at Rome (1925)
- Elected: ARCA; ARE (1925); RE (1934)

Geoffrey Heath Wedgwood, ARCA, RE (6 April 1900 – June 1977) was a British etcher and engraver, best known for his architectural etchings.

== Early life and education ==
Born in Leek, Staffordshire, the son of Jane and Frank Wedgwood, an engineer, but brought up in Liverpool, Wedgwood attended the Liverpool Institute and then served with the British Army in the First World War. From 1919 to 1921 he studied at the Liverpool City School of Art Winning a scholarship to the Royal College of Art, London, he studied engraving there under Sir Frank Short and from 1924 under his successor Malcolm Osborne.

He was a Rome scholar at the British School at Rome, having won the Engraving Prize in 1925, the same year that Edward Irvine Halliday (1902–1984), a fellow Liverpudlian and also a former student at the RCA, won the Painting Prize. According to Edward Morris, writing in the Connoisseur, Wedgwood "reverted to architectural subjects; his line became harder and more precise; his effects clearer and sharper; less of his work was etched, more engraved; some of the credit for these effects must go to the printer, David Strang".

"In Wedgwood's architectural etchings", wrote Guichard, "the severity of the formal harmonies of square and rectangle in the roofs and walls of old buildings is relieved by gentle caricature in the small local figures that inhabit the scenes and are sympathetically observed."

== Career ==
He later taught at the Liverpool Institute from 1932 to 1935 and at the Liverpool City School of Art from 1935 until his retirement in 1960.

He also worked as an illustrator. His etchings for menus were shown at the L.N.E.R. exhibition of poster art at Burlington Galleries in 1933. Among various projects for Martins Bank advertising in the early 1950s, he was commissioned together with J. C. Armitage (Ionicus) and F. G. Lodge, to do drawings of English stately homes.

== Published works ==
Not complete

- Roberts, Gruffydd Dewi (1935), The House that was forgotten, illus. by Geoffrey Wedgwood. London: Lovat Dickson & Thompson Limited OCLC 972865896
- Roberts, Gruffydd Dewi (1937), Heron's Island, illus. by Geoffrey Wedgwood. London: Dent OCLC 810831172

== Awards and honours ==
- Winner of the Engraving Prize (1925) to be a scholar at the British School at Rome with two works: Negro Dentist and St Pancras Washhouse
- Elected an associate of the Royal Society of Painter-Etchers and Engravers in 1925 and a fellow in 1934.
- Elected associate member of the Royal Cambrian Academy in 1942 and a full member in 1943. Wedgwood resigned his membership in 1958.

== Exhibitions ==
- Junior Workers' Guild exhibition, Mansard Gallery, London, 1925
- Art Institute of Chicago: "International Exhibition of Contemporary Prints: A Century of Progress" 1 June to 1 November 1934: Outside the Walls engraving by Geoffrey Wedgwood exhibited (no. 136)
- Bluecoat Chambers, School Lane, Liverpool, 1932: "Prints and Drawings by Geoffrey Heath Wedgwood"
- Sandon Music Room, Bluecoat Chambers, School Lane, Liverpool, 1944: "Pictures by Four Artists: N. Martin Bell; Edgar Grosvenor; Charles W. Sharpe; Geoffrey H. Wedgwood"
- Bluecoat Chambers, School Lane, Liverpool, 1946: "Exhibition of Paintings, Drawings and Prints by Martin Bell, Edgar Grosvenor, Charles W. Sharpe, William L. Stevenson and Geoffrey Heath Wedgwood"
- Contemporary British Prints and Drawings from the Wakefield Collection British Council touring exhibition, 1947–1950. An exhibition of prints and drawings from the Wakefield Collection selected by James Laver
- Royal Academy (for example The Borghese Gardens, Rome, exhibited in the summer of 1929)
- New English Art Club
- Fine Art Society, New Bond Street, London
- Walker Art Gallery, Liverpool: "Geoffrey Heath Wedgwood", 2 February – 4 March 1972

== Works in public collections ==
- Art Institute of Chicago, Chicago: Old Aldgate, n.d.
- British Museum, London: Porta Capriana, Naples, 1931 (image not shown online)
- British Council Collection: St Peter's, Genoa, line engraving, 1927, accession no. P2479
- Davison Art Center, Wesleyan University, Middletown, CT: Old Aldgate , drypoint, 1924, accession no. 1937.D1.41
- Mildred Lane Kemper Art Museum, Washington University in St. Louis: S.S. Giovanni e Paolo, Rome, 1926, accession no. WU 3719
- Legion of Honor, Fine Arts Museums of San Francisco: Works by Geoffrey Heath Wedgwood
- Minneapolis Institute of Art, Minneapolis: Pincian Gardens, Rome, 1930
- Museum of Fine Arts, Houston: Borghese Gardens, Rome, 1928, and The Fishmarket, Naples, 1929 (both etching and drypoint)
- National Gallery of Victoria, Melbourne: The fishmarket, Naples, 1929, drypoint; Street scene, 1931, drypoint;
- University Art Gallery, Pittsburgh: The Capitol, Rome, accession no. 72.1.16
- University of Liverpool: several items
- Victoria and Albert Museum: St Peter's, Genoa, accession no. E.859-1959
