= William Strang =

Scottish artist and printmaker (1859–1921)

William Strang RA
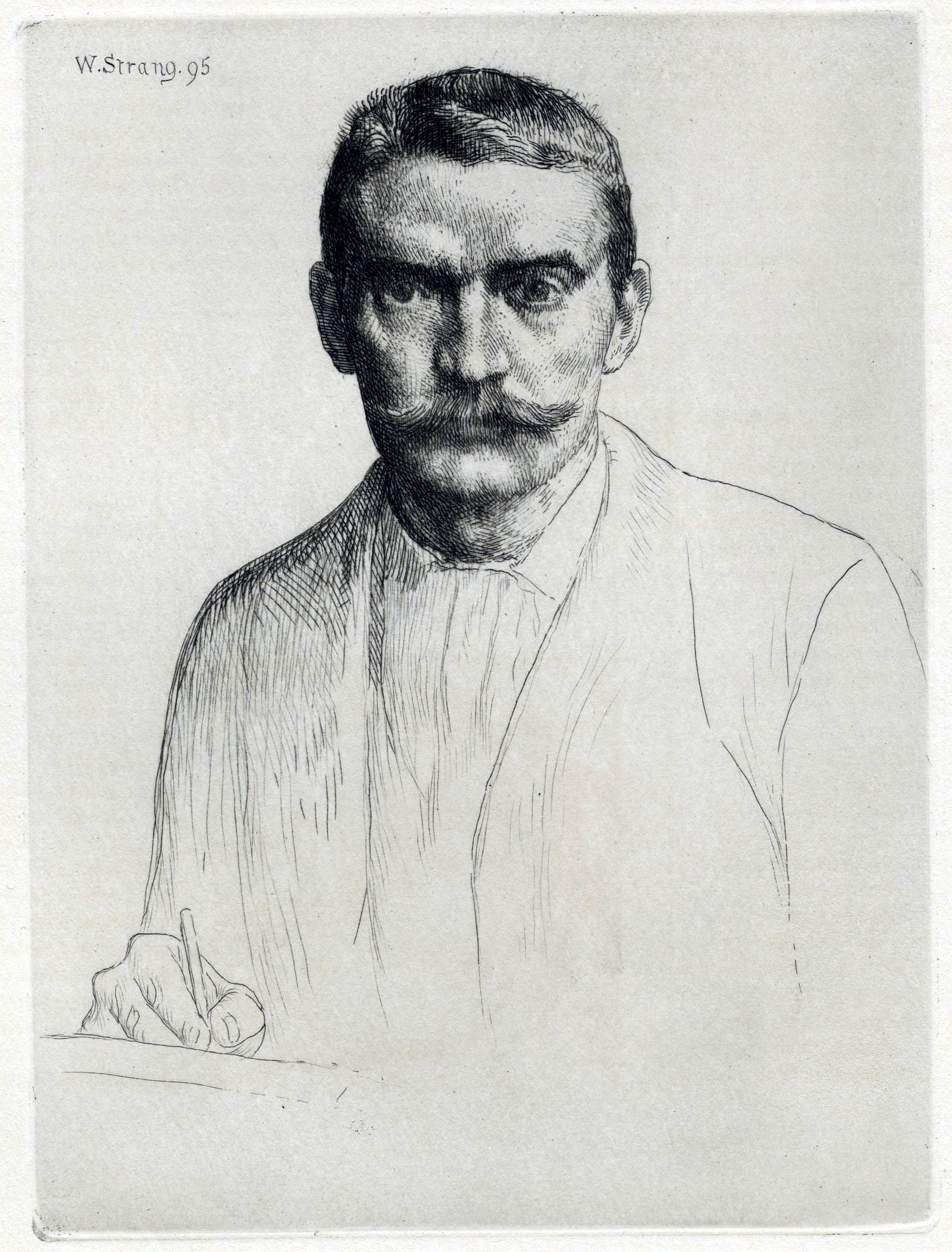
- Born: 15 February 1859; Dumbarton, Dunbartonshire, Scotland
- Died: 12 April 1921 (aged 62); Bournemouth
- Education: Alphonse Legros
- Alma mater: Slade School
- Spouse: Agnes McSymon Rogerson
- Children: Ian Strang, David Strang
- Elected: Master of the Art Workers' Guild, President of the International Society of Sculptors, Painters and Gravers, Engraver Member of the Royal Academy.

William Strang RA (13 February 1859 – 12 April 1921) was a Scottish painter and printmaker, notable for illustrating the works of Bunyan, Cervantes, Coleridge, Kipling, and others.

== Early life ==
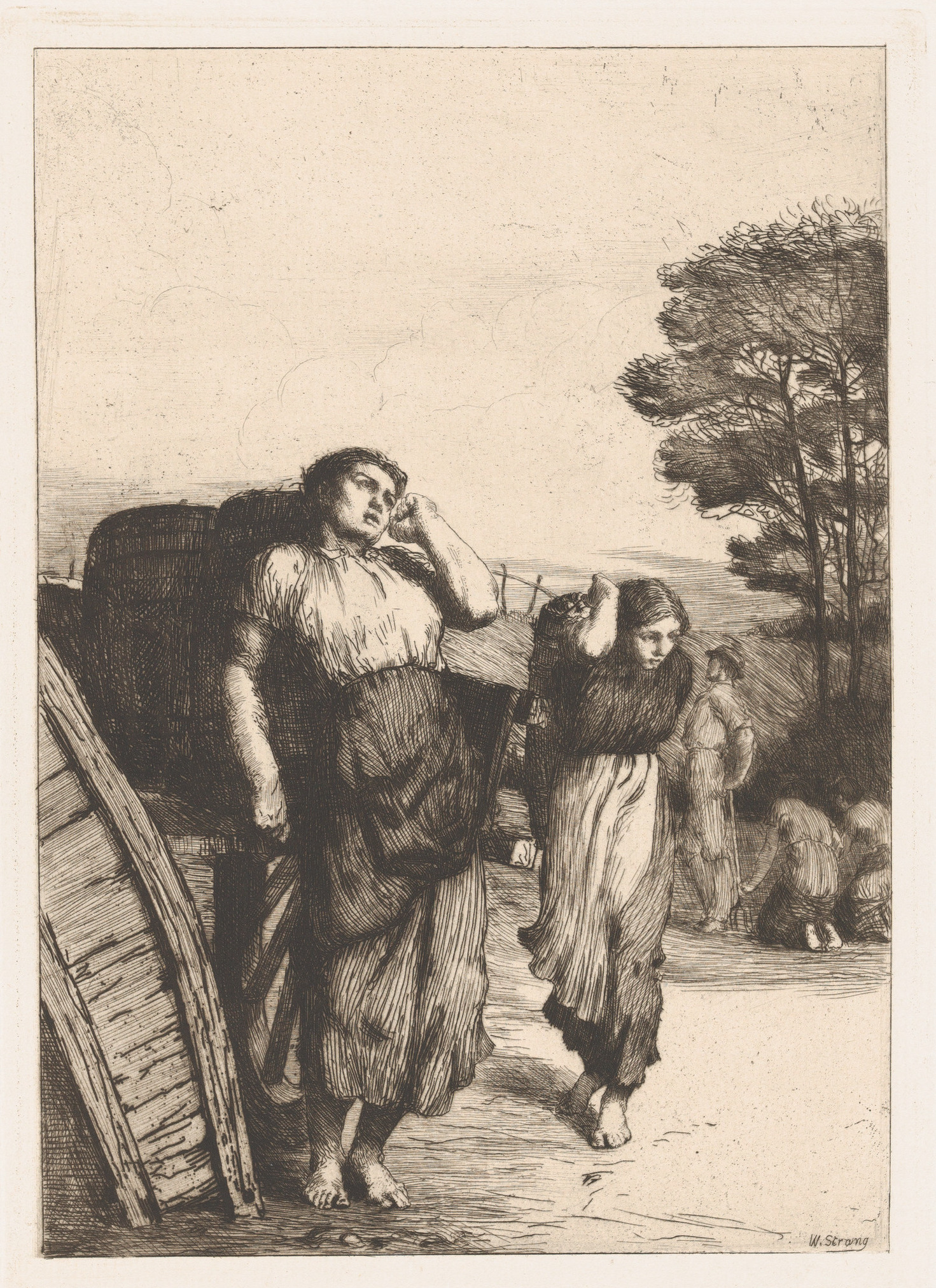
Potato Lifting, etching, 1892

Strang was born at Dumbarton, the son of Peter Strang, a builder, and was educated at the Dumbarton Academy. For fifteen months after leaving school he worked in the counting-house of a firm of shipbuilders, then in 1875, when he was sixteen, went to London. There, he was a pupil of Edward Poynter for three months, before studying drawing and etching under Alphonse Legros at the Slade School of Fine Art for six years. Strang had great success as an etcher and became assistant master in the etching class. He was one of the founding members of the Royal Society of Painter-Etchers, and his work was part of its first exhibition in 1881. Some of his early plates were published in The Portfolio and other art magazines.

== Work ==
He worked in many techniques: etching, drypoint, mezzotint, sand-ground mezzotint, burin engraving, lithography and woodcut. He cut a large wood engraving of a man ploughing, later published by the Art for Schools Association. A privately produced catalogue of his engraved work contained more than three hundred items. Amongst his earlier works were Tinkers, St. Jerome, A Woman Washing Her Feet, An Old Book-stall with a Man Lighting His Pipe from a Flare, and The Head of a Peasant Woman on sand-ground mezzotint. Later plates such as Hunger, The Bachelor's End and The Salvation Army were also important.

Some of his best etchings were done as series—one of the earliest, illustrating poet William Nicholson's Ballad of Aken Drum, is remarkable for clear, delicate workmanship in the shadow tones, showing great skill and power over his materials, and for strong drawing. Another praised series was The Pilgrim's Progress, revealing austere sympathy with John Bunyan's teaching. Samuel Taylor Coleridge's Ancient Mariner and Strang's own Allegory of Death and The Plowman's Wife, have served him with suitable imaginative subjects. Some of Rudyard Kipling's stories were also illustrated by him, and his likeness of Kipling was one of his most successful portrait plates. Other etched portraits included those of Ernest Sichel and of his friend Joseph Benwell Clark, with whom Strang collaborated in illustrating Lucian's True History (1894) Baron Munchausen (1895) and Sinbad the Sailor and Ali Baba (1896).

Thomas Hardy, Sir Henry Newbolt, and other distinguished men also sat for Strang. Proofs from these plates have been much valued.

In 1913, Strang visited Spain with his friend the photographer James Craig Annan, both producing landscape work.

== Painting ==
Strang produced many paintings, portraits, nude figures in landscapes, and groups of peasant families, which were exhibited at the Royal Academy, The International Society, and several German exhibitions. He painted a decorative series of scenes from the story of Adam and Eve for the library of a Wolverhampton landowner named Hodson; they were exhibited at the Whitechapel exhibition in 1910. He made some drawings of the nude figure in silver point and red and black chalk.

He also painted landscapes, mostly small in size. In later years he developed a style of drawing in red and black chalk, with the whites and high lights rubbed out, on paper brushed with wash. His method gives qualities of delicate modelling and refined form and gradations akin to the drawings of Hans Holbein the Younger. He drew portraits in this manner of many members of the Order of Merit for the royal library at Windsor Castle. In 1902 Strang retired from the Royal Society of Painter-Etchers, as a protest against the inclusion in its exhibitions of etched or engraved reproductions of pictures. His work was subsequently seen principally in the exhibitions of the Royal Academy, the Society of Twelve and the International Society, to which he was elected in 1905. Strang was also elected an associate engraver of the Royal Academy when that degree was revived in 1906. William Strang was master of the Art Workers' Guild in 1907, where his portrait can be seen. He died suddenly of heart failure on 12 April 1921 in Bournemouth, England and is buried at Kensal Green Cemetery, London.

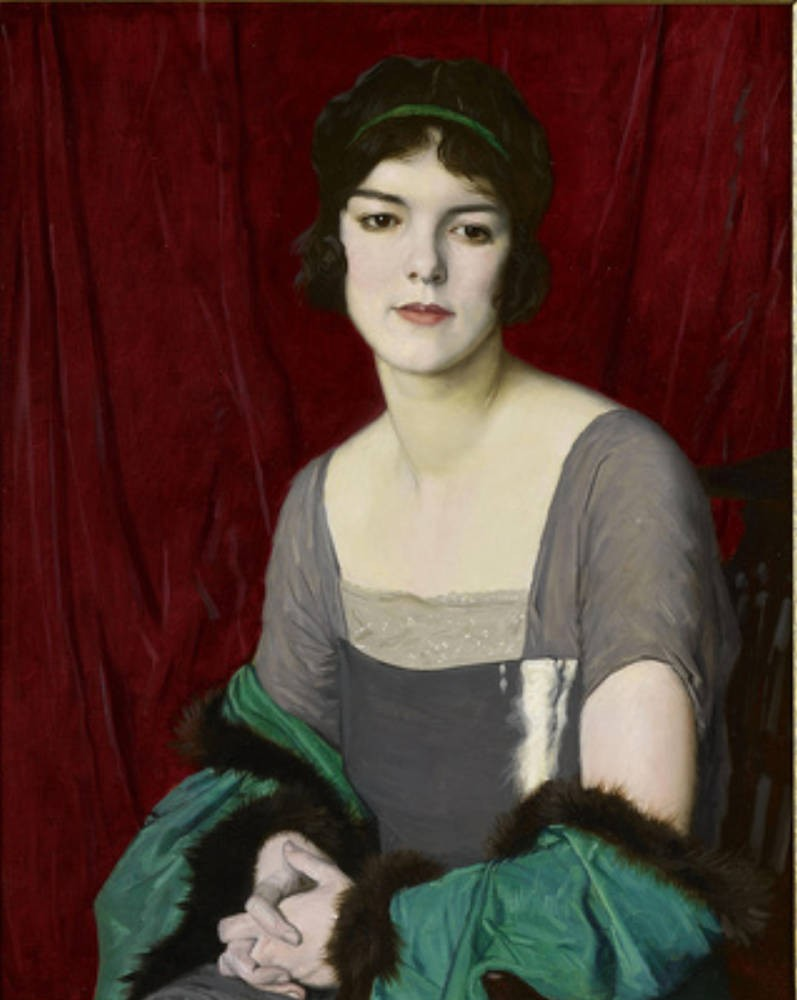
The Green Cloak (Barbara Horder) (1918)

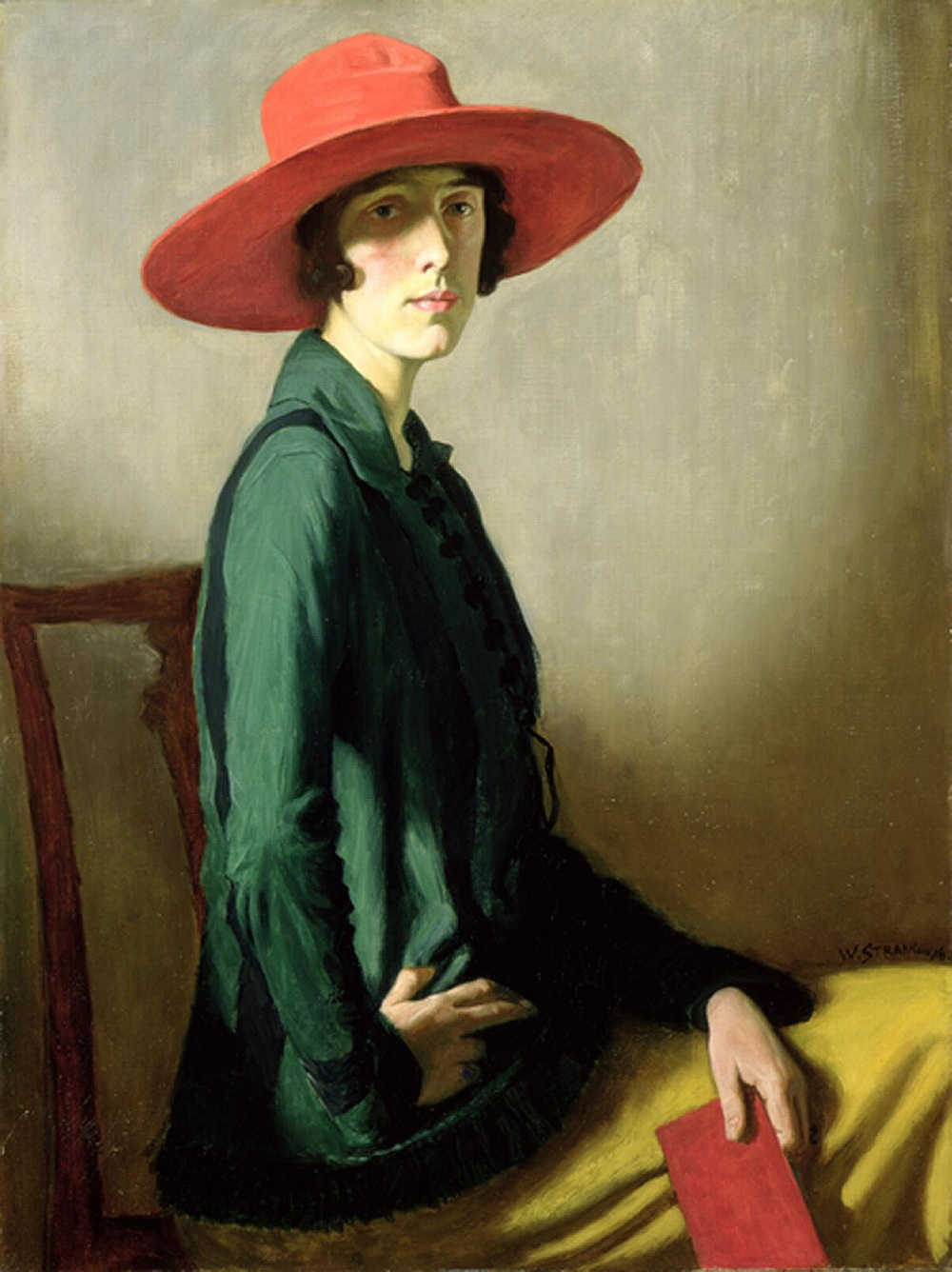
Lady with a Red Hat (Vita Sackville-West) (1918; Kelvingrove Museum and Art Gallery, Glasgow)

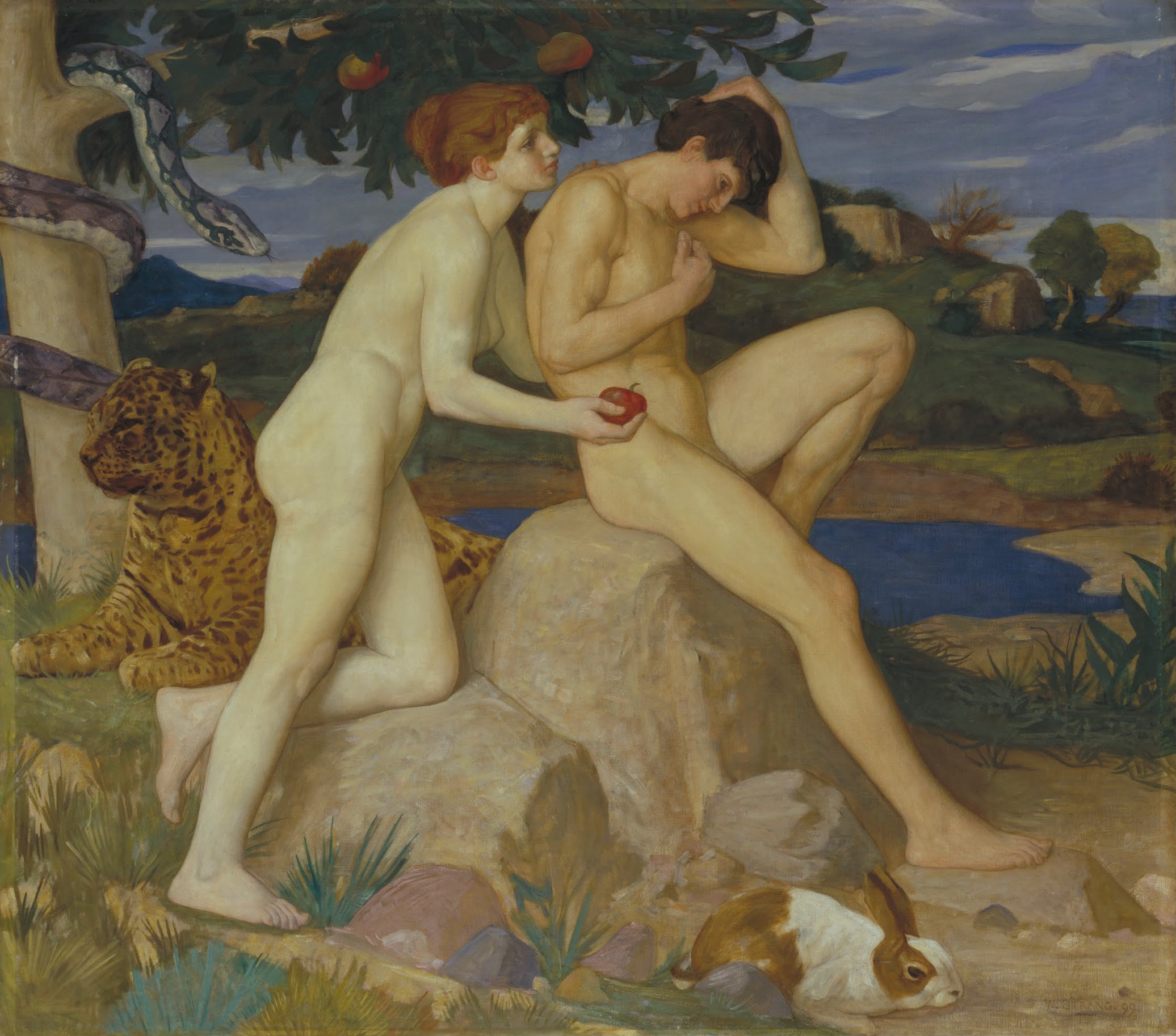
The Temptation (1899; Tate Gallery)

== Literary works ==
Strang also ventured into literature, creating "The Earth Fiend: a Ballad Made and Etched by William Strang" (London: Elkin Mathews, 1892) and "Death and the Ploughman's Wife", another illustrated ballad published in 1894 by Lawrence and Bullen. He also wrote short stories which did not go for publication.

== Recognition ==
Strang was a member of the Art Workers' Guild, being elected as Master in 1907. In 1918, he became President of the International Society of Sculptors, Painters and Gravers and in 1921 was elected an Engraver Member of the Royal Academy, having been elected an associated engraver in 1906.

== Family ==
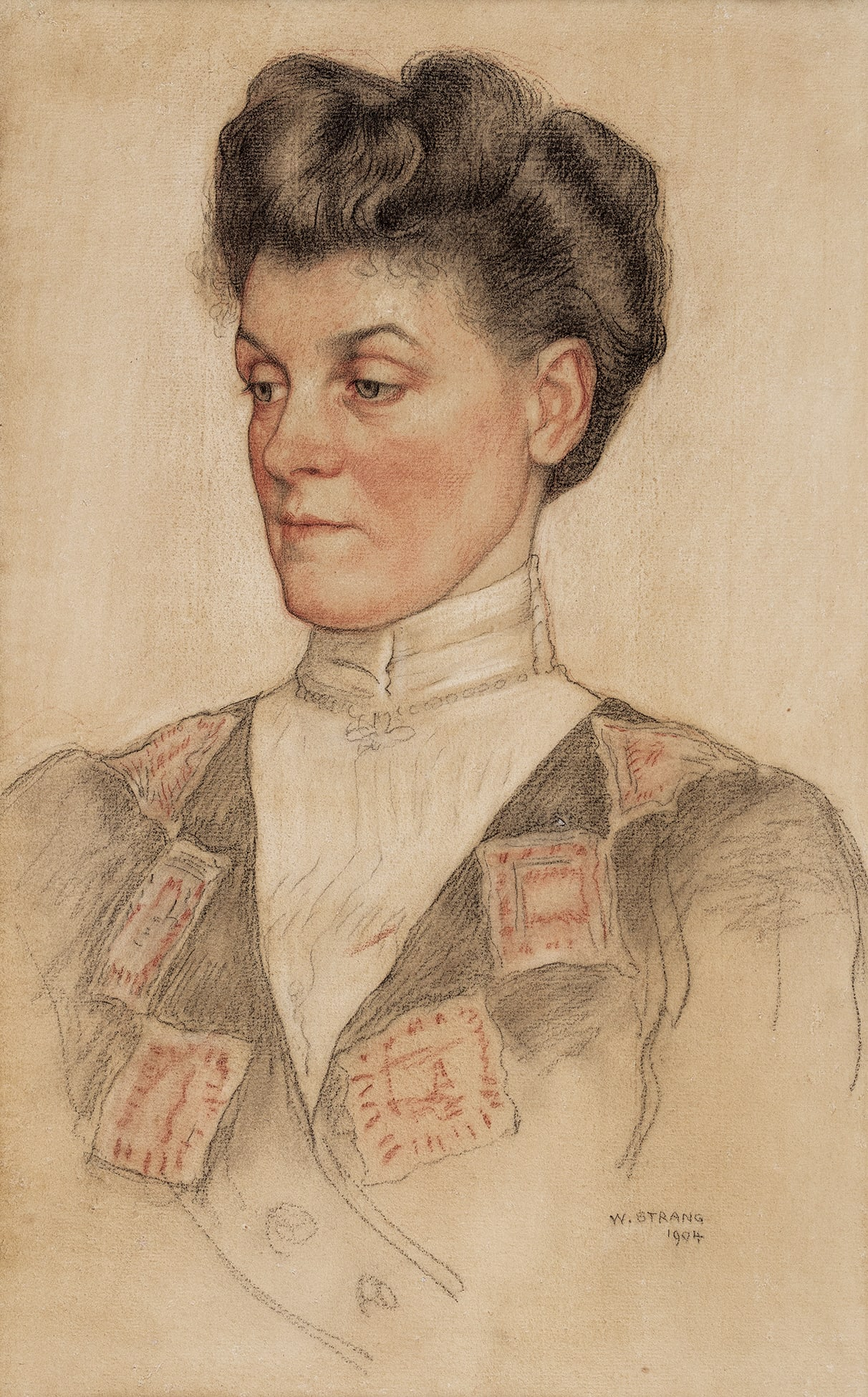
The Artist's Wife, Agnes Strang, 1904

In 1885, William Strang married Agnes McSymon Rogerson (d. 1933), also from Dumbarton. They had four sons and one daughter, Nancy. Their sons Ian Strang (1886–1952) and David Strang (1887–1967) were both artists. William had at least one granddaughter, Joan Strang, born of David's short-lived marriage to the English soprano Dora Labbette.

In 1955 David Strang gave impressions of the bulk of William Strang's etchings to the National Gallery of Scotland, many of which he had annotated for clarification of the subject matter.

== Etchings ==
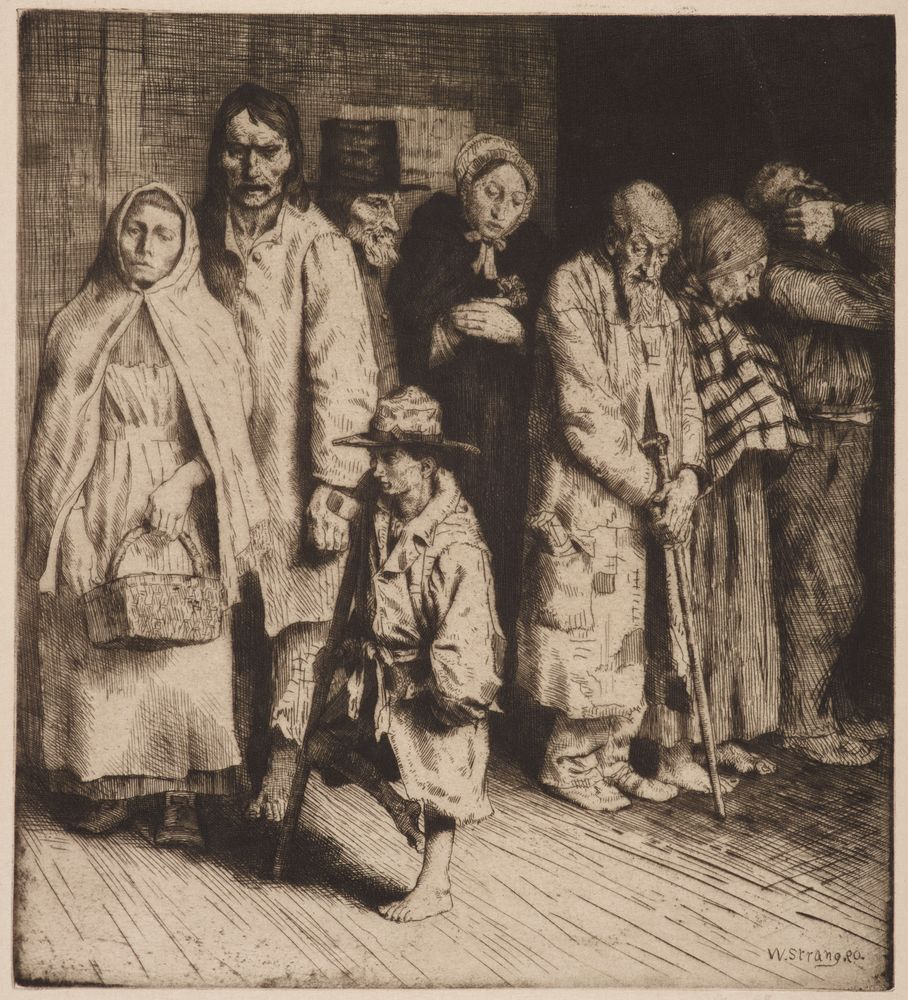
The Cause of the Poor, 1890

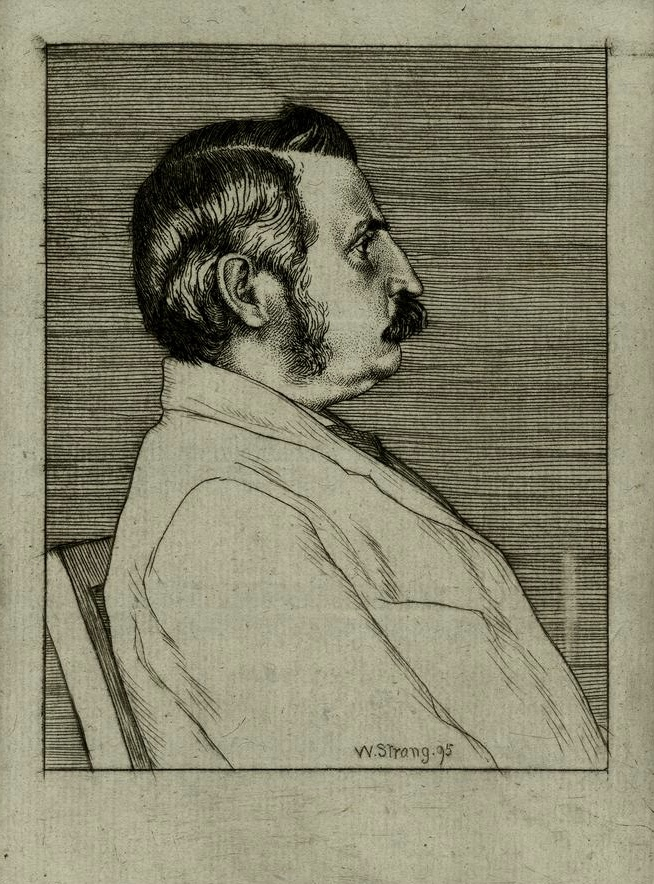
Henry Austin Dobson, 1895

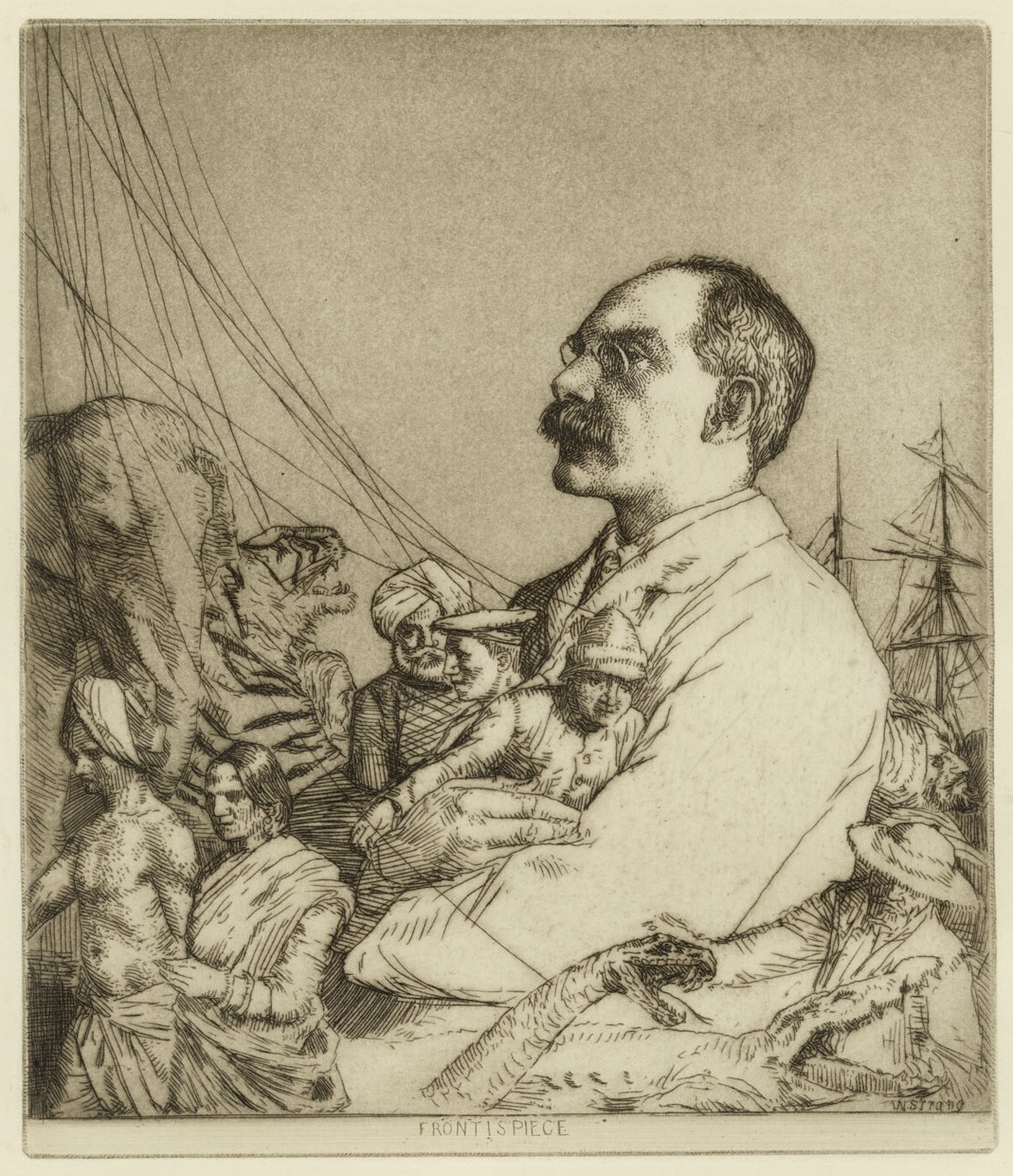
Rudyard Kipling, 1901

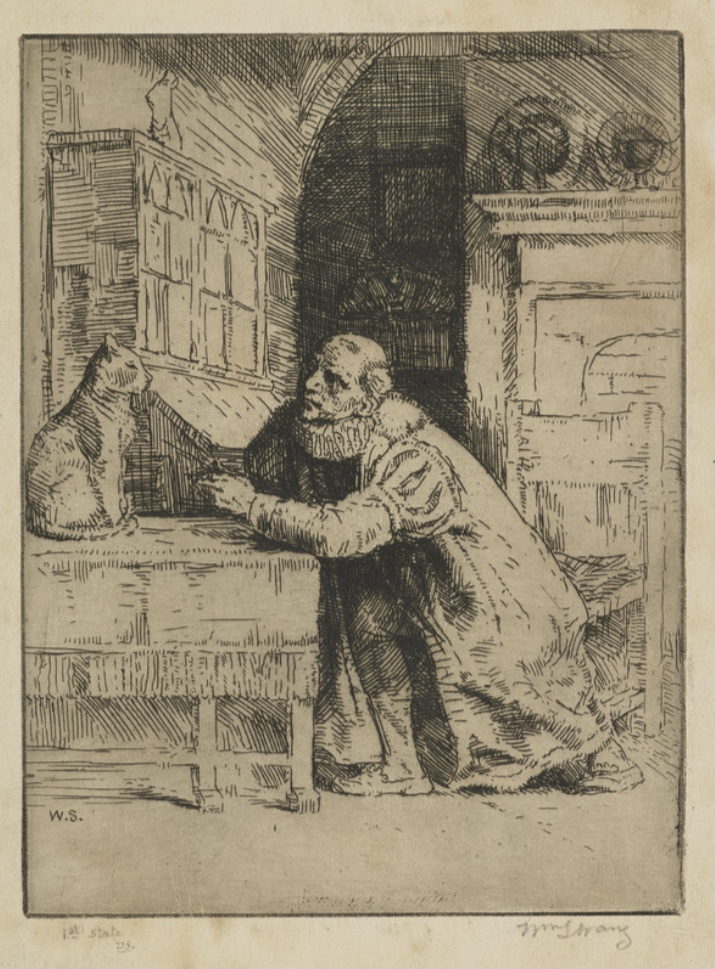
Montaigne and his cat, 1902

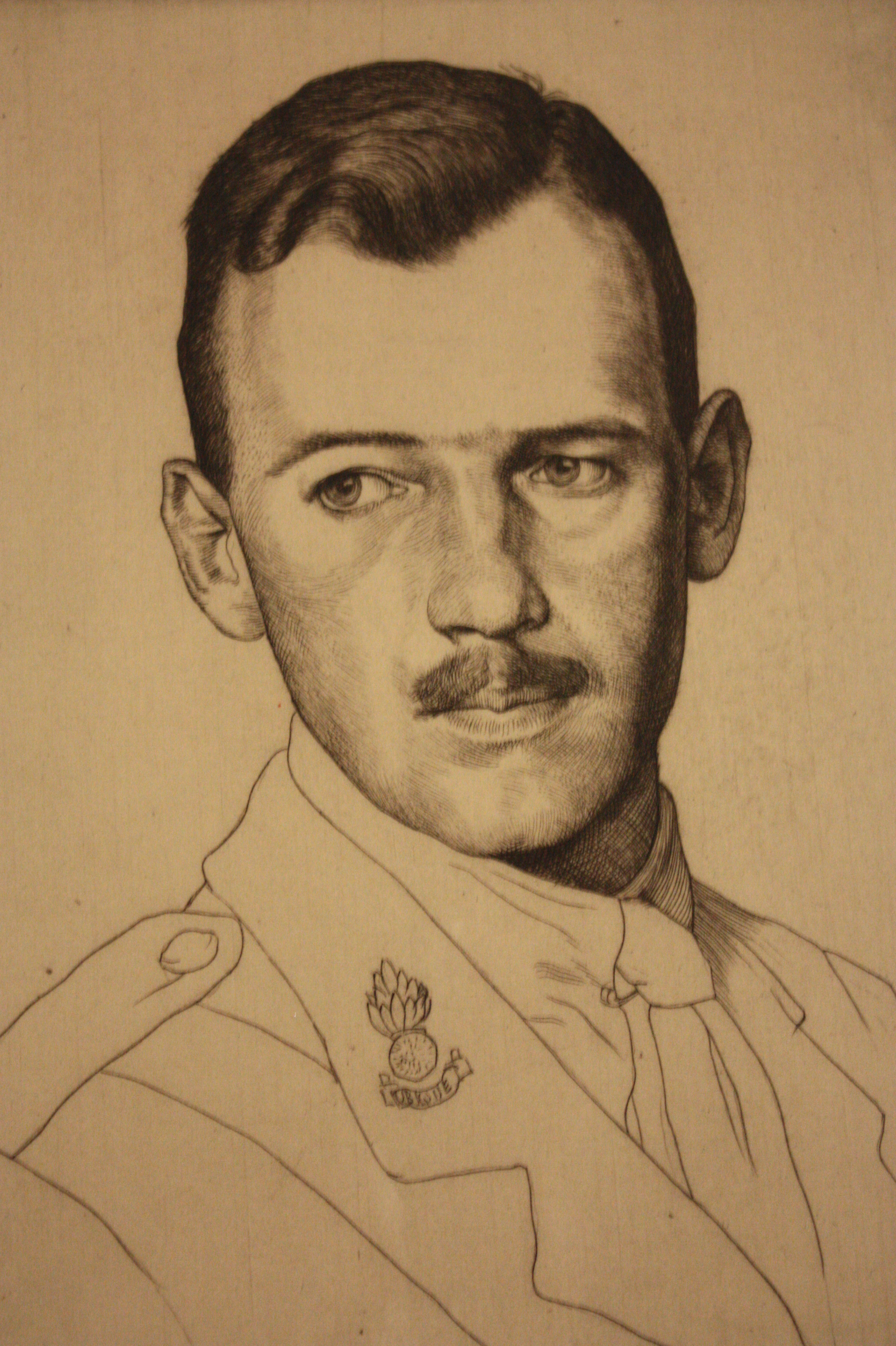
His son David Strang, c. 1915

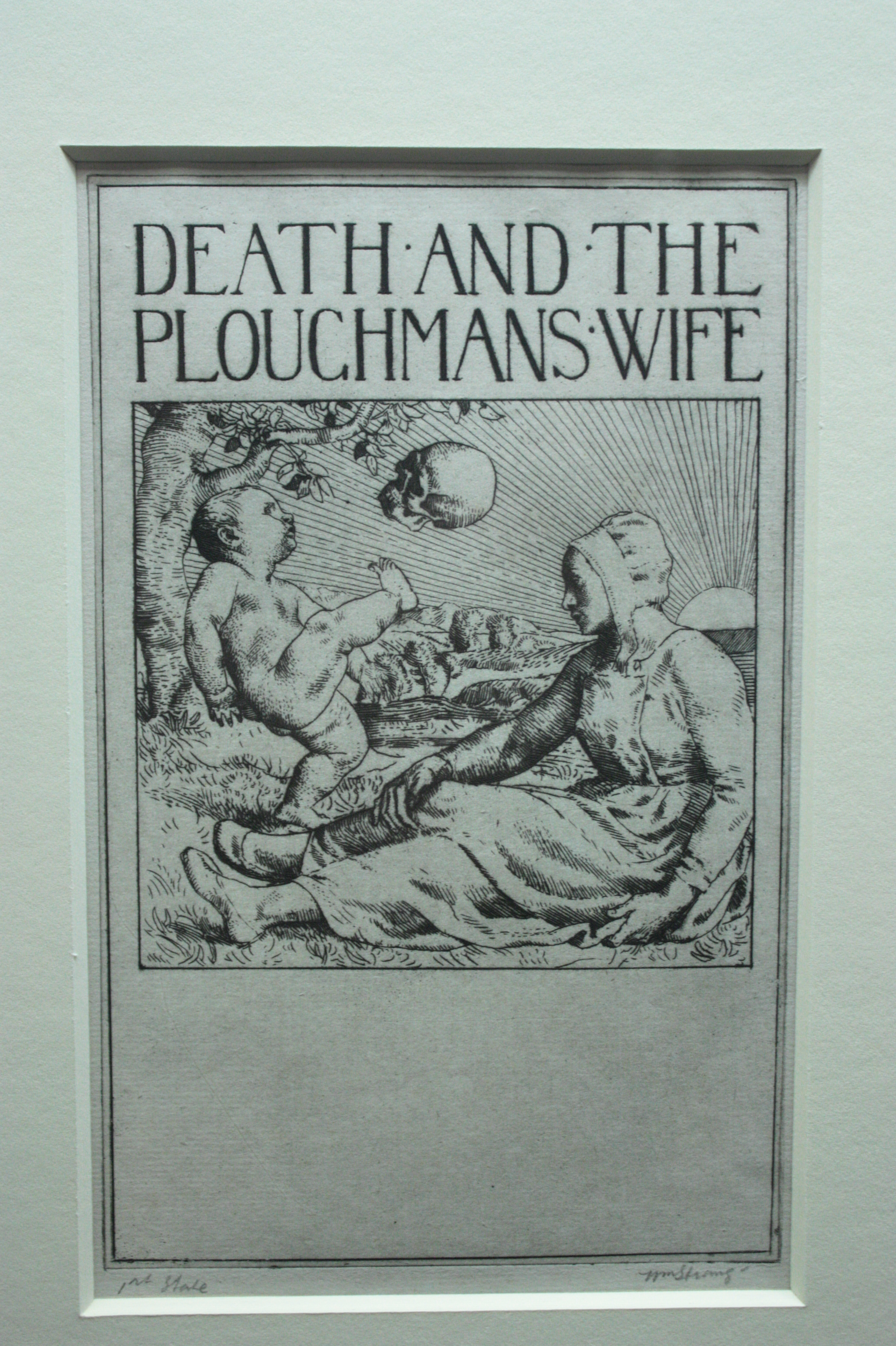
The cover of Death and the Ploughman's Wife

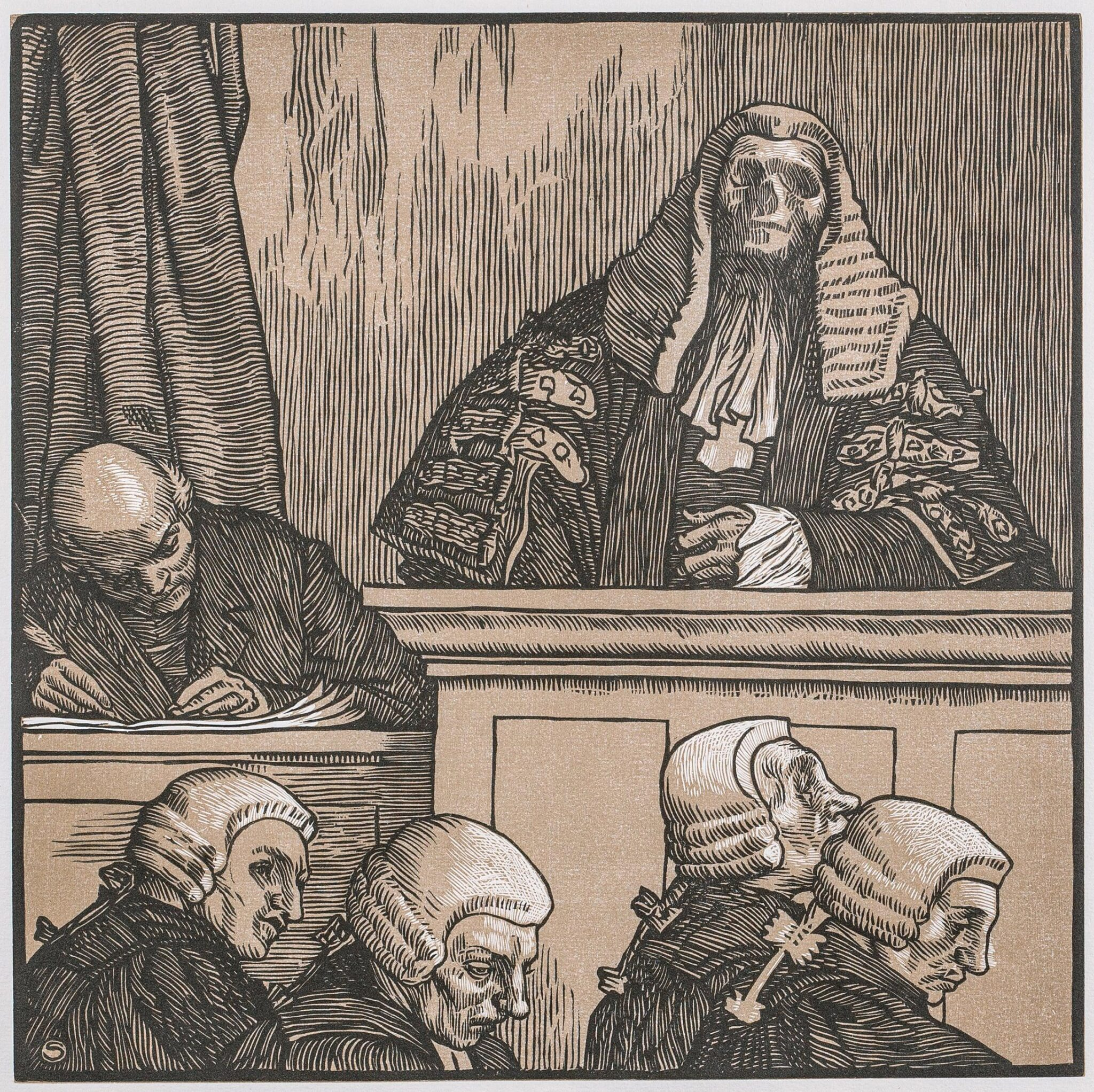
Death the Judge, from the twelve-image portfolio The Doings of Death (1901)

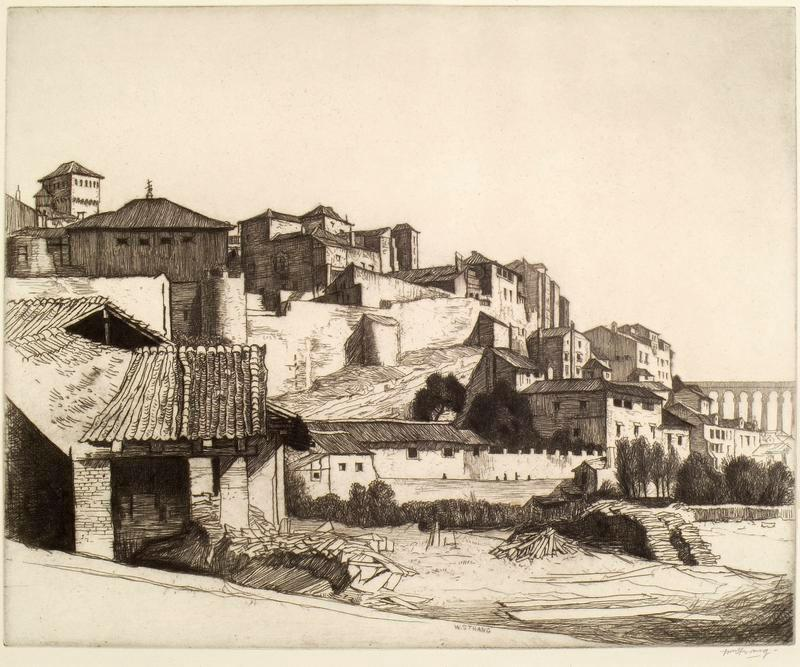
Old Walls And Roman Viaduct, Segovia

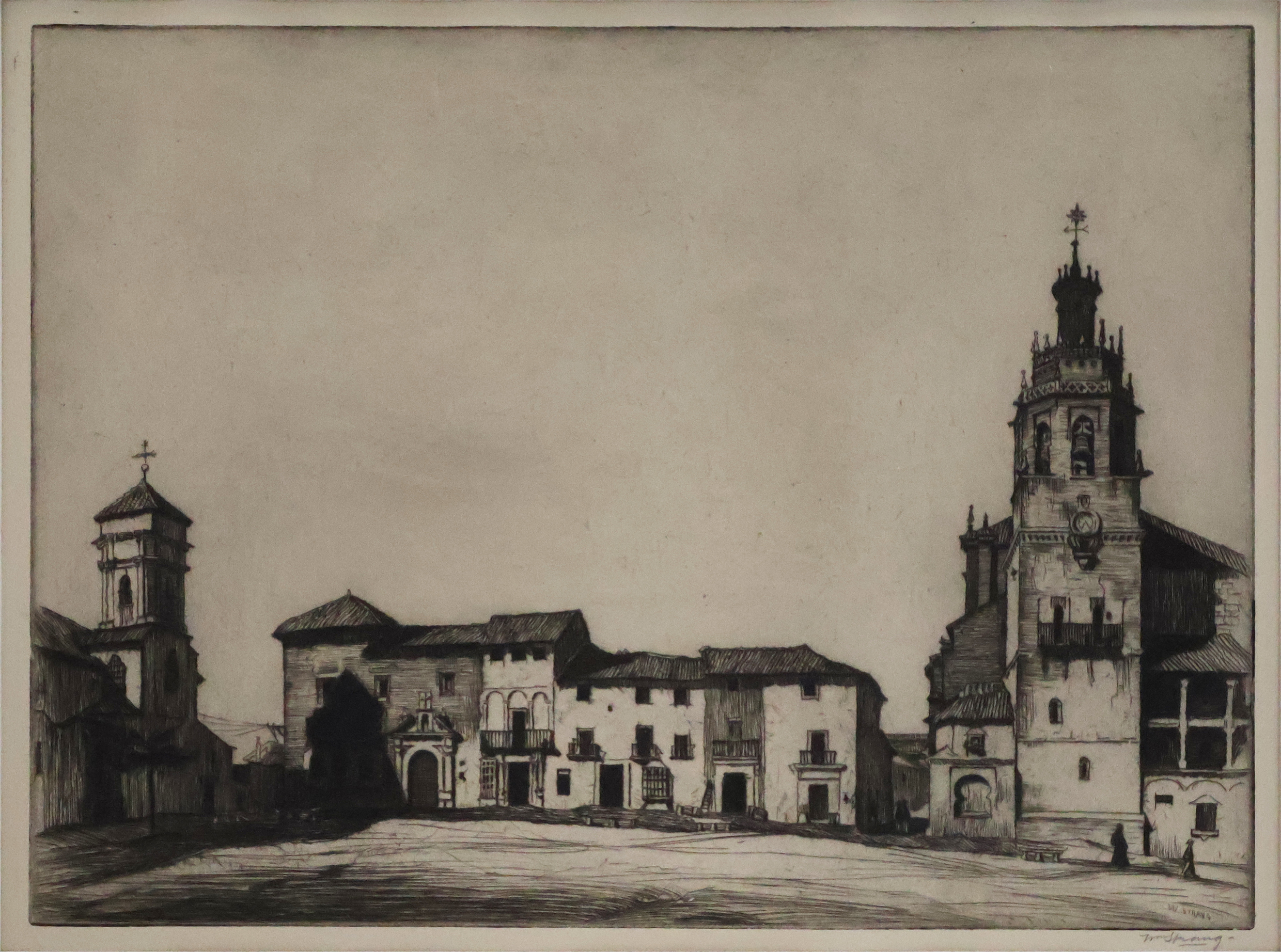
Plaza Mayor, Ronda, mezzotint by William Strang depicting Plaza Mayor (now renamed Plaza Duquesa de Parcent), Ronda, in the province of Málaga, Andalusia, 1913
