= Malcolm Osborne =

British printmaker

Malcolm Osborne CBE
- Born: 1 August 1880; Frome, Somerset, England
- Died: 22 September 1963 (aged 83)
- Education: Merchant Venturers' Technical College, Royal College of Art
- Known for: landscapes, urban views, portraits

Malcolm Osborne (1 August 1880 – 22 September 1963) was a British original printmaker known for his intaglio prints of landscapes, urban views and portraits.

== Chronology ==
- 1 August 1880 born at Frome, Somerset, the fourth son of Alfred Arthur Osborne (1847–1910), Schoolmaster, and his wife Sarah Elizabeth née Biggs,(1843-1907). He grew up in Frome and moved to Streatham, London with his elder brother Harold in the early 1900s.
- educated at the Merchant Venturers' Technical College, Bristol
- 1901 to 1906, he studied etching and engraving under Frank Short at the Royal College of Art, in South Kensington, London.
- 1904 published his first etching
- World War I served in Artists' Rifles and 60th Division in France, Salonika and Palestine
- 11 June 1918, he was elected Associate Engraver of Royal Academy.
- 1924 succeeded Short as the Head of the etching and engraving school when Short retired.
- 13 Apr 1926 elected full member of the Royal Academy
- 1927 Kensington, London married Amy Margaret Stableford (1884–1964).
- 1938-1962 held the position of President Royal Society of Painter-Etchers and Engravers (now the Royal Society of Painter-Printmakers)
- 1948 awarded Commander of the Order of the British Empire (CBE)
- 1 January 1956 elected Senior member of the Royal Academy
- 22 September 1963 died Kensington, London, England

== Bibliography ==
- Print Collector's Quarterly, XII, 1925, pp. 285–313. Entries: 86
- Malcolm Charles Salaman (introduction) (1929) The Etchings of Malcolm Osborne, R.A., R.E., incl. 12 leaves of plates (Modern Masters of Etching, no. 21) London: The Studio Ltd.; New York: William Edwin Rudge OCLC 556936 OCLC 877568110 OCLC 752179179

== Memberships and awards ==
- Commander of the Order of the British Empire (CBE)
- Member of the Royal Academy (R.A.)
- President of the Royal Society of Painter-Printmakers (P.R.E.)

== Students ==
- Geoffrey Wedgwood
- James Henry Govier
- James T.A. Osborne
