= Evelyn Gibbs =

British artist (1905–1991)

- Born: Evelyn Gibbs; 3 May 1905
- Died: 27 February 1991 (aged 85)
- Education: Liverpool School of Art; Royal College of Art
- Known for: Murals and portrait painting

Evelyn May Gibbs (3 May 1905 – 27 February 1991) was an English artist and teacher.

== Biography ==
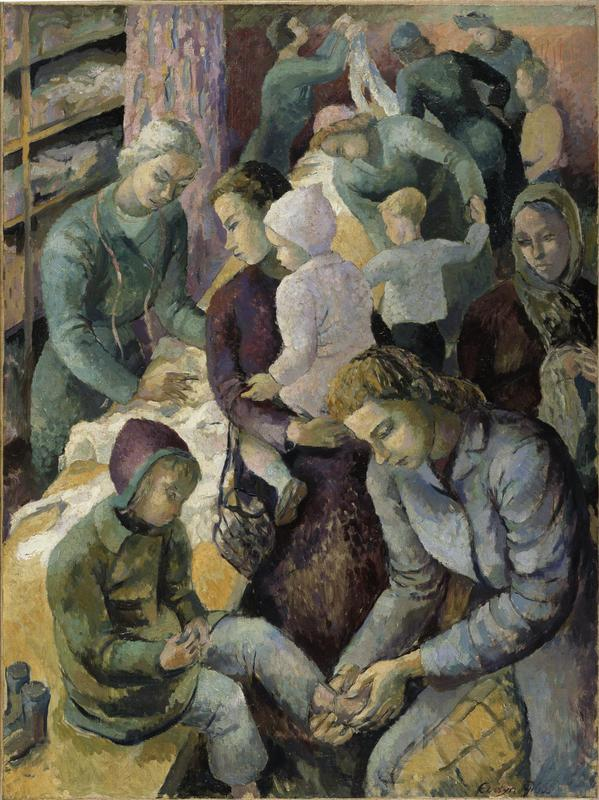
WVS Clothing Exchange (Art.IWM ART LD 3918)

Evelyn Gibbs was born in Liverpool on 3 May 1905. She studied at the Liverpool School of Art and at the Royal College of Art, before winning a Prix de Rome Scholarship for engraving in 1929, with which she spent two years in Italy. Supporting herself by teaching at a school for handicapped children, she wrote a book on art teaching illustrated by her pupils, and then became a teacher-training lecturer at Goldsmiths College. When Goldsmiths was evacuated to Nottingham during World War II, she created the Midlands Group of Artists: two exhibitions in a large empty building led to permanent gallery premises and a range of other activities supporting artists in the region. The Midlands Group of Artists painted murals at five locations throughout the region but none were thought to have survived. In 2009, workmen rewiring St Martin's Church in Bilborough, Nottingham uncovered two of Gibbs's murals, which had thought to have been destroyed in the 1970s. These murals have been restored and put on public display. In 1943 Gibbs submitted three works to the War Artists' Advisory Committee. These were purchased and led to her being commissioned to make a series of drawings concerning blood transfusion stations. A further commission on the work of the Women's Voluntary Service, (WVS), resulted in the painting WVS Clothing Exchange (1943).

Remaining in Nottingham after the war, she married Hugh Willat, later Secretary-General of the Arts Council. She continued drawing and painting until a stroke seven years before she died.

== Archive ==
In 2000, Aberystwyth University purchased a collection comprising 98 prints, drawings and watercolours from throughout her career from her husband's estate. This collection formed the basis of a retrospective exhibition held in 2001.

== Works ==
- The Teaching of Art in Schools, 1934.
