= Lady Camilla =

Lady Camilla may refer to:

- Lady Camilla Bloch (born 1970), British barrister
- Lady Camilla Dempster (née Osborne), only daughter of John Osborne, 11th Duke of Leeds

== See also ==
- Queen Camilla, sometimes mistakenly referred to as Lady Camilla
