= George Osborne, 10th Duke of Leeds =

British politician (1862–1927)

His Grace The Duke of Leeds JP MP
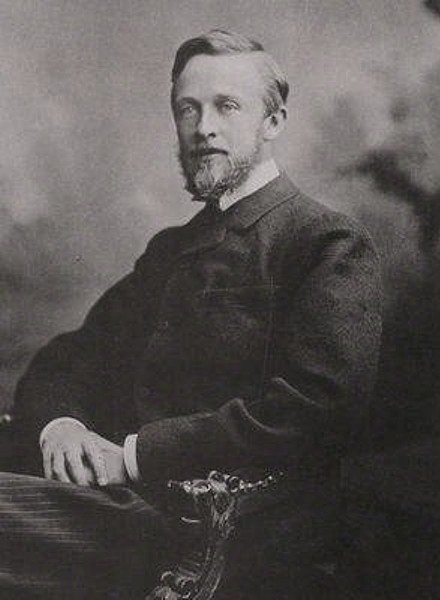

Treasurer of the Household
- In office 1895–1896
- Preceded by: Arthur George Brand
- Succeeded by: The Viscount Curzon

Member of Parliament for Brixton
- In office 1887–1895
- Preceded by: Ernest Baggallay
- Succeeded by: Evelyn Hubbard

Personal details
- Born: George Godolphin Osborne; 18 September 1862 Mayfair, London, England
- Died: 10 May 1927 (aged 64)
- Spouse: Lady Katherine Frances Lambton (m. 1884)
- Children: 5, include John Osborne, 11th Duke of Leeds
- Parent(s): George Osborne, 9th Duke of Leeds; Hon. Frances Georgiana Pitt-Rivers
- Education: Eton College
- Alma mater: Trinity College, Cambridge

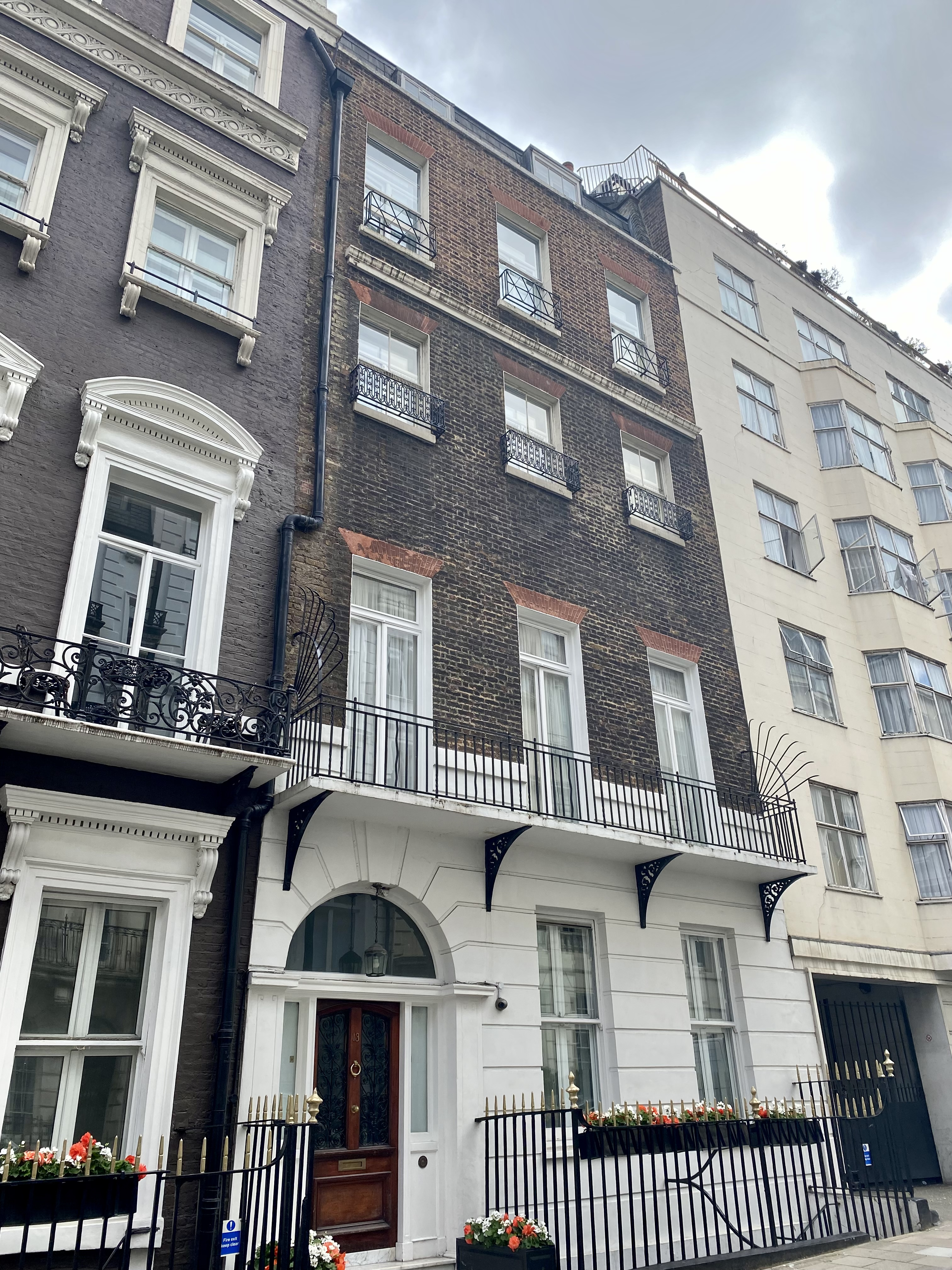
The Duke of Leeds was born at 13 Hertford Street, Mayfair

George Godolphin Osborne, 10th Duke of Leeds, JP (18 September 1862 – 10 May 1927), styled Earl of Danby from birth until 1872 and subsequently Marquess of Carmarthen until 1895, was a British peer and Conservative politician.

== Early life ==
Osborne was born at 13 Hertford Street in Mayfair, the second and oldest surviving son of The 9th Duke of Leeds and his wife, The Hon. Frances Georgiana Pitt-Rivers, daughter of The 4th Baron Rivers. Leeds was educated at Eton College and then at Trinity College, Cambridge.

== Career ==
He entered the British House of Commons, as Marquess of Carmarthen, in 1887, representing Brixton until December 1895, when he succeeded his father in his titles. In his first three years as Member of Parliament (MP), Lord Carmarthen was assistant secretary to The 1st Baron Knutsford.

He served as Treasurer of the Household in 1895 and 1896, and sat in the London County Council. Leeds was a Justice of the Peace for the North Riding of the County of York. He was a lieutenant in the Yorkshire Hussars and an honorary captain in the Royal Naval Volunteer Reserve. Leeds commanded the Royal Yacht Squadron and was a naval aide-de-camp to the King.

At the end of the nineteenth century, the Duke of Leeds was initiated into the fraternal society of the Ancient Order of Druids and was present in Stonehenge in August 1905 for the first massive ceremony organized by the A.O.D.

The Duke was noted for his racing greyhounds. His gambling debts played a part in the sale of the family seat Hornby Castle by his heir.

== Personal life ==
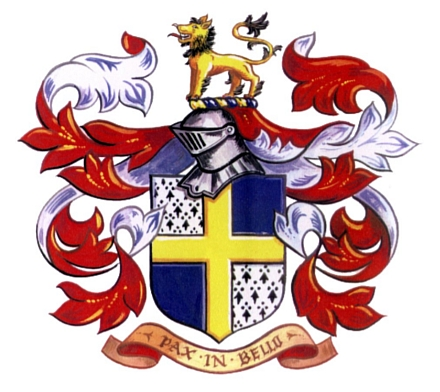
Ancestral arms of the Osborne family, Dukes of Leeds

On 13 February 1884 he married Lady Katherine Frances Lambton, second daughter of The 2nd Earl of Durham and Lady Beatrix Frances Hamilton, at St Paul's Church, Knightsbridge, and had by her, four daughters and one son.

- Lady Gwendolen Fanny Godolphin Osborne (1885–1933), who married Algernon Gascoyne-Cecil (son of Lt.-Col. Lord Eustace Brownlow Henry Gascoyne-Cecil) on 17 July 1923.
- Lady Olga Katherine Godolphin Osborne (1886–1929)
- Lady Dorothy Beatrix Godolphin Osborne (1888–1946), who married The 15th Earl of Strathmore and Kinghorne on 21 November 1908. They had four children (including Timothy Bowes-Lyon, 16th Earl of Strathmore and Kinghorne) and three grandchildren.
- Lady Moira Godolphin Osborne (1892–1976), who married The 1st Viscount Chandos on 30 January 1920. They had four children, including Antony Lyttelton, 2nd Viscount Chandos.
- John Francis Godolphin Osborne, 11th Duke of Leeds (1901–1963), who married Irma de Malkhazouny on 27 March 1933 and they were divorced in 1948. He remarried Audrey Young on 21 December 1948 and they were divorced in 1955. They have one daughter. He remarried, again, Caroline Fleur Vatcher on 22 February 1955.

Leeds died in London on 10 May 1927, aged sixty-four, and was buried on 14 May. He was succeeded in the peerage by his only son, John.

Parliament of the United Kingdom
| Preceded by Ernest Baggallay | Member of Parliament for Brixton; 1887–1895 | Succeeded by Evelyn Hubbard |
Political offices
| Preceded by Arthur George Brand | Treasurer of the Household; 1895–1896 | Succeeded by Viscount Curzon |
Peerage of England
| Preceded by George Osborne | Duke of Leeds; 1895–1927 | Succeeded by John Osborne |
