= Abel Buckley =

British politician

Abel Buckley (1835 – 23 December 1908) was a British cotton manufacturer and Liberal politician of Irish descent.

He was born in Ashton-under-Lyne, Lancashire, the younger son of Abel Buckley and Mary Keehan of Alderdale Lodge. He was educated at Mill Hill School and Owen's College. In 1875, he married Hannah Summers (who died in 1897) and they had one son, also Abel, born in 1876.

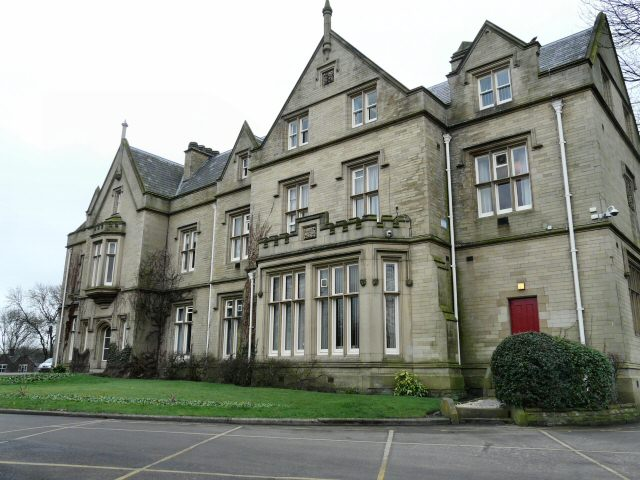
Ryecroft Hall

The Buckley family owned two cotton mills in Ashton: Ryecroft and Oxford Road, and Abel became involved in the business. At his death he was described as "one of the old cotton lords of Lancashire". In 1885 Buckley inherited Ryecroft Hall, Audenshaw, from his uncle, James Smith Buckley, and was to live there for the rest of his life. He subsequently inherited Galtee Castle, near Mitchelstown, County Cork. The estate had been purchased by his uncle, Nathaniel Buckley, MP for Stalybridge in 1873.

In 1885 Abel Buckley was elected Liberal MP for the newly created Prestwich constituency. In the general election of the following year, however, he was defeated.

Apart from his interests in the cotton industry, Buckley was a director and chairman of the Manchester and Liverpool District Banking Company and a justice of the peace. He was a collector of fine art, and a racehorse breeder. He died at Ryecroft Hall on 23 December 1908, aged 73.

Parliament of the United Kingdom
New constituency	Member of Parliament for Prestwich; 1885 – 1886	Succeeded by Robert Mowbray
