= 1900 Brixton by-election =

UK Parliamentary by-election

The 1900 Brixton by-election was a Parliamentary by-election held on 20 March 1900. The constituency returned one Member of Parliament (MP) to the House of Commons of the United Kingdom, elected by the first past the post voting system.

The seat had become vacant following the resignation of the incumbent Conservative MP, Evelyn Hubbard on the advice of his doctors. Hubbard vacated his Parliamentary seat by being appointed Steward of the Chiltern Hundreds on 14 March 1900. Hubbard had been Member of Parliament for the constituency since the 1896 Brixton by-election.

== Candidates ==
The Conservative candidate was Sir Robert Mowbray, Bt. Mowbray had been Member of Parliament for Prestwich from 1886 to 1895. Mowbray had been a member of the Royal Commission on Indian Expenditure in 1896. He also served as Prime Warden of the Goldsmiths' Company in 1898–99.

The Liberal Party decided not to contest the election, citing the nearness of the upcoming general election.

== Result ==
The date for nominations was set for Tuesday 20 March and polling day for Friday 23 March. As only one candidate was nominated, there was no poll.

1900 Brixton by-election
Party	Candidate	Votes	%	±%
Conservative	Robert Mowbray	Unopposed		
Registered electors		10,666		
Conservative hold				

== Aftermath ==
William Kidson, the Conservative Party election agent, died on Saturday 24 March of pneumonia. He was a Freemason.
