= Princess Camilla =

Princess Camilla may refer to:

- Camilla, Princess of Wales, wife and later queen consort of Charles III
- Princess Camilla, Duchess of Castro

== See also ==
- Princess Camille
- Lady Camilla (disambiguation)
