= Sir Robert Mowbray, 2nd Baronet =

British politician

Sir Robert Mowbray Bt DL
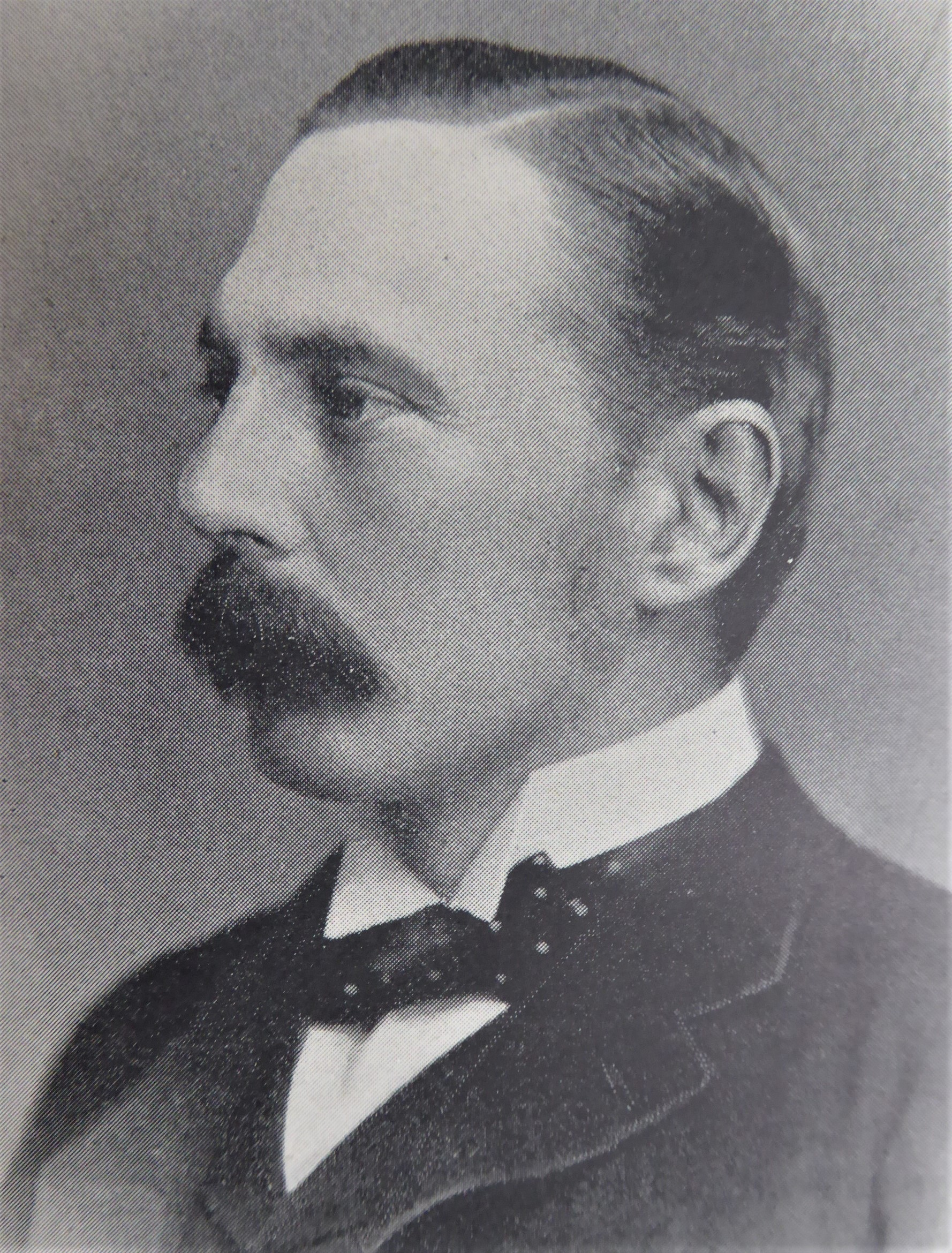
- Photograph of Sir Robert, c. 1895

Member of Parliament for Brixton
- In office 1900–1906
- Preceded by: Abel Buckley
- Succeeded by: Frederick Cawley

Member of Parliament for Prestwich
- In office 1886–1895
- Preceded by: Evelyn Hubbard
- Succeeded by: Joel Seaverns

Personal details
- Born: Robert Gray Cornish Mowbray; 21 May 1850
- Died: 23 July 1916 (aged 66)
- Party: Conservative
- Parent(s): Sir John Mowbray, 1st Baronet; Elizabeth Grey Mowbray
- Education: Eton College
- Alma mater: Balliol College, Oxford

Sir Robert Gray Cornish Mowbray, 2nd Baronet, DL (21 May 1850 – 23 July 1916), was a British Conservative politician.

== Early life ==
Mowbray was the eldest son of the Father of the House of Commons, Sir John Mowbray, 1st Baronet, and his wife Elizabeth Grey (née Mowbray). Among his siblings were his younger brothers, Reginald Ambrose Mowbray, later the 3rd Baronet, and the Reverend Edmund George Lionel Mowbray, later the 4th Baronet.

His paternal grandparents were Robert Stirling Cornish and the former Marianne Powning. His mother was the daughter, and sole heir, of George Isaac Mowbray of Bishopwearmouth and the former Elizabeth Gray.

He was educated at Eton College (1863–8) before graduating from Balliol College, Oxford with a Master of Arts degree in 1872. He was gazetted as a lieutenant in the part-time Royal Berkshire Militia on 1 June 1872, but he never joined the regiment for its annual training and resigned on 29 April 1874. He became a Fellow of All Souls in 1873 and a Barrister-at-law of the Inner Temple in 1876. He served as secretary of the Royal Commission on the Stock Exchange in 1876.

== Career ==
He was elected to Parliament for Prestwich at the 1886 general election, and held the seat until his defeat at the 1895 general election. From 1887 til 1892 he was Parliamentary Private Secretary to George Goschen, Chancellor of the Exchequer. He returned to the House of Commons at an unopposed by-election in March 1900 for the Brixton constituency, and held that seat until he stood down at the 1906 general election. He lived at 'Warennes Wood' at Stratfield Mortimer in Berkshire and was appointed a deputy lieutenant of that county in 1900.

He was a member of the Royal Commission on Opium in India from 1893 to 1895, and a member of the Royal Commission on Indian Expenditure in 1896.

== Personal life ==
Mowbray died, unmarried, in July 1916, aged 66.

Parliament of the United Kingdom
Preceded by Abel Buckley	Member of Parliament for Prestwich; 1886 – 1895	Succeeded by Frederick Cawley
Preceded by Evelyn Hubbard	Member of Parliament for Brixton; 1900 – 1906	Succeeded by Joel Seaverns
Baronetage of the United Kingdom
Preceded by John Robert Mowbray	Baronet (of Warennes Wood); 1899 – 1916	Succeeded by Reginald Ambrose Mowbray
