= Frederick Laverack =

English social worker, campaigner for the blind and Member of Parliament

Frederick Joseph Laverack (1871 – 11 April 1928) was an English social worker, campaigner for the blind and Liberal Member of Parliament. He contested Brixton in London on four occasions in the 1920s, winning on one occasion.

== Family and education ==
Frederick Joseph Laverack was born in Leeds, the younger son of George Laverack, grocer and tea merchant, and Elizabeth Turner. He was educated at St George's School, Leeds. Ranmoor College, Sheffield and privately. He studied the law but did not pursue it as a profession. Laverack married Rose Roberts from Leeds and they had a son and two daughters.

== Career ==
Laverack qualified as a minister with the Congregational church and had pastorates in Dewsbury, Yorkshire and later in Fulham. His chief social and philanthropic work was in assisting the blind. In 1916 he joined Sir Arthur Pearson the newspaper magnate and campaigner for the blind and organised the Blinded Soldiers’ Children Fund. He undertook the re-organisation of the Chaplains' Department of the National Institute for the Blind and was sometime Joint Secretary of the Greater London Fund for the Blind. He was a former director and general organiser of the Association for the Promoting the General Welfare of the Blind and was a highly successful fund-raiser for charitable purposes and well known as a speaker and lecturer on social causes. By 1922 he was being described as a business expert and organiser. He was also connected with the fund raising activities of the temperance organisation the Band of Hope Union.

== Politics ==
=== Anti Waste League ===
The Anti Waste League was founded by Lord Rothermere in 1921 and campaigned for reductions in government spending and taxation. Laverack was a member and was among the first list of candidates announced by the League to fight constituencies in London. Laverack was selected to fight St Pancras North. As a result of the campaign, the anti-waste call was taken up more vigorously inside the Conservative Party and the League was disbanded in 1922. Laverack gravitated to the Liberal Party.

=== 1922-1924 ===
Laverack was selected as Liberal candidate at the 1922 general election for the Brixton Division of Lambeth. The Anti-Waste League endorsed his candidacy but Laverack could not dislodge the sitting Conservative MP Sir Davison Dalziel. He fought Dalziel again at the 1923 general election and was this time successful. In a straight fight he won Brixton by a majority of 1,405 votes. This position was reversed however at the 1924 general election when Laverack faced Labour as well as Tory opponents. Dalziel was re-elected and Laverack dropped to the foot of the poll behind Labour.

General election 1922: Brixton
Party	Candidate	Votes	%	±%
Unionist	Sir Davison Alexander Dalziel	11,284	54.8	−6.5
Liberal	Frederick Joseph Laverack	9,316	45.2	+29.1
Majority		1,968	9.6	−29.1
Turnout		39,004	52.8	+10.0
Unionist hold		Swing	-17.8	

General election 1923: Brixton
Party	Candidate	Votes	%	±%
Liberal	Frederick Joseph Laverack	10,881	53.5	+8.3
Unionist	Sir Davison Alexander Dalziel	9,476	46.5	−8.3
Majority		1,405	7.0	16.6
Turnout		39,189	51.9	−0.9
Liberal gain from Unionist		Swing	+8.3	

General election 1924: Brixton
Party	Candidate	Votes	%	±%
Unionist	Sir Davison Alexander Dalziel	15,755	56.6	
Labour	James Adams	7,210	25.9	
Liberal	Frederick Joseph Laverack	4,871	17.5	
Majority		8,545	30.7	
Turnout		40,134	69.4	
Unionist gain from Liberal		Swing	+18.9	

=== Brixton by-election, 1927 ===
In 1927 Dalziel was given a peerage and this caused a by-election in Brixton. Laverack was re-selected as Liberal candidate and there again faced a three-cornered contest against Conservative and Labour opponents. The by-election was held on 27 June 1927 and the Conservatives easily retained the seat with 48% of the poll. Lavarack was again in third place behind Labour. This was to prove his last attempt to re-enter Parliament.

1927 Brixton by-election
Party	Candidate	Votes	%	±%
Unionist	Nigel Claudian Dalziel Colman	10,358	48.1	
Labour	James Adams	6,032	28.0	
Liberal	Frederick Joseph Laverack	5,134	23.9	
Majority		4,326	20.1	
Turnout		39,953	53.9	
Unionist hold		Swing	-5.3	

== Death ==
Laverack died from heart disease at his home in Upper Norwood, Surrey on 11 April 1928.

== Publications ==
- 1902: Life’s Asides. London: Arthur H. Stockwell
- 1905: These Sayings of Mine: A Manual on the Beatitudes for Christian People. London: A. Brown & Sons

Parliament of the United Kingdom
Preceded by Sir Davison Dalziel, Bt	Member of Parliament for Brixton; 1923 – 1924	Succeeded by Sir Davison Dalziel, Bt
