= Kensington and Chelsea Register Office =

Registry office in London, United Kingdom

Coordinates: 51°29′15″N 0°10′06″W

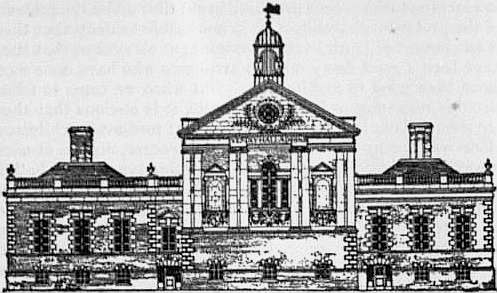
The old vestry hall in Chelsea Manor Gardens, part of the Chelsea Town Hall complex, the location of the register office, from Encyclopædia Britannica, 1911

Kensington and Chelsea Register Office is an office for the registration of births, deaths, marriages and civil partnerships located in Chelsea Old Town Hall in Chelsea, London. It has hosted the weddings of many notable people.

According to The Independent, in 2006 it was "still one of the hippest places to get married".

== Notable people married there ==
- William Cavendish, Marquess of Hartington and Kathleen "Kick" Kennedy (1944)
- Neil Aspinall, music industry executive and Suzy Ornstein (1968)
- Lionel Blair, dancer and Susan Davis (1967)
- Marc Bolan, singer and June Child (1970)
- Pierce Brosnan, actor and Cassandra Harris, actress (1980)
- Nigel Dempster, journalist, and Lady Camilla Osborne (1977)
- Judy Garland, actress and Mickey Deans (1969)
- Hugh Grant, actor and Anna Eberstein (2018)
- Patsy Kensit, actress and Jim Kerr, musician, (1992)
- Bobby Moore, footballer and Stephanie Parlane (1991)
- Prince Pavlos of Greece and Marie-Chantal Miller (1995)
- Irving Penn, American photographer, and Lisa Fonssagrives, Swedish fashion model (1950)
- Beth Rogan, actress and Tony Samuel, Shell oil heir and publisher (1962)
- Wallis Simpson, socialite and Ernest Simpson (1928)
- Sharon Tate, actress and Roman Polanski, film director (1968)
- Tracey Thorn and Ben Watt, pop musicians (2008)
- Marco Pierre White, chef and Alex McArthur (1988)
