= 1978 Lambeth Central by-election =

UK parliamentary by-election

The 1978 Lambeth Central by-election was held on 20 April 1978, following the death of Labour Party Member of Parliament for Lambeth Central Marcus Lipton.

While the seat had seen significant Labour majorities at the February and October 1974 UK general elections, and Lambeth in general was regarded as a safe Labour area, the party was struggling in the polls. They selected John Tilley, the leader of Wandsworth Borough Council who had unsuccessfully contested Kensington in the 1974 elections.

Labour's weak position gave the Conservative Party hope that it might gain the seat in a surprise victory. They stood Jeremy Hanley, a chartered accountant educated at Rugby School. The Liberal Party had little base in the area, but decided to contest the seat regardless.

Several minor parties hoped to do well in the by-election. The far right National Front had polled well in recent elections in London and maintained a high profile during the election campaign. Meanwhile, several far left groups organised in the area stood in the hope of combating the National Front and raising their own profiles. Actor Corin Redgrave stood for the Workers Revolutionary Party, while the Socialist Unity coalition and Socialist Party of Great Britain also stood, while the Socialist Workers Party stood in the name of their publication Flame - Black Workers Paper For Self Defence.

In total, eleven candidates stood, setting a new record for a by-election in the UK, one more than in the 1977 City of London and Westminster South by-election. This record was again broken at the 1981 Croydon North West by-election.

== Result ==
Labour held the seat, but with a significantly reduced majority, as the Conservatives picked up votes. While the National Front only won 6.2% of the vote, this enabled them to beat the Liberals into an embarrassing fourth place. Three of the socialist parties won around 1% of the votes each, a result which was most disappointing for the Workers Revolutionary Party, who had stood in the constituency in previous years and had stood a well-known candidate.

Tilley held the constituency until its abolition in 1983, but proved unable to win a new seat at that year's election; he contested Southwark and Bermondsey but was defeated by its Liberal MP, Simon Hughes. Hanley was elected for Richmond and Barnes at the 1983 general election. Blunt stood again for the seat in 1979 and unsuccessfully tried to win South East Cornwall in 1983. The National Front suffered several splits and declined in importance, never again beating a major party candidate at a by-election. The Socialist Workers Party decided against contesting elections, but the other socialist organisations stood candidates in 1979.

Lambeth Central by-election, 1978
Party	Candidate	Votes	%	±%
Labour	John Tilley	10,311	49.5	−10.5
Conservative	Jeremy Hanley	7,170	34.4	+8.2
National Front	Helena Steven	1,291	6.2	New
Liberal	David Blunt	1,104	5.3	−7.2
Socialist Unity	John Chase	287	1.4	New
Workers Revolutionary	Corin Redgrave	271	1.3	+0.4
Socialist Workers	Anthony Bogues	201	1.0	New
Socialist (GB)	Barry McNeeney	91	0.4	New
Independent	Alan Whereat	55	0.3	New
South London People's Front	Stuart Monro	38	0.2	New
Democratic Monarchist	Bill Boaks	27	0.1	New
Majority		3,141	15.1	−18.8
Turnout		20,846	44.5	−8.1
Labour hold		Swing	-9.4	

== Previous result ==
Lambeth Central: October 1974 general election
Party	Candidate	Votes	%	±%
Labour	Marcus Lipton	15,381	60.0	+7.2
Conservative	Nicholas Lyell	6,704	26.2	−2.2
Liberal	P. Easton	3,211	12.5	−4.8
Workers Revolutionary	S. Smart	233	0.9	−0.2
Marxist-Leninist (England)	P. Bratton	88	0.3	−0.0
Majority		8,677	33.8	+9.5
Turnout		25,617	52.6	−9.7
Labour hold		Swing	+4.7	

== See also ==
- Lists of United Kingdom by-elections
