= Ernest Baggallay =

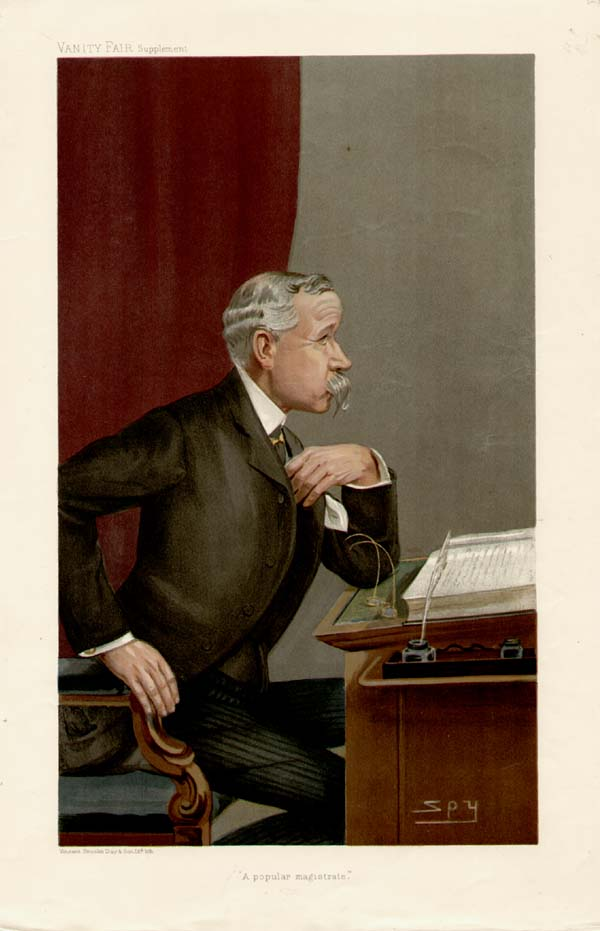
"A popular magistrate". Caricature by Spy published in Vanity Fair in 1905.

Ernest Baggallay (11 July 1850 – 9 September 1931) was an English barrister and Conservative politician who sat in the House of Commons from 1885 to 1887. He resigned to become a stipendary magistrate.

Bagallay was the son of Lord Justice Richard Baggalay, and his wife Ann Lacy, daughter of Henry Charles Lacy M.P. for Bodmin. He was educated at Marlborough College and Gonville and Caius College, Cambridge. He was called to the bar at Lincoln's Inn in 1873, and was engaged as legal counsel by the General Post Office from 1877 to 1887.

At the 1885 general election Baggallay was elected as a Member of Parliament for Brixton in south London. He held the seat at the ensuing contest in 1886. He resigned his seat in 1887 (by taking the office of Steward of the Manor of Northstead), in order to become stipendiary magistrate for West Ham.

In July 1901 Baggallay became a Metropolitan Police magistrate, and served on the benches at Greenwich, Tower Bridge and Lambeth. He became ill in 1913, and resigned from the magistracy in March of the following year.

Baggallay died at his London home in 1931, aged 81.

Baggallay married Emily Burrell daughter of Sir Walter Wyndham Burrell, 5th Baronet, and they had three sons and two daughters.

Parliament of the United Kingdom
New constituency	Member of Parliament for Brixton; 1885 – 1887	Succeeded by Marquess of Carmarthen
