= Brixton (UK Parliament constituency) =

Parliamentary constituency in the United Kingdom, 1885–1974

- Former borough constituency for the House of Commons
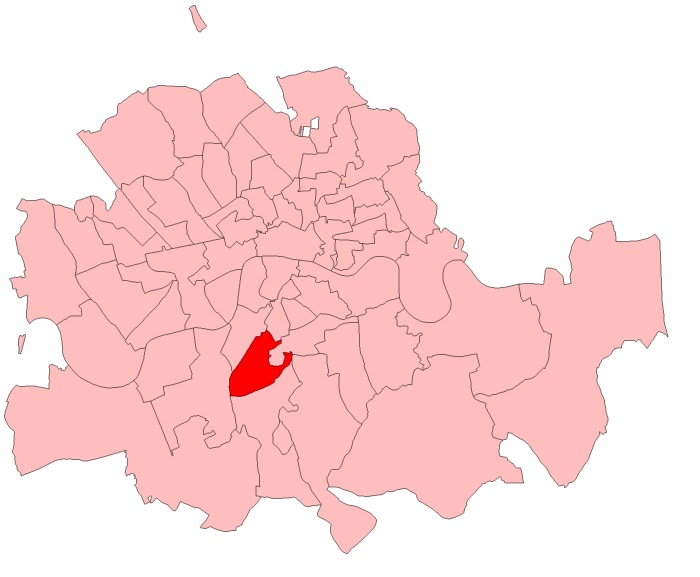
- Brixton in London 1885–1918
- County: Greater London

1885–1974
- Seats: One
- Created from: Lambeth
- Replaced by: Lambeth Central

Brixton was a parliamentary constituency centred on the Brixton district of South London. It returned one Member of Parliament (MP) to the House of Commons of the Parliament of the United Kingdom, elected by the first-past-the-post system.

== History ==
The constituency was created for the 1885 general election, and abolished for the February 1974 general election, when it was largely replaced by the new Lambeth Central constituency.

== Boundaries ==
=== 1885–1918 ===

The constituency was created by the Redistribution of Seats Act 1885, when the existing two-member Parliamentary Borough of Lambeth was divided into four single-member divisions. The seat, formally known as Lambeth, Brixton Division, comprised part of the civil parish of Lambeth, and was defined in terms of the wards used for elections to the parish vestry under the Metropolis Management Act 1855 as follows:

- The parts of Brixton and Stockwell wards to the north of the centres of Acre Lane and Coldharbour Lane
- The part of Vauxhall ward to the east of the centre of Clapham Road.

=== 1918–1950 ===
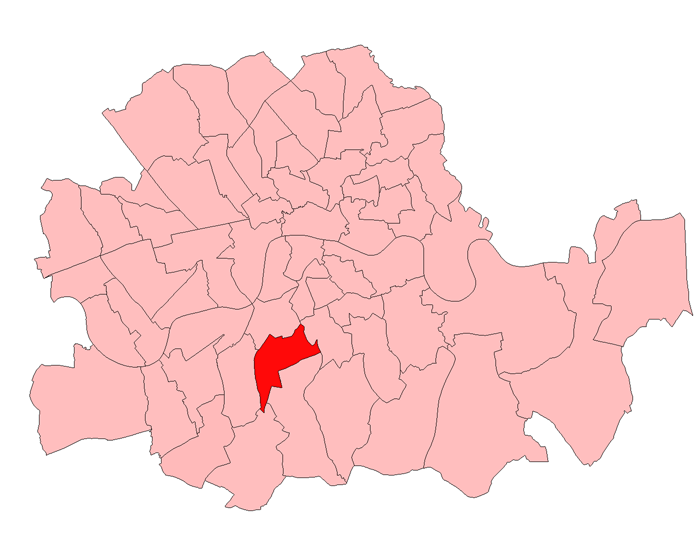
Brixton in London 1918–50

The Representation of the People Act 1918 redrew constituencies throughout Great Britain and Ireland. In London, the seats were redefined in terms of the wards of the Metropolitan Boroughs of the County of London, which had been created in 1900. Accordingly, the constituency was defined as consisting of the following areas of the Metropolitan Borough of Lambeth:

- Stockwell ward.
- The part of Brixton ward to the south of a line running from Clapham Road along the middle of Stockwell Park Road, Grove Road, Brixton Road, Mostyn Road, Akerman Road and Lothian Road and across Camberwell New Road to Wyndham Road.
- The part of Herne Hill Ward to the north of a line running from Coldharbour Lane along the north side of the London, Brighton and South Coast Railway to Denmark Hill.
- The part of Tulse Hill to the north and west of a line running along the middle of Brixton Hill from Mill Lane to Water Lane, along the middle of Water Lane to Effra Road, and along the middle of Effra Road to Coldharbour Lane.

=== 1950–1974 ===
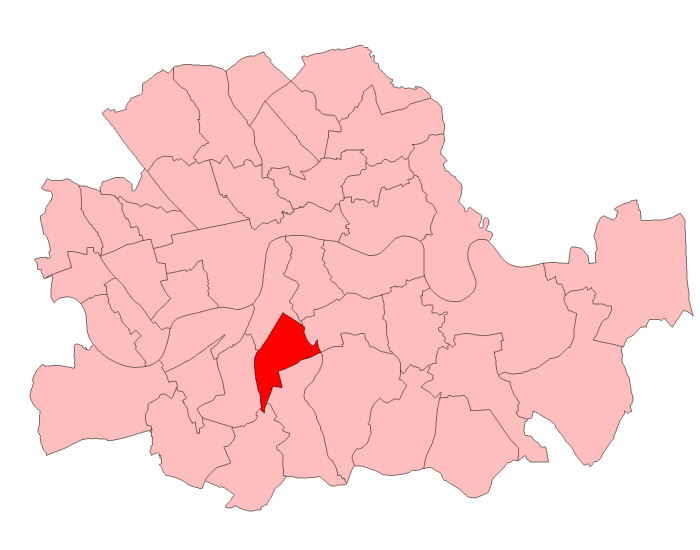
Brixton in London 1950–74

The final boundary change was made by the Representation of the People Act 1948, and came into effect at the 1950 general election. The 1948 Act introduced the term "borough constituency". Due to a population decrease in Lambeth, the number of constituencies in the borough was reduced from four to three. The new Lambeth Brixton Borough Constituency was defined as consisting of four wards of the metropolitan borough as they existed at the end of 1947:

- "The Angell, Stockwell, Town Hall, and Vassal wards of the borough of Lambeth"

Local government was completely reorganised in Greater London in 1965, and the metropolitan borough was abolished to be replaced by the larger London Borough of Lambeth. However these changes were not reflected in parliamentary boundaries until the general election of 1974. The Brixton constituency was largely replaced by the new seat of Lambeth Central

== Members of Parliament ==
Election	Member	Party
1885	Ernest Baggallay	Conservative
1887 by-election	Marquess of Carmarthen, later became The 10th Duke of Leeds in December 1895	Conservative
1896 by-election	Evelyn Hubbard	Conservative
1900 by-election	Sir Robert Mowbray	Conservative
1906	Joel Seaverns	Liberal
1910	Davison Dalziel, later Baron Dalziel	Conservative
1923	Frederick Joseph Laverack	Liberal
1924	Davison Dalziel, later Baron Dalziel	Unionist
1927 by-election	Nigel Colman	Conservative
1945	Marcus Lipton	Labour
Feb 1974	constituency abolished: see Lambeth Central	

== Elections ==
=== Elections in the 1880s ===
General election 1885: Brixton
Party	Candidate	Votes	%	±%
Conservative	Ernest Baggallay	3,427	55.4	
Liberal	William Blake Odgers	2,762	44.6	
Majority		665	10.8	
Turnout		6,189	77.7	
Registered electors		7,963		
Conservative win (new seat)				

General election 1886: Brixton
Party	Candidate	Votes	%	±%
Conservative	Ernest Baggallay	3,300	63.6	+8.2
Liberal	Montagu Hughes Cookson	1,886	36.4	−8.2
Majority		1,414	27.2	+16.4
Turnout		5,186	65.1	−12.6
Registered electors		7,963		
Conservative hold		Swing	+8.2	

Baggallay resigned after being appointed a Metropolitan Police Magistrate, causing a by-election.

By-election, 19 Jul 1887: Brixton
Party	Candidate	Votes	%	±%
Conservative	George Osborne	3,307	56.3	−7.3
Liberal	James Hill	2,569	43.7	+7.3
Majority		738	12.6	−14.6
Turnout		5,876	69.5	+4.4
Registered electors		8,455		
Conservative hold		Swing	-7.3	

=== Elections in the 1890s ===
Richard Stapley

General election 1892: Brixton
Party	Candidate	Votes	%	±%
Conservative	George Osborne	4,061	55.9	−7.7
Liberal	Richard Stapley	3,204	44.1	+7.7
Majority		857	11.8	−15.4
Turnout		7,265	74.2	+9.1
Registered electors		9,789		
Conservative hold		Swing	+7.7	

General election 1895: Brixton
Party	Candidate	Votes	%	±%
Conservative	George Osborne	4,199	65.6	+9.7
Liberal	Sir Robert Garnett Head, 3rd Baronet	2,199	34.4	−9.7
Majority		2,000	31.2	+19.4
Turnout		6,398	62.4	−11.8
Registered electors		10,253		
Conservative hold		Swing	+9.7	

1896 Brixton by-election
Party	Candidate	Votes	%	±%
Conservative	Evelyn Hubbard	4,493	67.8	+2.2
Liberal	E.W. Nunn	2,131	32.2	−2.2
Majority		2,362	35.6	+4.4
Turnout		6,624	64.1	+1.7
Registered electors		10,327		
Conservative hold		Swing	+2.2	

=== Elections in the 1900s ===
1900 Brixton by-election
Party	Candidate	Votes	%	±%
Conservative	Robert Mowbray	Unopposed		
Registered electors		10,666		
Conservative hold				

General election 1900: Brixton
Party	Candidate	Votes	%	±%
Conservative	Robert Mowbray	Unopposed		
Registered electors		10,666		
Conservative hold				

General election 1906: Brixton
Party	Candidate	Votes	%	±%
Liberal	Joel Seaverns	4,521	51.6	New
Conservative	Davison Dalziel	4,235	48.4	N/A
Majority		286	3.2	N/A
Turnout		8,756	79.5	N/A
Registered electors		11,010		
Liberal gain from Conservative		Swing	N/A	

=== Elections in the 1910s ===
General election January 1910: Brixton
Party	Candidate	Votes	%	±%
Conservative	Davison Dalziel	5,465	55.2	+6.8
Liberal	Joel Seaverns	4,427	44.8	−6.8
Majority		1,038	10.4	N/A
Turnout		9,892	86.5	+7.0
Registered electors		11,442		
Conservative gain from Liberal		Swing	+6.8	

General election December 1910: Brixton
Party	Candidate	Votes	%	±%
Conservative	Davison Dalziel	4,770	56.3	+1.1
Liberal	Joel Seaverns	3,702	43.7	−1.1
Majority		1,068	12.6	+2.2
Turnout		8,472	74.0	−12.5
Registered electors		11,442		
Conservative hold		Swing	+1.1	

General Election 1914–15:

Another General Election was required to take place before the end of 1915. The political parties had been making preparations for an election to take place and by July 1914, the following candidates had been selected;

- Unionist: Davison Dalziel
- Liberal:

General election 1918: Brixton
Party		Candidate	Votes	%	±%
C	Unionist	Davison Dalziel	9,902	61.3	+5.0
	NFDDSS	Stephen Kelley	3,641	22.6	New
	Liberal	Horace Norton	2,594	16.1	−27.6
Majority			6,261	38.7	+26.1
Turnout			37,745	42.8	−31.2
	Unionist hold		Swing	+17.3	
C indicates candidate endorsed by the coalition government.

=== Elections in the 1920s ===
General election 1922: Brixton
Party	Candidate	Votes	%	±%
Unionist	Davison Dalziel	11,284	54.8	−6.5
Liberal	Frederick Joseph Laverack	9,316	45.2	+29.1
Majority		1,968	9.6	−29.1
Turnout		20,600	52.8	+10.0
Registered electors		39,004		
Unionist hold		Swing	−17.8	

General election 1923: Brixton
Party	Candidate	Votes	%	±%
Liberal	Frederick Joseph Laverack	10,881	53.5	+8.3
Unionist	Davison Dalziel	9,476	46.5	−8.3
Majority		1,405	7.0	N/A
Turnout		20,357	51.9	−0.9
Registered electors		39,189		
Liberal gain from Unionist		Swing	+8.3	

General election 1924: Brixton
Party	Candidate	Votes	%	±%
Unionist	Davison Dalziel	15,755	56.6	+10.1
Labour	James Adams	7,210	25.9	New
Liberal	Frederick Joseph Laverack	4,871	17.5	−36.0
Majority		8,545	30.7	N/A
Turnout		28,099	69.4	+17.5
Registered electors		40,134		
Unionist gain from Liberal		Swing	+18.9	

1927 Brixton by-election
Party	Candidate	Votes	%	±%
Unionist	Nigel Colman	10,358	48.1	−8.5
Labour	James Adams	6,032	28.0	+2.1
Liberal	Frederick Joseph Laverack	5,134	23.9	+6.4
Majority		4,326	20.1	−10.6
Turnout		21,524	53.9	−15.5
Registered electors		39,953		
Unionist hold		Swing	−5.3	

General election 1929: Brixton
Party	Candidate	Votes	%	±%
Unionist	Nigel Colman	14,252	44.9	−11.7
Labour	A.B. Bishop	10,089	31.7	+5.8
Liberal	Arthur Stanley Quick	7,438	23.4	+5.9
Majority		4,163	13.2	−17.5
Turnout		31,779	62.4	−7.0
Registered electors		50,956		
Unionist hold		Swing	−8.8	

=== Elections in the 1930s ===
General election 1931: Brixton
Party	Candidate	Votes	%	±%
Conservative	Nigel Colman	24,673	77.0	+32.1
Labour	Edward Albert Radice	7,358	23.0	−8.7
Majority		17,315	54.0	+40.8
Turnout		52,569	60.9	−1.5
Conservative hold		Swing	+20.4	

General election 1935: Brixton
Party	Candidate	Votes	%	±%
Conservative	Nigel Colman	17,414	57.6	−19.4
Labour	Marcus Lipton	10,908	36.1	+13.1
Liberal	Arthur Stanley Quick	1,911	6.3	New
Majority		6,506	21.5	−32.5
Turnout		51,713	58.5	+2.4
Conservative hold		Swing	-16.3	

General Election 1939–40

Another General Election was required to take place before the end of 1940. The political parties had been making preparations for an election to take place and by the Autumn of 1939, the following candidates had been selected;

- Conservative: Nigel Colman
- Labour: Marcus Lipton

=== Elections in the 1940s ===
General election 1945: Brixton
Party	Candidate	Votes	%	±%
Labour	Marcus Lipton	15,583	63.6	+27.5
Conservative	Nigel Colman	8,928	36.4	−21.2
Majority		6,655	27.2	N/A
Turnout		37,493	65.4	+6.9
Labour gain from Conservative		Swing	+24.4	

=== Elections in the 1950s ===
General election 1950: Brixton
Party	Candidate	Votes	%	±%
Labour	Marcus Lipton	24,015	52.8	−10.8
Conservative	Anthony Herbert Foord	18,957	41.7	+5.3
Liberal	Enid Lakeman	2,527	5.5	New
Majority		5,058	11.1	−16.1
Turnout		56,082	81.1	+15.7
Labour hold		Swing	-8.1	

General election 1951: Brixton
Party	Candidate	Votes	%	±%
Labour	Marcus Lipton	24,776	56.1	+3.3
Conservative	Patricia M. Marlowe	19,423	43.9	+2.2
Majority		5,353	12.2	+1.1
Turnout		55,362	79.8	−1.3
Labour hold		Swing	+0.6	

General election 1955: Brixton
Party	Candidate	Votes	%	±%
Labour	Marcus Lipton	20,594	57.0	+0.9
Conservative	William Roots	15,559	43.0	−0.9
Majority		5,035	14.0	+1.8
Turnout		53,045	68.2	−11.6
Labour hold		Swing	+0.9	

General election 1959: Brixton
Party	Candidate	Votes	%	±%
Labour	Marcus Lipton	18,117	53.1	−3.9
Conservative	Brian Warren	16,005	46.9	+3.9
Majority		2,112	6.2	−7.8
Turnout		52,261	65.3	−2.9
Labour hold		Swing	-3.9	

=== Elections in the 1960s ===
General election 1964: Brixton
Party	Candidate	Votes	%	±%
Labour	Marcus Lipton	16,518	58.1	+5.0
Conservative	Kenneth P. Payne	11,934	41.9	−5.0
Majority		4,584	16.2	+10.0
Turnout		49,903	57.0	−8.3
Labour hold		Swing	+5.0	

General election 1966: Brixton
Party	Candidate	Votes	%	±%
Labour	Marcus Lipton	16,634	61.3	+3.2
Conservative	Piers Dixon	10,500	38.7	−3.2
Majority		6,134	22.6	+6.4
Turnout		47,615	57.0	0.0
Labour hold		Swing	+3.2	

=== Elections in the 1970s ===
General election 1970: Brixton
Party	Candidate	Votes	%	±%
Labour	Marcus Lipton	13,053	57.3	−4.0
Conservative	James W. Harkess	9,727	42.7	+4.0
Majority		3,326	14.6	−8.0
Turnout		43,372	52.5	−4.5
Labour hold		Swing	-4.0	
