= Irma de Malkhazouny =

French-born Serbian ballet dancer

- Duchess of Leeds
- Born: Irma Amélie de Malkhazouny; 25 May 1908; Paris; 16th arrondissement
- Died: 5 January 2000 (aged 91); Neuilly-sur-Seine, Hauts-de-Seine
- Noble family: Osborne family (by marriage)
- Spouses: Paul Brewster (divorced) John Osborne, 11th Duke of Leeds (m. 1933; div. 1948) Frank Atherton Howard
- Father: Iskender de Malkhazouny
- Occupation: Ballet dancer

Irma Amélie de Malkhazouny (25 May 1908 – 5 January 2000), formerly Irma Osborne, Duchess of Leeds, was a French-born Serbian ballet dancer. She was Duchess of Leeds from 1933 until 1948, during her marriage to John Osborne, 11th Duke of Leeds.

== Biography ==
Irma Amélie de Malkhazouny was a professional ballet dancer. She married Paul Brewster, but later divorced. On 27 March 1933, she married John Osborne, 11th Duke of Leeds in Nice, France.<nytimes/> Her husband was the son of George Osborne, 10th Duke of Leeds and Lady Katherine Lambton. The marriage produced no children, and ended in 1948 when de Malkhazouny had an affair with Frank Atherton Howard, an American millionaire. In 1947 she married Howard. The duke went on to marry two other times, to Audrey Young and Caroline Fleur Vatcher.

She was photographed by Norman Parkinson.
