= Revolutionary Communist Party of Britain (Marxist–Leninist) =

Orthodox communist party in Britain

Revolutionary Communist Party of Britain (Marxist-Leninist)
- Leader: National Leader: Chris Coleman; General Secretary: Michael Chant; Collective leadership: Central Committee
- Founded: 1979; 47 years ago
- Headquarters: John Buckle Centre, 170 Wandsworth Road, London SW8 2LA
- Newspaper: Workers Daily; Workers Weekly
- Membership (1985 est.): 750
- Ideology: Communism; Marxism-Leninism; Hoxhaism; Anti-revisionism
- Political position: Far-left
- Colours: Red

Election symbol
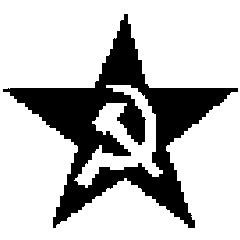

Website
- www.RCPBML.org.uk

The Revolutionary Communist Party of Britain (Marxist–Leninist) (RCPB-ML), occasionally referred to as RCP, is a small British Marxist-Leninist and Hoxhaist political party, previously named the Communist Party of England (Marxist-Leninist) (CPE (ML)) on formation in 1972 until being reorganised in 1979 after rejecting Maoism and aligning with Hoxhaism. The party's thinking is based on the politics of Hardial Bains, who travelled the world founding orthodox (anti-revisionist) communist parties.

== History ==
=== Origins (1967–1979) ===
The Revolutionary Communist Party of Britain (Marxist–Leninist) has its origins in the Sussex University-based English student movement, part of the Hardial Bains-inspired tendency, known as the Internationalists; and it formed following their Necessity For Change conference in 1967. Renamed the English Communist Movement (Marxist-Leninist) in 1970, the group founded the Communist Party of England (Marxist-Leninist) (CPE (ML)) in March 1972.

Like other Bains-inspired parties, the CPE (ML) took the Chinese side in the Sino-Soviet split, thus being endorsed by Albania, allied at the time with Maoist China, and opposing both the capitalist West and the Soviet bloc in accordance with the Three Worlds Theory promoted by Beijing. However, during the deterioration in Sino-Albanian relations, the CPE (ML) increasingly sided with Enver Hoxha, developed party-to-party relations with the Party of Labour of Albania, and renounced China as revisionist.

The CPE (ML) made headlines during its first two years. In May 1973, members of affiliated group, the Birmingham Student Movement, instigated a widely reported physical attack on Hans Eysenck at the London School of Economics (LSE). In January 1974, four members of the party were found guilty of possession of petrol bombs and assaulting police. At least one member had received a five-year sentence for malicious wounding and assault the previous year.

In 1973, the party put forward two candidates in parliamentary by-elections, and in 1974, stood for six seats in the February general election, and eight in the October general election. Their highest recorded vote was 612 (1.2%) in Portsmouth South during the second 1974 general election.

In 1974, the Communist Party of England (Marxist-Leninist) lost around a tenth of its membership following the expulsion of Aravindan Balakrishnan and an associated group accused of "conspiratorial and splittist activities and social fascist slanders against the Party and the proletarian movement". The group became the Workers' Institute of Marxism–Leninism–Mao Zedong Thought.

The party had links with the progressive music milieu in the 1970s, with avant-garde composers such as Cornelius Cardew and Michael Chant being leading members.

=== RCPB-ML (1979–present) ===
The Communist Party of England (Marxist-Leninist) was renamed the Revolutionary Communist Party of Britain (Marxist–Leninist) in 1979. It is closely related to the Communist Party of Canada (Marxist-Leninist), and has good relations with the New Communist Party of Britain (founded 1977). It produces an internet newspaper called Workers' Daily Internet Edition (WDIE), and has a bookshop in south London named John Buckle Books (named after the RCPB-ML founding general secretary). It has been active in promoting solidarity with North Korea. In 2004, the party declared electoral support for the Respect Coalition, but it now calls for an end to the system that brings parties to power, and calls on workers' and peoples' collectives to intervene directly in the political process. The party has a system of collective leadership, and its General Secretary is Michael Chant. The party's logo is a black hammer and sickle within a yellow star on a red background.

Cornelius Cardew died in 1981, John Buckle in 1983, and Hardial Bains in 1997.

RCPB-ML official Roger Nettleship has stood for House of Commons seats such as Jarrow in 2005 and South Shields in 2001 and 2010.

The party supported Brexit in the 2016 referendum.

== CPE (ML) election results ==
=== By-elections, 1970–1974 ===
election	candidate	votes	percentage	position
1973 Manchester Exchange by-election	Ruth Pushkin	109	1.1	4
1973 Hove by-election	Carole Reakes	128	0.3	5

=== February 1974 UK general election ===
constituency	candidate	votes	percentage	position
Battersea North	Carole Reakes	208	0.7	4
Birmingham Handsworth	S. Thompson	334	1.0	4
Brighton Kemptown	John Buckle	170	0.3	4
Lambeth Central	Ekins Denton Brome	107	0.4	5
Manchester Moss Side	Ruth Pushkin	206	0.6	4
Portsmouth South	A. D. Rifkin	394	0.7	4

=== October 1974 UK general election ===
constituency	candidate	votes	percentage	position
Battersea North	Carole Reakes	102	0.4	5
Birmingham Handsworth	J. L. Hutchinson	103	0.3	5
Brighton Kemptown	John Buckle	125	0.3	5
Bristol South East	P. Rowe	79	0.1	6
Cardiff South East	B. C. D. Harris	75	0.2	5
Lambeth Central	Peter John Bratton	88	0.3	5
Leicester South	G. H. Rousseau	136	0.3	5
Portsmouth South	A. D. Rifkin	612	1.2	4

- Source.

=== By-elections, 1974–1979 ===
election	candidate	votes	percentage	position
1978 Ilford North by-election	Carole Rowe	89	0.2	6
1978 Lambeth Central by-election	Stuart Munro	38	0.2	10

Rowe stood as East London Peoples Front, and Munro stood as South London Peoples Front.

== See also ==
- List of communist parties
- List of political parties in the United Kingdom
- Sino-Soviet split
- List of anti-revisionist groups
