= 1927 Brixton by-election =

UK parliamentary by-election

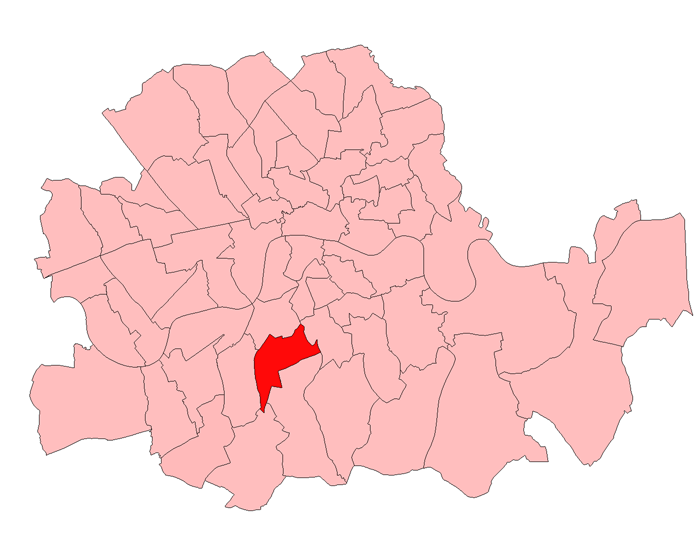
Brixton in London for 1927

The 1927 Brixton by-election was held on the 27 June 1927 following the elevation to the peerage of Davison Dalziel, he became Lord Dalziel of Wooler. The Conservative Party retained the seat with a reduced majority of 4,326.

== Candidates ==
- Nigel Colman, the Unionist Party candidate was a business man, a breeder and exhibitor of light horses and represented Brixton on the London County Council.
- Frederick Joseph Laverack was the Liberal Party candidate. He was a non-conformist lay preacher, who had represented Brixton between 1923 and 1924.
- James Adams was the Labour Party candidate, he was a member of the Shop Assistants' Union.

== Result ==
Brixton by-election, 1927
Party	Candidate	Votes	%	±%
Unionist	Nigel Colman	10,358	48.1	−8.5
Labour	James Adams	6,032	28.0	+2.1
Liberal	Frederick Joseph Laverack	5,134	23.9	+6.4
Majority		4,326	20.1	−10.6
Turnout		39,953	53.9	−15.5
Unionist hold		Swing	-5.3	

== See also ==
- List of United Kingdom by-elections (1918–1931)
