= Marcus Lipton =

British politician

Marcus Lipton CBE
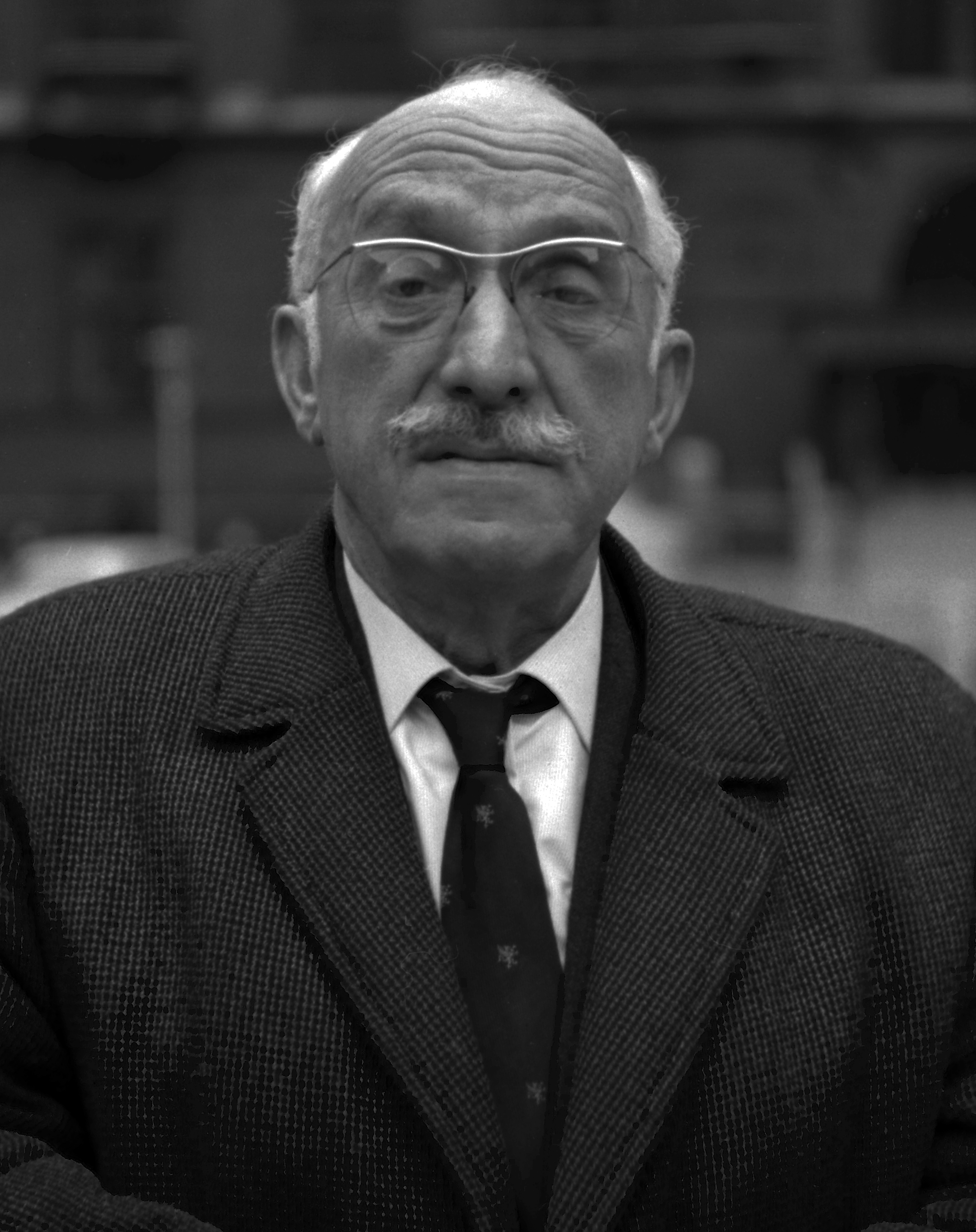
- Lipton in 1968

Member of Parliament for Lambeth Central Brixton (1945–1974)
- In office 5 July 1945 – 22 February 1978
- Preceded by: Constituency established
- Succeeded by: John Tilley

Personal details
- Born: 29 October 1900 Sunderland, County Durham, England
- Died: 22 February 1978 (aged 77) London, England
- Party: Labour
- Spouse: Fanny Olive Michaelson (m. 1928; div. 1965)
- Children: 1
- Education: Hudson Road Council School; Bede Grammar School
- Alma mater: Merton College, Oxford

Military service
- Allegiance: United Kingdom
- Branch/service: British Army
- Rank: Lieutenant colonel

Marcus Lipton CBE (29 October 1900 – 22 February 1978) was a British Labour Party politician.

== Education ==
The son of Benjamin and Mary Lipton of Sunderland, Marcus Lipton was educated at Hudson Road Council School and Bede Grammar School in the town, before winning a scholarship to Merton College, Oxford in 1919. He was supported by a Worshipful Company of Goldsmiths exhibition bursary. He graduated with a Second in Modern History in 1922 and then studied law and was called to the bar at Gray's Inn in 1926.

== Career ==
Lipton first entered politics in 1928 when he contested the London County Council elections as the Liberal Party candidate for the Stepney division of Mile End. In 1934 he was elected to Stepney Borough Council. He became an alderman of Lambeth Metropolitan Borough Council in 1937 serving until 1959. Shortly before the outbreak of the Second World War, Lipton enlisted as a private in a Territorial Army unit of the Royal Army Pay Corps. He was commissioned as an officer in the Army Educational Corps in 1941, rising to Lieutenant-Colonel by the end of the war in 1945.

He was elected as the Member of Parliament (MP) for Brixton in the 1945 general election, defeating the sitting Conservative Party MP Nigel Colman. He retained the seat at each subsequent election until it was abolished at the February 1974 general election. He was subsequently elected as MP for the successor seat of Lambeth Central, remaining in the Commons until his death.

== Parliamentary questions ==
Lipton was an active parliamentarian, known for putting topical and difficult questions to the executive. In October 1955, he used parliamentary privilege to question Prime Minister Anthony Eden about the alleged Third Man, Kim Philby. Philby threatened to sue Lipton if the allegation were made in public. After the Prime Minister cleared Philby of all suspicion in November, Lipton withdrew his comments. Subsequently, Philby was unmasked in 1963 as a Soviet spy. In 1964 Lipton brought up the case of the missing Lionel Crabb, again using parliamentary privilege.

After a CIA pilot flying in support of the 1954 Guatemalan coup d'état deliberately napalmed and destroyed the British cargo ship SS Springfjord, Lipton pursued successive Conservative and Labour Foreign Secretaries for the next 13 years over the UK's failure to obtain any compensation for the attack.

== Criticism of pop music ==
As a man of a different generation, Lipton in his last years was often critical of the form the pop and rock music industries had developed by the 1970s. On 2 June 1975, he criticised the "mass hysteria deliberately created by the promoters of pop concerts" following scenes at Bay City Rollers shows. Later, in response to the Sex Pistols' criticism of the British royal family, he argued that "if pop music is going to be used to destroy our established institutions, then it must be destroyed first".

Despite this controversy, he released a record himself, "Hand In Hand" back with "Friends In Need", on the Butterfly record label, a label related to Barry Class's Trend label. It was not a chart hit.

== Meeting with HMT Empire Windrush migrants ==
Following the arrival of 492 West Indian migrants in 1948, 242 were temporarily housed in Clapham Common tube station, a former air-raid shelter. Contrary to the later experiences of West Indian migrants to the United Kingdom, the 'Windrush men' were welcomed and subsequently invited to an event with a small party of local officials in nearby Brixton. Marcus Lipton, and Councillor Jack Simpson, Mayor of Lambeth, greeted the group at the Astoria Cinema with tea and cakes, followed by a free cinema showing. Lipton told the arrivals that they should see Britain as their second home, commenting: "When I heard of your coming here, I was moved. A journey like yours does not take place without good reason." Black civil rights leader and communist activist Billy Strachan was also present at this meeting, and used it to express his anger at the British government's attempts to scapegoat immigrants to hide their inability to solve the post-war housing crisis.

Reportedly, news of Lipton's generosity contributed to the migrants' boosted perception of the area, later influencing their decision to settle there: "In the unknown and perplexing vastness of England, the Jamaicans now felt they could be sure of one place. Brixton was friendly. In Brixton they would make their homes."

== Honours and legacy ==
In 1949 he was created an OBE, advanced to a CBE in 1965. In 1974 he was made an honorary freeman of the London Borough of Lambeth. In January 1978 he announced he would not stand for parliament again. He collapsed at his home in Holborn, London on 20 February 1978 and died two days later in Westminster Hospital.

A youth centre in Lambeth is named after him. He gave a tour of Parliament to a 13-year-old constituent in the 1950s, John Major, sparking a political ambition that led Major to becoming Conservative Prime Minister.

== Sources ==
- The Times House of Commons 1955. 1955.
- Leigh Rayment's Historical List of MPs

Parliament of the United Kingdom
Preceded by Nigel Colman	Member of Parliament for Brixton; 1945–Feb 1974	Constituency abolished
New constituency	Member of Parliament for Lambeth Central; Feb 1974–1978	Succeeded by John Tilley
