= Listed buildings in Audenshaw =

Audenshaw is a town in Tameside, Greater Manchester, England. The town contains eight listed buildings that are recorded in the National Heritage List for England. All the listed buildings are designated at Grade II, the lowest of the three grades, which is applied to "buildings of national importance and special interest". The listed buildings consist of houses, a farm building, a milestone, a church, a drinking trough, a former transformer pillar, and a war memorial.

== Buildings ==
Name and location	Photograph	Date	Notes
Barn west of Audenshaw Lodge; 53.46398°N 2.14076°W	—	Late 17th century	The barn is in brick on a stone plinth, with decorative brickwork, and has a stone-slate roof. It contains opposing cart and winnowing doors, elliptical-arched wagon entrances, mullioned windows, large 19th-century openings, three tiers of vents, and oculi in the gables.
Audenshaw Lodge; 53.46412°N 2.14041°W	—	1774	A brick house with an eaves cornice and a stone-slate roof. It has a double-depth plan, two storeys with attics, a symmetrical front of three bays, a two-bay 19th-century extension to the left, and a rear extension. The central bay protrudes slightly and contains a doorway with pilasters, a cornice, and a later Classical surround. The outer bays contain bow windows on the ground floor, on the upper floor are sash windows with keystones, and above in the centre bay is a dormer window.
Milestone; 53.47939°N 2.12394°W	—	Early 19th century	The milestone is in sandstone, and consists of a rectangular pillar about 1.5 metres (4 ft 11 in) tall. Its faces are inscribed with the distances in miles to Manchester and to Ashton-under-Lyne.
St Stephen's Church; 53.47499°N 2.11525°W		1845–46	A Commissioners' church designed by E. H. Shellard in Gothic Revival style, with the chancel added in 1900. It is in sandstone with a slate roof, and consists of a nave, north and south aisles, a chancel and a south vestry, and a west steeple. There are pinnacles on the corners, and the windows are lancets. The steeple has a five-stage tower with a west door, clock faces, gargoyles and a broach spire with lucarnes.
Ryecroft Hall; 53.47698°N 2.13026°W		c. 1860	A large house, later offices, in stone on a projecting plinth, with bands, a coped parapet, and a slate roof with gables and finials. The house has two storeys with attics, an L-shaped plan, an entrance front of four bays, and a right return of seven bays. The outer bays of the entrance front slightly project, and are gabled, one with a bay window, and the other with an oriel window. The porch is in the third bay and has a Tudor arched doorway, buttresses, and a pierced parapet. Most of the windows are mullioned and transomed with hood moulds.
Cattle and horse trough 53.47414°N 2.14224°W		1879	The drinking trough for animals is in polished Cornish granite. It is low and rectangular, containing two basins at different levels, and is set on two piers. On the front of the trough is an inscription.
Former transformer pillar 53.47415°N 2.14220°W		c. 1900	The circular cast iron pillar on a concrete base formerly housed a transformer. The exterior is divided into panels, some with inscriptions. At the top is a bead and reel band and a conical roof, and this is surmounted by a hexagonal lamp on a decorative spindle.
War memorial 53.46537°N 2.10991°W		1921	The war memorial is at the entrance to the cemetery. It consists of a stepped plinth and a tall pedestal on which stands the bronze figure of a soldier in battledress holding a gun. On the pedestal are inscriptions and the names of those lost.
