= Harry Norton Schofield =

Recipient of the Victoria Cross

Harry Norton Schofield VC
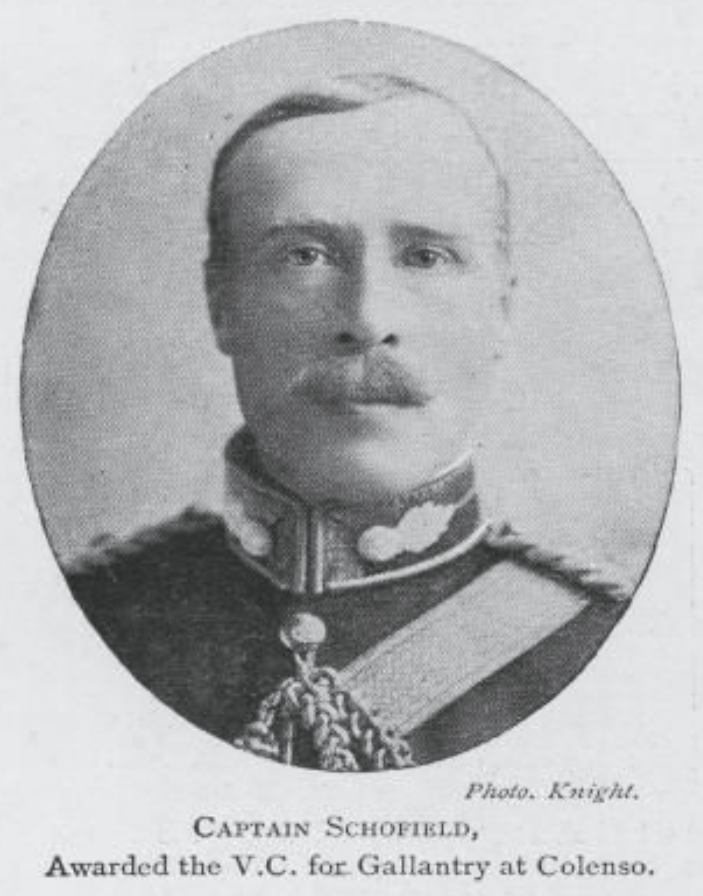
- Schofield in the Illustrated London News
- Born: 29 January 1865; Audenshaw, Manchester
- Died: 10 October 1931 (aged 66); Connaught Gardens, London
- Burial place: Putney Vale Cemetery; 51.439639°N 0.240789°W
- Military career
- Allegiance: United Kingdom
- Branch: British Army
- Service years: 1884–1905, 1914–1918
- Rank: Lieutenant-Colonel
- Units: Royal Field Artillery
- Conflicts: Second Boer War: Battle of Colenso; World War I
- Awards: Victoria Cross

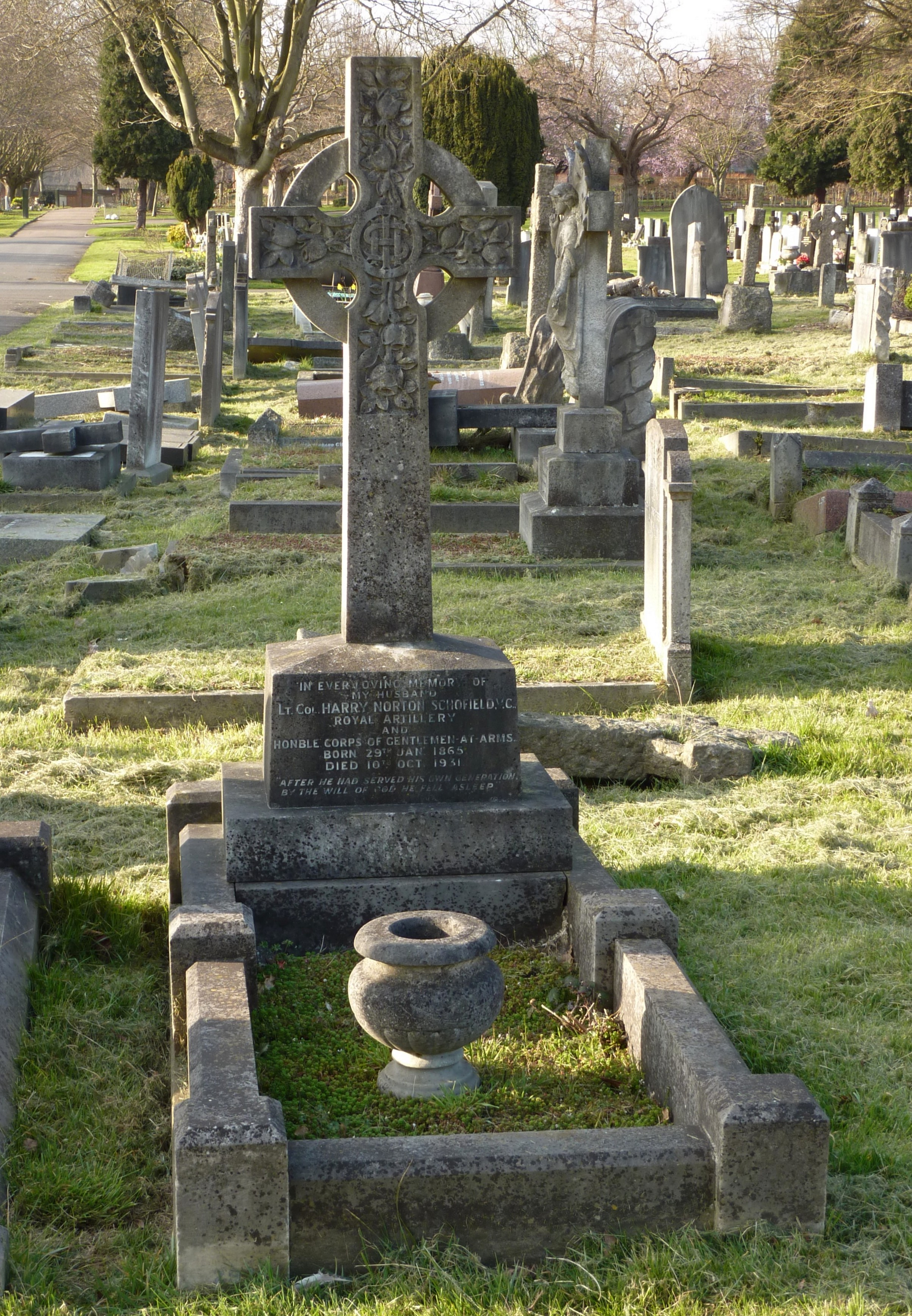
Schofield's grave at Putney Vale Cemetery, London, in 2015

Lieutenant-Colonel Harry Norton Schofield, VC (29 January 1865 – 10 October 1931) was an English British Army officer and recipient of the Victoria Cross, the highest and most prestigious award for gallantry in the face of the enemy that can be awarded to British and Commonwealth forces.

== Military career ==
Schofield was commissioned a lieutenant in the Royal Artillery on 15 February 1884, and promoted to captain on 1 February 1893. Following the outbreak of the Second Boer War he was posted to South Africa.

=== Details ===
Schofield was 34 years old, and a captain in the Royal Field Artillery during the Second Boer War when the following deed took place for which he was awarded the VC. On 15 December 1899, at the Battle of Colenso, South Africa, Captain Schofield with several others tried to save the guns of the 14th and 66th Batteries, Royal Field Artillery, when the detachments serving the guns had all become casualties or been driven from their guns by infantry fire at close range. Captain Schofield went out with two other officers (Walter Congreve and Frederick Roberts) and a corporal (George Nurse) when the first attempt was made to extricate the guns and helped in withdrawing the two that were saved. Schofield was initially awarded the Distinguished Service Order, but this was cancelled when he was subsequently upgraded to the VC, his citation reads:

At Colenso, on the 15th December, 1899, when the detachments serving the guns of the 14th and 66th Batteries, Royal Field Artillery, had all been killed, wounded, or driven from them by Infantry fire at close range, Captain Schofield went out when the first attempt was made to extricate the guns, and assisted in withdrawing the two that were saved.

Schofield received the medal from King Edward VII during an investiture at St. James's Palace on 29 October 1901.

He was promoted to major on 13 February 1900, and appointed aide-de-camp to Sir Redvers Buller, General Officer Commanding the Aldershot district. He retired from the Army in December 1905. He was, however, recalled to serve as a deputy assistant director of remounts in April 1906.

== Later life ==
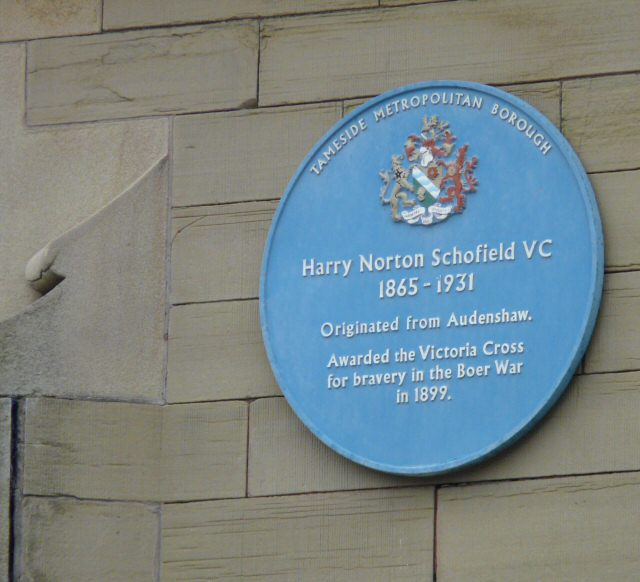
Blue plaque at Ryecroft Hall, Audenshaw

During the First World War Schofield rejoined the Army and served in a number of staff positions. He retired with the rank of lieutenant colonel.

He died on 10 October 1931 and is buried in Putney Vale Cemetery.
