= Evelyn Hubbard =

British businessman (1852–1934)

The Honourable Evelyn Hubbard (18 March 1852 – 24 August 1934) was a British businessman and Conservative politician.

== Life ==
He was the fifth son of John Gellibrand Hubbard (later Baron Addington), a director and governor of the Bank of England, and Member of Parliament for the City of London.

He was educated at Radley School and matriculated at Christ Church, Oxford in 1870, graduating B.A. in 1874, and M.A. in 1878. He entered the family business of John Hubbard & Co., Russia Merchants in 1875. He subsequently became the last governor of the Russia Company, a director of the Bank of England and a member of the lieutenancy commission for the City of London.

The family home was Addington in Buckinghamshire and when a vacancy occurred for the parliamentary constituency of North Buckinghamshire in 1889, he was chosen as the Conservative candidate. He failed to hold the seat for the Conservatives, and was defeated by his Liberal opponent, Edmund Hope Verney by 208 votes. Two years later there was another by-election in the constituency, and he again stood in the Conservative interest. He was again defeated, with the new Liberal MP increasing the majority to 381 votes.

In the meantime, Hubbard had moved to London, and in March 1892 he was elected an alderman on London County Council, as a member of the Conservative-backed Moderate Party. He held the seat until 1898.

In 1894 Hubbard was chosen to fight Plymouth at the next general election in 1895. Later that year the Conservative MP for Brixton, George Osborne succeeded to his father's title as Duke of Leeds. Hubbard was the selected to contest the resulting by-election by the Brixton Conservative Association. The by-election was held on 30 January 1896 and was elected as MP with a majority over his Radical opponent of 2,362 votes. He retired from the Commons in March 1900, on the advice of his doctors.

He was a great supporter of the National Society for the Prevention of Cruelty to Children, helping the society to gain its royal charter, and serving as its honorary treasurer.

He married Eveline Portal in 1881, and they had three sons. He died suddenly while on holiday at Harrogate, Yorkshire in August 1934, aged 82.

Parliament of the United Kingdom
Preceded by Marquess of Carmarthen	Member of Parliament for Brixton; 1896–1900	Succeeded by Sir Robert Mowbray
