= Davison Dalziel, 1st Baron Dalziel of Wooler =

British politician

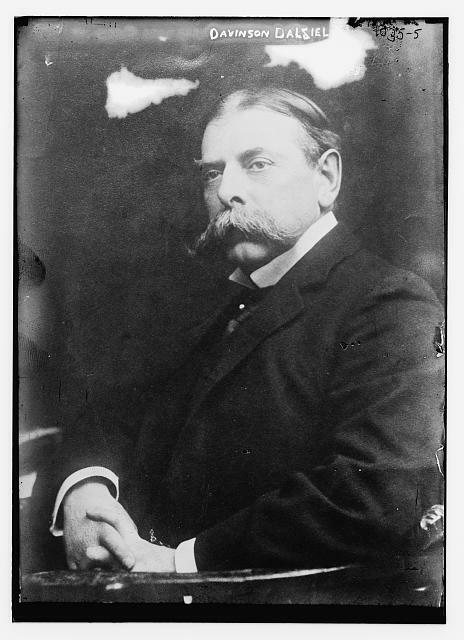
Dalziel

Davison Alexander Dalziel, 1st Baron Dalziel of Wooler (17 October 1852 – 18 April 1928), known as Sir Davison Dalziel, Bt, between 1919 and 1928, was a British newspaper owner and Conservative Party politician. He sat in the House of Commons between 1910 and 1927, before a brief period in the House of Lords. He was the founder of Dalziel's News Agency.

== Early life ==
Dalziel was born in London on 17 October 1852.

== Career ==
Dalziel moved to New South Wales to work as a journalist for the Sydney Echo. He also spent several years in the United States in the management department of various newspapers, and when he returned to England in 1890 he set up his own business, Dalziel's News Agency. With partners he bought controlling stakes in The Standard and Evening Standard newspapers in 1910. He sold off his newspaper interests to further his work in the cab industry, setting up several companies including General Motor Cab Company Ltd, the Pullman Car Company and the International Sleeping Car Share Trust Ltd.

=== Political career ===
At the January 1910 general election he was elected as the Member of Parliament (MP) for Brixton, holding the seat until his defeat at the 1923 general election. He was created a baronet in 1919.

He regained the Brixton seat in 1924, and held it for a further three years until his resignation from the House of Commons on 9 June 1927, by taking the Chiltern Hundreds

In the 1927 Birthday Honours he was raised to the peerage as Baron Dalziel of Wooler, of Wooler in the County of Northumberland.

== Personal life ==
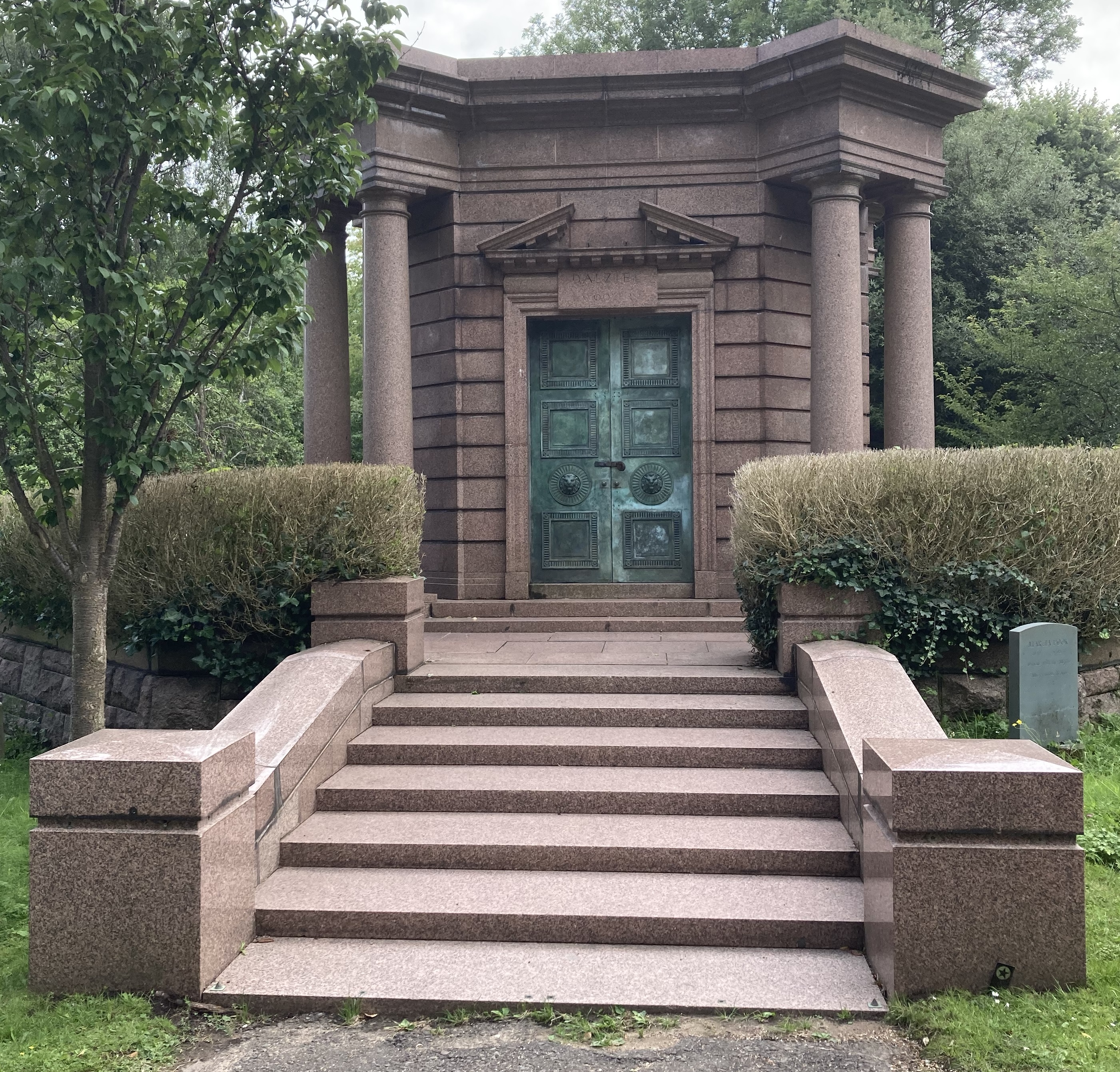
Mausoleum of Lord Dalziel of Wooler in Highgate Cemetery

In 1876 in Sydney, Dalziel was married to actress Harriet Sarah "Dickie" Lingard. Together, they were the parents of:

- Alice Helen Dalziel (1876–1910), who married René Nagelmackers, son of Georges Nagelmackers, founder of Compagnie Internationale des Wagons-Lits and creator of the Orient Express. After her death, he married Gloria Monés-Maury, sister of Pedro Monés, Marquess of Casa Maury.

Dalziel died on 18 April 1928, aged 75, when the baronetcy and barony became extinct. In his will, which was only 140 words long, he left over £2,250,000 to Lady Dalziel, who herself died on 7 December 1938.

He is buried in a family mausoleum in the eastern section of Highgate Cemetery in north London, close to the main entrance.

Parliament of the United Kingdom
Preceded by Joel Seaverns	Member of Parliament for Brixton; January 1910 – 1923	Succeeded by Frederick Joseph Laverack
Preceded by Frederick Joseph Laverack	Member of Parliament for Brixton; 1924 – 1927	Succeeded by Nigel Colman
Peerage of the United Kingdom
New creation	Baron Dalziel of Wooler; 1927–1928	Extinct
Baronetage of the United Kingdom
New creation	Baronet (of Grosvenor Place); 1919–1928	Extinct
