= Joel Seaverns =

Joel Herbert Seaverns (13 November 1860 – 11 November 1923) was an American businessman who spent much of his life in the United Kingdom where he was a Liberal Party Member of Parliament (MP).

== Early life ==
He was the only son of Dr Joel Seaverns and Jane née Swain of Boston, Massachusetts. Seaverns graduated magna cum laude from Harvard University with a Bachelor of Arts degree in 1881.

== Move to England ==
He became a partner in the firm of Messrs Henry W Peabody & Co, foreign and colonial merchants. He moved to England in 1884 to run the company's office at Eastcheap in the City of London. He took up residence in the south London suburb of Upper Norwood, later moving to Westminster and Kemsing, Kent. He was appointed a magistrate for the County of London and was a founding member of the County of London Territorial Force Association, and the joint committee of the London National Reserve. He held the office of vice-president of the National Association of Shop Assistants.

== Family ==
Seaverns married Helen Gertrude Brown, daughter of artist Harrison Bird Brown in Portland, Maine, 30 April 1892. Their only son, Lieutenant Joel Harrison Seaverns of the 1/1st London Regiment, was killed in action during the First World War in May 1915. They adopted James Morgan Fowler, the orphaned son of James Fowler of Adelaide, South Australia.

== Politics ==
In October 1902 Seaverns was unanimously adopted as a prospective parliamentary candidate by Brixton Liberal Association in opposition to the sitting Conservative MP, Sir Robert Mowbray. By the time the election was called Mowbray had decided to retire, and his Conservative opponent was instead Davison Dalziel. Seaverns won the seat by the small majority of 286 votes, becoming the first American born graduate of Harvard University to hold a seat in the House of Commons. In July 1909 his health declined, and he went to Switzerland for a course of treatment. Although his health improved, he was absent from the country prior to the January 1910 general election. He again faced Davison Dalziel, who defeated him by a margin of 1,038 votes. He attempted to regain the seat when a further election was held in December 1910 but Dalziel held the seat by the slightly larger majority of 1,068 votes

He made an unsuccessful attempt to re-enter parliament at the 1922 general election when he stood at Gainsborough.

== Death ==
He died at Brighton of septicaemia in November 1923 after a short illness and was cremated at Golders Green. Under the terms of his will, a charitable trust was established to provide for "the education, care, maintenance, support or benefit of such young people of any class of society whether infants or adults and being either poor orphans or the children of poor people as the trustees may from time to time select".

Parliament of the United Kingdom
Preceded by Sir Robert Mowbray	Member of Parliament for Lambeth, Brixton; 1906 – 1910	Succeeded by Davison Dalziel
