= Michael Chant =

English composer and political activist

Michael Chant is an English composer and political activist. Born in 1945, he became politically active in the 1960s while associated with another composer, Cornelius Cardew.

Chant became a member of the Communist Party of England (Marxist-Leninist) and remains active in the Revolutionary Communist Party of Britain (Marxist-Leninist) and is also an active trade unionist. His musical work has continued to focus on political issues, as did his original work with the Scratch Orchestra, an experimental performing ensemble.

He is currently living and working in Plymouth, England.
