= John Tilley (Labour politician) =

British politician (1941–2005)

John Vincent Tilley (13 June 1941 — 18 December 2005) was a British Labour politician.

== Early life ==
Tilley was born in Derby on 13 June 1941. He was educated at The Bemrose School, a state grammar school, before going on to read history at Trinity Hall, Cambridge.

== Career ==
Tilley subsequently became a journalist at the Newcastle Journal, before moving to London as industrial, and later diplomatic, correspondent of The Scotsman.

In 1971, Tilley was elected to Wandsworth Council, where he became council leader. He was selected as Labour candidate to fight Kensington in the February 1974 and October 1974 elections, with improving results but no success. The party chose him to defend its long-standing high majority at a by-election in Lambeth Central in 1978, which he won. The election was triggered by the death of Labour MP Marcus Lipton. In Parliament, Tilley served on Labour's opposition front bench, resigning in 1982 in opposition to the Party leadership's stand on the Falklands War.

As MP for the Brixton area, he worked with Lord Scarman after the 1981 Brixton Riots for a better understanding of local social problems. He proposed a bill to amend the Sexual Offences (Amendment) Act 1976 to make rape in marriage illegal in 1983.

Tilley was a founding member of the Socialist Campaign Group in 1982, but his constituency seat was abolished for the 1983 election and he was selected to fight Southwark and Bermondsey instead. The seat had been safe for Labour, but Simon Hughes had won the constituency for the Liberal Party in a by-election earlier that year, and Hughes kept the seat at the general election. Tilley never returned to Parliament.

He subsequently worked as chief economic adviser to the London Borough of Hackney and spent 11 years as parliamentary secretary to the Co-operative Union. From 2000 to 2002, he headed the parliamentary office of the Co-operative Group. An active co-operator, he wrote Churchill's Favourite Socialist: A Life of AV Alexander, a biography of an earlier co-operative activist and member of parliament, created a peer for his life work, A. V. Alexander, 1st Earl Alexander of Hillsborough.

== Personal life and death ==
Tilley's first marriage ended in divorce, after a daughter, Cleo. He married again in 1982 to Kathryn Riley, a Brixton teacher and Labour activist, later professor at the Institute of Education, University of London. They had a daughter, Jo. Tilley died of cancer on 18 December 2005.

Parliament of the United Kingdom
Preceded by Marcus Lipton	Member of Parliament for Lambeth Central; 1978 – 1983	Constituency abolished
