= Lambeth Central (UK Parliament constituency) =

UK Parliament constituency (1974–1983)

- Former borough constituency for the House of Commons
- Boundary of Lambeth Central in Greater London for the 1974 general election
- County: Greater London

1974–1983
- Seats: One
- Created from: Brixton and Clapham
- Replaced by: Vauxhall, Streatham and Norwood

Lambeth Central was a parliamentary constituency in the London Borough of Lambeth, in South London. It returned one Member of Parliament (MP) to the House of Commons of the UK Parliament (using first-past-the-post voting).

The seat, centred on Clapham, was created for the February 1974 general election, and abolished for the 1983 general election, when most of its territory was transferred to the redrawn Vauxhall constituency.

== History ==
This short-lived seat is best known in the news media for the by-election of 1978. This was controversial because of a high-profile campaign by the National Front in one of the most racially diverse constituencies in the UK; the party fielded a candidate in the following general election also. On both occasions the candidates lost their deposits for want of votes.

The constituency shared boundaries with the Lambeth Central electoral division for election of councillors to the Greater London Council at elections in 1973, 1977 and 1981.

== Boundaries ==
Map of boundaries 1974–1983

The London Borough of Lambeth wards of Angell, Clapham Town, Ferndale, Larkhall, and Town Hall.

== Members of Parliament ==
Election	Member	Party	Notes
Feb 1974	Marcus Lipton	Labour	Died February 1978
1978 by-election	John Tilley	Labour	Contested Southwark and Bermondsey following redistribution
1983	constituency abolished: see Vauxhall, Streatham and Norwood		

== Elections ==
1970 notional result
Party	Vote	%
Labour	16,300	55.3
Conservative	13,200	44.7
Turnout	29,500	56.7
Electorate	52,022	

General election February 1974: Lambeth Central
Party	Candidate	Votes	%	±%
Labour	Marcus Lipton	15,954	52.8	–2.4
Conservative	Chris Patten	8,585	28.4	–16.3
Liberal	Eric Thwaites	5,226	17.3	New
Workers Revolutionary	Sylvester Smart	337	1.1	New
Marxist-Leninist (England)	Ekins Brome	107	0.4	New
Majority		7,369	24.4	+13.9
Turnout		30,209	62.3	+5.6
Registered electors		48,510		
Labour hold		Swing	+6.9	

General election October 1974: Lambeth Central
Party	Candidate	Votes	%	±%
Labour	Marcus Lipton	15,381	60.0	+7.2
Conservative	Nicholas Lyell	6,704	26.2	–2.2
Liberal	Peter Easton	3,211	12.5	–4.8
Workers Revolutionary	Sylvester Smart	233	0.9	–0.2
Marxist-Leninist (England)	Peter Bratton	88	0.3	–0.0
Majority		8,677	33.9	+9.5
Turnout		25,617	52.6	–9.7
Registered electors		48,716		
Labour hold		Swing	+4.7	

1978 Lambeth Central by-election: Lambeth Central
Party	Candidate	Votes	%	±%
Labour Co-op	John Tilley	10,311	49.5	–10.6
Conservative	Jeremy Hanley	7,170	34.4	+8.2
National Front	Helena Steven	1,291	6.2	New
Liberal	David Blunt	1,104	1.4	–7.2
Socialist Unity	John Chase	287	1.4	New
Workers Revolutionary	Corin Redgrave	271	1.3	+0.4
Socialist Workers	Anthony Bogues	201	1.0	New
Socialist (GB)	Barry Kenneth	91	0.4	New
Homes, Employment, Anti-Racial Discrimination	Alan Whereat	55	0.3	New
South London People's Front	Stuart Monro	38	0.2	New
Democratic Monarchist Public Safety White Resident	Bill Boaks	27	0.1	New
Majority		3,141	15.1	–18.8
Turnout		20,846	44.5	–8.1
Registered electors		46,826		
Labour Co-op hold		Swing	–9.4	

General election 1979: Lambeth Central
Party	Candidate	Votes	%	±%
Labour Co-op	John Tilley	15,101	54.7	–5.3
Conservative	Jeremy Hanley	9,125	33.1	+6.9
Liberal	David Blunt	2,339	8.5	–4.1
National Front	Vera Lillington	830	3.0	N/A
Workers Revolutionary	Corin Redgrave	152	0.6	–0.4
Independent	Alan Whereat	50	0.2	N/A
Majority		5,976	21.7	–12.2
Turnout		27,597	63.2	+10.6
Registered electors		43,678		
Labour Co-op hold		Swing	–6.1	
