= Ryecroft Hall =

Listed building in Greater Manchester, England

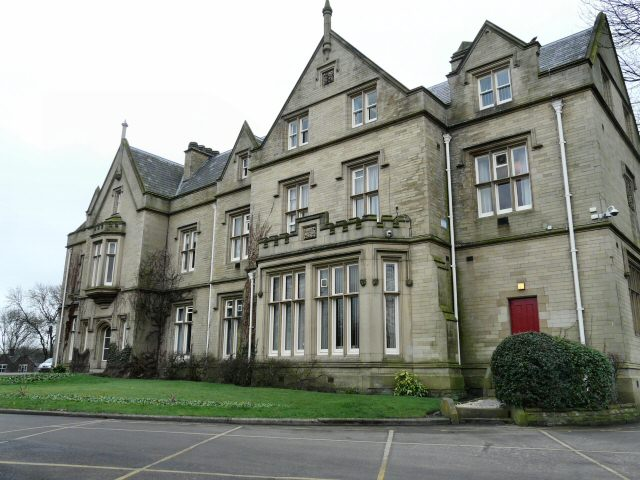

General information
- Location: Audenshaw, Tameside, Greater Manchester, England
- Address: Manchester Road
- Coordinates: 53.4770°N 2.1303°W
- Completed: 1849
- Client: James Smith Buckley
- Owner: Tameside Council
- Designations

Listed Building – Grade II
- Official name: Ryecroft Hall
- Designated: 31 May 1966
- Reference no.: 1067967

Website
- Official website

Ryecroft Hall is a Grade II listed building in Audenshaw, Tameside, Greater Manchester, England. Originally a home to several prominent local residents, the hall was ultimately donated to the people of Audenshaw by Austin Hopkinson in 1922 and still serves the local community to the present day.

== History ==
The land that Ryecroft Hall sits on was once owned by the Earl of Stamford and Warrington and was sold to prominent mill owner James Smith Buckley. Upon his death in 1885, the house was passed to his nephew Abel Buckley, the same year he became MP for Prestwich, living there until his death in 1908. Ryecroft Hall would ultimately be sold to Austin Hopkinson in 1913.

During World War I, the hall was used as a voluntary hospital with over 100 beds. Hopkinson subsequently donated the hall to the people of Audenshaw in 1920.

== Present day ==
Audenshaw council would ultimately be subsumed by Tameside Council who currently own the hall which is used by the local community. As a testament to its history there are two blue plaques on the side of the building. One is for Hopkinson who donated the hall and the other is for Harry Norton Schofield (1865–1931) who was born in Audenshaw and was awarded the Victoria Cross in the Boer War.

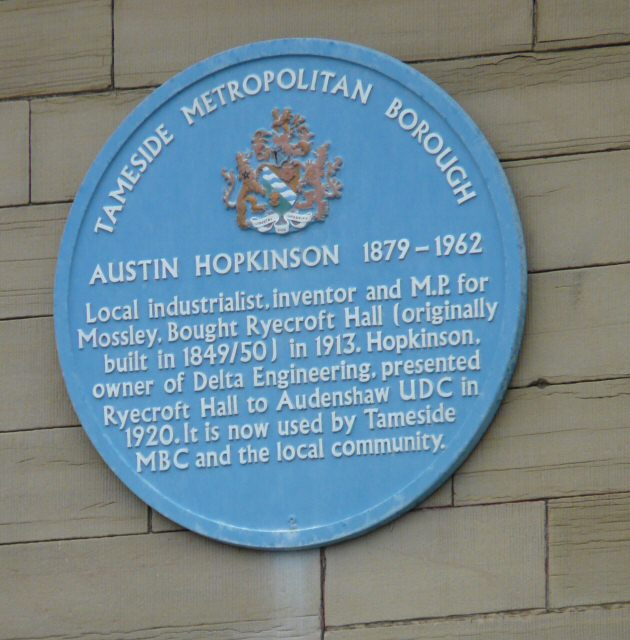
Blue plaque for Austin Hopkinson

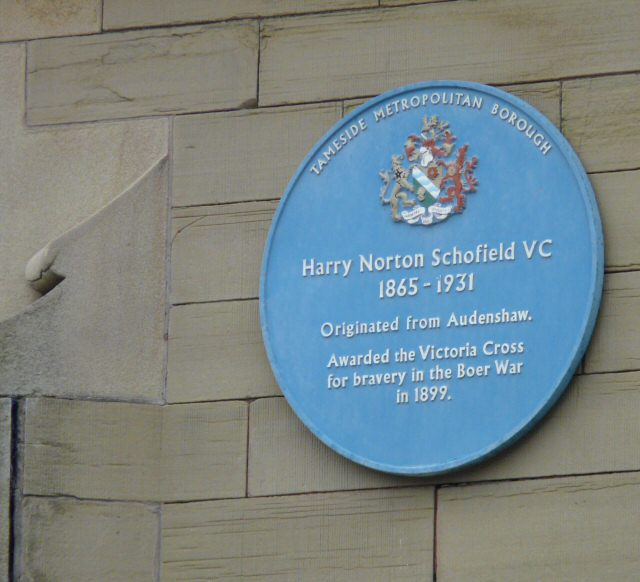
Blue plaque for Harry Norton Schofield

== See also ==
- Listed buildings in Audenshaw
- Listed buildings in Greater Manchester
