= Nigel Colman (politician) =

British politician (1886–1966)

Sir Nigel Claudian Dalziel Colman, 1st Baronet (4 May 1886 – 7 March 1966) was a British businessman and Conservative Party politician.

== Early life ==
The second son of Frederick Edward Colman and his wife, Helen, eldest daughter of Davison Octavius Dalziel, he was born at Carlyle House, Chelsea Embankment, London. His father was a prominent industrialist and chairman of J and J Colman, and Nigel later became a director of Reckitt and Colman.

Colman served in the Royal Navy during the First World War later transferring to the Royal Air Force where he left as a captain.

== Horses and dogs ==
Colman was an enthusiastic breeder and exhibitor of harness horses and dogs. He was president of the National Horse Association of Great Britain from 1939 to 1945; and of the Hackney Horse Society in 1923 and 1938, and chairman of the British Horse Society from 1952 –1955. The latter society awarded him its medal of honour in 1953. He was also a committee member of the Kennel Club.

== Politics ==
Politically a Conservative, in 1925 Colman was elected to the London County Council representing Brixton as a member of the majority Conservative-backed Municipal Reform Party. Two years later his uncle, Sir Davison Dalziel, Conservative MP for Brixton was raised to the peerage. This created a vacancy, and Colman was elected to the House of Commons in the ensuing by-election. He was re-elected on three occasions, before losing to Marcus Lipton of the Labour Party, when that party won a landslide victory at the 1945 general election.

== Life after parliament ==
Although no longer a member of parliament, Colman continued to be active in the Conservative Party. He served as chairman of the Executive Committee of the National Union of Conservative and Unionist Associations from 1945 – 1951 and president of the London Conservative Union 1952 – 1959.

Escutcheon of the Colman baronets of Reigate

In January 1952 he was created a baronet "of Reigate in the County of Surrey" for political and public services. On 30 July of the same year he married Nona Ann Willan. The couple had no children, and the baronetcy became extinct on his death at his Grosvenor Square, London home in March 1966. He is buried in the churchyard of St John the Evangelist Church in Wotton, Surrey.

Parliament of the United Kingdom
Preceded by Davison Alexander Dalziel	Member of Parliament for Lambeth, Brixton; 1927 – 1945	Succeeded by Marcus Lipton
Baronetage of the United Kingdom
New creation	Baronet (of Reigate in the County of Surrey); 1952 – 1966	Extinct
