= Lady Camilla Osborne =

Daughter of the 11th Duke of Leeds

- Born: Camilla Dorothy Godolphin Osborne; 14 August 1950 (age 75)
- Noble family: Osborne
- Spouses: Julian Brownlow Harris (divorced) Nigel Dempster (m. 1977; div. 2002)
- Issue: Emily Kate Godolphin Harris; Louisa Beatrix Dempster
- Father: The 11th Duke of Leeds
- Mother: Audrey Young

Lady Camilla Dorothy Godolphin Osborne (formerly Harris and Dempster; born 14 August 1950) is an English heiress. She is the only child of the 11th Duke of Leeds.

== Early life and family ==
Lady Camilla Osborne was born on 14 August 1950 to John Osborne, 11th Duke of Leeds, and his second wife, Audrey Young. She grew up in Jersey, where her parents moved to avoid heavy taxes.

Her parents divorced in 1955 after her mother had an affair with a Guards officer. Her mother later remarried to Sir David Roland Walter Lawrence, 3rd Baronet.

Her father married a third time in 1955 to Caroline Fleur Vatcher.

In 1963, at age 13, Osborne's father died without male issue. Due to the entail limiting the peerages to males only, she could not inherit her father's titles. The titles of her father passed to his cousin Sir D'Arcy Osborne, making him the 12th Duke of Leeds. When D'Arcy Osborne died in 1964 without issue, the Dukedom of Leeds and all the other peerages became extinct.

While she was not able to inherit the dukedom from her father, she did inherit money from his personal estate upon his death along with an annual allowance. In 1971 she inherited £1,000,000 (equivalent to £12,970,000 in 2016) from the family trust.

Osborne studied philosophy and English at Newcastle University, but left after a year.

== Personal life ==
Osborne married Julian Brownlow Harris and in 1972 gave birth to a daughter. The couple later divorced. In 1975 she became engaged to Christopher Moorsom, but later called off the engagement.

She married a second time to Nigel Richard Patton Dempster in 1977 at the Chelsea Register Office. The couple spent the first years of their marriage living separately. She gave birth to another daughter, in 1979. The marriage was dissolved in 2002. Nigel Dempster and Lady Camilla remained close after their divorce. Dempster died on 12 July 2007. Osborne was present at his funeral.

She stated that she believed her father, having sold the family estate Hornby Castle, lived an unhappy life without purpose.

In 2004, she sold a painting by William Oram that had been painted for one of the Dukes of Leeds.

Osborne was featured in the BBC Two documentary The Last Dukes.
