= John Osborne, 11th Duke of Leeds =

British peer

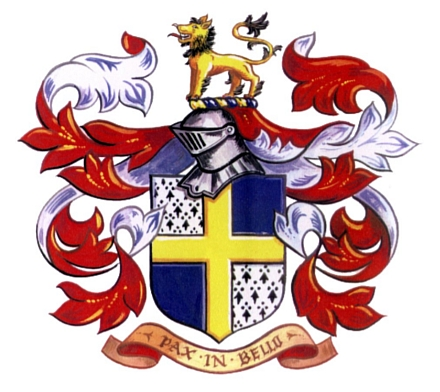
- Ancestral arms of the Osborne family, Dukes of Leeds
- Born: 12 March 1901
- Died: 26 July 1963 (aged 62)
- Spouse(s): Irma de Malkhazouny (m. 1933; div. 1948) Audrey Young (m. 1948; div. 1955) Caroline Vatcher (m. 1955)
- Children: Lady Camilla Osborne
- Father: George Osborne
- Relatives: George Osborne (grandfather); George Lambton (grandfather)

John Francis Godolphin Osborne, 11th Duke of Leeds (12 March 1901 – 26 July 1963) was a British peer.

== Biography ==
He was the son of George Godolphin Osborne, 10th Duke of Leeds and Lady Katherine Frances Lambton. He succeeded to the title of 11th Duke of Leeds and its subsidiary titles on 10 May 1927.

He inherited half a million pounds after tax from his father at the age of twenty-six in 1927, but his father also left gambling debts. Hornby Castle estate was placed on the market in 1930. The Duke spent the rest of his life as a tax exile on the French Riviera, and on the island of Jersey at his mansion Melbourne House. Hornby Castle, bar one gutted wing, was demolished in 1931.

Bibulous and self-centred, he had no interest in living up to his title, and dissipated much of the family's remaining wealth, although enough remained for his sole child Lady Camilla to inherit, in addition to an allowance, £1,000,000 (equivalent to £17,850,000 in 2023) lump sum from the family trust in 1971.

In 1961 he sold Francisco Goya's Portrait of the Duke of Wellington at auction for £140,000 (equivalent to £3,420,000 in 2023). It was taken from the National Gallery later that year by Kempton Bunton who unsuccessfully tried to hold it for ransom.

== Family ==
The Duke was married three times:

- firstly, to Serbian ballet dancer Irma Amelia de Malkhazouny, on 27 March 1933 (marriage dissolved in 1948 without issue);
- secondly, to Audrey Young, on 21 December 1948 (marriage dissolved in 1955), with whom he had one daughter, Lady Camilla Dorothy Godolphin Osborne (born 14 August 1950), who married firstly Julian Brownlow Harris (marriage dissolved) and secondly, in 1977, Nigel Richard Patton Dempster (marriage dissolved in 2002);
- thirdly, to Caroline Fleur Vatcher (1931–2005), daughter of Colonel Henry Monckton Vatcher of Jersey, on 22 February 1955, who survived him.

Since the 11th Duke died without male issue, his titles passed to his cousin D'Arcy Osborne, 12th Duke of Leeds, the last holder of these titles when the lineage became extinct.

== Ancestry ==
Ancestors of John Osborne, 11th Duke of Leeds

16. Francis Osborne, 1st Baron Godolphin
8. George Osborne, 8th Duke of Leeds
17. The Hon. Elizabeth Eden
4. George Osborne, 9th Duke of Leeds
18. Granville Leveson-Gower, 1st Earl Granville
9. Harriette Stewart
19. Lady Henrietta Spencer
2. George Osborne, 10th Duke of Leeds
20. Horace Pitt-Rivers, 3rd Baron Rivers
10. George Pitt-Rivers, 4th Baron Rivers
21. Frances Rigby
5. The Hon. Frances Pitt-Rivers
22. Granville Leveson-Gower, 1st Earl Granville (= 18.)
11. Lady Susanna Leveson-Gower
23. Lady Harriet Cavendish
1. John Osborne, 11th Duke of Leeds
24. William Lambton
12. John Lambton, 1st Earl of Durham
25. Lady Anne Villiers
6. George Lambton, 2nd Earl of Durham
26. Charles Grey, 2nd Earl Grey
13. Lady Louisa Grey
27. The Hon. Mary Ponsonby
3. Lady Katherine Lambton
28. James Hamilton, Viscount Hamilton
14. James Hamilton, 1st Duke of Abercorn
29. Lady Harriet Douglas
7. Lady Beatrix Hamilton
30. John Russell, 6th Duke of Bedford
15. Lady Louisa Russell
31. Lady Georgiana Gordon

Peerage of England
Preceded by George Osborne	Duke of Leeds; 1927–1963	Succeeded by D'Arcy Osborne
Peerage of the United Kingdom
Preceded by George Osborne	Baron Godolphin; 1927–1963	Extinct
