= Caroline Osborne, Duchess of Leeds =

British painter and the last Duchess of Leeds

Caroline Osborne
- Duchess of Leeds (1955–1968); Lady Hobart (1975–2005)
- Caroline, Duchess of Leeds, 1957
- Born: Caroline Fleur Vatcher; 18 May 1931; Bailiwick of Jersey
- Died: 16 July 2005 (aged 74); London, England
- Noble family: Osborne (by marriage); Hobart (by marriage)
- Spouses: John Osborne, 11th Duke of Leeds (m. 1955; died 1963) Peter Hoos (m. 1968; div. 1975) Sir Robert Hampden Hobart, 3rd Baronet (m. 1975; died 1988)
- Father: Henry Monckton Vatcher
- Mother: Beryl Methwold Walrond
- Occupation: Artist

Caroline Fleur Osborne, Duchess of Leeds, later Caroline Hobart, Lady Hobart, (née Vatcher; 18 May 1931 – 16 July 2005) was a British portraitist and landscape painter. As the third wife of John Osborne, 11th Duke of Leeds, she was the last Duchess of Leeds. She was known professionally as Caroline Leeds.

== Early life and family ==
Caroline Fleur Vatcher was born on 18 May 1931 in Jersey. She was the daughter of Colonel Henry Monckton Vatcher MC, who served as a jurat in the Judiciary of Jersey, and Beryl Methwold Walrond, a granddaughter of Henry Walrond, 9th Marquis de Vallado and great-granddaughter of James St Clair-Erskine, 2nd Earl of Rosslyn. Through her mother she is a descendant of Humphrey Walrond, who served as the deputy governor of Barbados.

As a child, Caroline and her parents had to be evacuated from Jersey during World War II. She was presented at court as a debutante in the late 1940s.

== Artistic career ==
Caroline studied oil painting, watercolor painting, and chalk drawing under Philip Lambe and Bernard Adams. She focused on landscapes and portraits, often painting Gers and other departments of France, as well as Falkland war heroes and members of the British royal family. Her portraiture collection included paintings of Prince Andrew, Duke of York, Cristina Ford, and the Duke and Duchess of Bedford. Her work was presented in exhibitions in London, including at the Royal Society of Portrait Painters, the Royal Institute of Oil Painters, the Royal Society of British Artists, and in commercial galleries in London, Lectoure, Paris, New York City, and Monte Carlo. Her last exhibition, a few weeks before her death, was held at Campbell's of London. Some of her portraits are on display at the Royal Hospital, Chelsea.

After her death, the Museo d'Arte di Chianciano Terme in Tuscany added a selection of her artwork to its permanent collection, in the Historical Europe wing.

== Personal life ==
Caroline married John Osborne, 11th Duke of Leeds on 22 February 1955, becoming the Duchess of Leeds. She was the duke's third wife, as he had been previously married to Irma de Malkhazouny and Audrey Young. Through this marriage, she became the stepmother of Lady Camilla Osborne, the duke's only child. Her husband died on 26 July 1963. As her husband had no sons, the Dukedom of Leeds went to his cousin Sir D'Arcy Osborne. The twelfth duke, who remained unmarried, died in 1964 without any male heirs and the Dukedom went extinct. As such, Caroline was the last Duchess of Leeds.

She married secondly on 30 March 1968 to Peter Hendrik Peregrine Hoos, a grandson of Adelbert Salusbury Cockayne-Cust, 5th Baron Brownlow. The marriage was an unhappy one and the couple divorced in 1975. Later that year she married for a third time to Sir Robert Hampden Hobart, 3rd Baronet. Upon her marriage she became Lady Hobart.

She died on 16 July 2005.
