= Audenshaw =

Town in Greater Manchester, England

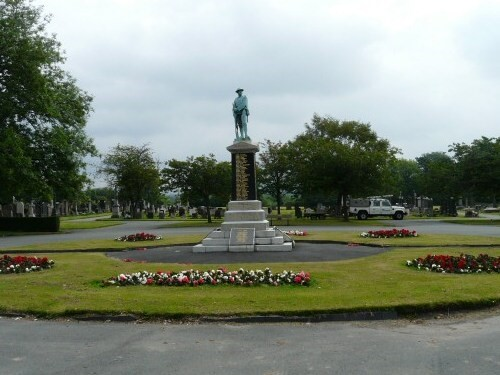
- Audenshaw Cemetery

- Location within Greater Manchester
- Population: 11,419 (2011)
- OS grid reference: SJ925975
  - London: 160 mi (257 km) SSE
- Metropolitan borough: Tameside
- Metropolitan county: Greater Manchester
- Region: North West
- Country: England
- Sovereign state: United Kingdom
- Post town: MANCHESTER
- Postcode district: M34
- Dialling code: 0161
- Police: Greater Manchester
- Fire: Greater Manchester
- Ambulance: North West
- UK Parliament: Ashton-under-Lyne

Audenshaw is a town in Tameside, Greater Manchester, England. It lies east of Gorton, in the City of Manchester, and 4.9 miles (7.9 km) east of Manchester city centre. Historically part of Lancashire, in 2011 it had a population of 11,419.

The name derives from Aldwin, a Saxon personal name, and the Old English suffix shagh meaning "Woodland". Nico Ditch, an early-medieval linear earthwork possibly built as a defensive barrier against Vikings, runs through the area. Medieval Audenshaw was a division of the township of Ashton in the county of Lancashire. Audenshaw expanded as a centre for textile manufacture during the Industrial Revolution and the Victorian era with inhabitants employed in hat-making, cotton-spinning, calico-printing, and silk-weaving. In 1974, Audenshaw Urban District became part of the Metropolitan Borough of Tameside.

== History ==
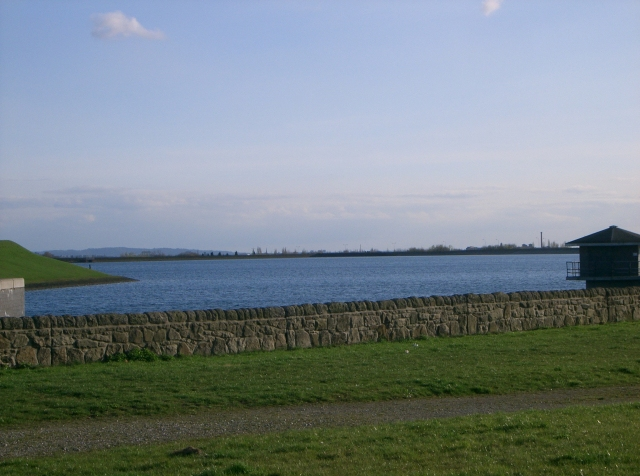
Audenshaw Reservoir

The name Audenshaw is a corruption of its earlier name Aldwinshagh which derives from Aldwin, a Saxon personal name, combined with the Old English suffix shagh meaning "Woodland".

Nico Ditch, a medieval linear earthwork, runs through the area. Stretching 6 miles (9.7 km) from Ashton Moss in the east to just east of Stretford in the west, the origin of the ditch is unclear. According to legend, it was completed in a single night by the inhabitants of Manchester, as a protection against Viking invaders in 869–870, and that it was the site of a bloody battle between Saxons and Danes and that Gorton and Reddish got their name from the battle, "Gore Town" and "Red-Ditch". Despite the legend, the U-shape of the ditch – as opposed to the usual V-shape of military earthworks – and the absence of an associated bank indicates that Nico Ditch was probably a boundary marker. Although it is thought to be earlier, the earliest documented reference to Nico Ditch is in a charter detailing the granting of land in Audenshaw to the monks of the Kersal Cell. In the document, dating from 1190 to 1212, the ditch is referred to as "Mykelldiche", and a magnum fossatum, Latin for "large ditch".

In 1877, part of the original village of Audenshaw was demolished to make way for the three Audenshaw Reservoirs. Also destroyed to allow the construction of the reservoirs was a section of Nico Ditch.

== Governance ==
The coat of arms of the former Audenshaw Urban District Council, which was granted by the College of Arms in 1950. The arms are emblematic of Audenshaw's history and geography, incorporating in its design references to industry.

During the Early Middle Ages Audenshaw is supposed to have been a thanage held by Saxons, but following the Norman conquest of England fell within the historic county boundaries of Lancashire, and noted as a division of Ashton, an ancient township and parish within the hundred of Salford. The division of Audenshaw spanned the village of Audenshaw, and the outlying settlements of Danehead, Hooleyhill, Littlemoss, North-street, Walkmill, Waterhouses and Woodhouses. This arrangement persisted until the creation of Audenshaw's first local authority, a local board of health in 1870. Audenshaw Local Board of Health was a regulatory body responsible for standards of hygiene and sanitation in the locality. Under the Local Government Act 1894, the area of the local board became the Audenshaw Urban District, a local government district in the Ashton-under-Lyne Poor Law Union and administrative county of Lancashire. Under the Local Government Act 1972, the Audenshaw Urban District was abolished, and Audenshaw has, since 1 April 1974, formed an unparished area of the Metropolitan Borough of Tameside, within the Metropolitan county of Greater Manchester.

Audenshaw was previously represented in Parliament by the Denton and Reddish constituency. Since its creation in 1983, the constituency has been held by the Labour Party, At 53°28′27.5″N 2°6′44″W (53.4743°, −2.1122°), 160 miles (257 km) north-northwest of central London and 5 miles (8 km) east of Manchester, Audenshaw stands at the head of the Dane valley. Guide Bridge is an area of Audenshaw.

Since the 2023 review of Westminster constituencies, Audenshaw has been represented by Angela Rayner of the Labour Party as part of the Ashton-under-Lyne constituency. In the 2024 United Kingdom general election, her majority over the second-placed Reform UK candidate was 6,971.

Constituency	Holder
Ashton-under-Lyne	Angela Rayner

Audenshaw is an electoral ward of Tameside, England.

The ward is represented by three councillors: Kim Ryan (Reform), Charlotte Martin (Lab), and Teresa Smith (Lab)

Election	Councillor	Councillor	Councillor
2004	Allison Seabourne (Lib Dem)	Peter Wright (Lib Dem)	Karen Wright (Lib Dem)
2006	Colin White (Lab)	Peter Wright (Lib Dem)	Karen Wright (Lib Dem)
2007	Colin White (Lab)	Wendy Brelsford (Lab)	Karen Wright (Lib Dem)
2008	Colin White (Lab)	Wendy Brelsford (Lab)	Jean Brazil (Lab)
2010	Colin White (Lab)	Wendy Brelsford (Lab)	Jean Brazil (Lab)
2011	Colin White (Lab)	Maria Bailey (Lab)	Jean Brazil (Lab)
2012	Colin White (Lab)	Maria Bailey (Lab)	Teresa Smith (Lab)
2014	Oliver Ryan (Lab)	Maria Bailey (Lab)	Teresa Smith (Lab)
2015	Oliver Ryan (Lab)	Maria Bailey (Lab)	Teresa Smith (Lab)
2016	Oliver Ryan (Lab)	Maria Bailey (Lab)	Teresa Smith (Lab)
2018	Oliver Ryan (Lab)	Maria Bailey (Lab)	Teresa Smith (Lab)

indicates seat up for re-election.

== Demography ==
Audenshaw compared
2001 UK census	Audenshaw	Tameside	England
Total population	12,790	213,043	49,138,831
White	96.5%	91.2%	91%
Asian	1.6%	5.6%	4.6%
Black	0.3%	1.2%	2.3%

According to the Office for National Statistics, at the time of the United Kingdom Census 2001, Audenshaw had a population of 12,790. The 2001 population density was 10,860 inhabitants per square mile (4,193/km^{2}), with a 100 to 93.2 female-to-male ratio. Of those over 16 years old, 28.4% were single (never married), 43.3% married, and 8.8% divorced. Audenshaw's 5,260 households included 29.0% one-person, 38.5% married couples living together, 8.8% were co-habiting couples, and 11.4% single parents with their children. Of those aged 16–74, 33.4% had no academic qualifications, similar to the Tameside average (35.2%), but above that of England (28.9%).

In 1951 the breakdown of social class in Audenshaw was recorded as 22.7% middle class and 19.3% working class. By 1971, this had changed to 23.4 middle class and 17.2% working class. The rest of the population was made up of clerical workers and skilled manual workers.

At the 2001 UK census, 80.28% of Audenshaw's residents reported themselves as being Christian, 1.1% Muslim, 0.6% Hindu, 0.3% Buddhist, and 0.1% Sikh. The census recorded 11.0% as having no religion, 0.2% had an alternative religion and 6.7% did not state their religion.

=== Population change ===
Population growth in Audenshaw since 1801
Year	1801	1811	1821	1831	1841	1851	1861	1871	1881	1891	1901	1911	1921	1931	1939	1951	1961	1971	1981	1991	2001
Population	2,275	2,772	3,781	4,891	5,374	5,427	6,327	7,024	7,308	7,958	7,216	7,977	7,876	8,461	12,015	12,661	12,122	11,901	10,771	13,173	12,790
Source:A Vision of Britain through Time

== Notable people ==
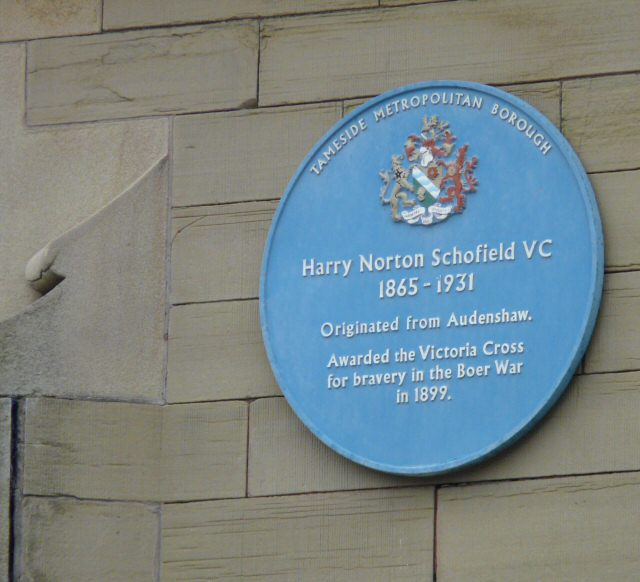
The blue plaque at Ryecroft Hall to Harry Norton Schofield VC

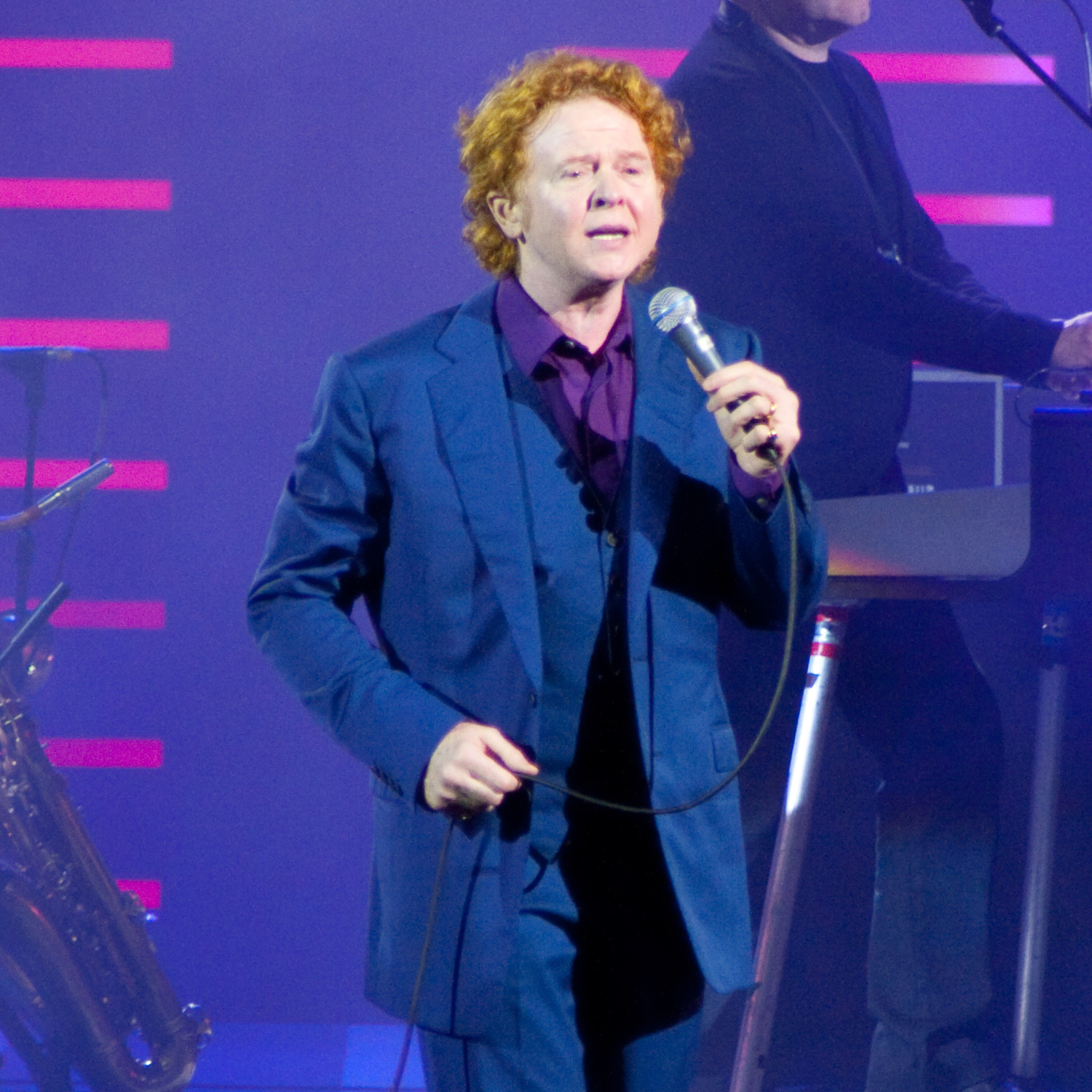
Mick Hucknall, Simply Red, 2009

- Harry Norton Schofield (1865–1931), Army officer and recipient of the Victoria Cross
- Sir Albert Kitson (1868–1937), a British-Australian geologist and naturalist, won the Lyell Medal in 1927.
- Alan Chorlton (1874–1946), mechanical engineer, helped develop the internal combustion engine & politician, MP for Manchester Platting, 1931/1935 & Bury 1935/1945
- Austin Hopkinson (1879–1962), industrialist and MP for Mossley, from 1918 to 1929 & 1931 to 1945; sat as an Independent; donated Ryecroft Hall to local people
- Andrew Findlay (1899–1976), a Scottish footballer who played 231 games
- Frank Hampson (1918–1985), a British illustrator, creator and artist of Dan Dare in the Eagle, from 1950 to 1961.
- Harold Walker, Baron Walker of Doncaster (1927–2003), politician, MP for Doncaster Central, 1964/1983 & Chairman of Ways and Means 1983/1992
- Malcolm Moss (born 1943), politician, MP for North East Cambridgeshire, from 1987 to 2010.
- Matthew Hughes (born 1950), an Australian former politician, moved to Australia in 1979.
- Mick Hucknall (born 1960), singer and songwriter, former lead singer and songwriter of pop band Simply Red
- Lonelady, (born ca.1985), singer and guitarist, real name Julie Campbell
- Brooke Vincent (born 1992), actress, played Sophie Webster in Coronation Street

== Transport ==
The area is served by Guide Bridge railway station, which is a stop on the Glossop and Hope Valley Lines. Northern Trains provides regular services to Manchester Piccadilly, Glossop, Hadfield and Rose Hill Marple.

Audenshaw railway station used to serve the town. It opened on 1 November 1887, shortly after the London & North Western Railway opened the Denton and Dukinfield branch from Denton Junction to Dukinfield station on the Great Central Railway. It was closed in 1950.

The area is now served by Audenshaw tram stop on the East Manchester line of the Manchester Metrolink; it provides services westbound to Eccles and MediaCityUK and eastbound to Ashton-under-Lyne.

Bus services are operated by Bee Network; key routes that serve the area include:

- 220: Manchester city centre - Stalybridge, via Openshaw and Dukinfield
- 221: Dukinfield - Manchester city centre, via Openshaw
- 345: Ashton-under-Lyne - Denton, via Dukinfield
- 347: Ashton-under-Lyne - Haughton Green, via Guide Bridge and Denton.

== Economy ==
Audenshaw compared
2001 UK Census	Audenshaw	Tameside	England
Population of working age	9,151	152,313	35,532,091
Full-time employment	45.9%	43.5%	40.8%
Part-time employment	11.9%	11.5%	11.8%
Self-employed	6.8%	6.5%	8.3%
Unemployed	2.8%	3.3%	3.3%
Retired	13.5%	13.3%	13.5%

Prior to the Industrial Revolution, the main occupation in Audenshaw was that of farming. The earliest recorded agriculture in the Tameside area was in Audenshaw in the period 1190–1212. As was the case in neighbouring Denton, in the 19th century most of Audenshaw's residents were occupied in the hatting industry, the manufacture of cotton and silk, and calico printing.

According to the 2001 UK census, the industry of employment Audenshaw's residents aged 16–74 was 20.3% manufacturing, 18.7% retail and wholesale, 10.1% property and business services, 9.0% health and social work, 8.2% construction, 6.8% transport and communications, 6.3% education, 6.2% public administration, 5.2% finance, 3.8% hotels and restaurants, 0.9% energy and water supply, 0.4% agriculture, 0.1% mining, and 4.0% other. Compared with national figures, the town had a relatively high percentage of residents working in manufacturing (14.8% in England).

The census recorded the economic activity of residents aged 16–74, 2.2% students were with jobs, 3.0% students without jobs, 4.7% looking after home or family, 6.5% permanently sick or disabled, and 2.7% economically inactive for other reasons.

== Landmarks ==
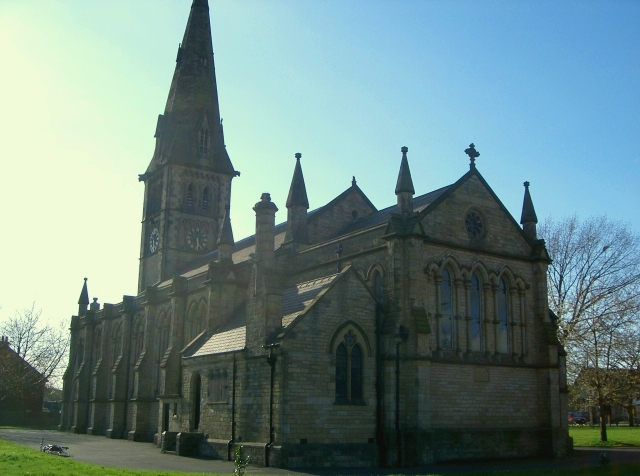
St Stephen's Church

There are nine Grade II listed buildings in Audenshaw*. These include two lodges which were originally a single barn, a trough and pillar, and St Stephen's Church. The church was constructed in 1846, at a cost of £2,900 (equivalent to £290,000 in 2025) and provided space for a congregation of 750.

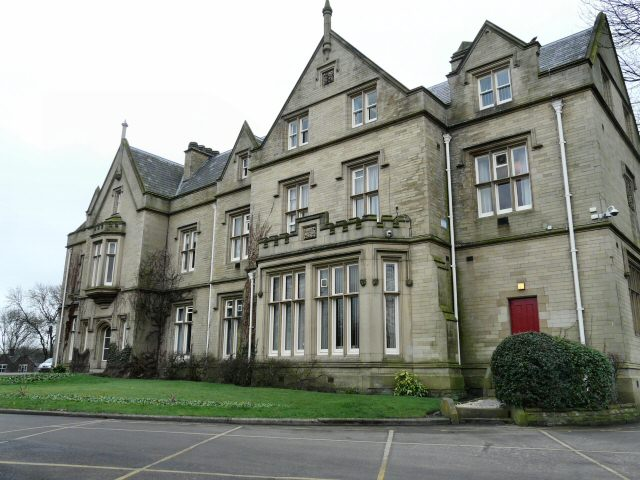
Ryecroft Hall

Ryecroft Hall, a Grade II listed building, was donated to the people of Audenshaw by the local Member of Parliament, Austin Hopkinson, in 1921.

The war memorial at the entrance to Audenshaw Cemetery is also a Grade II listed building and commemorates the 140 men from Audenshaw who lost their lives in World War I. Standing 15 feet (4.6 m), it features a bronze statue of a soldier standing on top of a square column; the sculptor was Percy George Bentham. There are slabs of black granite on the fours sides of the column with the names of the deceased. Unveiled in 1920 before a 10,000 strong crowd, it cost £1,300 (£50,000 in 2025).

== Education ==
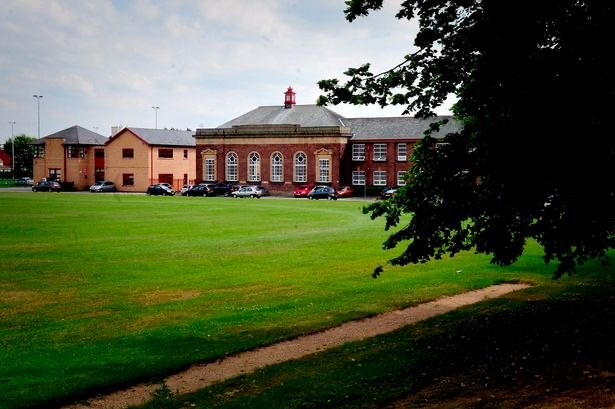
Audenshaw Grammar School

There are two nursery schools, five primary schools, and one secondary school in Audenshaw. Opened in 1932 as Audenshaw Grammar School for Boys, Audenshaw School is now the only secondary school in the town. In 2008, the school was the most successful in the borough in terms of proportion of pupils attaining five or more A*–C grades at General Certificate of Secondary Education (GCSE) including maths and English (64% in Audenshaw School compared with the average of 41.8% for Tameside and 47.6% for England) and most points per pupil at A-level. It is a specialist technology college. Until 1964, secondary education was also provided by Poplar Street Primary School which was built in 1914, although its primary school still exists.

== Sport ==
The Audenshaw Greyhound Racing and Sports Ground existed from the turn of the 20th century, initially as an athletic and coursing ground and then as a trotting track, speedway dirt track and greyhound racing track until 1934. This is not to be confused with the Athletics stadium that existed on the south side of the Manchester Road. Audenshaw is also home to the historic rugby club Aldwinians RUFC, once captain by England's rugby union captain from 1956 to 1958, Eric Evans MBE.

== See also ==
- Listed buildings in Audenshaw
- List of mills in Tameside
- List of people from Tameside
- Audenshaw Junction rail accident
