= Nigel Dempster =

British writer (1941–2007)

Nigel Richard Patton Dempster (1 November 1941 in Calcutta, India – 12 July 2007 in Ham, Surrey) was a British journalist. Best known for his celebrity gossip columns in newspapers, his work appeared in the Daily Express and Daily Mail and also in Private Eye magazine. At his death, the editor of the Daily Mail Paul Dacre was reported as saying: "His scoops were the stuff of legend and his zest for life inexhaustible."

== Career ==
Dempster was the youngest of three children of Australian mining engineer Eric Richard Patton Dempster (1890–1980), who was 50 when Dempster was born, and his Anglo-Indian wife Angela (née Stephens). Dempster's parents were resident in India at the time of their son's birth due to Eric Dempster's position as managing director of the Indian Copper Corporation and because his wife was an Indian nurse. The Dempster family descended from Dumfriesshire-born boat-builder's son Captain James Maclean Dempster (1810–1890), who migrated from England to Fremantle in Western Australia in 1831, and his wife Ann Ellen Pratt. The Dempsters went into business in such varied fields as shipping, coastal trading, farming, whaling, fishing, and gold mining. Eric Dempster's father, James Pratt Dempster (1837–1910), had married Mary Louisa, daughter of wealthy merchant James Murray Patton, in 1887. His cousin was the politician and judge George Patton, Lord Glenalmond. After his first wife's death, James Dempster married her sister, Charlotte; Eric was the second of their three sons.

Nigel Dempster was educated at Sherborne School in Dorset. After gaining three O-levels, he was expelled at 16 for being a "disruptive influence" after several misdemeanours.

After short periods working in the City and in public relations, Dempster joined the Daily Express in 1963 and remained at the title until 1971. Here he was a contributor to the 'William Hickey' column, and used his contacts to gain stories about the aristocracy and other public figures. He was then on the staff of the Daily Mail from 1971 to 2003, where he was initially deputy to Paul Callan, but replaced him as the newspaper's diarist in 1973. While Dempster was sometimes inaccurate, for instance dismissing suggestions that Prince Charles would marry Lady Diana Spencer, he forecast in 1975 that Harold Wilson would soon resign as Prime Minister, three months before he did so in 1976. Supposedly this took everyone by surprise, but a contact of Dempster's had overheard the Foreign Secretary James Callaghan discussing it. Dempster also socialised with Princess Margaret, and broke the news of her liaison with Roddy Llewellyn.

Dempster also wrote for Private Eye from 1969, where he was responsible with Peter McKay for the "Grovel" column, but left in 1985, shortly before Ian Hislop succeeded Richard Ingrams as editor. In "Grovel", Dempster was able to include material which could not be published elsewhere, and the column was the location of the first articles in the Eye to which James Goldsmith took exception. According to Hislop, Dempster fell out with the publication because he felt (in common with colleague Auberon Waugh) that he should be editor instead of Hislop. The differences allegedly began over an article making false accusations concerning the Conservative politician Cecil Parkinson and his new secretary (after Sara Keays) in Eye 606. The issue had to be reprinted (606A) after a court action with the offending and inaccurate item omitted. According to another source it ended when Dempster revealed that Richard Ingrams' marriage was in serious difficulties; Ingrams, an admirer, had previously called Dempster the "greatest living Englishman". As a result of the differences with Private Eye, Dempster was nicknamed 'Nigel Pratt-Dumpster' whenever he was subsequently mentioned, and became a frequent target of parody by the magazine. After he left the Eye, he began writing his column for The Mail on Sunday in 1986, and thus it now appeared seven days a week.

Reportedly a difficult colleague, Dempster missed out on scoops about Princess Diana, and even boasted at one point that he had not met her, according to his Daily Telegraph obituary. He began to drink more, with several incidents involving police breathalysers, and wrote less; his columns had actually been the work of four people rather than Dempster alone. In the view of observers, Dempster's column in his last years lost its bite, and in his industry he was considered something of a relic: "by now a brand rather than a journalistic asset". Paul Dacre, who succeeded Sir David English as editor of the Mail in 1992, reportedly held a low opinion of Dempster's column, and revived the 'Ephraim Hardcastle' feature, under the responsibility of Dempster's old colleague on the Eye Peter McKay, in 1996.

Dempster retired from editing the Daily Mail and Mail on Sunday diaries bearing his name in 2003 and lived with Lady Camilla Dempster, his ex-wife, who helped nurse him through the effects of progressive supranuclear palsy, a nervous disorder with some characteristics of Parkinson's disease. He died at Ensleigh Lodge, Ham Common, on 12 July 2007 of progressive supranuclear palsy.

== Personal life ==
In 1971 Dempster married Countess Emma Magdalen de Bendern, a daughter of Count John Gerard de Bendern and Lady Patricia Sybil Douglas. They divorced in 1974.

He subsequently married Lady Camilla Osborne in 1977 (divorced 2002). She was the daughter of John Osborne, 11th Duke of Leeds and his second wife, Audrey Young.

On 29 May 2004 Dempster converted to Roman Catholicism at the Brompton Oratory in London. He had been taking instruction for seven months prior to this and was a regular member of the congregation. Dempster died on 12 July 2007. According to his biographer, Tim Willis: "At his funeral, the priest declared that Dempster might have to spend a million years in purgatory – and paused just long enough to shock the congregation, before adding that, in eternity, a million years would pass in the snap of a finger."

== Books ==
- H. R. H. Princess Margaret: A Life Unfulfilled, Macmillan/Quartet, 1981
- Heiress: Story of Christina Onassis, Grove Press, 1989
- Behind Palace Doors, Orion, 1993 (with Peter Evans (author))
