= Welby Commission =

The Welby Commission was a group set up by the British Government to investigate wasteful spending in India. Established in 1895, its official name was the Royal Commission on the Administration of Expenditure of India.

The Commission membership was:

- Lord Welby (1832–1915)
- Leonard Henry Courtney
- William Lawies Jackson
- George Nathaniel Curzon
- Sir William Wedderburn (1838–1918)
- Sir Donald Martin Stewart
- Sir Edward Walter Hamilton
- Sir James Braithwaite Peile
- Sir Andrew Richard Scoble
- Ralph Henry Knox, Accountant-General of the Army
- George Lisle Ryder
- William Sproston Caine( 1842–1903)
- Dadabhai Naoroji (1825–1917)
- Thomas Ryburn Buchanan

G.K. Gokhale and Dinsha Wacha deposed before the commission in 1897.

The commission's 1900 report called for the British House of Commons to insure impartiality of financial arrangements. English costs were not to be relieved at the expense of Indian revenues. India, as a member of the British Empire, was to be prepared to provide support. The India Office must be consulted regarding charges affecting India and that India's payments to England should be tied to a fixed exchange mission in Pre-independence India.
