= Kitchen sink realism =

British social realist artistic movement

"Kitchen sink" realism
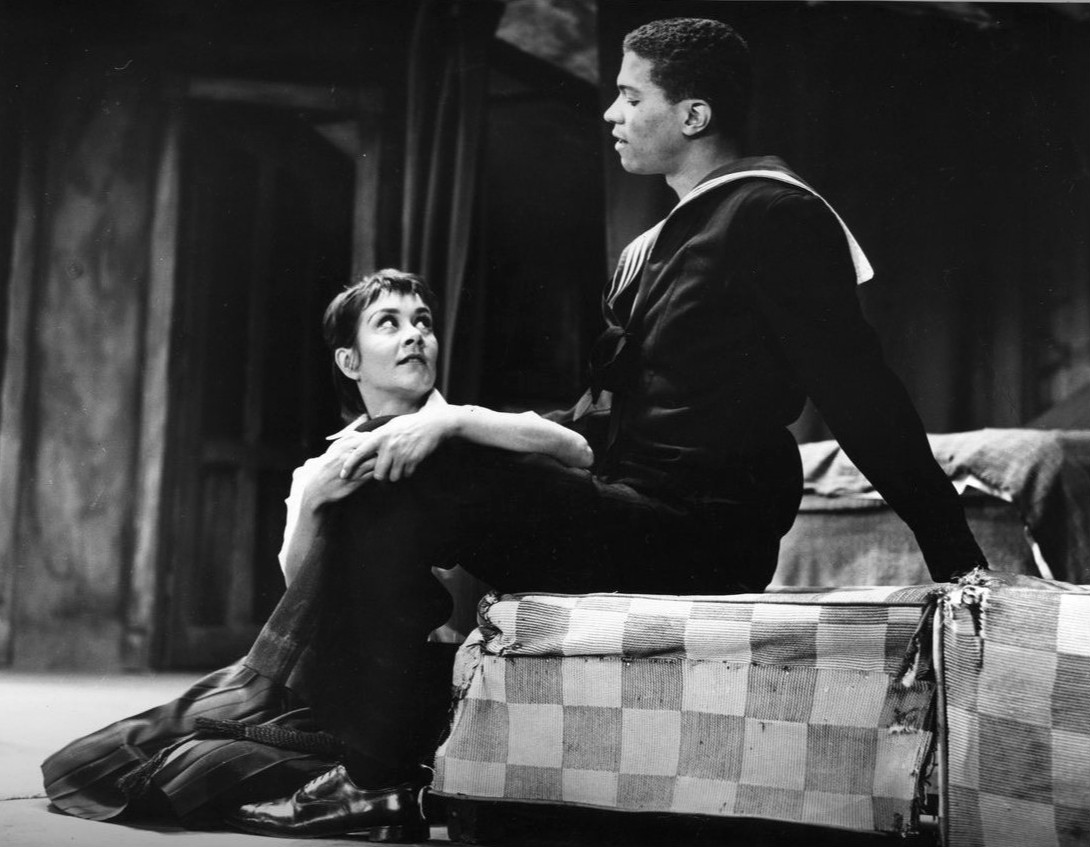
- Joan Plowright and Billy Dee Williams in the 1960 Broadway production of A Taste of Honey—an influential "kitchen sink drama".
- Years active: Late 1940s to Mid-1980s
- Location: United Kingdom
- Influences: Italian neorealism; Social realism
- Influenced: Angry young men; British New Wave; Free Cinema; French New Wave; New Hollywood

Kitchen sink realism (or kitchen sink drama) is a British cultural movement that developed in the late 1950s and early 1960s in theatre, art, novels, mainstream and independent cinema, and television, whose protagonists usually could be described as "angry young men" who were disillusioned with modern society. It used a style of social realism that depicted the domestic situations of working-class Britons living in cramped rented accommodation, and spending their off-hours drinking in grimy pubs, to explore controversial social and political issues ranging from abortion to homelessness. The harsh, realistic style stood in sharp contrast to the escapism of the previous generation's so-called "well-made plays".

The films, plays, and novels employing this style are often set in poorer industrial areas in the North of England, and use the accents and slang heard in those regions. The films It Always Rains on Sunday (1947) and The Blue Lamp (1950) are precursors of the genre, and the John Osborne play Look Back in Anger (1956) is thought of as the first of the genre. The gritty love-triangle of Look Back in Anger, for example, takes place in a cramped, one-room flat in the English Midlands. Shelagh Delaney's 1958 play A Taste of Honey (which was made into a film of the same name in 1961) is about a white teenage schoolgirl who has an affair with a black sailor, gets pregnant and then moves in with a gay male acquaintance; it raises issues such as class, ethnicity, gender and sexual orientation. The conventions of the genre have continued into the 2000s, finding expression in such television shows as Coronation Street and EastEnders.

The term "Kitchen Sink School" was first used in the visual arts, where the art critic David Sylvester used it in 1954 to describe a group of painters who called themselves the Beaux Arts Quartet, and depicted social realist–type scenes of domestic life.

== History ==
The cultural movement was rooted in the ideals of social realism, an artistic movement expressed in the visual and other realist arts which depicts working-class activities. Many artists who subscribed to social realism were painters with socialist political views. While the movement has some commonalities with Socialist Realism, another style of realism which was the "official art" advocated by the governments of the Soviet Union and other Eastern Bloc countries, the two had several differences. While social realism is a broader type of art that realistically depicts subjects of social concern, Socialist realism is characterized by the glorified depiction of socialist values, such as the emancipation of the proletariat, realistically.

Unlike Socialist realism, social realism is not an official art produced by or under the supervision of the government. The leading characters are often 'anti-heroes' rather than part of a class to be admired, as in Socialist realism. Typically, protagonists in social realism are dissatisfied with their working-class lives and the world, rather than being idealised workers who are part of a Socialist utopia in the process of creation. As such, social realism allows more space for the subjectivity of the author to be displayed.

Partly, social realism developed as a reaction against Romanticism, which promoted lofty concepts such as the "ineffable" beauty and truth of art and music and even turned them into spiritual ideals. As such, social realism focused on the "ugly realities of contemporary life and sympathized with working-class people, particularly the poor." (The quotation is from George Shi, of the University of Fine Arts, Valencia).

== Features ==
Kitchen sink realism involves working-class settings and accents, including accents from Northern England. The films and plays often explore subjects that were taboo in the 1950s and early 1960s, such as adultery, pre-marital sex, abortion, and crime.

== Origins of the term ==
In the United Kingdom, the term "kitchen sink" is derived from expressionist paintings by John Bratby that featured a kitchen sink. Bratby did various kitchen and bathroom-themed paintings, including three paintings of toilets. Bratby's paintings of people often depicted the faces of his subjects as desperate and unsightly. Kitchen sink realism artists painted everyday objects, such as trash cans and beer bottles. The critic David Sylvester wrote an article in 1954 on trends in recent English art, titled "The Kitchen Sink", in reference to Bratby's picture. Sylvester argued that there was a new interest among young painters in domestic scenes, with stress placed on the banality of life. Other artists associated with the kitchen sink style include Derrick Greaves, Edward Middleditch and Jack Smith.

== 1950s to 1960s ==
Before the 1950s, the United Kingdom's working class were often depicted stereotypically in Noël Coward's drawing room comedies and British films. Kitchen sink realism was seen as being in opposition to the "well-made play", the kind which theatre critic Kenneth Tynan once denounced as being set in "Loamshire", of dramatists like Terence Rattigan. "Well-made plays" were a dramatic genre from nineteenth-century theatre which found its early 20th-century codification in Britain in the form of William Archer's Play-Making: A Manual of Craftmanship (1912), and in the United States with George Pierce Baker's Dramatic Technique (1919). Kitchen sink works were created with the intention of changing that. Their political views were initially labeled as radical, sometimes even anarchic.

John Osborne's play Look Back in Anger (1956) depicted young men in a way similar to the then-contemporary "Angry Young Men" movement among film and theatre directors. The "angry young men" were a group of mostly working and middle class British playwrights and novelists who became prominent in the 1950s. Following the success of the Osborne play, the label "angry young men" was later applied by British media to describe young writers who were characterised by a disillusionment with traditional British society. The hero of Look Back In Anger is a graduate, but he is working in a manual occupation. It dealt with social alienation, the claustrophobia and frustrations of a provincial life on low incomes.

The impact of this work inspired Arnold Wesker, Shelagh Delaney, and numerous others, to write plays of their own. The English Stage Company at the Royal Court Theatre, headed by George Devine and Theatre Workshop organised by Joan Littlewood, were particularly prominent in bringing these plays to public attention. Critic John Heilpern wrote that Look Back in Anger expressed such "immensity of feeling and class hatred" that it altered the course of English theatre. The term "Angry theatre" was coined by critic John Russell Taylor.

This was all part of the British New Wave—a transposition of the concurrent nouvelle vague film movement in France, some of whose works, such as The 400 Blows of 1959, also emphasised the lives of the urban proletariat. British filmmakers such as Tony Richardson and Lindsay Anderson (see also Free Cinema) channelled their vitriolic anger into filmmaking. Confrontational films such as Saturday Night and Sunday Morning (1960) and A Taste of Honey (1961) were noteworthy movies in the genre. Saturday Night and Sunday Morning is about a young machinist who spends his wages at weekends on drinking and having a good time, until his affair with a married woman leads to her getting pregnant and him being beaten by her husband's cousins to the point of hospitalisation. A Taste of Honey is about a 16-year-old schoolgirl with an abusive, alcoholic mother. The schoolgirl starts a relationship with a black sailor and gets pregnant. After the sailor leaves on his ship, Jo moves in with a homosexual acquaintance who assumes the role of surrogate father. A Taste of Honey raises the issues of class, race, gender, and sexual orientation.

Later, as many of these writers and directors diversified, kitchen sink realism was adopted by television directors producing television plays. The single play was then a staple of the medium, and Armchair Theatre (1956–68), produced by the ITV contractor ABC, The Wednesday Play (1964–70) and Play for Today (1970–84), both BBC series, contained many works of this kind. Jeremy Sandford's television play Cathy Come Home (1966, directed by Ken Loach for The Wednesday Play slot), for instance, addressed homelessness.

Kitchen sink realism was used in the novels of Stan Barstow, John Braine, Alan Sillitoe, and others.

== Since the 1960s ==
Internationally, the kitchen-sink realism style has been used in various films across different cultures. For example, in the United States, such films as Nothing but a Man (1964, directed by Michael Roemer); One Potato, Two Potato (1964, directed by Larry Peerce); A Patch of Blue (1965, directed by Guy Green); and The Subject Was Roses (1968, directed by Ulu Grosbard), among others, have been specifically identified with the terminology.

The influence of kitchen-sink realism has continued in the work of other recent British directors, such as Ken Loach (whose first directorial roles were in late-1960s kitchen-sink dramas) and Mike Leigh. Subsequent re-emergence in the 1980s produced such female-centric contemporary kitchen sink-influenced films as Wish You Were Here (1987); Educating Rita (1983) and Shirley Valentine (1989)—both directed by Alfie's Lewis Gilbert; the titular twins' biopic, The Krays (1990); Rita, Sue and Bob Too (1987); and others.

Other present-day directors who have continued working within the spirit of kitchen sink realism include Andrea Arnold, Shane Meadows, Lynne Ramsay, Clio Barnard, Peter Cattaneo, and Andrew Haigh. The term "neo kitchen sink" has been used for films such as Leigh's Vera Drake (2004), Loach's I, Daniel Blake (2016), Arnold's Fish Tank (2009), Ramsay's Ratcatcher (1999), Meadows's This Is England (2006), Haigh's Weekend (2011), Barnard's The Selfish Giant (2013), and Cattaneo's The Full Monty (1997). This also includes directorial debuts from actors Gary Oldman, Nil by Mouth (1997); Tim Roth, The War Zone (1999); Peter Mullan, Orphans (1998); Richard Ayoade, Submarine (2010); and Paddy Considine, Tyrannosaur (2011); among others.

== Notable figures of the movement ==
=== Actors ===
- Jenny Agutter
- Riz Ahmed
- Niamh Algar
- Harry Andrews
- Jane Asher
- Richard Attenborough
- Hermione Baddeley
- Marion Bailey
- Harry Baird
- Stanley Baker
- Anne Bancroft
- Ian Bannen
- Alan Bates
- Jamie Bell
- Tom Bell
- Hywel Bennett
- Norman Bird
- Colin Blakely
- Brenda Blethyn
- Claire Bloom
- Dirk Bogarde
- James Bolam
- James Booth
- Wilfrid Brambell
- Dora Bryan
- Johnny Briggs
- Eleanor Bron
- Avis Bunnage
- Nichola Burley
- Richard Burton
- Sean Caffrey
- Michael Caine
- Earl Cameron
- Robert Carlyle
- Julie Christie
- Diane Cilento
- Bonar Colleano
- Kerry Condon
- Martin Compston
- Sean Connery
- John Connors
- Paddy Considine
- Tom Courtenay
- Brian Cox
- Michael Craig
- Michael Crawford
- Rosalie Crutchley
- Peggy Cummins
- Roland Curram
- Finlay Currie
- Cyril Cusack
- Phil Daniels
- Nigel Davenport
- Bette Davis
- Daniel Day-Lewis
- Brenda de Banzie
- Judi Dench
- Harris Dickinson
- Diana Dors
- Moe Dunford
- Ruth Dunning
- Danny Dyer
- Samantha Eggar
- Denholm Elliott
- Edith Evans
- Adam Faith
- Colin Farrell
- Michael Fassbender
- Hilda Fenemore
- Barbara Ferris
- Shirley Anne Field
- Peter Finch
- Albert Finney
- Julia Foster
- Pamela Franklin
- Liz Fraser
- Brenda Fricker
- Romola Garai
- Judy Geeson
- Susan George
- Brendan Gleeson
- Julian Glover
- Vanda Godsell
- Stephen Graham
- Sarah Greene
- Kenneth Haigh
- Richard Harris
- Kathleen Harrison
- William Hartnell
- Laurence Harvey
- Sally Hawkins
- Murray Head
- David Hemmings
- Ian Hendry
- Anne Heywood
- Thora Hird
- Ian Holm
- Jane Horrocks
- Bob Hoskins
- John Hurt
- Glenda Jackson
- Cosmo Jarvis
- Marianne Jean-Baptiste
- Dave Johns
- Geoffrey Keen
- Suzy Kendall
- Barry Keoghan
- Deborah Kerr
- Avice Landone
- Angela Lansbury
- Bernard Lee
- Herbert Lom
- Alfred Lynch
- Ann Lynn
- Patrick Magee
- Lesley Manville
- Alfred Marks
- Eddie Marsan
- Millicent Martin
- Neil Maskell
- Virginia Maskell
- James Mason
- James McAvoy
- David McCallum
- John McCallum
- Malcolm McDowell
- Peter McEnery
- Nika McGuigan
- Virginia McKenna
- Ian McShane
- Murray Melvin
- Vivien Merchant
- Sarah Miles
- Hayley Mills
- John Mills
- Warren Mitchell
- Yvonne Mitchell
- Terence Morgan
- Kenneth More
- Samantha Morton
- Peter Mullan
- Janet Munro
- Cillian Murphy
- John Neville
- Anthony Newley
- Nanette Newman
- Dandy Nichols
- Nora-Jane Noone
- Kayvan Novak
- Josh O'Connor
- Mark O'Halloran
- Peter O'Toole
- Gary Oldman
- Laurence Olivier
- Nigel Patrick
- Rosamund Pike
- Donald Pleasence
- Joan Plowright
- Eric Portman
- Adrienne Posta
- Dennis Price
- Om Puri
- Anthony Quayle
- Charlotte Rampling
- Andrew Ray
- Gary Raymond
- Lynn Redgrave
- Michael Redgrave
- Vanessa Redgrave
- Oliver Reed
- Beryl Reid
- Kelly Reilly
- Jack Reynor
- Marjorie Rhodes
- Sam Riley
- Andrea Riseborough
- June Ritchie
- Craig Roberts
- Rachel Roberts
- Paul Rogers
- Saoirse Ronan
- Norman Rossington
- Tim Roth
- Edward Rowe
- Claire Rushbrook
- Joanna Scanlan
- Peter Sellers
- Robert Shaw
- Susan Shaw
- Ruth Sheen
- Geraldine Sherman
- Simone Signoret
- Alastair Sim
- Gerald Sim
- John Gordon Sinclair
- Maggie Smith
- Timothy Spall
- Hayley Squires
- Terence Stamp
- Ringo Starr
- Imelda Staunton
- Robert Stephens
- Francis L. Sullivan
- Dudley Sutton
- Sylvia Syms
- Sydney Tafler
- Richard Todd
- Rita Tushingham
- Mary Ure
- Tom Vaughan-Lawlor
- James Villiers
- Kay Walsh
- Julie Walters
- David Warner
- Mona Washbourne
- Alan Webb
- Carol White
- Billie Whitelaw
- Stuart Whitman
- Jodie Whittaker
- Richard Widmark
- Billy Dee Williams
- David Wilmot
- Ray Winstone
- Googie Withers
- Donald Wolfit
- Susannah York
- Mai Zetterling

=== Cinematographers / directors / writers ===
- Lenny Abrahamson
- Lindsay Anderson
- Andrea Arnold
- Richard Ayoade
- Roy Ward Baker
- Lynne Reid Banks
- Clio Barnard
- Stan Barstow
- Simon Beaufoy
- Mary Hayley Bell
- Frank Berry
- Fyzal Boulifa
- Boulting Brothers
- Muriel Box
- Sydney Box
- Danny Boyle
- John Braine
- Paddy Breathnach
- Jack Cardiff
- John Carney
- Peter Cattaneo
- Alan Clarke
- Noel Clarke
- T. E. B. Clarke
- Jack Clayton
- Peter Collinson
- Lance Comfort
- Denys Coop
- Charles Crichton
- John Crowley
- Jules Dassin
- Terence Davies
- Desmond Davis
- Basil Dearden
- Shelagh Delaney
- Clive Donner
- Nell Dunn
- Clive Exton
- Richard Fleischer
- Bryan Forbes
- Bill Forsyth
- Freddie Francis
- William Friedkin
- Sidney J. Furie
- Sarah Gavron
- Lewis Gilbert
- Sidney Gilliat
- Peter Glenville
- Guy Green
- Janet Green
- Val Guest
- Andrew Haigh
- Peter Hall
- Willis Hall
- Robert Hamer
- Vernon Harris
- Sidney Hayers
- James Hill
- Barry Hines
- Ken Hughes
- Mark Jenkin
- Nigel Kneale
- Hanif Kureishi
- Gavin Lambert
- Walter Lassally
- David Lean
- Francis Lee
- Jack Lee
- Stephen Lewis
- Mike Leigh
- Richard Lester
- Harry Lighton
- Joan Littlewood
- Ken Loach
- Joseph Losey
- Sidney Lumet
- David Mackenzie
- Gillies MacKinnon
- Stanley Mann
- Lorenza Mazzetti
- Paul McCartney
- Shane Meadows
- Peter Medak
- David Mercer
- Tim Mielants
- John Mortimer
- Silvio Narizzano
- Bill Naughton
- Peter Nichols
- Edna O'Brien
- Damien O'Donnell
- Mark O'Rowe
- Georgia Oakley
- Joe Orton
- John Osborne
- Horace Ové
- Alun Owen
- Gordon Parry
- Trevor Peacock
- Nicholas Phipps
- Harold Pinter
- Barney Platts-Mills
- Lynne Ramsay
- Frederic Raphael
- Carol Reed
- Charlotte Regan
- Karel Reisz
- Tony Richardson
- Mordecai Richler
- Wolf Rilla
- Guy Ritchie
- Bruce Robinson
- Jeremy Sandford
- John Schlesinger
- Menelik Shabazz
- Jim Sheridan
- Alan Sillitoe
- Anthony Simmons
- David Storey
- Ralph Thomas
- J. Lee Thompson
- Enda Walsh
- Keith Waterhouse
- Jiří Weiss
- Brian Welsh
- Arnold Wesker
- Ben Wheatley
- Ted Willis
- Michael Winner
- Michael Winterbottom
- Carmel Winters
- Edgar Wright

== List of films ==
=== 1940–1958 ===
- 21 Days (1940)
- The Grapes of Wrath (1940)
- The Mortal Storm (1940)
- The Stars Look Down (1940)
- Love on the Dole (1941)
- Sheepdog of the Hills (1941)
- Target for Tonight (1941)
- In Which We Serve (1942)
- One of Our Aircraft Is Missing (1942)
- Thunder Rock (1942)
- The Man in Grey (1943)
- Millions Like Us (1943)
- The North Star (1943)
- Thursday's Child (1943)
- A Canterbury Tale (1944)
- Fanny by Gaslight (1944)
- They Came to a City (1944)
- This Happy Breed (1944)
- Brief Encounter (1945)
- I Know Where I'm Going! (1945)
- Perfect Strangers (1945)
- A Matter of Life and Death (1946)
- Men of Two Worlds (1946)
- Piccadilly Incident (1946)
- The Years Between (1946)
- Holiday Camp (1947)
- It Always Rains on Sunday (1947)
- Odd Man Out (1947)
- They Made Me a Fugitive (1947)
- When the Bough Breaks (1947)
- Brighton Rock (1948)
- Easy Money (1948)
- Good-Time Girl (1948)
- London Belongs to Me (1948)
- Moonrise (1948)
- Portrait from Life (1948)
- A Boy, a Girl and a Bike (1949)
- Boys in Brown (1949)
- The Lost People (1949)
- Passport to Pimlico (1949)
- The Small Back Room (1949)
- Whisky Galore! (1949)
- The Blue Lamp (1950)
- The Clouded Yellow (1950)
- Dance Hall (1950)
- Night and the City (1950)
- A Christmas Carol (1951)
- Pool of London (1951)
- There Is Another Sun (1951)
- Hunted (1952)
- Wide Boy (1952)
- Women of Twilight (1952)
- Cosh Boy (1953)
- Street Corner (1953)
- The Titfield Thunderbolt (1953)
- Turn the Key Softly (1953)
- The Good Die Young (1954)
- The Happiness of Three Women (1954)
- Hobson's Choice (1954)
- The 'Maggie' (1954)
- The Weak and the Wicked (1954)
- Cast a Dark Shadow (1955)
- The Deep Blue Sea (1955)
- A Kid for Two Farthings (1955)
- Jacqueline (1956)
- Together (1956)
- A Town Like Alice (1956)
- Yield to the Night (1956)
- The Flesh Is Weak (1957)
- The Heart Within (1957)
- Hell Drivers (1957)
- Woman in a Dressing Gown (1957)
- Carve Her Name with Pride (1958)
- A Cry from the Streets (1958)
- Innocent Sinners (1958)
- Nowhere to Go (1958)
- Passport to Shame (1958)
- Room at the Top (1958)
- Tread Softly Stranger (1958)
- Violent Playground (1958)

=== 1959–1963 ===
- Alive and Kicking (1959)
- Beyond This Place (1959)
- Blind Date (1959)
- Breakout (1959)
- Expresso Bongo (1959)
- In the Wake of a Stranger (1959)
- Look Back in Anger (1959)
- No Trees in the Street (1959)
- The Rough & the Smooth (1959)
- Sapphire (1959)
- Serious Charge (1959)
- Subway in the Sky (1959)
- Tiger Bay (1959)
- We Are the Lambeth Boys (1959)
- Whirlpool (1959)
- The Young and the Guilty (1959)
- The Angry Silence (1960)
- Beat Girl (1960)
- The Concrete Jungle (1960)
- The Entertainer (1960)
- Faces in the Dark (1960)
- Hell Is a City (1960)
- Jackpot (1960)
- Lena, O My Lena (1960)
- Let's Get Married (1960)
- Linda (1960)
- Never Let Go (1960)
- Never Take Sweets from a Stranger (1960)
- Night Train for Inverness (1960)
- Peeping Tom (1960)
- Saturday Night and Sunday Morning (1960)
- Sons and Lovers (1960)
- Too Young to Love (1960)
- The Day the Earth Caught Fire (1961)
- During One Night (1961)
- Flame in the Streets (1961)
- The Frightened City (1961)
- Girl on Approval (1961)
- The Greengage Summer (1961)
- Hand in Hand (1961)
- The Innocents (1961)
- Jungle Street (1961)
- The Kitchen (1961)
- The Mark (1961)
- No Love for Johnnie (1961)
- Offbeat (1961)
- Payroll (1961)
- Rag Doll (1961)
- So Evil, So Young (1961)
- Spare the Rod (1961)
- A Taste of Honey (1961)
- Victim (1961)
- Whistle Down the Wind (1961)
- The Wind of Change (1961)
- All Night Long (1962)
- The Barber of Stamford Hill (1962)
- The Boys (1962)
- Don't Talk to Strange Men (1962)
- The Inspector (1962)
- Jigsaw (1962)
- A Kind of Loving (1962)
- The L-Shaped Room (1962)
- Life for Ruth (1962)
- Live Now – Pay Later (1962)
- The Loneliness of the Long Distance Runner (1962)
- Lunch Hour (1962)
- Only Two Can Play (1962)
- The Painted Smile (1962)
- Playback (1962)
- The Playboy of the Western World (1962)
- A Prize of Arms (1962)
- The Quare Fellow (1962)
- Reach for Glory (1962)
- Some People (1962)
- Term of Trial (1962)
- These Are the Damned (1962)
- The Wild and the Willing (1962)
- Billy Liar (1963)
- Bitter Harvest (1963)
- The Caretaker (1963)
- Clash by Night (1963)
- I Could Go On Singing (1963)
- The Informers (1963)
- Lord of the Flies (1963)
- A Matter of Choice (1963)
- The Mind Benders (1963)
- A Place to Go (1963)
- The Servant (1963)
- The Silent Playground (1963)
- The Small World of Sammy Lee (1963)
- Sparrows Can't Sing (1963)
- That Kind of Girl (1963)
- This Sporting Life (1963)
- To Have and to Hold (1963)
- Tom Jones (1963)
- Tomorrow at Ten (1963)
- Two Left Feet (1963)
- The Very Edge (1963)
- West 11 (1963)
- What a Crazy World (1963)
- The World Ten Times Over (1963)
- The Yellow Teddy Bears (1963)

=== 1964–1969 ===
- The Comedy Man (1964)
- French Dressing (1964)
- Girl with Green Eyes (1964)
- Guns at Batasi (1964)
- A Hard Day's Night (1964)
- It Happened Here (1964)
- King & Country (1964)
- The Leather Boys (1964)
- Night Must Fall (1964)
- Nothing but the Best (1964)
- Psyche 59 (1964)
- The Pumpkin Eater (1964)
- Saturday Night Out (1964)
- Séance on a Wet Afternoon (1964)
- The System (1964)
- This Is My Street (1964)
- We Shall See (1964)
- 90° in the Shade (1965)
- Bunny Lake Is Missing (1965)
- Catch Us If You Can (1965)
- The Collector (1965)
- Darling (1965)
- Four in the Morning (1965)
- Game for Three Losers (1965)
- He Who Rides a Tiger (1965)
- The Knack ...and How to Get It (1965)
- Life at the Top (1965)
- The Little Ones (1965)
- The Nanny (1965)
- The Party's Over (1965)
- The Pleasure Girls (1965)
- Repulsion (1965)
- Return from the Ashes (1965)
- The Secret of My Success (1965)
- The Spy Who Came in from the Cold (1965)
- Alfie (1966)
- Blowup (1966)
- Cathy Come Home (1966)
- Dutchman (1966)
- The Family Way (1966)
- Georgy Girl (1966)
- I Was Happy Here (1966)
- The Idol (1966)
- Morgan – A Suitable Case for Treatment (1966)
- Sky West and Crooked (1966)
- The Uncle (1966)
- The War Game (1966)
- The Wrong Box (1966)
- Accident (1967)
- Bedazzled (1967)
- The Deadly Affair (1967)
- Far from the Madding Crowd (1967)
- I'll Never Forget What's'isname (1967)
- Our Mother's House (1967)
- The Penthouse (1967)
- Poor Cow (1967)
- Privilege (1967)
- Red, White and Zero (1967)
- Robbery (1967)
- The Sailor from Gibraltar (1967)
- Smashing Time (1967)
- To Sir, with Love (1967)
- Tonite, Let's All Make Love in London (1967)
- Two for the Road (1967)
- The Whisperers (1967)
- The Anniversary (1968)
- The Birthday Party (1968)
- The Bofors Gun (1968)
- Charlie Bubbles (1968)
- Deadfall (1968)
- Here We Go 'Round the Mulberry Bush (1968)
- If.... (1968)
- Inadmissible Evidence (1968)
- Interlude (1968)
- Isadora (1968)
- Joanna (1968)
- The Long Day's Dying (1968)
- Mrs. Brown, You've Got a Lovely Daughter (1968)
- Negatives (1968)
- One of the Missing (1968)
- Petulia (1968)
- Secret Ceremony (1968)
- The Touchables (1968)
- Twisted Nerve (1968)
- Up the Junction (1968)
- Wonderwall (1968)
- Work Is a Four-Letter Word (1968)
- 3 into 2 Won't Go (1969)
- The Adding Machine (1969)
- All Neat in Black Stockings (1969)
- Baby Love (1969)
- The Bed-Sitting Room (1969)
- Before Winter Comes (1969)
- Bronco Bullfrog (1969)
- Kes (1969)
- Laughter in the Dark (1969)
- The Magic Christian (1969)
- The Prime of Miss Jean Brodie (1969)
- Staircase (1969)
- Thank You All Very Much (1969)
- Three (1969)
- Two Gentlemen Sharing (1969)
- Where's Jack? (1969)
- Women in Love (1969)

=== 1970–1980 ===
- All the Right Noises (1970)
- And Soon the Darkness (1970)
- Bartleby (1970)
- Bloomfield (1970)
- The Buttercup Chain (1970)
- Connecting Rooms (1970)
- Deep End (1970)
- Entertaining Mr. Sloane (1970)
- The Games (1970)
- Goodbye Gemini (1970)
- Hoffman (1970)
- I Start Counting (1970)
- Leo the Last (1970)
- Loot (1970)
- Loving Memory (1970)
- Mumsy, Nanny, Sonny and Girly (1970)
- Nightbirds (1970)
- One Day in the Life of Ivan Denisovich (1970)
- Perfect Friday (1970)
- Performance. (1970)
- The Railway Children (1970)
- Spring & Port Wine (1970)
- Take a Girl Like You (1970)
- The Virgin and the Gypsy (1970)
- The Walking Stick (1970)
- 10 Rillington Place (1971)
- Bleak Moments (1971)
- A Clockwork Orange (1971)
- Family Life (1971)
- The Go-Between (1971)
- Gumshoe (1971)
- In the Devil's Garden (1971)
- The Night Digger (1971)
- The Nightcomers (1971)
- One Brief Summer (1971)
- Private Road (1971)
- The Raging Moon (1971)
- Say Hello to Yesterday (1971)
- Straw Dogs (1971)
- Sunday Bloody Sunday (1971)
- Unman, Wittering and Zigo (1971)
- Villain (1971)
- When Eight Bells Toll (1971)
- Whoever Slew Auntie Roo? (1971)
- A Day in the Death of Joe Egg (1972)
- Duffer (1972)
- Endless Night (1972)
- Frenzy (1972)
- Images (1972)
- Made (1972)
- My Childhood (1972)
- Nobody Ordered Love (1972)
- The Other Side of the Underneath (1972)
- The Ragman's Daughter (1972)
- The Ruling Class (1972)
- Running Scared (1972)
- Sitting Target (1972)
- Straight On 'till Morning (1972)
- The Triple Echo (1972)
- X, Y & Zee (1972)
- The 14 (1973)
- Baxter! (1973)
- Don't Look Now (1973)
- The Hireling (1973)
- The Homecoming (1973)
- Man at the Top (1973)
- My Ain Folk (1973)
- O Lucky Man! (1973)
- The Offence (1973)
- That'll Be the Day (1973)
- Voices (1973)
- Butley (1974)
- The Cherry Picker (1974)
- Little Malcolm and His Struggle Against the Eunuchs (1974)
- Moments (1974)
- Stardust (1974)
- Whose Child Am I? (1974)
- In Celebration (1975)
- Intimate Reflections (1975)
- Out of Season (1975)
- The Romantic Englishwoman (1975)
- Children (1976)
- The Moon Over the Alley (1976)
- Pressure (1976)
- The Sailor Who Fell from Grace with the Sea (1976)
- Voyage of the Damned (1976)
- Black Joy (1977)
- The Black Panther (1977)
- Equus (1977)
- The Squeeze (1977)
- Give Us Tomorrow (1978)
- Jubilee (1978)
- Killer of Sheep (1978)
- Midnight Express (1978)
- My Way Home (1978)
- Stevie (1978)
- Quadrophenia (1979)
- Radio On (1979)
- Scum (1979)
- That Sinking Feeling (1979)
- That Summer! (1979)
- Gregory's Girl (1980)
- The Long Good Friday (1980)
- Madonna and Child (1980)
- Rude Boy (1980)
- Sweet William (1980)

=== 1981–1994 ===
- Burning an Illusion (1981)
- The French Lieutenant's Woman (1981)
- Looks and Smiles (1981)
- Memoirs of a Survivor (1981)
- A Sense of Freedom (1981)
- Angel (1982)
- Britannia Hospital (1982)
- Moonlighting (1982)
- The Return of the Soldier (1982)
- An Unsuitable Job for a Woman (1982)
- Bless Their Little Hearts (1983)
- Death and Transfiguration (1983)
- Educating Rita (1983)
- Local Hero (1983)
- Made in Britain (1983)
- Meantime (1983)
- My Brother's Wedding (1983)
- Cal (1984)
- The Chain (1984)
- Comfort and Joy (1984)
- Four Days in July (1984)
- Dance with a Stranger (1985)
- The Good Father (1985)
- Letter to Brezhnev (1985)
- My Beautiful Laundrette (1985)
- Absolute Beginners (1986)
- Knights & Emeralds (1986)
- Mona Lisa (1986)
- Sid & Nancy (1986)
- Hope and Glory (1987)
- The Lonely Passion of Judith Hearne (1987)
- Prick Up Your Ears (1987)
- Rita, Sue & Bob Too! (1987)
- Sammy and Rosie Get Laid (1987)
- Wish You Were Here (1987)
- Withnail and I (1987)
- Distant Voices, Still Lives (1988)
- Drowning by Numbers (1988)
- High Hopes (1988)
- We Think the World of You (1988)
- The Firm (1989)
- Getting It Right (1989)
- My Left Foot (1989)
- Shirley Valentine (1989)
- The Big Man (1990)
- The Field (1990)
- Hidden Agenda (1990)
- The Krays (1990)
- Life Is Sweet (1990)
- Silent Scream (1990)
- Truly, Madly, Deeply (1990)
- Afraid of the Dark (1991)
- Buddy's Song (1991)
- The Commitments (1991)
- Drop Dead Fred (1991)
- Hear My Song (1991)
- The Hours and Times (1991)
- Let Him Have It (1991)
- London Kills Me (1991)
- The Lost Language of Cranes (1991)
- Riff-Raff (1991)
- Young Soul Rebels (1991)
- The Crying Game (1992)
- The Long Day Closes (1992)
- The Railway Station Man (1992)
- Soft Top, Hard Shoulder (1992)
- You, Me and Marley (1992)
- The Cement Garden (1993)
- Dirty Weekend (1993)
- In the Name of the Father (1993)
- Naked (1993)
- Raining Stones (1993)
- The Secret Rapture (1993)
- The Snapper (1993)
- Ailsa (1994)
- Backbeat (1994)
- Eden Valley (1994)
- Ladybird, Ladybird (1994)
- Priest (1994)
- Shallow Grave (1994)

=== 1995–2000 ===
- Butterfly Kiss (1995)
- Circle of Friends (1995)
- Land and Freedom (1995)
- The Near Room (1995)
- Small Faces (1995)
- Some Kind of Life (1995)
- Beautiful Thing (1996)
- Brassed Off (1996)
- Carla's Song (1996)
- Different for Girls (1996)
- The Disappearance of Finbar (1996)
- Secrets & Lies (1996)
- Small Time (1996)
- Some Mother's Son (1996)
- Stella Does Tricks (1996)
- Trainspotting (1996)
- The Van (1996)
- When Saturday Comes (1996)
- The Boxer (1997)
- Bring Me the Head of Mavis Davis (1997)
- The Butcher Boy (1997)
- Career Girls (1997)
- Face (1997)
- The Full Monty (1997)
- House of America (1997)
- I Went Down (1997)
- Metroland (1997)
- My Son, the Fanatic (1997)
- Nil by Mouth (1997)
- Shooting Fish (1997)
- TwentyFourSeven (1997)
- Twin Town (1997)
- Under the Skin (1997)
- All the Little Animals (1998)
- Bedrooms & Hallways (1998)
- Crush Proof (1998)
- Divorcing Jack (1998)
- Gasman (1998)
- The General (1998)
- Get Real (1998)
- Hideous Kinky (1998)
- I Want You (1998)
- Little Voice (1998)
- Lock, Stock & Two Smoking Barrels (1998)
- My Name Is Joe (1998)
- Orphans (1998)
- Resurrection Man (1998)
- Soft Sand, Blue Sea (1998)
- Waking Ned Devine (1998)
- Angela's Ashes (1999)
- Beautiful People (1999)
- Dreaming of Joseph Lees (1999)
- East Is East (1999)
- Felicia's Journey (1999)
- Human Traffic (1999)
- Ratcatcher (1999)
- A Room for Romeo Brass (1999)
- Sunburn (1999)
- Virtual Sexuality (1999)
- The War Zone (1999)
- Whatever Happened to Harold Smith? (1999)
- With or Without You (1999)
- Wonderland (1999)
- Aberdeen (2000)
- Billy Elliot (2000)
- Borstal Boy (2000)
- Bread and Roses (2000)
- Complicity (2000)
- Essex Boys (2000)
- Flick (2000)
- Last Resort (2000)
- Liam (2000)
- Saltwater (2000)
- Saving Grace (2000)
- Some Voices (2000)
- When Brendan Met Trudy (2000)

=== 2001–2008 ===
- Blow Dry (2001)
- Disco Pigs (2001)
- Goodbye Charlie Bright (2001)
- Late Night Shopping (2001)
- Me Without You (2001)
- The Navigators (2001)
- On the Edge (2001)
- Strictly Sinatra (2001)
- 24 Hour Party People (2002)
- All or Nothing (2002)
- Anita & Me (2002)
- Bend It Like Beckham (2002)
- Bloody Sunday (2002)
- Dirty Pretty Things (2002)
- The Magdalene Sisters (2002)
- Morvern Callar (2002)
- Once Upon a Time in the Midlands (2002)
- Pure (2002)
- Sweet Sixteen (2002)
- 16 Years of Alcohol (2003)
- AfterLife (2003)
- Calendar Girls (2003)
- Cowboys & Angels (2003)
- Dead Bodies (2003)
- I Capture the Castle (2003)
- Intermission (2003)
- Song for a Raggy Boy (2003)
- Spin the Bottle (2003)
- Veronica Guerin (2003)
- Wasp (2003)
- Young Adam (2003)
- 9 Songs (2004)
- Adam & Paul (2004)
- Bullet Boy (2004)
- Capital Letters (2004)
- Dead Man's Shoes (2004)
- Dear Frankie (2004)
- Ae Fond Kiss... (2004)
- The Football Factory (2004)
- A Home at the End of the World (2004)
- In My Father's Den (2004)
- Man About Dog (2004)
- Mickybo and Me (2004)
- My Summer of Love (2004)
- Rory O'Shea Was Here (2004)
- Shaun of the Dead (2004)
- Vera Drake (2004)
- A Way of Life (2004)
- Breakfast on Pluto (2005)
- Gypo (2005)
- Keeping Mum (2005)
- Kinky Boots (2005)
- Love + Hate (2005)
- The Mighty Celt (2005)
- Mrs. Henderson Presents (2005)
- Mrs. Palfrey at the Claremont (2005)
- Mouth to Mouth (2005)
- On a Clear Day (2005)
- Short Order (2005)
- Driving Lessons (2006)
- The History Boys (2006)
- Kidulthood (2006)
- London to Brighton (2006)
- Once (2006)
- Red Road (2006)
- Starter for 10 (2006)
- This Is England (2006)
- Venus (2006)
- The Wind That Shakes the Barley (2006)
- Boy A (2007)
- Brick Lane (2007)
- Cassandra's Dream (2007)
- Control (2007)
- Garage (2007)
- Hallam Foe (2007)
- It's a Free World... (2007)
- Outlaw (2007)
- Son of Rambow (2007)
- The Waiting Room (2007)
- Adulthood (2008)
- Better Things (2008)
- Eden (2008)
- Eden Lake (2008)
- Fifty Dead Men Walking (2008)
- Gardens of the Night (2008)
- Happy-Go-Lucky (2008)
- How to Be (2008)
- Hunger (2008)
- I Know You Know (2008)
- Julia (2008)
- Kisses (2008)
- Of Time and the City (2008)
- RocknRolla (2008)
- Shifty (2008)
- Somers Town (2008)
- Zebra Crossing (2008)

=== 2009–2016 ===
- Awaydays (2009)
- A Boy Called Dad (2009)
- Bunny and the Bull (2009)
- Cherrybomb (2009)
- The Disappearance of Alice Creed (2009)
- Down Terrace (2009)
- An Education (2009)
- The Firm (2009)
- Fish Tank (2009)
- Five Minutes of Heaven (2009)
- Harry Brown (2009)
- London River (2009)
- Looking for Eric (2009)
- Nowhere Boy (2009)
- One Hundred Mornings (2009)
- Perrier's Bounty (2009)
- Savage (2009)
- Tony (2009)
- Another Year (2010)
- The Arbor (2010)
- Between the Canals (2010)
- Cemetery Junction (2010)
- Chatroom (2010)
- Donkeys (2010)
- Four Lions (2010)
- In Our Name (2010)
- London Boulevard (2010)
- Made in Dagenham (2010)
- My Brothers (2010)
- NEDS (2010)
- Parked (2010)
- Snap (2010)
- SoulBoy (2010)
- Submarine (2010)
- Third Star (2010)
- West Is West (2010)
- Albatross (2011)
- Attack the Block (2011)
- Charlie Casanova (2011)
- Death of a Superhero (2011)
- Eliot & Me (2011)
- Everywhere and Nowhere (2011)
- The Guard (2011)
- Kill List (2011)
- Tinker, Tailor, Soldier, Spy (2011)
- Tyrannosaur (2011)
- Weekend (2011)
- Wild Bill (2011)
- Wreckers (2011)
- The Angels' Share (2012)
- Broken (2012)
- Everyday (2012)
- Ginger & Rosa (2012)
- Good Vibrations (2012)
- Ill Manors (2012)
- Jump (2012)
- Kelly + Victor (2012)
- My Brother the Devil (2012)
- The Rise (2012)
- Shadow Dancer (2012)
- Shell (2012)
- Stalker (2012)
- What Richard Did (2012)
- A Belfast Story (2013)
- Filth (2013)
- For Those in Peril (2013)
- Having You (2013)
- How I Live Now (2013)
- Life's a Breeze (2013)
- Run & Jump (2013)
- The Selfish Giant (2013)
- Starred Up (2013)
- Still Life (2013)
- Sunshine on Leith (2013)
- '71 (2014)
- The Beat Beneath My Feet (2014)
- Bypass (2014)
- Calvary (2014)
- The Falling (2014)
- Get Up & Go (2014)
- Glassland (2014)
- God Help the Girl (2014)
- I Used to Live Here (2014)
- Jimmy's Hall (2014)
- Keeping Rosy (2014)
- Lilting (2014)
- Northern Soul (2014)
- Patrick's Day (2014)
- Pride (2014)
- 45 Years (2015)
- Chicken (2015)
- Just Jim (2015)
- The Lady in the Van (2015)
- Legend (2015)
- London Road (2015)
- My Name Is Emily (2015)
- Suffragette (2015)
- The Survivalist (2015)
- Traders (2015)
- 100 Streets (2016)
- Across the River (2016)
- Adult Life Skills (2016)
- American Honey (2016)
- Brotherhood (2016)
- A Date for Mad Mary (2016)
- Handsome Devil (2016)
- Hello Destroyer (2016)
- I, Daniel Blake (2016)
- In View (2016)
- London Town (2016)
- Mammal (2016)
- A Monster Calls (2016)
- Sing Street (2016)
- Starfish (2016)
- A Street Cat Named Bob (2016)
- To Dream (2016)
- Trespass Against Us (2016)
- The Young Offenders (2016)

=== 2017–2021 ===
- Bad Day for the Cut (2017)
- Beast (2017)
- The Bookshop (2017)
- Cardboard Gangsters (2017)
- Daphne (2017)
- Dark River (2017)
- The Drummer & the Keeper (2017)
- England Is Mine (2017)
- The Escape (2017)
- Funny Cow (2017)
- God's Own Country (2017)
- Jawbone (2017)
- Journeyman (2017)
- Kissing Candice (2017)
- Maze (2017)
- Michael Inside (2017)
- Pin Cushion (2017)
- The Rider (2017)
- T2: Trainspotting (2017)
- Tomato Red (2017)
- American Woman (2018)
- Back Roads (2018)
- Benjamin (2018)
- The Delinquent Season (2018)
- The Dig (2018)
- Dublin Oldschool (2018)
- Farming (2018)
- Float Like a Butterfly (2018)
- Happy New Year, Colin Burstead (2018)
- In Fabric (2018)
- Jellyfish (2018)
- Postcards from London (2018)
- Rosie (2018)
- Sometimes, Always, Never (2018)
- Strangeways, Here We Come (2018)
- Two for Joy (2018)
- Wild Rose (2018)
- Above Suspicion (2019)
- Animals (2019)
- Bait (2019)
- Beats (2019)
- Blinded by the Light (2019)
- A Bump Along the Way (2019)
- Calm with Horses (2019)
- County Lines (2019)
- Dark Lies the Island (2019)
- Days of the Bagnold Summer (2019)
- Dirty God (2019)
- Eternal Beauty (2019)
- A Good Woman Is Hard to Find (2019)
- The Last Right (2019)
- Little Joe (2019)
- Lynn + Lucy (2019)
- Make Up (2019)
- My Day (2019)
- Nocturnal (2019)
- Ordinary Love (2019)
- Perfect 10 (2019)
- Pink Wall (2019)
- Rialto (2019)
- Roads (2019)
- Rocks (2019)
- Saint Maud (2019)
- Sorry We Missed You (2019)
- Yesterday (2019)
- After Love (2020)
- The Bright Side (2020)
- Dating Amber (2020)
- The Evening Hour (2020)
- Herself (2020)
- Limbo (2020)
- Mogul Mowgli (2020)
- Never, Rarely, Sometimes, Always (2020)
- Nowhere Special (2020)
- Pixie (2020)
- Redemption of a Rogue (2020)
- Surge (2020)
- Topside (2020)
- Wildfire (2020)
- Ali & Ava (2021)
- Belfast (2021)
- Benediction (2021)
- Boiling Point (2021)
- A Brixton Tale (2021)
- Censor (2021)
- Everybody's Talking About Jamie (2021)
- Here Before (2021)
- The Last Bus (2021)
- Last Night in Soho (2021)
- Once a Year on Blackpool Sands (2021)
- The Pebble and the Boy (2021)
- True Things (2021)

=== 2022–present ===
- Aisha (2022)
- Ann (2022)
- Ballywalter (2022)
- The Banshees of Inisherin (2022)
- The Black Guelph (2022)
- Blue Jean (2022)
- Empire of Light (2022)
- The Eternal Daughter (2022)
- God's Creatures (2022)
- The Good Neighbor (2022)
- It Is in Us All (2022)
- Joyride (2022)
- Lakelands (2022)
- The Quiet Girl (2022)
- Róise & Frank (2022)
- See How They Run (2022)
- The Sparrow (2022)
- Typist, Artist, Pirate, King (2022)
- All of Us Strangers (2023)
- The End We Start From (2023)
- Femme (2023)
- Flora and Son (2023)
- Hoard (2023)
- In the Land of Saints and Sinners (2023)
- The Miracle Club (2023)
- Next Goal Wins (2023)
- The Old Oak (2023)
- Rye Lane (2023)
- Scrapper (2023)
- Silver Haze (2023)
- Sky Peals (2023)
- Sunlight (2023)
- That They May Face the Rising Sun (2023)
- Unicorns (2023)
- The Unlikely Pilgrimage of Harold Fry (2023)
- Verdigris (2023)
- Bird (2024)
- Blitz (2024)
- Bring Them Down (2024)
- Hard Truths (2024)
- Kathleen Is Here (2024)
- Kneecap (2024)
- Lollipop (2024)
- On Becoming a Guinea Fowl (2024)
- The Outrun (2024)
- Sebastian (2024)
- Small Things Like These (2024)
- Anemone (2025)
- Die My Love (2025)
- Dragonfly (2025)
- Hamlet (2025)
- I Swear (2025)
- Odyssey (2025)
- On the Sea (2025)
- Pillion (2025)
- Plainclothes (2025)
- Rose of Nevada (2025)
- Salvable (2025)
- Steve (2025)
- Urchin (2025)
- Wasteman (2025)
- Chork (2026)
- Hillside Drive (2026)
- I See Buildings Fall Like Lightning (2026)
- A Long Winter (2026)
- Tender Loving Care (2026)

== List of plays ==
- Look Back in Anger (1956)
- My Flesh, My Blood (Radio play, 1957)
- A Taste of Honey (1958)
- Sparrers Can't Sing (1960)
- Alfie (1963)
- Saved (1965)
- Up the Junction (TV play, 1965)
- Cathy Come Home (TV play, 1966)

== See also ==
- Accumulation by dispossession
- Ashcan School
- Bagholder
- Disappointment
- Disenchantment
- Dispossession, oppression, and depression
- Economic mobility
- Italian neorealism
- Naturalism
- Precariat
- Social mobility
- Working-class culture
