= Patricia Farmer =

Canadian television actress

- Born: Patricia Ann Farmer; September 27, 1938; Watford, Hertfordshire, England
- Died: March 5, 2004 (aged 65); Nanaimo, British Columbia, Canada
- Education: The Royal Conservatory of Music
- Occupation: Actress
- Years active: 1957–1964
- Spouse: Gregory Barnes
- Children: 2

Patricia Ann Farmer (27 September 1938 – 5 March 2004) was an English-born Canadian stage and television actress.

== Biography ==
Patricia, the daughter of Thomas and Pauline Farmer, born in Watford, England. She immigrated to Canada in 1955 with her parents and trained at The Royal Conservatory of Music, Toronto. After becoming Miss Canada, she pursued an acting career with the Canadian Players and onto the television screen. In 1960s, Patricia married Gregory Barnes in West Vancouver and they had two children, David and Jenny. In mid-1970s, the family moved to Saltspring Island.

== Death ==
Patricia Farmer died at Nanaimo Regional General Hospital, Vancouver Island, British Columbia, on 5 March, 2004, aged 65.

=== Television credits ===
Year	Title	Role	Notes
1957–1958	On Camera	Various	5 episodes
1958	Folio		Episode: "Great Catherine"
1958	General Motors Theatre	Lydia Bennet	Episode: "Pride and Prejudice"
1963	The Serial	Catherine McGregor	"Son of a Hundred Kings"
1962–1964	Playdate	Various	5 episodes
