= X rating =

Film rating denoting content suitable only for adults

An X rating is a film rating that indicates that the film contains content that is considered to be suitable only for adults. Films with an X rating may have scenes of graphic violence or explicit sexual acts that may be disturbing or offensive to some viewers. The X rating is used in different ways by different countries, and it may have legal or commercial implications for the distribution and exhibition of such films. For example, some countries may ban or restrict the sale or rental of X-rated films, while others may allow them only in specific theaters or with special taxes. Some countries may also have different criteria or definitions for what constitutes an X-rated film, and some may consider the artistic merit of the film as a factor in classification. The X rating has been renamed or replaced by other ratings in some countries over time.

== Australia ==
The Australian Classification Board (formerly known as the Office of Film and Literature Classification), a government institution, issues ratings for all movies and television shows exhibited, televised, sold, or hired in Australia. Material showing explicit, non-simulated sex that is pornographic in nature is rated X18+.

People under 18 may not buy, rent, exhibit, or view these films in cinemas. The exhibition or sale of these films to people under the age of 18 years is a criminal offence carrying a maximum fine of $5,500. Films classified as X18+ are forbidden from being sold or rented anywhere in the six states of Australia. They are legally available to be sold or hired in the Australian Capital Territory and the Northern Territory. Importing X18+ material from these territories to any of the Australian states is legal, as the constitution forbids any restrictions on trade between the states and territories.

== France ==
Films may be shown in theaters in France only after classification by an administrative commission of the Ministry of Culture. In 1975, the X classification (officially: "pornographic or violence-inciting movies", films pornographiques ou d'incitation à la violence) was created for pornographic movies, or movies with successions of scenes of graphic violence. The commission has some leeway in classification; it may for instance take into account the artistic qualities of a movie to not count it as "pornographic". Movies with an X rating may only be shown in specific theaters; they bear higher tax rates and cannot receive any aid from the Centre national du cinéma et de l'image animée, whether for the movies themselves or for the theaters screening these movies. Some of these taxes were repealed in 2020 as part of an effort to reduce "low-yield" taxes.

1100 movies were X-rated in France, with the last classification occurring in 1996, as pornography went from theaters to video, which doesn't undergo as much control as cinema. The last adult movie theater in Paris, the Beverley in Paris, closed down in 2019 only leaving the Vox in Grenoble.

Only ten movies were X-rated for violence: Open Season by Collinson, Lola by José María Forqué, Pique Nique (short film) by Gérard Bienfait, The Texas Chain Saw Massacre by Tobe Hooper, Hitch-Hike by Pasquale Festa Campanile, Return of the 38 Gang by Giuseppe Vari, The Warriors by Walter Hill, Frauengefängnis 3 by Jesús Franco, Mad Max by George Miller and Dawn of the Dead by George A. Romero; most of these were subsequently re-rated. For example, The Warriors and Mad Max are now rated '12'.

In 2000, some conservative associations sued the government for granting the movie Baise-moi (Fuck me), which contained graphic, realistic scenes of sex and violence, a non-X classification. The Council of State ruled that the movie should have been rated X as it was then the only rating which banned this films to minors. The decision was highly controversial, and the '18' rating was reestablished for movies not pornographic or violence-inciting; Baise-moi became the first movie to have been awarded the newly reestablished '18' rating, which had been replaced by '16' in 1990.

In 2009, Histoires de sexe(s) by Ovidie and Jack Tyler was ordered by the Classification Board to be X-rated; the directors then withdrew their demand for a cinema certificate and released their movie direct-to-video.

== United Kingdom ==
Two "X" symbols used by the British Board of Film Classification (1951–1970 and 1970–1982, respectively)

The original X certificate, replacing the H certificate, was issued between 1951 and 1982 by the British Board of Film Censors in the United Kingdom. It was introduced as a result of the Wheare Report on film censorship. From 1951 to 1970, it meant "For exhibition when no child under 16 is present" and from 1970 to 1982 it was redefined as meaning "Suitable for those aged 18 and over". The X certificate was replaced in November 1982 by the 18 certificate.

Sometimes the rating of a film has changed significantly over time. For example, the French film Jules and Jim received an X rating in 1962 that was reduced to a PG (Parental Guidance) rating in 1991, and later raised to 12A in 2021. In some cases, films with extreme political content received an X rating. Battleship Potemkin was refused a certificate for "inflammatory subtitles and Bolshevik propaganda" in 1926, passed X in 1954, and finally rated PG in 1987.

== United States ==
Until 1990, the X rating was used by the Motion Picture Association of America for films deemed only suitable for adults.

In the United States, the X rating was applied to a film that contained content judged unsuitable for children, such as extreme violence, strongly implied sex, and graphic language. When the MPAA film rating system began in North America on November 1, 1968, the X rating was given to a film by the Motion Picture Association of America (now the Motion Picture Association) if submitted to it, or due to its non-trademarked status, it could be self-applied to a film by a distributor that knew beforehand that its film contained content unsuitable for minors. From the late 1960s to about the mid-1980s, many mainstream films were released with an X rating, such as Midnight Cowboy, Medium Cool, The Girl on a Motorcycle, Last Summer, Last of the Mobile Hot Shots, Beyond the Valley of the Dolls, The Street Fighter, A Clockwork Orange, Sweet Sweetback's Baadasssss Song, Fritz the Cat, Flesh Gordon, Alice in Wonderland: An X-Rated Musical Comedy, Last Tango in Paris and The Evil Dead. Films that achieved critical and commercial success were later re-rated R after minor cuts, including Midnight Cowboy and A Clockwork Orange. The threat of an X rating also encouraged filmmakers to re-edit their films to achieve an R rating; one notable example of this was the 1987 action film RoboCop, which had to be edited eleven times before it could attain an R rating.

Because the X rating was not trademarked, anybody could apply it to their films, including pornographers, as many began to do in the 1970s. As pornography began to become more popular and more legally and commercially tolerated, pornographers placed an X rating on their films to emphasize the adult content. Some even started using multiple X's (i.e. XX, XXX, etc.) to give the impression that their film contained more graphic sexual content than the simple X rating. In some cases, the X ratings were applied by reviewers or film scholars, e.g. William Rotsler, who wrote "The XXX-rating is for hardcore, the XX-rating is for softcore, and an X-rating is for comparatively cool films." Nothing beyond the simple X rating has ever been officially recognized by the MPAA. Because of the heavy use of the X rating by pornographers, it became associated largely with pornographic films, so that non-pornographic films given an X rating would have fewer theaters willing to book them and fewer venues for advertising. Many newspapers refused to advertise X-rated films. This led to a number of films being released unrated sometimes with a warning that the film contained content for adults only. In response, the MPAA eventually agreed in 1990 to a new NC-17 rating that would be trademarked, and could only be applied by the MPAA itself. By trademarking the rating, the MPAA committed to defending an NC-17 film charged with violating obscenity laws.

== See also ==
- List of NC-17 rated films
- List of AO-rated video games
- .xxx, top-level Internet domain
