= Norman Mitchell =

British actor (1918–2001)

- Born: Norman Mitchell Driver; 27 August 1918; Sheffield, England
- Died: 19 March 2001 (aged 82); King's Lynn, England
- Occupations: Stage, television and film Actor
- Years active: 1951–2001
- Spouse: Pauline Mitchell (m. 1946; died 1992)
- Children: 2, including Christopher

Norman Mitchell Driver (27 August 1918 – 19 March 2001), known professionally as Norman Mitchell, was an English television, stage and film actor.

He was born in Sheffield, West Riding of Yorkshire, where his father was a mining engineer and his mother a concert singer. He attended Carterknowle Grammar School and the University of Sheffield, before appearing in repertory theatre and with the Royal Shakespeare Company. During World War II he served with the Royal Army Medical Corps. He then made many television appearances and appeared in over sixty films.

Mitchell was married to actress Pauline Mitchell until her death in 1992. He was the father of Jacqueline Mitchell and actor Christopher Mitchell, known for his role in the BBC sitcom It Ain't Half Hot Mum. His son Christopher predeceased him by a month.

== Selected filmography ==
- The Seekers (1954) - Grayson
- Up to His Neck (1954) - Fungus
- A Kid for Two Farthings (1955) - Stallholder (uncredited)
- Police Dog (1955)
- You Lucky People! (1955) - Soldier (uncredited)
- Five Clues to Fortune (1957) - Bert
- Three Sundays to Live (1957) - Police Sergeant
- The Man Who Wouldn't Talk (1958) - (uncredited)
- Battle of the V-1 (1958) - German in Kübelwagen (uncredited)
- The Price of Silence (1960) - Landlord (uncredited)
- Beat Girl (1960) - Club Doorman
- This Sporting Life (1963) - Tenant (uncredited)
- The Yellow Teddy Bears (1963) - Larry
- West 11 (1963) - Shop Customer (uncredited)
- Carry On Cabby (1963) - Bespectacled Businessman (uncredited)
- Carry On Spying (1964) - Native Policeman / Algerian Gent
- Carry On Cleo (1964) - Heckler (uncredited)
- A Home of Your Own (1964) - The Foreman
- The Little Ones (1965) - (uncredited)
- You Must Be Joking! (1965) - Billingsgate Fish Porter (uncredited)
- Bunny Lake Is Missing (1965) - Mover
- Three Hats for Lisa (1965) - Truck driver
- Invasion (1965) - Lorry Driver
- The Great St. Trinian's Train Robbery (1966) - William (Willy the Jelly-Man)
- I Was Happy Here (1966)
- Carry On Screaming! (1966) - Cabby
- The Jokers (1967) - Window Cleaner giving interview (uncredited)
- A Challenge for Robin Hood (1967) - Dray Driver
- Two a Penny (1967) - Attendant
- Half a Sixpence (1967) - Master of Ceremonies
- I'll Never Forget What's'isname (1967) - Party Guest (uncredited one-line spoken part)
- Oliver! (1968) - Arresting Policeman
- Diamonds for Breakfast (1968) - (uncredited)
- Two Gentlemen Sharing (1969) - Policeman
- Some Will, Some Won't (1970) - Policeman
- One More Time (1970) - Sergeant Smith
- The Games (1970) - Harry's Boss (uncredited)
- Atlantic Wall (1970) - Bobbie 1
- On the Buses (1971) - London Transport Official
- Bless This House (1972) - Police Sergeant
- Lady Caroline Lamb (1972) - Restaurant functionary
- Nearest and Dearest (1972) - Vernon Smallpiece
- And Now the Screaming Starts! (1973) - Constable
- Frankenstein and the Monster from Hell (1974) - Police Sergeant
- Man About the House (1974) - Arthur Mulgrove - Doorman
- Legend of the Werewolf (1975) - Tiny
- Barry Lyndon (1975) - British Soldier (uncredited)
- The Moon Over the Alley (1976) - Joe Tudge
- The Pink Panther Strikes Again (1976) - Mr. Bullock
- The Prince and the Pauper (1977) - Constable (uncredited)
- The Big Sleep (1978) - Doorman at Eddie's Club (uncredited)
- Carry On Emmannuelle (1978) - Drunken Husband
- A Hitch in Time (1978) - Police Sergeant (uncredited)
- The Return of the Soldier (1982) - Ernest
- The Wicked Lady (1983) - Man at Inn
- Revenge of Billy the Kid (1992) - Mr. Allott
- Dirty Weekend (1993) - Repair Man
- Lighthouse (1999) - Brownlow
- Meanwhile (2003) - the Landlord (final film role)

== Selected television credits ==
- Lorna Doone (1963) - Sergeant Bloxham
- No Cloak – No Dagger (1963) - Police Sergeant
- The Saint (1962, Ep. #1-01) - Mr. Smith
- Call the Gun Expert (1964) - Manager
- Gideon's Way (1964 - Ep. The Rhyme and the Reason) - Club Manager
- The Sullavan Brothers (1965) - Mr. Crisp
- Sherlock Holmes (1965) - Shinwell Johnson
- Doctor Who (in the serial The Daleks' Master Plan) (1965) - First Policeman
- The Prisoner (1967) - Mechanic in the episode "The General"
- Softly, Softly (1966-1969) - Steve / Dave Cullen
- Dad's Army (1969) - Captain Rogers
- Up Pompeii! (1970) - Stovus Primus
- Doctor at Large (1971) - Det. Sgt. Rowley
- On the Buses (1970-1971) - Nobby
- The Moonstone (1972) - Mr. Ablewhite
- Whatever Happened to the Likely Lads? (1973-1974) - Jack / Barman / Pub Manager
- Z-Cars (1962-1977) - George Belling / Stanley Cook / Arnold Porter / PC Adams / Chizzy Black / 1st PC
- Beryl's Lot (1973-1977) - Charlie Mills
- No Strings (1974) - 1st Workman
- Thriller (1975) - 1st man in the pub
- Ripping Yarns (1977) - 1st Pressman
- It Ain't Half Hot Mum (1977) - Captain Owen
- Robin's Nest (1978) - Fred
- Come Back Mrs Noah (1978) - Mr. Noah
- Wodehouse Playhouse (1978) - P.C. Popjoy
- The Famous Five (1978) - Ben (the blacksmith)
- Danger UXB (1979) - ARP Man
- Sykes (1974-1979) - Leg Consultant
- George and Mildred (1976-1979) - Mr Clayton / Stanley / Ted / Pet Shop Assistant
- You're Only Young Twice (Series 3 - Episode Four - 21 June 1979) - "Use of Bath"- Landlord
- Yes Minister (1980) - the Mayor
- We, the Accused (1980) - Crompton
- Why Didn't They Ask Evans? (1980) - Constable Browning
- The Goodies (1971) "The Music Master" (ep 2.5)
- The Goodies (1973) "The Lost Island of Munga" (ep 3.5)
- Worzel Gummidge (1979-1980) - P.C. Parsons
- Keep It in the Family (1980-1982) - Piano Mover / Burt
- Are You Being Served? (1978-1983) - Customer / Wendel P. Clark
- Never the Twain (1986-1988) - Waldo / George
- All Creatures Great and Small (1988) - Mr. Birtwhistle
- You Rang, M'Lord? (1993) - Perkins
- Casualty (1994) - Johno Jenkins
- Last of the Summer Wine (1998) - Coggy Duckworth
