= The Moon Over the Alley =

1976 British film

- Theatrical film poster
- Directed by: Joseph Despins
- Written by: William Dumaresq
- Produced by: Joseph Despins; William Dumaresq
- Starring: Sean Caffrey; Debbie Evans; Norman Mitchell; Patrick Murray; Basil Clarke; Peter Farrell; Doris Fishwick
- Cinematography: Peter Hannan
- Edited by: Joseph Despins
- Music by: Galt MacDermot
- Release dates: April 2, 1976 (NDNFF); April 26, 1983 (USA)
- Running time: 107 mins.
- Country: United Kingdom
- Language: English

The Moon Over the Alley is a 1976 British experimental film, directed by Joseph Despins and written by William Dumaresq. The film stars Sean Caffrey, Basil Clarke, Debbie Evans, Peter Farrell, Doris Fishwick, Patrick Murray, and Norman Mitchell. It premiered in 1976 at the New Directors/New Films Festival. This same directing/writing team previously collaborated on another cult film, Duffer (1972).

== Synopsis ==
‘The Moon Over the Alley’ reunites the writer/director team of Joseph Despins and William Dumaresq. This quirky, London-set musical features a score by Galt MacDermot (‘Hair’).The film explores the various challenges faced by a multicultural group of residents living in a Notting Hill boarding house—a building slated for demolition. Dark and unsettling, yet simultaneously dreamlike and tender, this film defies easy categorization. It is available on DVD and Blu-ray as part of the BFI’s ‘Flipside’ collection.

== Cast ==
- Sean Caffrey as Jack MacMahon
- Vari Sylvester as June MacMahon
- Basil Clarke as Mr. Deray
- Debbie Evans as Katie
- Peter Farrell as Akki
- Doris Fishwick as Sybil
- Norman Mitchell as Joe Tudge
- Patrick Murray as Ronnie Gusset
- Erna May as Bertha Gusset
- Leroy Hyde as Jim
- Sharon Forrester as Belinda

== Reception ==
The New York Times calls this "a film with a nice eye for a little piece of London life". Nostalgia Central labels it a "strange London-set musical".

Kenneth George Godwin of Cagey Films lauds the film for "merely reflecting a community as it exists" in regards to its kitchen sink realism. And Shaquilla Alexander of So the Theory Goes said that there is "something slightly Shakespearean about the way" the film "explores the tales and tribulations of the damned".
