= Kathryn O'Reilly =

- Education: London Academy of Music and Dramatic Art
- Occupations: Actor, Playwright
- Website: www.kathryn-oreilly.com

Kathryn O'Reilly is a British actress and playwright.

== Early life and education ==
O'Reilly began acting in local youth theatre in Surrey before going to the National Youth Theatre of Great Britain.

O'Reilly attended the BRIT Performing Arts School. Whilst there, she also attended Anna Scher and Ken Campbell classes.

In 2008, O'Reilly trained from a Bachelor of Arts at the London Academy of Music and Dramatic Art (LAMDA). There, she won the original poetry writing competition two years consecutively; in 2007 with her poem Him and Me and in 2008 with Klink Klank Echoes that she performed with fellow classmate Gary Carr.

In her first year of training at LAMDA, she landed the role of Penny Collins in The Bill. In the second year, she started filming on the award-winning feature film Zebra Crossing directed by Sam Holland. She also acted in many productions at LAMDA, including: Breaking Barriers In Burnley, Twelfth Night, Blue Remembered Hills, After The Accident (directed by Edwina Casey), Peter Pan and Desdemona.

== Career ==
=== Theatre ===
O'Reilly's theatre work includes work with touring theatre company Out Of Joint. She gave over 318 performances playing Liz Morden in Timberlake Wertenbaker's Our Country's Good. She received positive reviews: Michael Billington of The Guardian said she was "hugely impressive as the flinty thief who ultimately saves her neck by discovering her voice"; Charles Spencer of The Telegraph said she gave "a brilliantly sparky and furious performance as one of the most disaffected prisoners"; TC Daily Planet Guthrie Theatre, Minneapolis described her performance as "prize-worthy" Time Out said that "the emotional blossoming of Kathryn O’Reilly’s hard-nosed Liz Morden is poignant and painful."; and The Standard said that she "is memorably intense as the sour Liz Morden, who rigidly resists authority."

=== Playwriting ===
O'Reilly's debut play was Screwed, which premiered at Theatre503 from June to July 2016. It was published by Nick Hern Books. It was directed by Sarah Meadows, who was nominated for an Offie for Best Director. The play was described by Tom Wicker of Time Out as “A witty look at female friendship in a broken society...An assured debut, at times sharply observed and bruisingly funny”. It also received a positive review from London Theatre, who called it a “very unpleasant and yet strangely compelling play”

O'Reilly's second play Poisoned Polluted premiered at Old Red Lion Theatre in 2019. It was published by Nick Hern Books. She starred in the play alongside Anna Doolan. Both actresses were nominated for the Offie for Best Female Performance on a Play.

== Performance history ==
=== Theatre ===
Year	Title	Role	Theatre	Company	Notes	Ref
	Close Quarters		Sheffield Crucible			
	A View From Islington North		Arts Theatre			
2012-13	Our Country's Good	Liz Morden	St James's Theatre			
2014		Liz Morden / Will Dawes	International tour	Out of Joint		
	Andersen's English		Hampstead Theatre			
	Mixed Up North		Wilton's Music Hall			
	YOU		(Argus Angel Winners at Brighton Fringe Festival)		By Mark Wilson, directed by Sarah Meadows, starring Stephen Myott-Meadows & Kathryn O'Reilly (Show of the Week Winners at Vault Festival)	
	Arms and the Man		Watford Palace Theatre		Directed by Brigid Larmour	
	Caught by Christopher Chen		Arcola Theatre		Directed by Cressida Brown. Nominated for an Offie.	
	Hamlet is dead. no gravity		Arcola Theatre			
	The Golden Dragon		Plymouth Theatre Royal			
	Love on the Tracks		Soho Theatre			
	Love on the Tracks		Redbridge Drama Centre			
	A Christmas Carol		Trafalgar Studios			
	Oedipus		Sheffield Crucible			
2012	Rift		Brewhouse Theatre		Granted the Inspire mark by the London 2012 Inspire programme	

== Filmography ==
=== Television ===
Year	Title	Role	Channel	Notes	Ref
	Grantchester				
	Call The Midwife				
	Holby City				
2022	The Watcher				
	Lewis V				
	The Bill				
	Rough Justice				
	Doctors				

=== Film ===
Year	Title	Role	Director		Notes	Ref
2008	Zebra Crossing			Crown Films	Winner of Raindance award	
2008	Cold Calling			Woolfcub films	Winner of Indie Short Film Competition	
2012	RANDOM			Channel 4 & Hillbilly Films	Winner of BAFTA 2012 best single drama	
2018	The Little Stranger		Lenny Abrahamson	Potboiler Films		
2019	Rare Beasts		Billie Piper			
	Los Jack Machine			Free Seed Films	Winner Best Shorts Awards; Nominated for outstanding cast performance AOF International film festival	
