= Once a Year on Blackpool Sands =

2021 British romantic drama film

- Theatrical film poster
- Directed by: Karlton Parris
- Written by: Karlton Parris
- Produced by: Karlton Parris
- Starring: Kyle Brookes; Macaulay Cooper; Dominic McCavish
- Cinematography: Joshua Gwynne
- Edited by: Joshua Gwynne
- Music by: David A. Jones
- Release date: 21 November 2021 (UK)
- Running time: 105 mins.
- Country: United Kingdom
- Language: English

Once a Year on Blackpool Sands is a 2021 British romantic drama film, written and directed by Karlton Parris. The film stars Kyle Brookes, Macaulay Cooper, and Dominic McCavish. It premiered in the United Kingdom in 2021.

== Synopsis ==
The story is a gritty northern LGBTQ comedy drama set in Blackpool in 1953. Two young gay Yorkshire miners, Eddy and Tommy, on their annual holiday there, meet transvestite James Elbridge who is summoning up the courage to do the fabled walk from pier to pier.

== Cast ==
- Kyle Brookes as Eddy Corkhill
- Macaulay Cooper as Tommy Price
- Dominic McCavish as James Elbridge / Phyllis
- Wendy Laurence James as Gladys Bracegirdle
- Linda Clark as Red Ethel
- Mollie Jones as Maureen Bracegirdle
- Elizabeth Coombs as Alice Price
- Mary Hooton as Agnes Corkhill
- Olivia Charlotte Cole as Susan Elbridge
- Kevin Stemp as Joey Price
- Joel McVeagh as Karlton
- Mark Cronfield as Mr. Black Pudding

== Background ==
This film is based on a true story, set in 1953 when gay bashing was rife, and the characters are based on real individuals. The story had previously been presented as a stage play.

== Reception ==
Ris Fatah of Queer Guru lauded the entire film: "Although some of the scenes are a little long and the script could do with a sharper edit, this is a warm, funny, sad, thought-provoking film and the strength of the casting, acting and characters will keep your attention." Fatah put the film in the context of "the tradition of kitchen sink dramas from that period." Neil Baker of Cinéorama rated the film 4/10 stars and opined about the discombobulated structure of the plot: "The result is a movie that swings from confusion to brilliance to disappointment as Parris attempts to weave British period drama with robust discussions on historical oppression and kitchen-sink social realism."
