= Gareth Jones (actor) =

British actor (1925–1958)

- Died: 30 November 1958
- Occupation: Actor, television actor

Gareth Jones (6 June 1925 – 30 November 1958) was a British actor, chiefly remembered for the circumstances of his death, during the transmission of a live television play, Underground, part of the Armchair Theatre series.

== Biography ==
Jones was born in Lampeter, Wales.

== Career ==
Jones appeared in Dundee Repertory Theatre plays including "Petticoat Influence" (1952), The Beaver Coat (1952), "The Hollow Crown" (1952), "The Queen's Husband" (1952), "Young Madame Conti" (1952), and The Lark (1955).

He also appeared in three other Armchair Theatre plays in 1958 - "Noon on Doomsday" (6 July 1958), "Trial By Candlelight" (22 June 1958), and "Miss Olive" (6 April 1958). Other TV appearances included the ITV Television Playhouse production of "Thunder on Sycamore Street" (11 October 1957), the BBC Television adaptation of Under Milk Wood (9 May 1957), the BBC series "Onion Boys" (1957), and "A Tale of Two Cities" (1957).

== Death ==
During a live television broadcast of the anthology series Armchair Theatre in the play Underground on the ITV network in the UK on 30 November 1958, Jones suffered a massive heart attack and died while off-camera between two of his scenes. Some contemporary news reports stated that he had suffered the heart attack while on camera, although most references claim that he was stricken while in a make-up chair, between scenes. However, actor Peter Bowles, also in the cast, recalled that "During transmission, a little group of us was talking on camera while awaiting the arrival of Gareth Jones's character, who had some information for us. We could see him coming up towards us, but we saw him fall. We had no idea what had happened, but he certainly wasn't coming our way".

Director Ted Kotcheff and the remaining cast were forced to improvise to carry the play to its conclusion, with producer Sydney Newman ordering Kotcheff to "shoot it like a football match". Coincidentally, Jones's character was to have suffered a fatal heart attack during the play.
