= Men of Tomorrow (1959 film) =

1959 British film by Alfred Travers

- Directed by: Alfred Travers
- Screenplay by: Vernon Greeves; Alfred Travers
- Starring: David Hemmings
- Production company: Border
- Release date: 1959
- Running time: 40 mins
- Country: United Kingdom
- Language: English

Men of Tomorrow is a 1959 British short feature film directed by Alfred Travers and starring Vernon Greeves and David Hemmings. It was written by Greeves and Travers.

== Plot ==
A young reporter investigates the reasons that under-privileged teenagers turn rebellious.

== Cast ==
- Vernon Greeves as Bill Hanley
- Janet Smith as Helen
- David Hemmings as Ted
