= Ted Kotcheff =

Canadian film and television director (1931–2025)

- Born: William Theodore Kotcheff; April 7, 1931; Toronto, Ontario, Canada
- Died: April 10, 2025 (aged 94); Nuevo Nayarit, Nayarit, Mexico
- Other names: William T. Kotcheff; Velichko Todorov Tsochev
- Citizenship: Canada; Bulgaria
- Occupations: Director; producer
- Years active: 1956–2012
- Spouses: Sylvia Kay (m. 1960; div. 1972): Laifun Chung
- Children: 5, including Thomas

William Theodore Kotcheff (Bulgarian: Величко Тодоров Цочев, romanized: Velichko Todorov Tsochev; April 7, 1931 – April 10, 2025) was a Canadian director and producer of film, television, and theatre. He worked at various times in Canada, the United Kingdom, and the United States. He was known for having directed such films as the seminal Australian New Wave picture Wake in Fright (1971), the Mordecai Richler adaptations The Apprenticeship of Duddy Kravitz (1974) and Joshua Then and Now (1985), the original Rambo film First Blood (1982), and the comedies Fun with Dick and Jane (1977), North Dallas Forty (1979), and Weekend at Bernie's (1989).

Kotcheff was nominated for a Genie Award for Best Achievement in Direction, a Gemini Award for Best Direction in a Dramatic Program or Mini-Series, and twice for the Cannes Film Festival's Palme d'Or. He won the Golden Bear at the 1974 Berlin International Film Festival for The Apprenticeship of Duddy Kravitz, and the British Academy Television Award for Best Drama Series for his work on Play for Today. He received the Directors Guild of Canada's Lifetime Achievement Award in 2011, and the Academy of Canadian Cinema & Television's Board of Directors' Tribute Award in 2014.

He was described by the Toronto International Film Festival as a "talented, multi-faceted journeyman director in the tradition of Leo McCarey or Robert Wise".

== Early life ==
William Theodore Kotcheff was born in Toronto in 1931, into a family of Bulgarian immigrants. His father was born in Plovdiv, and his mother was of Macedonian Bulgarian background, from a Vambel, Ottoman Empire (present-day Greece), but grew up in Varna, Bulgaria. The family's original surname was 'Tsochev' (Bulgarian: Цочев), but was later anglicized to Kotcheff. Kotcheff's Bulgarian name is Velichko Todorov Tsochev (Bulgarian: Величко Тодоров Цочев, [veˈlit͡ʃko toˈdɔrof ˈt͡sɔt͡ʃef]).

Kotcheff's first language was Bulgarian, which he learned before English, he ate Bulgarian food, and all his friends were Macedonian and Bulgarian. He saw no difference between Macedonian and Bulgarian, seeing both communities as one and the same. He served on the board of directors of the Macedonian Arts Council. He has said: "I love Bulgaria", "Bulgarians are my people" and "I have always felt like a Bulgarian".

During high school, Kotcheff worked at a Goodyear factory and in a slaughterhouse. He studied at University College, Toronto, graduating with a degree in English Literature in 1952.

== Career ==
=== Canadian television ===
Kotcheff began his television career at the age of twenty-four when he joined the staff of the Canadian Broadcasting Corporation, with television in its infancy. Kotcheff was the youngest director on the staff of the CBC, where he worked for two years on shows such as General Motors Theatre, Encounter, First Performance and On Camera.

=== British television ===
In 1957, he left Canada to live and work in England. He was soon followed by his compatriot Sydney Newman, who had been the Director of Drama at the CBC and then to England to take up a similar position at ABC Weekend TV, one of the franchise holders of the ITV network who also produced much of the nationally networked programming for the channel.

At ABC, Newman was producer of the popular Armchair Theatre anthology drama programme, on which Kotcheff worked as a director between 1957 and 1960. Kotcheff was responsible for directing some of the best-remembered instalments. During Underground, transmitted live on November 30, 1958, Kotcheff was required to cope when one of the actors, Gareth Jones, playing a character who was to die of a heart attack, suddenly died of one himself, off-camera, while between scenes, leaving Peter Bowles and others to improvise.

More successfully, Kotcheff directed the following year's No Trams to Lime Street by Welsh playwright Alun Owen. He also did Hour of Mystery, I'll Have You to Remember (1961) by Clive Exton, and episodes of BBC Sunday-Night Play, ITV Television Playhouse, Espionage, First Night, ABC Stage 67, Drama 61-67 and ITV Playhouse.

=== Theatre ===
Kotcheff also worked in the theatre. He directed the original 1964–65 West End production of the musical Maggie May at the Adelphi Theatre, which won the Ivor Novello Award for Outstanding Score of the Year and the Critics' Poll as Best New British Musical.

=== British feature films ===
Kotcheff made his first film with Tiara Tahiti (1962). He directed other features during the decade, including Life at the Top (1965) and Two Gentlemen Sharing (1969).

He also directed The Human Voice (1967) for British television, starring Ingrid Bergman from a story by Jean Cocteau and TV remakes of The Desperate Hours (1967) and Of Mice and Men (1968). He directed the concert At the Drop of Another Hat for TV.

Kotcheff directed the Australian film Wake in Fright (USA: Outback, 1971; re-released with its original title, 2012). It won much critical acclaim in Europe, and was Australia's entry at the Cannes Film Festival. (In 2009, Wake in Fright was re-released on DVD and Blu-ray disc in a fully restored version.)

Kotcheff returned to television, directing the Play for Today production Edna, the Inebriate Woman (1971) for the BBC, which won him a British Academy Television Award for Best Director. In 2000, the play was voted one of the 100 Greatest British Television Programmes of the 20th century in a poll of industry professionals conducted by the British Film Institute.

=== Return to Canada ===
Kotcheff returned home to Canada, where he directed an adaptation of his friend and one-time housemate Mordecai Richler's novel The Apprenticeship of Duddy Kravitz (1974) which won the Golden Bear at the Berlin Film Festival making it the first English Canadian dramatic feature film to win an international award. In 1975 the movie won the Canadian Film Awards' belated Film of the Year award (as the 1974 ceremony was not held). The film has since been recognized as a classic of Canadian cinema, with the Toronto International Film Festival ranking it in the Top 10 Canadian Films of All Time twice, in 1984 and 1993.

He wrote and directed The Trial of Sinyavsky and Daniel (1975) for Canadian television and was a production consultant on Why Shoot the Teacher? (1977).

=== Hollywood ===
In Hollywood, he directed Fun with Dick and Jane (1977) which was a big hit. He followed it with the comedy Who Is Killing the Great Chefs of Europe? (1978) then wrote and directed North Dallas Forty (1979) which was critically acclaimed.

Kotcheff directed the Canadian film Split Image (1982), then had his biggest success to date with the Sylvester Stallone movie First Blood (1982), the first in the Rambo series. (He speaks about the ideas behind this film in Andrea Luka Zimmerman's 2017 film Erase and Forget.) Kotcheff then worked on another Vietnam-themed action movie Uncommon Valor (1983), then returned to Canada to make Joshua Then and Now (1985), from the novel by Mordecai Richler.

Kotcheff directed Switching Channels (1988) and Winter People (1989), then had a big hit with Weekend at Bernie's (1989).

=== Television ===
In the 1990s, Kotcheff returned to directing for TV, working on various American series such as Red Shoe Diaries, and Buddy Faro as well as Casualty in the UK.

He did the occasional feature film such as Folks! (1992) and The Shooter (1995). He did TV movies like What Are Families for? (1993), Love on the Run (1994), Family of Cops (1995), A Husband, a Wife and a Lover (1996), Borrowed Hearts (1997), Cry Rape (1999). He joined the staff of Law & Order: Special Victims Unit, where he worked as an executive producer and director through 2012.

== Personal life ==
Kotcheff lived in Beverly Hills with his wife Laifun (nee Chung). They had two children: Alexandra, a filmmaker, and Thomas, a composer and pianist. He had three children from his previous marriage to actress Sylvia Kay: Aaron, Katrina and Joshua. Ted Kotcheff was a vegetarian.

In May and June 2013, he was invited to the Film Forum in New York City for a re-release of his film The Apprenticeship of Duddy Kravitz, restored by the Academy of Canadian Cinema & Television.

In February 2016, Kotcheff applied for Bulgarian citizenship via the Bulgarian consulate in Los Angeles, and was granted this during a visit to Bulgaria in March.

=== Death ===
Kotcheff died from heart failure in Nuevo Vallarta, Nayarit, Mexico, on April 10, 2025, three days after his 94th birthday.

== Filmography ==
=== Director (Film) ===
- Tiara Tahiti (1962)
- Life at the Top (1965)
- Two Gentlemen Sharing (1969)
- Wake in Fright (1971)
- The Apprenticeship of Duddy Kravitz (1974)
- Billy Two Hats (1974)
- Fun with Dick and Jane (1977)
- Who Is Killing the Great Chefs of Europe? (1978)
- North Dallas Forty (1979)
- Split Image (1982)
- First Blood (1982)
- Uncommon Valor (1983)
- Joshua Then and Now (1985)
- Switching Channels (1988)
- Weekend at Bernie's (1989)
- Winter People (1989)
- Folks! (1992)
- The Shooter (1995)

=== Director (Television) ===
- On Camera (1956) - as W.T. Kotcheff
- Hour of Mystery (1957)
- Underground (1958)
- No Trams to Lime Street (1959)
- After the Funeral (1960)
- Lena, O My Lena (1960)
- I'll Have You Remember (1961)
- BBC Sunday-Night Play (1962-1963)
- ITV Television Playhouse (1963)
- Espionage (1963)
- Land of My Dreams (1964)
- First Night (1963–1964)
- Drama 64 (1964)
- Armchair Theatre (1958-1964)
- The Human Voice (1967)
- The Desperate Hours (1967)
- Edna, the Inebriate Woman (1971)
- What Are Families for? (1993)
- Red Shoe Diaries 3: Another Woman's Lipstick (1993)
- Love on the Run (1994)
- A Family of Cops (1995)
- Red Shoe Diaries 5: Weekend Pass (1995)
- A Husband, a Wife and a Lover (1996)
- Borrowed Hearts (1997)
- Buddy Faro (1998)
- Law & Order: Special Victims Unit (1999-2012)
- Crime in Connecticut: The Story of Alex Kelly (1999)

== Awards and honours ==
| Year | Award | Category | Film | Result |
|---|---|---|---|---|
| 1971 | Cannes Film Festival | Grand Prix du Festival International du Film | Wake in Fright | Nominated |
| 1972 | British Academy Television Awards | Best Drama Production | Play for Today: "Edna, the Inebriate Woman" | Won |
| 1974 | Berlin International Film Festival | Golden Bear | The Apprenticeship of Duddy Kravitz | Won |
| 1975 | Canadian Film Awards | Film of the Year | The Apprenticeship of Duddy Kravitz | Won |
| 1985 | Cannes Film Festival | Palme d'Or | Joshua Then and Now | Nominated |
| 1986 | Genie Awards | Best Director | Joshua Then and Now | Nominated |
| 1989 | Deauville Film Festival | Critics Award | Weekend at Bernie's | Nominated |
| 1998 | Gemini Awards | Best TV Movie or Dramatic Mini-Series | Borrowed Hearts | Nominated |
| 2011 | Directors Guild of Canada | Lifetime Achievement Award | —N/a | Won |
| 2011 | Oldenburg International Film Festival | German Independence Honorary Award | —N/a | Won |
| 2014 | Chicago International Film Festival | Gold Hugo for Best Short Film | Fearless | Nominated |
| 2014 | Canadian Screen Awards | Academy Board of Directors' Tribute | —N/a | Won |
| 2018 | 22nd Independent Publisher Book Awards | Performing Arts (Silver) | Director's Cut: My Life in Film | Won |
