= Zebra Crossing (film) =

2008 British film

- Theatrical film poster
- Directed by: Sam Holland
- Written by: Sam Holland
- Produced by: Anastasia Atanesyan
- Starring: Lee Turnbull; Greg Wakeham; Kyle Treslove; Kathryn O'Reilly
- Cinematography: Lucio Cremonese; Sam Holland
- Edited by: Sam Holland; Justin Krish
- Music by: Holley Gray
- Release dates: October 11, 2008 (Raindance); January 28, 2011 (UK)
- Running time: 93 mins.
- Country: United Kingdom
- Language: English

Zebra Crossing is a 2008 British gang drama-thriller film, written, directed, co-edited, and co-shot by Sam Holland. The film stars Lee Turnbull, Greg Wakeham, Kathryn O'Reilly, and Kyle Treslove. It premiered at the Raindance Film Festival in 2008, before being released in the UK in 2011.

== Plot ==
"From the moment I was born I cried for a month..." Eighteen years on, and Justin is no nearer the truth. And in a world that increasingly doesn't care, maybe just simply relying on friendship is not enough? Especially with friends like Billy, Sean and Tommy. Set amongst the backdrop of the towering, concrete-clad estates of south London 'Zebra Crossings' blends a diverse mixture of characters that all share one thing in common: The incredible loneliness of living alongside 7 million other people. Blending the surreal, and very real, we take an intense journey in search of friendship, belief and religion. With a lacklustre father and estranged mother, Justin's only source of perennial control comes from an unlikely source, his bed-ridden sister Suzanne. But Justin needs is a real mentor, a father figure, someone who can provide guidance before it's all too late. In steps Marcus, unlike anyone Justin has ever known before, calm, soft, assured - but does he want something from Justin? Meanwhile, Tommy's abandonment issues haunt him once again, and his class-A drug addiction has sent him into full destruction mode. Also, the pressure from a rival gang has reached exploding point - as there is certainly no space for two crews in this neighbourhood. Justin must find the answer to it all, and quick.

== Cast ==
- Lee Turnbull as Justin
- Greg Wakeham as Tommy
- Aaron White as Sean
- Kyle Treslove as Billy
- Kathryn O'Reilly as Suzanne
- Michael Maris as Marcus
- Annie Burkin as Donna
- Ashley David as Danny

== Reception ==
Simon Crook of Empire awarded the film 3/5 stars, stating "Sam Holland's debut plays like La Haine with the kitchen sink thrown in, a British urban-oblivion pic with a tough, raw cast and electric tension."

Jeff Robson of Eye for Film gives it 3.5/5 stars, calling it a "visceral and unrelenting debut" in which Holland "coaxes excellent performances from his young cast, too, especially Lee Turnbull and the scarily believable Greg Wakeham".

Meanwhile, Patrick Mulcahy of Letterboxd rated it 1.5/5 stars, calling it "a Boyz n the Hood rip-off" that is "depressing".
