= Lena, O My Lena =

1960 British television film

- Directed by: Ted Kotcheff
- Written by: Alun Owen
- Produced by: Sydney Newman
- Starring: Peter McEnery; Billie Whitelaw; Scott Forbes; Jeanne Hepple; Colin Blakely; Patrick O'Connell
- Release date: September 25, 1960 (UK)
- Running time: 60 mins.
- Country: United Kingdom
- Language: English

Lena, O My Lena is a 1960 British drama television featurette, directed by Ted Kotcheff and written by Alun Owen. The film stars Peter McEnery, Billie Whitelaw, Scott Forbes, and Colin Blakely. It premiered in 1960 on Armchair Theatre in the UK.

== Synopsis ==
Tom, a sensitive Liverpool student, takes a job on a loading dock in a Lancashire factory town. He becomes smitten with a girl named Lena who works in the machine shop next door, and despite a bullying driver who claims her for herself, he manages to take her out on a date.

== Cast ==
- Peter McEnery as David
- Billie Whitelaw as Sarah
- Scott Forbes as Gerry
- Jeanne Hepple as Peggy
- Colin Blakely as Ted
- Patrick O'Connell as Derek

== Reception ==
Mark Cunliffe of The Geek Show said this episode evoked "kitchen sink drama" and "a new commitment to naturalism". He also praised the performances of Billie Whitelaw, Peter McEnery, and Colin Blakely. Stuart McLean of My Reviewer, in a compilation of Armchair Theatre reviews, lauded writer Alun Owen's trilogy. Mark Duguid of BFI's Screenonline called it "the archetypal television drama of the period".
