= Five Clues to Fortune =

1957 British children's film

- German DVD
- Directed by: Joe Mendoza
- Screenplay by: Joe Mendoza
- Produced by: Frank A. Hoare
- Starring: John Rogers; Roberta Paterson; Peter Godsell
- Cinematography: A.T. Dinsdale
- Edited by: Leslie A. Parry
- Music by: Max Saunders
- Production company: Merton Park
- Release date: 1956
- Running time: 18 minutes
- Country: United Kingdom
- Language: English

Five Clues to Fortune (also known as The Treasure of Woburn Abbey) is a 1957 British children's crime film written and directed by Joe Mendoza and starring David Hemmings, John Rogers and Roberta Paterson.

In addition to its brief theatrical release, the film aired as an 8-part serial and a 2-part TV film on the ARD in Germany in 1964.

== Plot ==
Four children attempt to prevent an aristocrat’s secretary from secretly selling the aristocrat’s country house.

== Episodes ==
- 1 – "Dead Man's Treasure"
- 2 – "The Secret of the Antler"
- 3 – "Raiders at Midnight"
- 4 – "A Tight Spot"
- 5 – "Race Against Time"
- 6 – *"Stampede".
- 7 – "The Fifth Clue"
- 8 – "The Treasure Chest"

== Cast ==
- John Rogers as Michael
- Roberta Paterson as Jill
- Peter Godsell as Mark
- David Hemmings as Ken
- Dafydd Havard as Jonas
- Norman Mitchell as Bert
- David Cameron as Mr King
- Peter Welch as Mr Strong
- Philippa Hiatt as Mrs Strong

== Production ==
It was produced by Merton Park Studios for the Children's Film Foundation.The film's score was composed by Max Saunders and Jack Beaver.

Notably, this film marked David Hemmings' first screen appearance at the age of 12.

== Reception ==
The Monthly Film Bulletin wrote: "Previous C.F.F. Productions have possessed qualities often rare in more ambitious films intended for adult consumption. Here the playing of the children is less natural than usual and the material somewhat stale. A number of obvious studio shots jar with other scenes, taken at Woburn itself."

Kine Weekly wrote: "That grand old standby, hidden treasure, provides the material for the plot which is well-knit and moves quickly and effectively. The setting, however, is quite out of the ordinary, for the story of a search by children for the treasure of Woburn Abbey is set in that stateliest of stately homes. Much of the picture was shot in the Abbey and its park with its fine collection of wild animals, and the glimpses of the artistic treasures are notable in themselves. The four children who seek the Abbot's treasure are played with commendable naturalness by John Rogers, Roberta Paterson, Peter Godsell and David Hemmings. David Cameron plays a suave but villainous ducal secretary with conviction and two minor villains in the comic tradition are effectively portrayed by Daflyd Havard and Norman Mitchell. Direction and photography are of high quality, and taken all in all, this serial, which was produced at Merton Park Studios for the Children's Film Foundation, is a natural for children."

The Daily Film Renter wrote: "The makers of this exciting serial know to a nicety what children enjoy, and supply it to them in full measure. There's plenty of action: each episode ends on a fine note of tension; and there's a leavening of humour – mostly at the expense of silly grown-ups. Performances are convincing, general production values very good, and the product as a whole is bound to appeal to the youthful audiences for which it is intended."
