= Underground (Armchair Theatre) =

- Armchair Theatre episode
- Episode no.: Series 3 Episode 12
- Directed by: Ted Kotcheff
- Written by: James Forsyth
- Original air date: 30 November 1958

Guest appearances
- Donald Houston; Ian Curry; Patricia Jessel; Warren Mitchell; Peter Bowles; Gareth Jones

"Underground" was a science-fiction television play presented as part of the British anthology series Armchair Theatre which was broadcast live by the ITV commercial network on 30 November 1958. It is chiefly remembered for actor Gareth Jones suffering a fatal heart attack during transmission, meaning the play's final act was partly improvised to accommodate his sudden absence.

Written by dramatist James Forsyth (1913–2005) and based on a novel by Harold Rein, the play depicted survivors from a nuclear holocaust living in the London Underground. It featured actors Donald Houston, Ian Curry, Patricia Jessel, Warren Mitchell, Peter Bowles and Jones.

A little over halfway through the production, Gareth Jones complained of feeling unwell while off-set in make-up between two of his scenes, and then suddenly collapsed and died as he was about to continue. His character was due to die from a heart attack during the course of the play. Peter Bowles recalled many years later: "During transmission, a little group of us was talking on camera while awaiting the arrival of Gareth Jones's character, who had some information for us. We could see him coming up towards us, but we saw him fall. We had no idea what had happened, but he certainly wasn't coming our way. The actors started making up lines, 'I'm sure if so-and-so were here he would say'..."

Producer Sydney Newman instructed director Ted Kotcheff to continue with the play and "shoot it like a football match", meaning to follow the characters around as they improvised a way of coping with the missing cast member. Kotcheff hurriedly re-structured the story during a commercial break in order to be able to bring the play to an end without the missing character being noticed by the audience.

While Kotcheff was on the studio floor, the inexperienced production assistant Verity Lambert, later to become the founding producer of Doctor Who, directed camera movements from the studio gallery.

The actors were not informed that Jones had died until after the play had finished. Houston was a close friend and it was thought he would have been unable to continue if he had known.

No recording of this play exists, as live television transmissions at the time were not automatically recorded or preserved (See Wiping).
