= Lee Turnbull (actor) =

British actor

Lee Turnbull is a British actor who has appeared in The Famous Five, Making Waves and The Bill. He appeared on stage at the Old Red Lion in 2004 as part of the cast of Cherry Picnic.In 2010 he toured the U.S. with 360 Ent's production of Peter Pan. After two years of touring he decided to move Stateside permanently. He then went on to write and direct the award-winning play 'Love Is' that premiered at the Hollywood Fringe Festival where he subsequently won the International Award for best play. He now coaches soccer full time.

== Selected screen credits ==
- The Street (2010)
- Zebra Crossing (2008) - Justin
- Cass (2008) - Male Diner
- Waking the Dead - Francis Duggan
- Holby Blue - Darren Edgar
- Border Work (2007) - Rob
- Wire in the Blood - Danny Ellis
- Hole in the Heart (2006) - Danny Ellis
- The Bill - Ben Thompson
- Over the Hill (2001) - Jason Wyatt
- Set-Up (1999) - Michael Finney
- Casualty - Martin Hooper
- Worlds Apart (2006) - Martin Hooper
- Shameless - Randy Soldier
- Making Waves - OM Mickey Sobanski
- The Vice - Ricky
- Gameboys (2003) TV episode - Ricky
- Shooters (2002) - Runners kid
- Lloyd & Hill (2001) - Dave Britten
- Hope & Glory - Tom Warrior
- The Railway Children (2000) - Draper's Boy
- Reach for the Moon (2000) TV mini-series
- Holby City - Peter Jenkins
- Silent Witness - Todd
- A Kind of Justice (1999) TV episode - Todd
- The Famous Five - Sniffer
- Five Go to Mystery Moor (1996) TV episode - Sniffer
- No Bananas (1996) TV mini-series - Richard
- The Vet - Matthew Cronin
- Nothing But the Truth (1995) - Matthew Cronin
- Willie's War (1994) - Willie
