= David Hemmings Happens =

Studio album by David Hemmings
- Released: September 1967
- Recorded: 1967
- Genre: Folk rock; pop rock
- Label: MGM
- Producer: Jim Dickson

David Hemmings chronology
David Hemmings Happens (1967)	Journey to the Centre of the Earth (1974)

Singles from David Hemmings Happens
- 1. ""Back Street Mirror"" Released: 1967

David Hemmings Happens is the debut studio album by British actor David Hemmings, released in September 1967 on MGM Records. Hemmings had sung with the English Opera Group as a boy soprano before becoming an actor. The album was available in both mono and stereo, catalogue numbers MGM E/SE 4490.

David Hemmings Happens was produced by Jim Dickson and arranged by Jimmy Bond. The album was recorded in Los Angeles with guitarist Roger McGuinn and bassist Chris Hillman of the Byrds and drummer Ed Thigpen of the Oscar Peterson Trio. The album includes covers of Tim Hardin's "Reason To Believe" and Bill Martin's "After The Rain"; the other songs were co-written or arranged by Hemmings.

== Release ==
The album failed to chart on the Billboard 200. The only single released from the album, the Gene Clark-penned "Back Street Mirror", did not chart on the Billboard Hot 100.

David Hemmings Happens was released on CD in its entirety for the first time on Rev-Ola Records (CD Rev 74) in August 2004.

== Track listing ==
=== Side 1 ===
1. "Back Street Mirror" (Gene Clark) - 3:23
2. "Reason To Believe" (Tim Hardin) - 2:06
3. "Good King James" (David Hemmings, Bill Martin, Roger McGuinn) - 3:55
4. "Bell Birds" (Traditional; new words and arrangement David Hemmings) - 2:30
5. "Talkin' LA" (David Hemmings, Roger McGuinn, Chris Hillman) - 7:19

=== Side 2 ===
1. "Anathea" (Traditional; new words and arrangement David Hemmings, Roger McGuinn, Jimmy Bond) - 3:09
2. "After The Rain" (Bill Martin) - 2:39
3. "War's Mystery" (David Hemmings, Roger McGuinn, Chris Hillman) - 6:27
4. "The Soldier Wind" (Bill Martin) - 2:18
