= David Hemmings =

English actor and director (1941–2003)

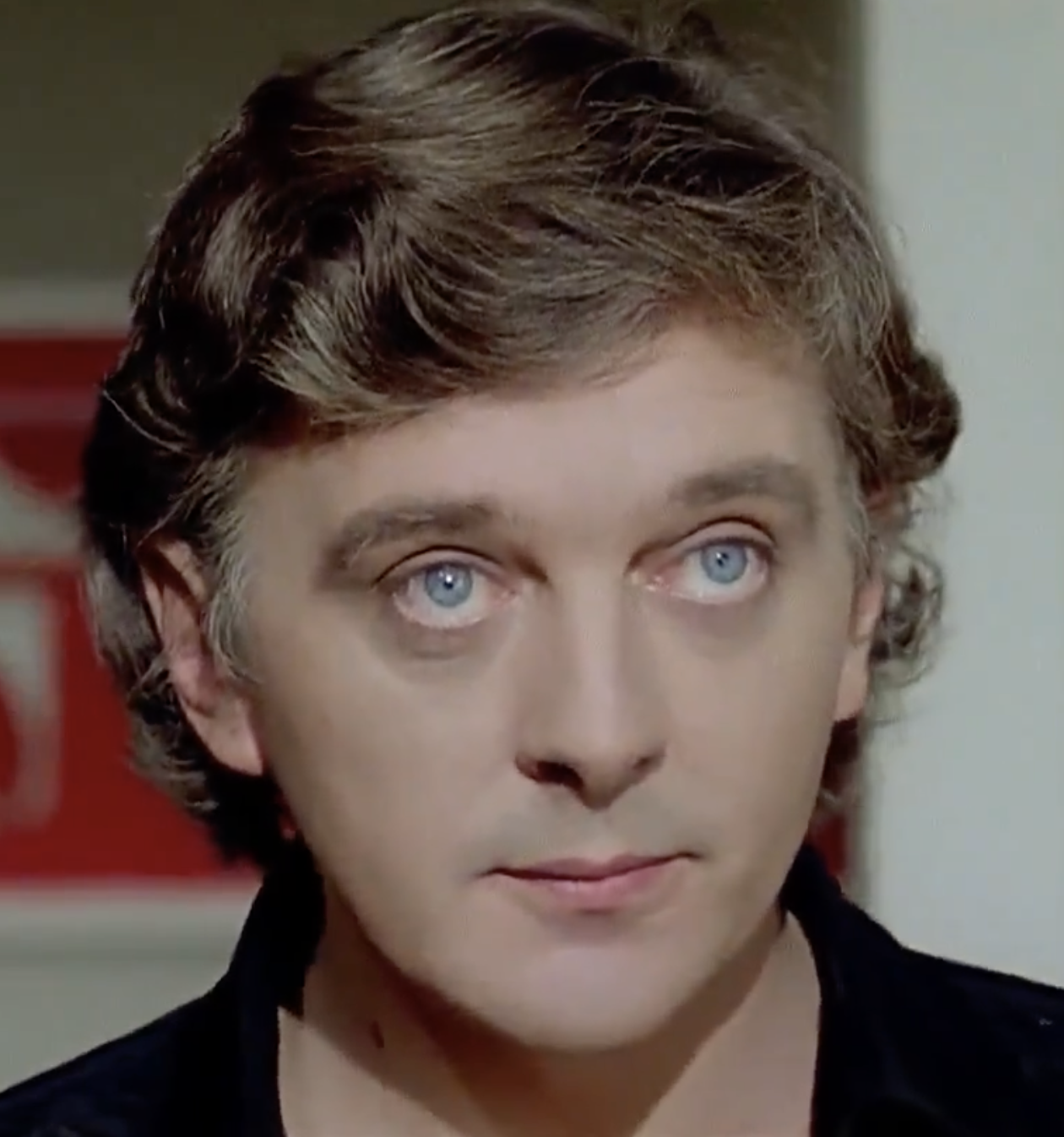
- Hemmings in Deep Red (1975)
- Born: David Leslie Edward Hemmings; 18 November 1941; Guildford, Surrey, England
- Died: 3 December 2003 (aged 62); Bucharest, Romania
- Resting place: St Peter Churchyard, Blackland, Wiltshire, England
- Education: Glyn Grammar School
- Occupations: Actor; director; producer
- Years active: 1954–2003
- Spouses: Genista Ouvry (m. 1960; div. 1967) Gayle Hunnicutt (m. 1968; div. 1975) Prudence de Casembroot (m. 1976; div. 1997) Lucy Williams (m. 2002)
- Children: 6, including Nolan

David Leslie Edward Hemmings (18 November 1941 – 3 December 2003) was an English actor, director, and producer of film and television. Originally trained as a boy soprano in operatic roles, he began appearing in films as a child actor in the 1950s. He became an icon of Swinging London for his portrayal of a trendy fashion photographer in the critically acclaimed film Blowup (1966), directed by Michelangelo Antonioni.

During the 1960s and 70s, Hemmings played both leading roles and major supporting parts in films like Camelot (1967), The Charge of the Light Brigade (1968), Barbarella (also 1968), Alfred the Great (1969), The Walking Stick (1970), Juggernaut (1974), Deep Red (1975), Islands in the Stream (1977), and The Prince and the Pauper (also 1977). In 1967, he co-founded the Hemdale Film Corporation with John Daly.

From the late 1970s on, Hemmings appeared mainly in supporting roles, and increasingly as a director. His second feature film, The 14 (1973), won the Silver Bear at the 23rd Berlin International Film Festival. He directed the cult horror film The Survivor (1981) in Australia. After moving to the United States in the 1980s, he directed episodes of television series like Magnum, P.I. and The A-Team. He continued acting in major motion pictures, notably Gladiator (2000), Spy Game (2001), and Gangs of New York (2002), until his death in 2003.

== Early life ==
David Hemmings was born in Guildford, Surrey, to a father who was a biscuit salesman, and a mother who was a homemaker.

=== Benjamin Britten ===
His education at Alleyn's School, Glyn Grammar School in Ewell and the Arts Educational Schools led him to music performance at the start of his career. He sang as a boy soprano in several works by composer Benjamin Britten, who formed a close friendship with him at this time. Most notably Hemmings created the role of Miles in Britten's chamber opera Turn of the Screw (1954). His intimate yet non-sexual relationship with Britten is described in John Bridcut's book Britten's Children (2006).

Although many commentators identified Britten's relationship with Hemmings as based on an infatuation, throughout his life Hemmings maintained categorically that Britten's conduct with him was beyond reproach at all times. Hemmings had earlier played the title role in Britten's The Little Sweep (1952), which was part of Britten's Let's Make an Opera! children's production.

Britten's interest in Hemmings ceased abruptly from the moment his voice broke, which occurred unexpectedly while he was singing the aria 'Malo' during a performance of The Turn of the Screw in 1956 in Paris. Britten was furious, waved Hemmings away, and never had any further contact with him.

== Acting ==
=== Early career ===
Hemmings then moved on to acting in films. He made his first film appearance in the drama film The Rainbow Jacket (1954). He also appeared in Saint Joan (1957).

Hemmings had bigger roles in Five Clues to Fortune (1957), The Heart Within (1957) and No Trees in the Street (1959), directed by J. Lee Thompson. He also had roles in Men of Tomorrow (1959), In the Wake of a Stranger (1959), Sink the Bismarck! (1960) and The Wind of Change (1961).

Hemmings began to be known for playing young men, for example in The Painted Smile (1962) and Some People (1962). His first lead role was in the low budget teen musical Live It Up! (1963), then he had support roles for Michael Winner's The System (1964). After this, he starred in a sequel to Live It Up!, Be My Guest (1965) and in the same year in Two Left Feet with Michael Crawford.

=== Blowup and stardom ===
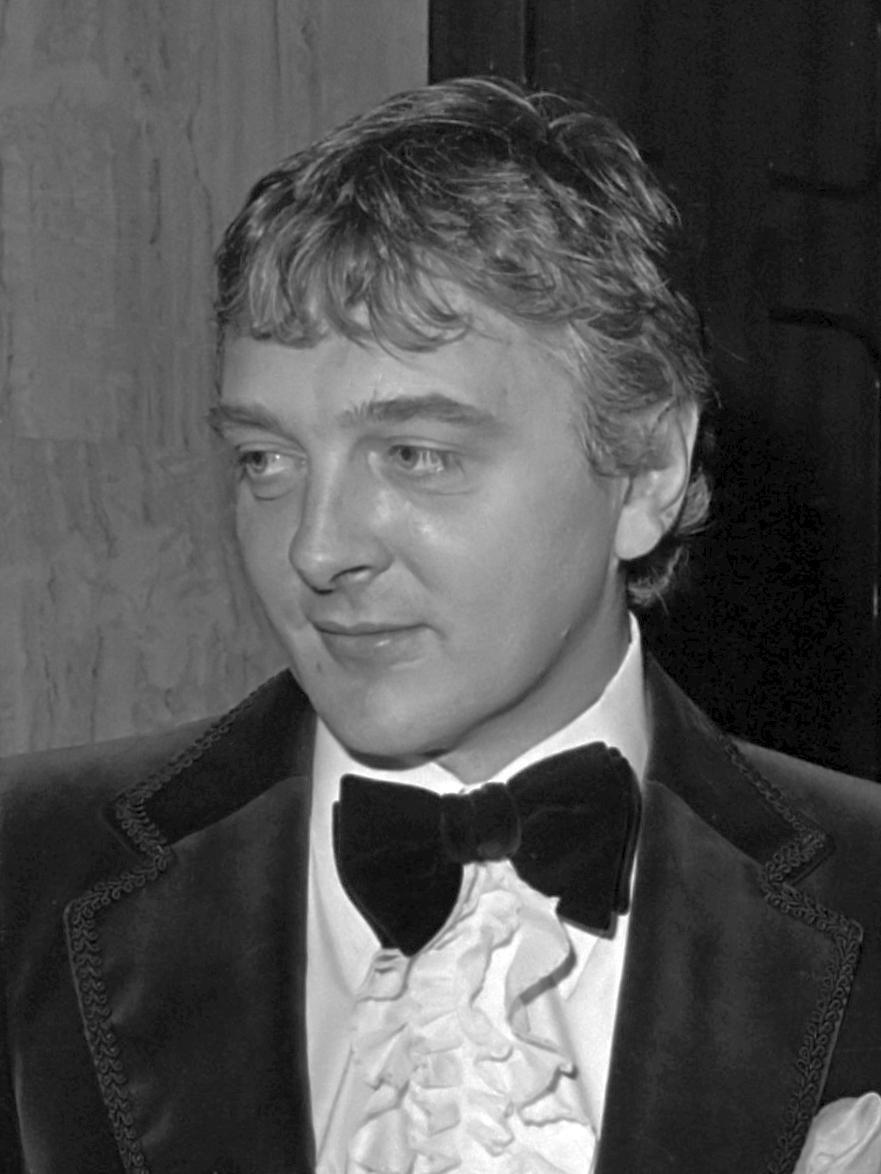
Hemmings in 1976

Hemmings’ luck changed when he was cast in the lead of Blowup (1966). It was directed by Michelangelo Antonioni, who detested the "Method" way of acting. He sought a fresh young face for the lead in the film. He found Hemmings, at the time acting in small-stage theatre in London, although at their first meeting Antonioni told Hemmings, "You look wrong. You're too young." Hemmings was offered the part of the protagonist, a London fashion photographer who accidentally photographs evidence of a murder, after Sean Connery turned the role down because Antonioni would not show him the full script but only a seven-page treatment stored in a cigarette packet.

The resulting film was a critical and commercial sensation for MGM, which financed it, and helped turn Hemmings and Vanessa Redgrave into stars. "I've been discovered half a dozen times," said Hemmings. "This time I think I've made it."

After Blowup Hemmings accepted an offer from Warner Bros to play Mordred in the big-budget film of the Broadway musical Camelot (1967), reuniting him with Vanessa Redgrave, which was a success. He had a supporting part in the thriller Eye of the Devil (1966), playing the brother of Sharon Tate. Hemmings was then cast as Louis Nolan in the big-budget epic The Charge of the Light Brigade (1968), which failed to recoup its cost.

Around 1967 Hemmings was briefly considered for the role of Alex in a film version of Anthony Burgess's novel A Clockwork Orange (1962), which was to be based on a screen treatment by satirist Terry Southern and British photographer Michael Cooper. Cooper and the Rolling Stones were reportedly upset by the move and it was decided to return to the original plan in which Mick Jagger, the lead vocalist of the Rolling Stones, would play Alex, with the rest of the Stones as his droog gang; the production was shelved after Britain's chief censor, the Lord Chamberlain, indicated that he would not permit it to be made.

Hemmings costarred with Richard Attenborough in the crime comedy, Only When I Larf (1968), then was the sole star of an anti-war film, The Long Day's Dying (1968). Both films flopped. More financially successful was the science fiction sex comedy Barbarella (1968), starring Jane Fonda in which Hemmings had a key supporting role. He played the lead in two period films for MGM: a comedy, The Best House in London (1969), and the historical epic Alfred the Great (1969), in which Hemmings had the title role. Neither film did well at the box office, with Alfred the Great being a notable flop.

Hemmings was cast in further lead roles at the start of the 1970s : The Walking Stick (1970) with Samantha Eggar for MGM; Fragment of Fear (1970), a thriller co-starring his then-wife Gayle Hunnicutt; and Unman, Wittering and Zigo (1971). He went to Hollywood to play a supporting role in The Love Machine (1971), starring John Phillip Law and Dyan Cannon. Back in Britain he starred in a horror film, Voices (1973), his second film with Gayle Hunnicutt. He went to Spain to appear in Lola (1974) and in Britain supported Richard Harris in Juggernaut (1974).

Hemmings appeared in the Italian giallo film Profondo Rosso (also known as Deep Red or The Hatchet Murders) (1975) directed by Dario Argento. Back in England he supported Anthony Newley in Mister Quilp (1975).

=== Director ===
Hemmings first turned to directing with Running Scared (1972), an adaptation of an American novel by Gregory Mcdonald for which Hemmings also co-wrote the script, resetting the story from Harvard to Cambridge University. He directed the drama film The 14 (1973), which won the Silver Bear at the 23rd Berlin International Film Festival.

Hemmings directed David Bowie, Marlene Dietrich, and Kim Novak in the drama film Schöner Gigolo, armer Gigolo (also known as Just a Gigolo) (1978). The film was poorly received, with Bowie describing it as "my 32 Elvis Presley films rolled into one".

On David Bowie's Stage tour in 1978 Hemmings filmed two of the three concerts at the Earls Court Arena in London on 30 June and 1 July. The rough cut was shown to Bowie, who didn't like it and the footage is since then unpublished.

Later, after relocating to Hollywood, he directed a number of television films and series episodes.

=== Character actor ===
From the mid-1970s on, Hemmings's acting work was mainly in supporting roles. In 1977 he appeared as Eddy in the film Islands in the Stream, an adaptation of Hemingway's novel of the same name, starring George C Scott. He also had support roles in The Squeeze (1977), The Prince and the Pauper (1977), The Heroin Busters (1977), The Disappearance (1977), Swindle (1977), Blood Relatives (1978), Power Play (1978) and Murder by Decree (1979). He also returned to television in 1978 with a film for Granada TV directed by Ken Russell and written by Melvyn Bragg: The Rime of the Ancient Mariner, about Samuel Taylor Coleridge (played by Hemmings), was the second of two films in the Clouds of Glory series about poets.

=== Australia and New Zealand ===
In 1979, Hemmings received an offer to play a supporting role in an Australian vampire film, Thirst. He starred in a TV film, Charlie Muffin then returned to Australia to feature in Harlequin (1980).

Hemmings then received an offer from Antony I. Ginnane to direct the Australian horror film The Survivor (1981), based on James Herbert's 1976 novel of the same name, starring Robert Powell and Jenny Agutter. Hemmings directed Race for the Yankee Zephyr shot in New Zealand.

While in New Zealand Hemmings played roles in Prisoners (1981) and Beyond Reasonable Doubt (1982).

=== Hollywood ===
Hemmings then moved to Hollywood. He played supporting roles in Man, Woman and Child (1983) and the television series Airwolf (1984).

He also worked extensively as a director of television programmes, including the action-adventure drama series Quantum Leap (e.g. the series’ premiere); the crime series Magnum, P.I. (in which he also played characters in several episodes); and two action-adventure series, The A-Team (in which he also played an uncredited cameo role in one of the episodes he directed), and Airwolf (in which he also played the role of Doctor Charles Henry Moffet, twisted creator of Airwolf, in the pilot and the second-season episode "Moffett's Ghost" – a typographical error by the studio's titles unit). He once joked "People thought I was dead. But I wasn't. I was just directing The A-Team."

Hemmings also directed the puzzle-contest video Money Hunt: The Mystery of the Missing Link (1984). He directed (and acted in) the television film The Key to Rebecca (1985), an adaptation of Ken Follett's 1980 novel of the same name. He also briefly served as a producer on the NBC crime-drama television series Stingray.

He directed the drama film Dark Horse (1992) and as an actor returned to the voyeuristic preoccupations of his Blowup character with a plum part as the Big Brother-esque villain in the series-three opener for the television horror anthology series Tales From the Crypt.

=== Later years ===
In later years he had roles that included Cassius in the historical epic film Gladiator (2000), with Russell Crowe, and in the drama film Last Orders (2001) and the spy film Spy Game (2001). He appeared as Mr Schermerhorn in the historical film Gangs of New York (2002), directed by Martin Scorsese.

His last screen appearances included the science-fiction action film Equilibrium (2002), , the superhero film The League of Extraordinary Gentlemen (2003), with Sean Connery, and as Frank Sinatra's attorney in the 2003 Australian film The Night We Called It a Day, a comedy based on true events. He also appeared in the horror film Blessed (2004) with Heather Graham, which was dedicated to his memory after a fatal heart attack while on set.

== Recording career ==
In 1967, Hemmings recorded a pop single, "Back Street Mirror" (written by Gene Clark), and a studio album, David Hemmings Happens, in Los Angeles. The album featured instrumental backing by several members of the Byrds, and was produced by Byrds' mentor Jim Dickson.

In the 1970s, he was jointly credited with former Easybeats members Harry Vanda and George Young as a co-composer of the song "Pasadena". The original 1973 recording of this song – the first Australian hit for singer John Paul Young – was produced by Simon Napier-Bell, in whose SNB Records label Hemmings was a partner at the time.

Hemmings also later provided the narration for Rick Wakeman's progressive-rock album Journey to the Centre of the Earth (1974) – an adaptation of Jules Verne's science-fiction novel A Journey to the Center of the Earth (1864) – which was recorded live.

He starred as Bertie Wooster in the short-lived Andrew Lloyd Webber musical, Jeeves (1975), for which an original cast album was released.

== Autobiography ==
After his death his autobiography, Blow Up... and Other Exaggerations – The Autobiography of David Hemmings, was published in 2004.

== Personal life ==
Hemmings was married four times: to Genista Ouvry (1960–1967), actress Gayle Hunnicutt (1968–1975), Prudence de Casembroot (1976–1997), and Lucy Williams (2002 to his death). Hemmings met Hunnicutt while he was in America promoting Blowup, by which time his marriage to Ouvry was over. At their outdoor wedding, Henry Mancini conducted an orchestra and the Mamas and the Papas performed next to a swimming pool filled with doves dyed puce. Of his marriage with Hunnicutt, Hemmings remarked, "We were the poor man's Taylor and Burton". Their marriage ended when Hunnicutt discovered Hemmings's affairs with actress Samantha Eggar (his co-star in The Walking Stick (1970), and his secretary Prudence de Casembroot.

During his subsequent marriage to de Casembroot, Hemmings continued to have extra-marital relationships with, among others, Tessa Dahl.

Hemmings had six children altogether; he and Ouvry had a daughter, he and Hunnicutt had a son (actor Nolan Hemmings), while he and de Casembroot had three sons and a daughter.

Hemmings was an active supporter of liberal causes, and spoke at a number of meetings on behalf of the UK's Liberal Party.

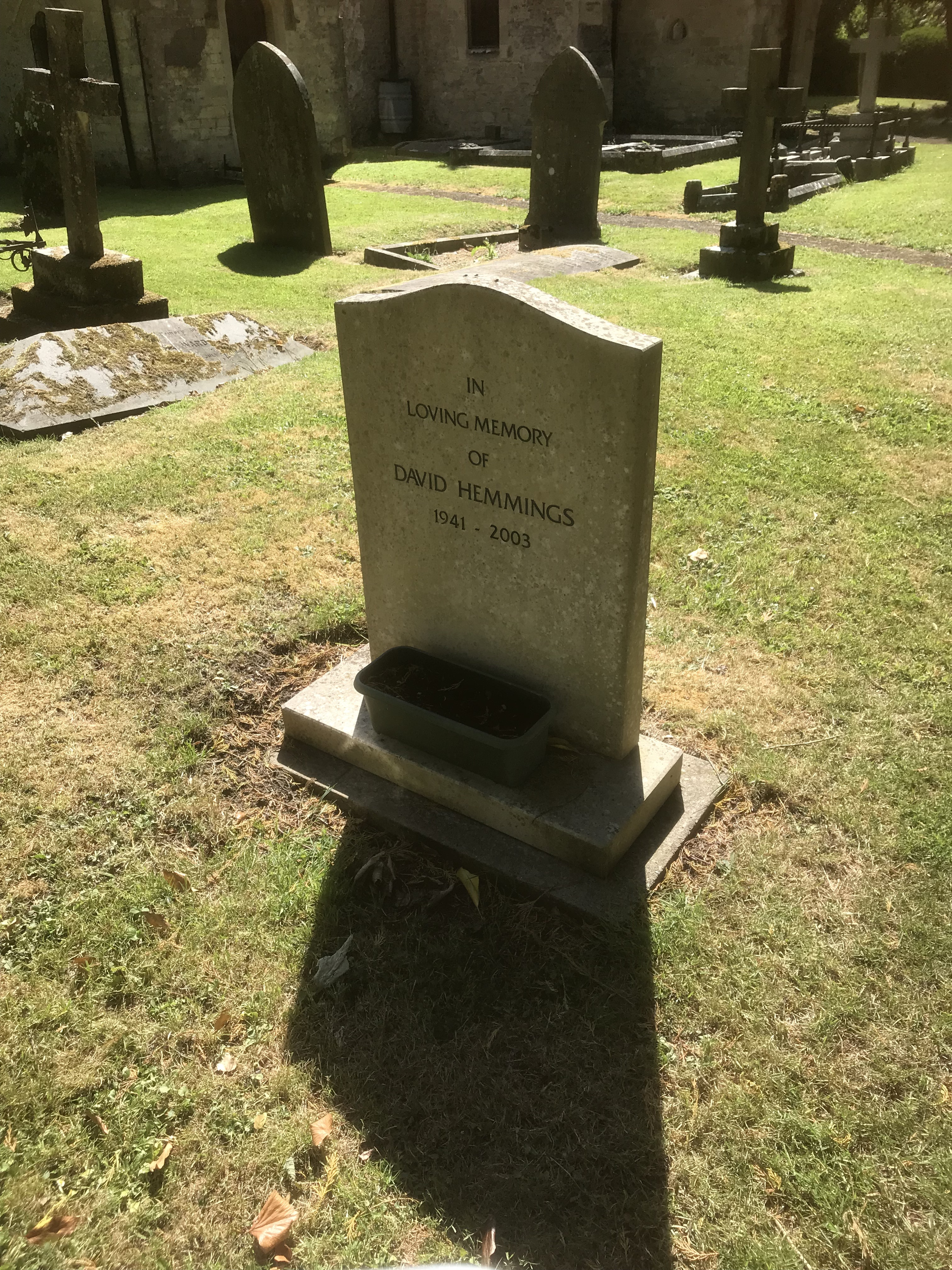
Hemmings' grave in St Peter's Church, Blackland, Wiltshire

== Death ==
Hemmings died suddenly in 2003 at age 62 of a heart attack, in Bucharest, Romania, on the film set of Blessed (working title: Samantha's Child) after he had performed his scenes for the day.

His funeral was held at St Peter's Church, in the hamlet of Blackland near Calne, Wiltshire, where he had lived in his final years. He was buried in the graveyard of the church.

== Filmography ==
- The Rainbow Jacket (1954)
- Saint Joan (1957) as Minor Role
- Five Clues to Fortune (1957) as Ken
- The Heart Within (1957) as Danny Willard
- No Trees in the Street (1959) as Kenny
- Men of Tomorrow (1959) as Ted
- In the Wake of a Stranger (1959) as Schoolboy
- Sink the Bismarck! (1960) as Seaman on Ark Royal
- The Wind of Change (1961) as Ginger
- Play It Cool (1962)
- The Painted Smile (1962) as Roy
- Some People (1962) as Bert
- West 11 (1963) as Bit Role
- Two Left Feet (1963) as Brian
- Live It Up! (1963) as Dave Martin
- The System (1964) as David
- Be My Guest (1965) as Dave Martin
- Out of the Unknown – The Counterfeit Man (1965) as Westcott
- Blowup (1966) as Thomas
- Eye of the Devil (1966) as Christian de Caray
- Camelot (1967) as Mordred
- The Charge of the Light Brigade (1968) as Captain Nolan
- Only When I Larf (1968) as Bob
- The Long Day's Dying (1968) as John
- Barbarella (1968) as Dildano
- The Best House in London (1969) as Benjamin Oakes / Walter Leybourne
- Alfred The Great (1969) as Alfred
- The Walking Stick (1970) as Leigh Hartley
- Fragment of Fear (1970) as Tim Brett
- Simon, Simon (1970) as Man in car with posters
- Unman, Wittering and Zigo (1971) as John Ebony
- The Love Machine (1971) as Jerry Nelson
- Voices (1973) as Robert
- Lola (1974) as Juan
- Juggernaut (1974) as Charlie Braddock
- Deep Red (1975) as Marcus Daly
- Mister Quilp (aka The Old Curiosity Shop; 1975) as Richard Swiveller
- Islands in the Stream (1977) as Eddy
- The Squeeze (1977) as Keith
- The Prince and the Pauper (US title Crossed Swords) (1977) as Hugh Hendon
- The Heroin Busters (1977) as Hamilton
- The Disappearance (1977) as Edward
- Swindle (1977) as Robert Clayton
- Blood Relatives (1978) as Armstrong
- Power Play (1978) as Colonel Narriman
- Just a Gigolo (1978) as Captain Hermann Kraft
- Murder by Decree (1979) as Inspector Foxborough
- Thirst (1979) as Dr. Fraser
- Charlie Muffin (US title: A Deadly Game) (1979) as Charlie Muffin
- Harlequin (1980) as Nick Rast
- Dr. Jekyll & Mr. Hyde (1980) as Dr. Henry Jekyll / Mr. Edward Hyde
- Swan Lake (1981) as Rothbart (voice)
- Beyond Reasonable Doubt (1981) as Insp. Bruce Hutton
- Prisoners (1981) as Wilkens
- Man, Woman and Child (1983) as Gavin Wilson
- Airwolf (1984) (television film and two subsequent episodes) as Dr. Charles Henry Moffet
- Magnum, P.I. (1985/87) (two episodes) as Lord Smythe-White / Danny
- The A-Team (1983/1987) (one episode) as captain of the boat (episode 2 season 4)
- Murder, She Wrote (1987) (one episode) as a police inspector
- The Rainbow (1989) as Uncle Henry
- Tales from the Crypt, "Loved to Death" (1991) as Mr. Stronham
- Father Dowling Mysteries, "The Mummy's Curse Mystery" (1991) as Kenneth Brubaker
- Northern Exposure (1992) as Viktor Bobrov
- Kung Fu: The Legend Continues (1995) as Durham
- Gladiator (2000) as Cassius
- Last Orders (2001) as Lenny
- Spy Game (2001) as CIA Agent Harry Duncan
- Mean Machine (2001) as Governor
- Waking the Dead: "Deathwatch" (2002) (television episode in 2 parts) as Ex-DCI Malcolm Finlay
- Slap Shot 2: Breaking the Ice (2002) as Martin Fox
- Equilibrium (2002) as Proctor
- Gangs of New York (2002) as Mr. Schermerhorn
- The League of Extraordinary Gentlemen (2003) as Nigel
- The Night We Called It a Day (2003) (a.k.a. All the Way) as Mickey Rudin
- Blessed (2004) as Earl Sydney
- Romantik (2007) as Dr. Sadun

=== Director ===
- Running Scared (1972)
- The 14 (1973)
- Just a Gigolo (1978)
- Race for the Yankee Zephyr (1981)
- The Survivor (1981)
- A-Team (9 episodes) (1983/1987)
- The Key to Rebecca (1985)
- Down Delaware Road (1988)
- In the Heat of the Night (1988)
- Dark Horse (1992)
- Passport to Murder (1993)
- Christmas Reunion (1994)
- Lone Justice: Showdown at Plum Creek (1996)

== Bibliography ==
- Hemmings, David (2004). Blow Up... and Other Exaggerations – The Autobiography of David Hemmings. Robson Books (London). ISBN 978-1-86105-789-1.

== See also ==
- List of British actors
- List of British film directors
- List of film producers
- List of singer-songwriters
