= Sean Caffrey =

Actor from Northern Ireland (1940–2013)

- Publicity still for I Was Happy Here (1966)
- Born: James Caffrey; 15 April 1940; Belfast, Northern Ireland
- Died: 25 April 2013 (aged 73); Belfast, Northern Ireland
- Education: Queen's University, Belfast
- Occupations: Actor; Playwright; Stage designer
- Partner: Phil Thompson

Sean Caffrey (15 April 1940 – 25 April 2013) was an actor from Northern Ireland.The Stage described him as "part of a generation of actors that came out of Northern Ireland in the 1960s to find prominence on British television," and the Belfast Telegraph called him "a largely unsung professional, who was always in demand."

He is perhaps best remembered for his performances on television in such series as No Hiding Place, Coronation Street, Z-Cars, Sutherland's Law, Oil Strike North, Survivors, Doctor Who (in the serial Horror of Fang Rock), The Professionals, Minder, Bergerac, Children of the North and Edge of Darkness. His film career included leading roles in I Was Happy Here (1966) and Lindsay Shonteff's Run with the Wind (1966). There were also roles of varying size in the Hammer films The Viking Queen (1967) and When Dinosaurs Ruled the Earth (1970), The Human Factor (1979), Harry's Game (1982), Ascendancy (1983), Curse of the Pink Panther (1983), Resurrection Man (1998), Crossmaheart (1998) and Divorcing Jack (1998).

Caffrey's stage work included appearances at Belfast's Lyric, in Stewart Parker's Spokesong (1989), Graham Reid's Lengthening Shadows (1995), Bill Morrison's Drive On! (1996) and Gary Mitchell's Marching On (2000). At the Bristol Old Vic he was in Orton's Loot and Shakespeare's Macbeth (both 1987). At the Greenwich Theatre, he appeared in Brendan Behan's The Hostage (1970). At Project Arts Centre, Dublin, and the Royal Court, he was in Peter Sheridan's The Liberty Suit (1980).

As well as acting, Caffrey also worked as a set designer and writer, having authored the play Nora Surrender (1989), amongst others. He also co-founded the North Face Theatre Company with his life partner, Phil Thompson.

== Partial filmography ==
- I Was Happy Here (1966) - Colin Foley
- Run with the Wind (1966) - Frank Hiller
- The Viking Queen (1967) - Fergus
- When Dinosaurs Ruled the Earth (1970) - Kane
- The Moon Over the Alley (1976) - Jack MacMahon
- The Human Factor (1979) - Policeman
- Ascendancy (1983) - Baird
- Curse of the Pink Panther (1983) - Doorman
- Resurrection Man (1998) - John McGuinness
- Crossmaheart (1998) - Carson
- Divorcing Jack (1998) - Joe
