= On Camera (Canadian TV series) =

Canadian drama anthology television series

- Genre: Anthology
- Country of origin: Canada
- Original language: English
- No. of seasons: 4

Production
- Running time: 30 minutes

Original release
- Network: CBC Television
- Release: 16 October 1954 – 22 September 1958

On Camera is a Canadian drama anthology television series that aired on CBC Television from 1954 to 1958.

== Premise ==
Various dramatic and comedic works were featured in On Camera, as written or adapted by Canadian writers.

== Scheduling ==
This half-hour series was broadcast for four seasons as follows:

Day	Time	Season run
Saturdays	9:00 p.m.	16 October 1954 to 2 July 1955
Saturdays	9:00 p.m.	1 October 1955 to 23 June 1956
Mondays	8:30 p.m.	29 October 1956 to 22 September 1958

== Episodes ==
Featured plays and presentations during On Camera's series run included:

- "Absentee Murder" (Charles Templeton)
- "The Almighty Voice" (a censored version of George Salverson's radio play Blasphemy)
- "Blind Date" (Jacqueline Rosenfeld)
- "Mr. Gidding Attacks" (Henry Feisen)
- "Gold Mine in the House" (J. N. Harris story; Sidney Furie adaptation)
- "The Guests" (Jack Benthover)
- "The Last Long Crusade" (Doris French)
- "Markheim" (Robert Louis Stevenson story)
- "The President's Ghost" (Michael Sheldon)
- "Stagecoach Bride" (Elsie Park Gowan)
- "Thank You, Edmondo" (Mac Shoub)
- "Two From King Street" (Jack Kuper)
- "Waltz" (Stanley Mann)
- "Who Destroyed The Earth" (Len Peterson)

Hugh Garner and Joseph Schull also wrote for the series. Episode producers included Paul Almond, Arthur Hiller, Charles Jarrott and Ted Kotcheff.
