= Lola (1974 film) =

- Directed by: José María Forqué
- Screenplay by: José María Forqué; Hermógenes Sáinz
- Produced by: José María Forqué
- Starring: David Hemmings; Francisco Rabal; Alida Valli
- Cinematography: Alejandro Ulloa
- Edited by: Mercedes Alonso
- Music by: Adolfo Waitzman
- Production company: Producciones Cinematográficas Orfeo
- Distributed by: Kora-Film
- Release date: May 29, 1974
- Running time: 89 minutes
- Countries: Spain; Venezuela
- Languages: English; Spanish

Lola is a 1974 Spanish drama film directed by José María Forqué and starring David Hemmings, Alida Valli and Francisco Rabal. A dissolute young hacienda-owner makes many enemies through his behaviour. Its Spanish title is No es nada, mamá, sólo un juego, and has been marketed on home media under its English translation It's Nothing Mama Just A Game

== Cast ==
- David Hemmings - Juan
- Alida Valli - Louise
- Francisco Rabal - Tío
- Andrea Rau - Lola
- Nuria Gimeno - Lucia
- Galeazzo Benti - Doctor
- Aquiles Guerrero - Aquiles
- Lucila Herrera - Maria
- Gonzalo Fernández de Córdoba hijo - Juan as child
- Rudy Hernández - Isabel
- Enrique Soto - Lolas Father
