= Soft Sand, Blue Sea =

1998 British film

- Theatrical film poster
- Directed by: Pip Broughton
- Written by: Stephen Butchard
- Produced by: Alan Bleasdale; Keith Thompson
- Starring: Laurence Kinlan; Aimee Mulligan; Julia Ford; Brendan Coyle
- Cinematography: Geoff Healey
- Edited by: William Diver
- Release date: May 25, 1998 (UK)
- Running time: 98 mins.
- Country: United Kingdom
- Language: English

Soft Sand, Blue Sea is a 1998 British drama film, directed by Pip Broughton and written by Stephen Butchard. The film stars Laurence Kinlan, Aimee Mulligan, Julia Ford and Brendan Coyle. It premiered in 1998 in the UK.

== Synopsis ==
A poignant drama set in a children's home where conflict is rife and tragedy suddenly strikes. For 13yrs old David and 9yrs old Danni, escape becomes a necessity not just a dream.

== Cast ==
- Laurence Kinlan as David
- Aimee Mulligan as Danielle
- Julia Ford as Sarah
- Brendan Coyle as Gerry
- Rosemary Henderson as Christine
- Owen Roe as Joe

== Reception ==
Hamish Adam of Amazon called Laurence Kinlan "a star" and said he gave "a remarkable performance". Dave S. of 60 Minutes With... praised the film as "intense, yet intoxicating" for being able to "tug at the heartstrings more than any other Alan Bleasdale production". And Patrick J. Hurst of Letterboxd gave the film 3/5 stars.
