= Debbie Evans =

American motorcycle racer

- Born: February 5, 1958 (age 68); Lakewood, California, US
- Other names: Debbie J. Evans, Debbi Evans, Debra Evans, Debbie Evans-Leavitt, Debbie Evans Leavitt
- Occupations: Motorcycle observed trials competitor and stunt actor
- Spouse: Lane Leavitt (m. 1979)
- Children: 3
- Website: debbieevans.com

Debbie Evans (born February 5, 1958) is an American former motorcycle observed trials competitor and current stunt actor. In the 1970s, Evans was considered the best female observed trials rider in the United States, earning factory-backed sponsorship from Yamaha. She later parlayed her motorcycling experience to become a successful film industry stunt performer. Evans was inducted to the AMA Motorcycle Hall of Fame in 2003.

== Motorcycling career ==
Evans was born and raised in Lakewood, California, and learned to ride a motorcycle at the age of six. Her father, David Evans, competed in motorcycle observed trials and she grew up attending motorcycle competitions and learned her trials skills from her father. She began competing in trials and enduro events, usually as the only female in the competition.

In 1978 at the age of 19, Evans accepted an invitation to compete in the grueling Scottish Six Days Trial, at the suggestion of Bill Emmison of UK importation firm BERM Specialties and with support from Gordon Farley Motorcycles England who provided her with a motorcycle for the event. Although some enthusiasts thought that the trial may be too difficult for Evans, she proved her skill by not only finishing the event, but finishing in a respectable fourth place against male competitors in the Under 200cc division.

Evans also began performing exhibition shows, eventually displaying her riding skills in front of tens of thousands of fans at AMA Grand National Championship and AMA Supercross events. She became known for a trick in which she would balance her motorcycle with the kickstand up and perform a headstand on the seat. She appeared in the 1980 motorcycle documentary film, Take It To The Limit, performing her trademark headstand on a motorcycle.

== Film industry career ==
Evans' exceptional riding ability eventually led her to work in the American film industry as a stunt rider. She became so successful as a stunt performer that it became her full-time job. Evans has appeared in over 200 movies and television shows, including motorcycle stunt work in The Matrix Reloaded as well as in The Fast and the Furious film franchise.

== Later life ==
At the age of 40, Evans returned to the sport of observed trials in 1998 to compete in the Women's Trials World Championship. Despite having spent 18 years away from the sport, she finished the season in a respectable eighth place. Evans was inducted to the AMA Motorcycle Hall of Fame in 2003.

== National Trials Championship Career ==
Year	Class	Machine	Rd 1	Rd 2	Rd 3	Rd 4	Rd 5	Rd 6	Rd 7	Rd 8	Rd 9	Rd 10	Rd 11	Rd 12	Rd 13	Points	Pos	Notes
2003	(United States) NATC Women's	Sherco	CA -	CA -	WA -	WA -	OR -	OR -	PA -	PA -	RI -	RI -	WY -	WY -	CA; 5	16	14th	

== International Trials Championship Career ==
Year	Class	Machine	Rd 1	Points	Pos	Notes
1999	FIM European Women's	Gas Gas	ITA; 9	7	9th	
2000	FIM World Women's	Gas Gas	SPA; 15	1	15th	
