= Duffer (film) =

1972 British film

- Theatrical film poster
- Directed by: Joseph Despins; William Dumaresq
- Written by: William Dumaresq
- Produced by: Joseph Despins; William Dumaresq
- Starring: Kit Gleave; Erna May; William Dumaresq
- Cinematography: Jorge Guerra
- Edited by: Joseph Despins
- Music by: Galt MacDermot
- Release date: January 9, 1972 (UK)
- Running time: 75 mins.
- Country: United Kingdom
- Language: English

Duffer is a 1972 British experimental film, directed by Joseph Despins and William Dumaresq, the latter of whom wrote and also co-starred alongside Kit Gleave and Erna May. It premiered in 1972 in the UK. The writing/directing team later collaborated on another cult film, The Moon Over the Alley (1976).

== Synopsis ==
Duffer tells the story of a teenage boy torn between the charms of a kindly prostitute and the relentless, sadistic attentions of an older man.

== Cast ==
- Kit Gleave as Duffer
- Erna May as Your Gracie
- William Dumaresq as Louis-Jack

== Reception ==
Mondo-Digital calls Duffer "what happens if John Waters and playwright Joe Orton got together on a drunken evening".

Graeme Clark of The Spinning Image rated it 6/10 stars, and says that the film "is in its offbeat manner quite compelling, not just because it rises above its tiny budget with the power of its imagination".

And Matty Stanfield of Letterboxd rates the film 4.5/5 stars, lauding it for being "unique, innovative, disturbing, and haunting".
