= I Was Happy Here =

1966 British film by Desmond Davis

- Directed by: Desmond Davis
- Screenplay by: Edna O'Brien; Desmond Davis
- Based on: story A Woman by the Seaside by Edna O'Brien
- Starring: Sarah Miles; Cyril Cusack; Julian Glover; Sean Caffrey; Maire Keane
- Cinematography: Manny Wynn
- Edited by: Brian Smedley-Aston
- Music by: John Addison
- Production companies: Partisan Productions; The Rank Organisation
- Distributed by: Rank Organisation
- Release date: July 1966 (UK)
- Running time: 91 minutes
- Country: United Kingdom
- Language: English
- Budget: £167,779

I Was Happy Here (U.S. title: Time Lost and Time Remembered; also known as Passage of Love) is a 1966 British drama film directed by Desmond Davis and starring Sarah Miles and Cyril Cusack. The screenplay was by Edna O'Brien and Davis.

== Plot ==
Cass Langdon follows the bright lights to London, but is quickly disillusioned. She meets and marries Doctor Matthew Langdon, but soon realises her desire to return to her home by the sea, and her first love, Colin.

== Cast ==
- Sarah Miles as Cass Langdon
- Cyril Cusack as Hogan
- Julian Glover as Dr. Matthew Langdon
- Sean Caffrey as Colin Foley
- Maire Keane as barkeeper
- Eve Belton as Kate
- Cardew Robinson as gravedigger

== Production ==
The film was the first in a series of co production between the National Film Finance Corporation and Rank. It was originally called Passage of Love.

Filming began in June 1965 with a six-week shoot in County Clare, Ireland, followed by three weeks in London and another week in Ireland.

The movie was filmed in Lahinch, County Clare, Ireland and Twickenham Studios, London.

== Reception ==
The film received some supportive reviews but was a box office disappointment and lost money.

=== Critical ===
The Monthly Film Bulletin wrote: "The prevailing tone of downright artificiality is struck at the outset with Sarah Miles posing in silhouette behind the credits and against the crashing sea. The entire film, with its resounding John Addison score, is built on sometimes striking images of this sort. ... The character of Matthew, as scripted and as played by Julian Glover, is probably the most unreal element in all this Irish romanticism, although it can equally be said that Cass as a character precludes any possibility of a coherent performance on the part of Sarah Miles. Only Cyril Cusack, more fortunate in his role of sagacious old bar owner, manages to convey the feeling of an actual human being living in a world of real emotions."

Allmovie noted "a softly beautiful, hauntingly poetic little film, a fragile piece of filmmaking that in other hands could come off as either unbearably precious or pretentious. Fortunately, Time is shepherded by Desmond Davis, who handles the material with just the right degree of sensitivity."

Time Out called it "A horribly pretentious and sentimental film which still manages to retain a degree of emotional power, with moments of real intensity and conviction... The film is certainly much better than Davis' earlier Irish story The Girl with Green Eyes (also adapted from Edna O'Brien), but it's dogged by the awful tricks of overemphasis which he seems to have learned from his patron Tony Richardson."

TV Guide thought it, "Slow in pace, with beautiful photography and fine acting, this is a well-told tale of disenchantment and resignation."

The Radio Times Guide to Films gave the film 3/5 stars, writing: "A bittersweet story of Irish disenchantment, this reminds us just how good Sarah Miles could be, even if she hasn't made many films of late. ... The character's winsomeness can be a bit cloying, but Miles is impressive as the wide-eyed innocent who makes us sympathise with her contrary nature."

== Accolades ==
The film won three awards at the 1966 San Sebastián International Film Festival.

== Notes ==
- Petrie, Duncan James (2016). "Resisting Hollywood Dominance in Sixties British Cinema : The NFFC/Rank Joint Financing Initiative" (PDF). Historical Journal of Film, Radio and Television.
