= Clapham Common =

Urban park in Clapham, London, England

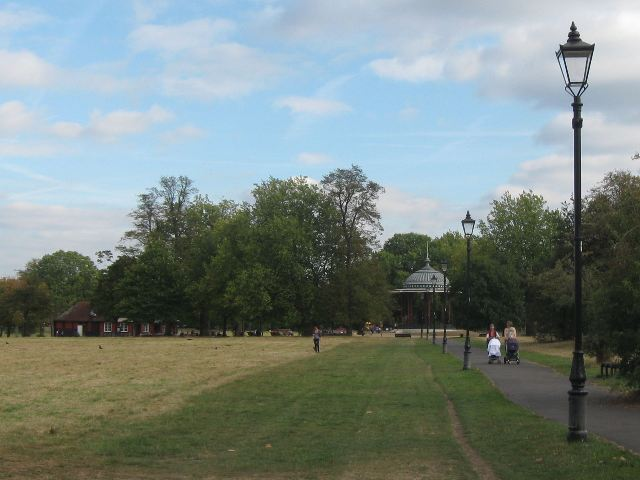
- Clapham Common
- Interactive map of Clapham Common
- Type: Public park (previously common land)
- Location: Clapham
- Coordinates: 51.4578°N 0.1494°W
- Area: 220 acres (0.89 km^{2})
- Operator: Lambeth London Borough Council
- Open: All year
- Public transit: Clapham Common and Clapham South

Clapham Common is a large triangular urban park in Clapham, south London, England. Originally common land for the parishes of Battersea and Clapham, it was converted to parkland under the terms of the Metropolitan Commons Act 1878. It is 220 acres (89 hectares) of green space, with three ponds and a Victorian bandstand. It is overlooked by large Georgian and Victorian mansions and nearby Clapham Old Town.

Holy Trinity Clapham, an 18th-century Georgian church overlooking the common, is important in the history of the evangelical Clapham Sect. Half of the common is within the London Borough of Wandsworth, and the other half is within the London Borough of Lambeth.

== History ==
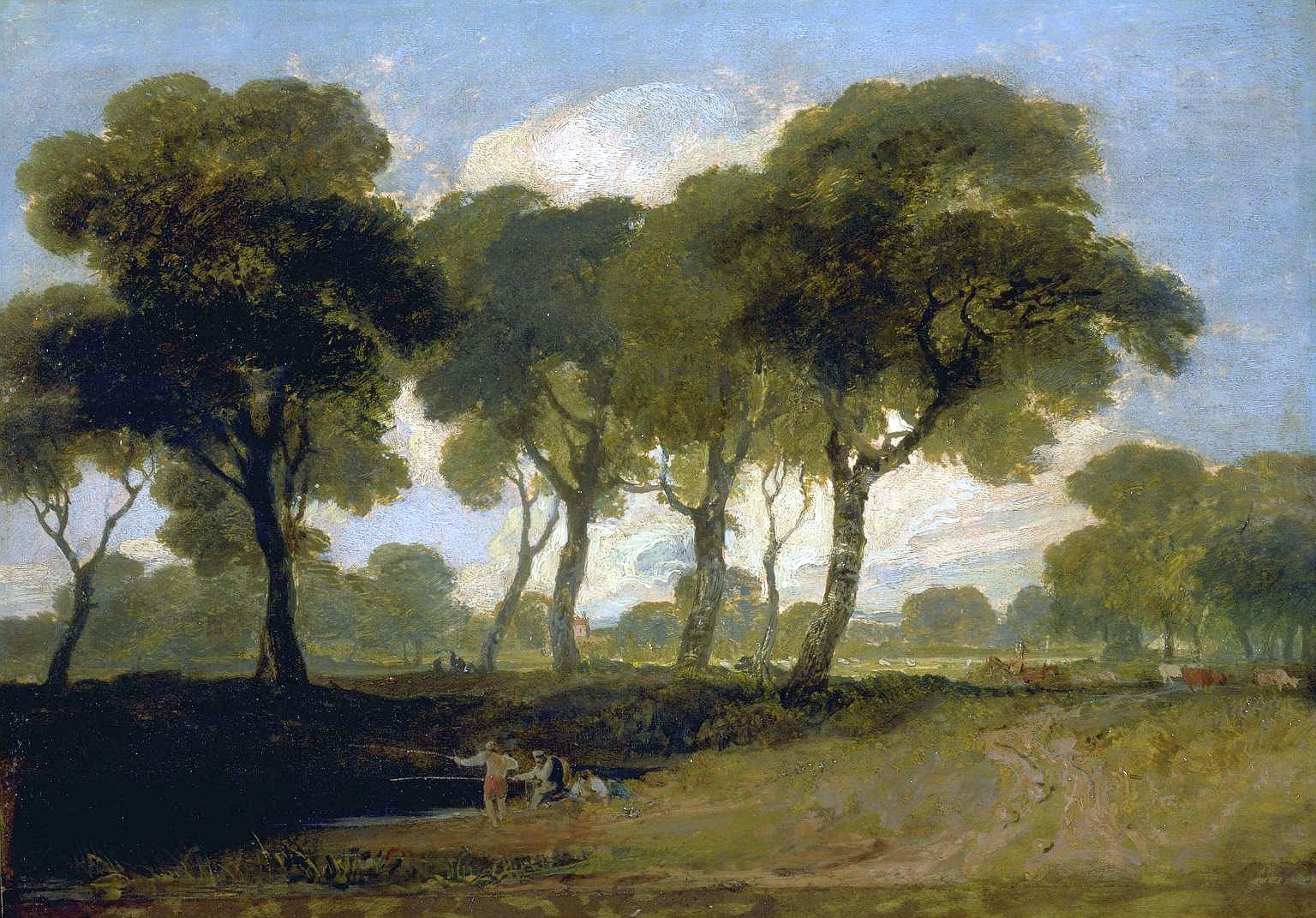
View on Clapham Common by J. M. W. Turner (1800–1805)

It was originally common land for the parishes of Battersea and Clapham. William Hewer was among the early Londoners to build adjacent to it. Samuel Pepys, the diarist, died at Hewer's house in 1703. The land was used for cricket in 1700 and was drained in the 1760s, and from the 1790s onwards fine houses were built around the common as fashionable dwellings for wealthy business people in what was then a village detached from metropolitan London. Some later residents were members of the Clapham Sect of evangelical reformers and slavery abolitionists, including William Wilberforce, Lord Teignmouth and Henry Thornton.

In the early 1770s, during his stay in London representing America in affairs of the state, Benjamin Franklin wrote a paper explaining how he used the ponds for science experiments, and in developing a "magic" trick. While travelling on a ship, Franklin had observed that the wake of a ship was diminished when the cooks scuttled their greasy water. He studied the effects at Clapham Common on a large pond there. "I fetched out a cruet of oil and dropt a little of it on the water ... though not more than a teaspoon full, produced an instant calm over a space of several yards square." He later used the trick to "calm the waters" by carrying "a little oil in the hollow joint of my cane."

J. M. W. Turner painted "View on Clapham Common" between 1800 and 1805, showing that even though the common had been drained, it still remained "quite a wild place".

The common was converted to parkland under the terms of the Metropolitan Commons Act in 1878. As London expanded in the 19th century, Clapham was absorbed into the capital, with most of the remaining palatial or agricultural estates replaced with terraced housing by the early 1900s.

In 1911, Scottish evangelist and teacher Oswald Chambers founded and was principal of the Bible Training College, an "embarrassingly elegant" property situated at 45 North Side that had been purchased by the Pentecostal League of Prayer.

During World War II, a heavy anti-aircraft artillery site was set up on the common. Storage bunkers were built on the Battersea Rise side; two mounds remain.

== Governance ==
Half of the common is within the London Borough of Wandsworth and half within the London Borough of Lambeth. It is wholly managed and maintained by Lambeth Council. Policing of the open space is divided between the Wandsworth and Lambeth borough "commands" of the Metropolitan Police, which follow the local government boundaries. The roads surrounding the common fall within the SW4, SW11 and SW12 postcodes.

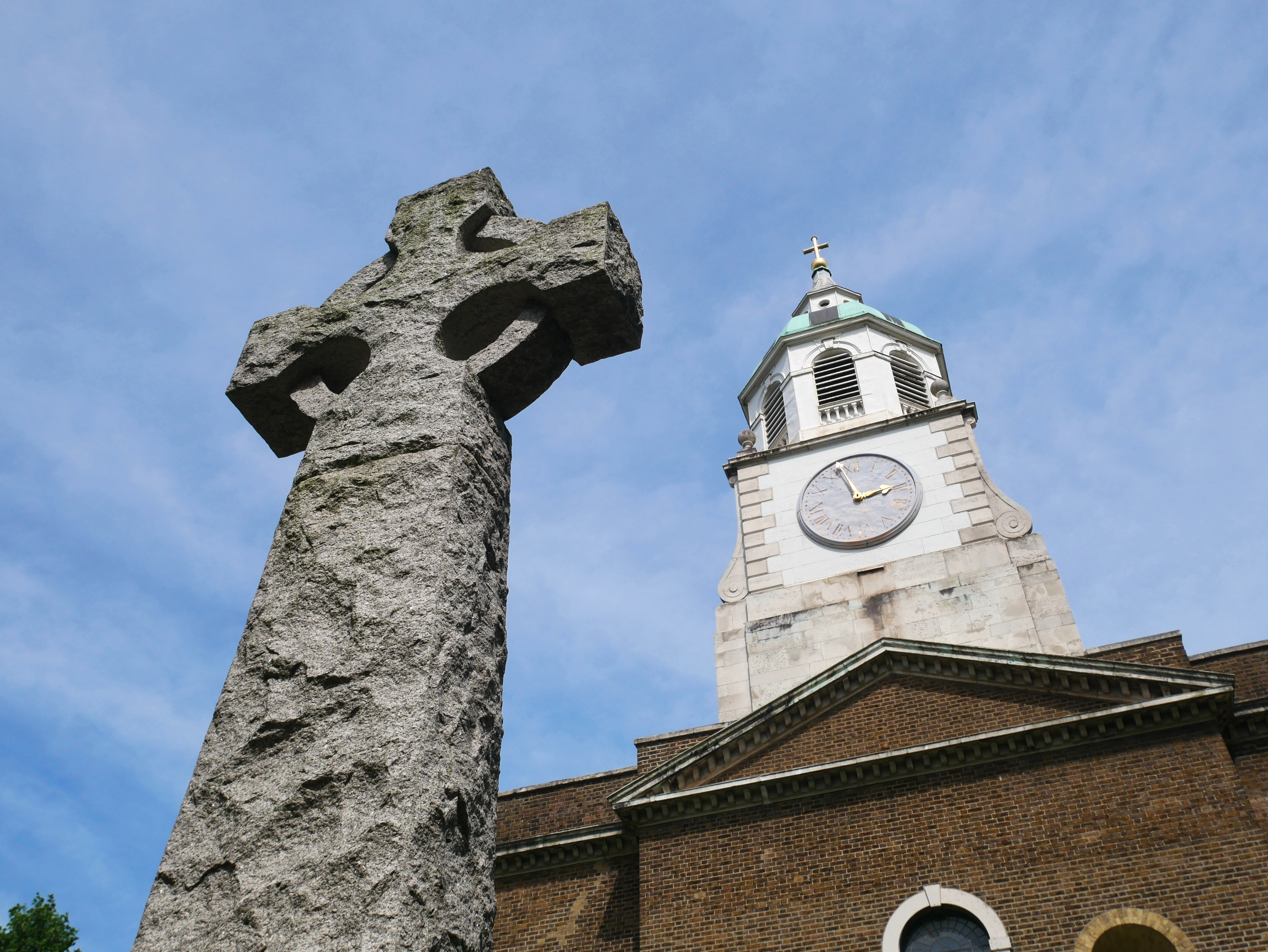
Clapham Common war memorial, located outside the Holy Trinity Church

== Local government ==
Electoral wards for Lambeth are within the eastern half of the common, mainly in the Clapham Common and Abbeville ward, with smaller parts divided between the Clapham Town ward and Clapham East ward. In Wandsworth, most of the western half of the common is in the Northcote ward and a small part of the south-western corner is in the Balham ward.

== Amenities ==
Clapham Common has a range of sporting facilities, including tennis and netball courts, a running track, bowling green, cricket, football, rugby and Australian rules football pitches, and a skateboard venue. In 2021, Foot Locker, in partnership with the NBA, completed the refurbishment of the Clapham Common Basketball Court.

The park contains three ponds, two of which are historical features, and a more modern paddling pool known as Cock Pond. Eagle Pond and Mount Pond are used for angling and contain a variety of species including carp to 20 lb, roach, tench and bream. Eagle Pond was extensively refurbished in 2005 when it was completely drained, landscaped and replanted to provide a better habitat for the fish it contained. Long Pond has a century-old tradition of use for model boating.

Holy Trinity Church (1776) is close to the north side of the common. An Anglican church, it hosts its fete every summer.

Clapham Common and Clapham South Underground stations are on the edge of the common at its easternmost and southernmost points respectively. Both stations are served by the Northern line.

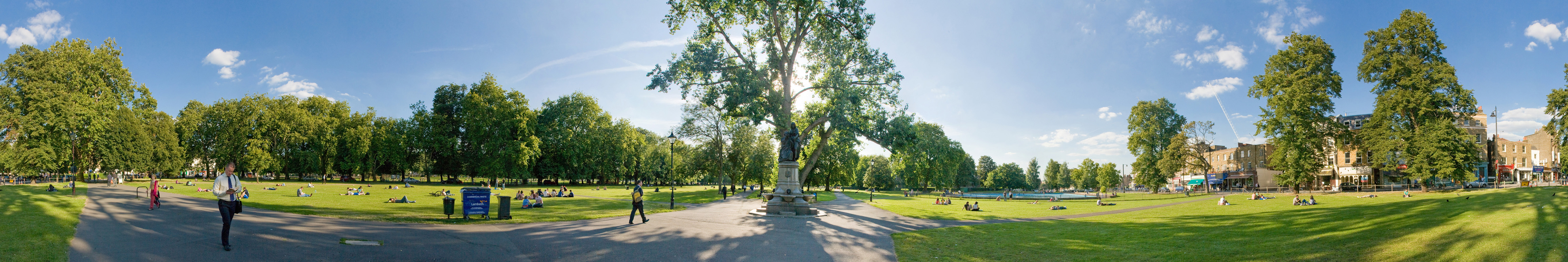
A 270-degree panoramic view of Clapham Common

== The bandstand ==
In the centre of the common is a bandstand constructed in 1890. It is the largest bandstand in London and a Grade II listed building. For many years it was also erroneously thought to be one of the bandstands first erected in 1861 in the Royal Horticultural Society's gardens in South Kensington, which would have made it the oldest surviving cast iron bandstand in Europe. However, further research has shown that these bandstands went to Southwark Park and Peckham Rye, and it appears that the Clapham bandstand was fabricated to a very similar design almost thirty years later.

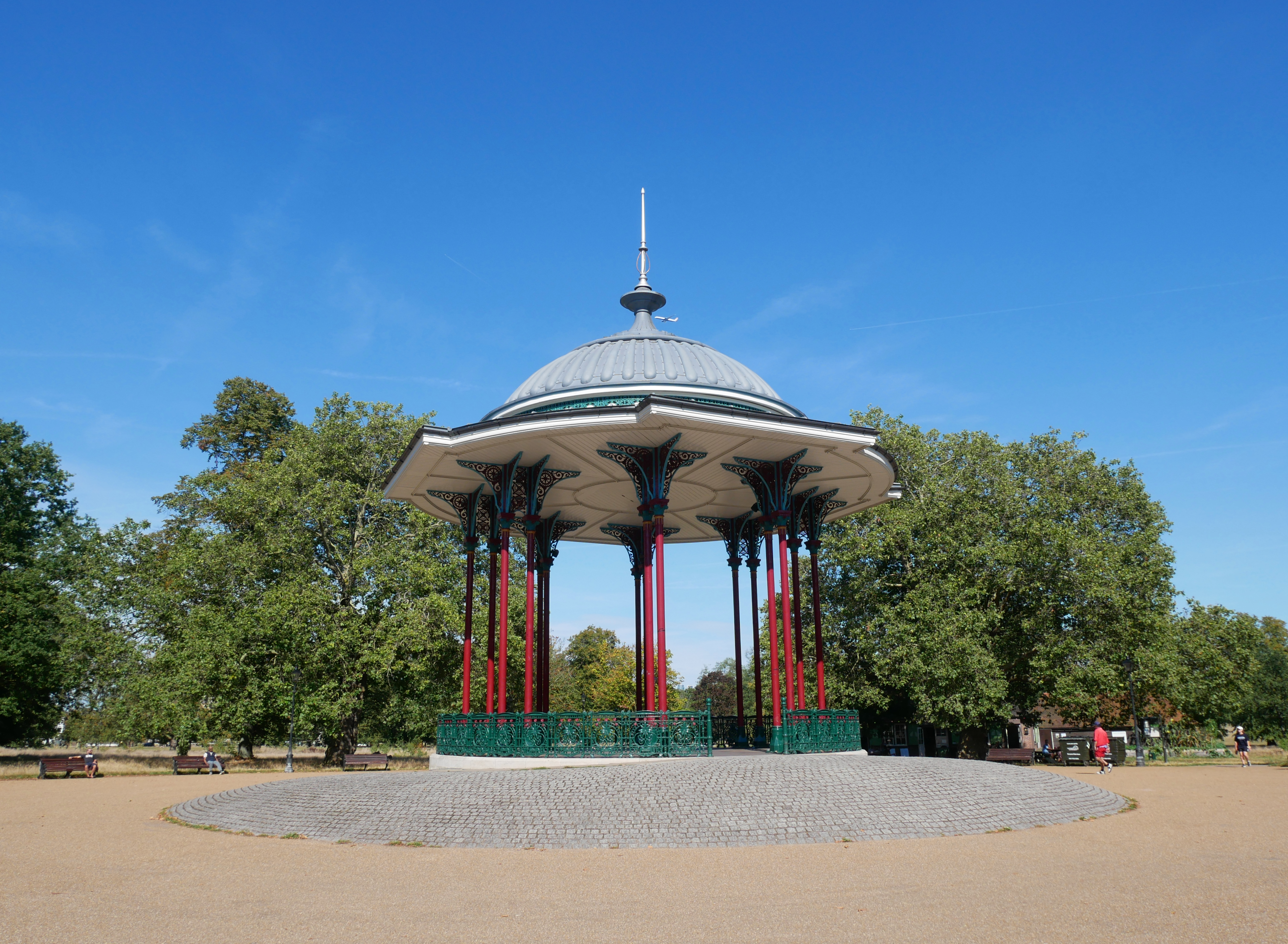
Clapham Common bandstand, a Grade II listed building, in 2023

The bandstand's maintenance had been neglected by Lambeth Council for thirty years, and by 2001 it was thought to be in danger of collapse and had to be shored up with scaffolding for five years. In 2005–2006, a full restoration of the bandstand and surrounding landscape took place, partly funded by an £895,000 lottery grant from the Heritage Lottery Fund matched by £300,000 from Lambeth Council and a further £100,000 from local fundraising efforts and the proceeds of the Ben and Jerry's Summer Sundae event held on the common. The drainage bund around the bandstand was restored with granite setts during the summer of 2011 at a cost of £12,000 to resolve design faults in the earlier works.

== Events ==
The common has hosted various musical festivals, including Colourscape Music Festival since 1989; Get Loaded in the Park, from 2004 to 2011 when Razorlight were the headline act; South West Four Eurodance music festival annually in August since 2004; and other music events, such as Subway Picnic Rocks in 2008, organised by Action Against Hunger. In 2014 the Calling Festival, which had previously been held in Hyde Park under the name Hard Rock Calling Festival, moved to Clapham Common; artists included Aerosmith and Stevie Wonder.

Sporting events held on Clapham Common and sports teams based there include the Latin American football League, which has played organised football on the red car pitches located on the south side of the park since the 1980s; the British Australian Rules Football League Grand Final, for which the common is the traditional venue; and South West London Chargers rugby club, formed in 2013; Sunday league football is regularly played, with London Titans and Clapham Alexandra among the football clubs using the common. Various teams from other sports are also active, including softball and korfball.

A Lesbian & Gay Pride event, to be termed Pride House, was planned to take place on the common during the 2012 Summer Olympics, but ran into opposition from the Friends of Clapham Common and was eventually cancelled for lack of funding. Every Easter and February half-term George Irvin's Funfair visits the common.

On 13 March 2021, a vigil was held on the common following the murder of Sarah Everard, who was kidnapped nearby by then-serving Metropolitan Police officer Wayne Couzens.

== Cruising ==
Clapham Common has a reputation as a place for men seeking anonymous sex with other men in public places. When Welsh politician Ron Davies was robbed at knifepoint in 1998 after he gave a lift to strangers he had met on the common, there was speculation that the incident involved "cruising"; Davies resigned his position in the UK government, denying the incident had anything to do with drugs or sex. There have been several attacks on men in the vicinity of the common, including one in 2005 on a young man, Jody Dobrowski, thought by his attackers to be gay. He was badly beaten and later died. The incident was the impetus for the making of the 2007 Channel 4 film Clapham Junction.

== In popular culture ==
- Writer and journalist Graham Greene, who lived at Clapham Common North Side, set his 1951 novel The End of the Affair in and around the area. The location is also referenced in the 1999 film adaptation of the book.
- The common is mentioned in the 1963 novel Up the Junction by Nell Dunn.
- The "... windy common" appears in the lyrics of the 1979 song also titled "Up the Junction" by Squeeze. The title was inspired by the 1965 BBC TV adaptation of Nell Dunn's book and directed by Ken Loach.
- The area is a backdrop in the 1985 film The Good Father starring Anthony Hopkins.
- Clapham Common is featured in a 1989 episode of Agatha Christie's Poirot TV series titled The Adventure of the Clapham Cook, adapted from an Agatha Christie short story.
