= Up the Junction (disambiguation) =

Up the Junction is a 1963 short story collection by Nell Dunn.

Up the Junction may also refer to:

- Up the Junction (The Wednesday Play), a 1965 television adaptation
- Up the Junction (film), a 1968 film adaptation
  - Up the Junction (soundtrack), the soundtrack album for the film, by Manfred Mann, and the name of the title track
- "Up the Junction" (song), a 1979 single by Squeeze
