= Poor Cow (novel) =

1967 novel by Nell Dunn

- First edition
- Author: Nell Dunn
- Language: English
- Publisher: MacGibbon & Kee
- Publication date: 1967
- Publication place: UK
- Media type: Print (hardback & paperback)
- Pages: 141 pp
- ISBN: 0860689905 (1988 Virago Press paperback edition)
- Preceded by: Up the Junction
- Followed by: Tear His Head Off His Shoulders

Poor Cow is the first full-length novel by Nell Dunn, first published in 1967 by MacGibbon & Kee. The story portrays a young working-class woman from the East End of London as she navigates life during the Swinging Sixties, grappling with the consequences of a series of poor decisions. The novel was adapted into a film later that same year.

== Plot ==
Working-class Joy, 22 and dreaming of the good life the Swinging Sixties has promised, discovers the pitfalls of traditional gender roles when her husband Tom is sent to prison for theft, leaving her to look after baby Jonny. She moves in with her Auntie Emm and manages to keep her head above water by working as a barmaid and occasional sex worker. When Joy begins an affair with a friend of her husband, another petty thief, she cannot help but start to dream all over again. It is only when her child goes missing that she finally realises the emptiness of her daydreams.

== Adaptations ==
Nell Dunn wrote the screenplay for a film version in 1967, directed by Ken Loach and starring Carol White and Terence Stamp.

== Critical reception ==
On 5 November 2019 BBC News included Poor Cow on its list of the 100 most influential novels.
