= Gigwise =

Defunct British music website

- Website type: Music webzine
- Available in: English
- Owner: Giant Digital
- Creators: Simon Perlaki and Andy D Day
- Commercial: Yes
- Registration: Optional
- Launched: 2001
- Current status: Closed in 2024; domain subsequently taken over by AI-driven outfit, who use it as a celebrity-oriented site.

Gigwise (stylised as GigWise) was a British music webzine and later, a print magazine. The site was founded in Liverpool in 2001, and subsequently moved its headquarters to London. Over time, its scope grew from providing gig listings to publishing music news, album reviews, artist interviews, and live music coverage. From 2021–2023, a Gigwise print magazine was also published. During its existence, Gigwise's content was reprinted by mainstream news and entertainment outlets including BBC News, the Guardian and Rolling Stone.

Gigwise closed in 2024. The domain was subsequently taken over by an AI-driven outfit, who publish a celebrity-oriented site using the Gigwise name.

== History ==
Gigwise was launched in 2001 in Liverpool, before moving its offices to East London. Originally a gig listings page, the site evolved into a music news site including album reviews, artist interviews and live music coverage in its content. As of October 2010, Gigwise was one of the UK's 20 most-visited music news websites, attracting more readers than NME.com and BBC Music.

In 2011, Gigwise had its own arena at the Get Loaded in the Park festival in London, and hosted the "best song" award at the BT Digital Music Awards. The following year, Gigwise became one of two online media partners for the Strummer of Love festival held in Somerset in aid of the late Joe Strummer, with the proceeds going to the Strummerville charity. Gigwise was nominated in the "Best Music Media Brand" category at the 2013 Music Week awards.

The first ever print edition of Gigwise was published in July 2021, in celebration of the site's 20th anniversary. The magazine continued to be published through 2023, with issue 8 being released that June. Activity on Gigwise's X and Facebook pages ceased that year; by May 2024, the site had been taken offline.

During its existence, Gigwise's content was reprinted by mainstream news and entertainment outlets including BBC News, the Guardian, Rolling Stone, Billboard and the NME. Former site editors include Holly Frith, Michael Baggs, Andy Morris, Andrew Trendell and Cai Trefor. Singer Self Esteem described Gigwise as a "stellar music magazine".
