= Susan Campbell (illustrator and author) =

English illustrator and writer (1931–2024)

- Born: 14 September 1931; Ruislip, Middlesex, England
- Died: 2 January 2024 (aged 92)
- Occupations: Author, illustrator

Susan Campbell (14 September 1931 – 2 January 2024) was an English illustrator, food writer, garden historian and leading authority on the history of walled kitchen gardens.

== Biography ==
Susan Benson was born in Ruislip, Middlesex, 14 September 1931. She trained at the Slade School of Art (1950–1953). She worked under her maiden name as an illustrator. After marriage to Robin Campbell, she went on to be a food writer, later becoming a garden historian and leading authority on the history of walled kitchen gardens.

Studying at the Slade, Campbell (then Benson) was a contemporary of Michael Andrews, Euan Uglow, Craigie Aitchison and others.

In her final year, she was commissioned by the magazine The Sketch to make fortnightly drawings of various towns and social events in the UK. She was awarded an Abbey Minor Travelling Scholarship and also won two prizes in a competition run by The Football Association entitled Football and the Fine Arts, one for the drawing section and the other for the etching section. With the proceeds of these awards she spent a year living in Sicily, drawing and painting peasant life and living very frugally.

On returning to England in 1954, she gave up painting and concentrated on illustration and drawing, working initially for The Sunday Times, The Observer, Shell Oil and various magazines. Her first book illustration was a collaboration with Nell Dunn, Up the Junction. This was followed in 1968 by another collaboration with Dunn on a children's book, Freddy Gets Married.

In the 1970s, she collaborated with Caroline Conran, food and cookery editor of The Times on Poor Cook, which was designed by Peter Kindersley. Conran and Campbell collaborated again a few years later on Family Cook in 1974, and a combination of the two previous books, Bumper Cook in 1978.

From 1986, Campbell was a member of the Guild of Food Writers. She continued to write and illustrate books and articles on food until 1981, when her interest was diverted to the history of walled kitchen gardens. This change of tack was inspired by a visit, some twenty years earlier, to Thomas Pakenham at Tullynally Castle where the vast walled kitchen garden was intact and still in production. She had never seen a functioning walled kitchen garden before. The garden there, then, was in stark contrast to almost every walled kitchen garden in England, where so many had fallen into dereliction with the decline of the country house following the Second World War.

Following a 1984 enquiry from the BBC about a suitable garden for the BBC2 TV series The Victorian Kitchen Garden, Campbell discovered the kitchen garden at Cottesbrooke Hall, which was unique in being run exactly as it would have been before the war. This led to the publication of Cottesbrooke, an English Kitchen Garden, in August, 1987, which coincided quite unintentionally with the first airing of the TV series The Victorian Kitchen Garden. The two events highlighted the huge loss of walled kitchen gardens, ignited public interest and spurred Campbell on to research them further.

Campbell then concentrated her research on the history of the walled kitchen at Pylewell Park close to her home in the New Forest. This became the fictionalised garden Charleston Kedding in her book of the same name, first published in 1996. The name was an anagram of old kitchen gardens to protect the identity of the garden. However, interest in the subject matter was so great that it was eventually felt there was no need for anonymity and the book was subsequently re-issued in 2005 by Frances Lincoln publishers with the more descriptive title A History of Kitchen Gardening. All editions of the book were illustrated with drawings by the author.

Over almost forty years, Campbell visited and researched over 700 walled kitchen gardens in the UK and abroad. With fellow garden historian Fiona Grant, she established the Walled Kitchen Garden Network in 2001. This continues to be supported by Historic England, The National Trust, The Gardens Trust and Garden Organic (Henry Doubleday Research Association). As the leading authority in the field, Campbell was instrumental in advising on many pioneering kitchen garden restoration projects, including those at Tatton Park, Hampton Court, Fulham Palace, Audley End, Quarry Bank and Croome Court. Part of Campbell's archive of material on kitchen gardens is now housed at Hestercombe House in Somerset. Campbell is a vice president of The Gardens Trust (formerly The Garden History Society).

In later years, Campbell researched the garden of Robert Darwin, (father of Charles Darwin) at The Mount and published three articles in Garden History, the journal of The Gardens Trust.

Campbell died on 2 January 2024, at the age of 92.

== Bibliography ==
- Poor Cook (1971) Susan Campbell and Caroline Conran Macmillan ISBN 978-0333331767
- Family Cook (1974) Susan Campbell and Caroline Conran Sphere; ISBN 978-0722121979
- Cheap Eats in London, Susan Campbell, Alexandra Towle (1975) Penguin ISBN 978-0140462180
- Bumper Cook Susan Campbell and Caroline Conran (1978) Macmillan ISBN 978-0333238561
- Guide to Good Food Shops Susan Campbell (1979) Macmillan ISBN 978-0333256169
- The Cook's Companion (1980) Susan Campbell, Macmillan ISBN 0-333-28790-8
- --do.-- (1985) Littlehampton Book Services Ltd ISBN 978-0907486800
- Cottesbrooke: An English Kitchen Garden Susan Campbell, Hugh Palmer (1987) Ebury Press ISBN 978-0712612517
- Charleston Kedding: A History of Kitchen Gardening Susan Campbell (1996) Ebury Press ISBN 978-0091813857
- Euan Uglow: some memories of the painter Susan Campbell (ed. 2003), (London: Browse and Darby, and the Sheepdrove Trust) ISBN 978 0953386239
- Walled Kitchen Gardens Susan Campbell (2006) Shire Books ISBN 9780747806578
- A History of Kitchen Gardening, Susan Campbell (2015) Unicorn Press ISBN 978-1910065914
