= Poor Cow =

1967 British film by Ken Loach

- DVD cover for Poor Cow
- Directed by: Ken Loach
- Screenplay by: Nell Dunn; Ken Loach
- Based on: Poor Cow (novel) by Nell Dunn
- Produced by: Joseph Janni; Edward Joseph
- Starring: Terence Stamp; Carol White
- Cinematography: Brian Probyn
- Edited by: Roy Watts
- Music by: Donovan
- Production company: Vic Films Productions
- Distributed by: Anglo-Amalgamated
- Release date: 5 December 1967 (UK)
- Running time: 101 minutes
- Country: United Kingdom
- Language: English
- Budget: £228,206
- Box office: $1,400,000 (US/ Canada)

Poor Cow (also known as No Tears for Joy) is a 1967 British kitchen sink drama film directed by Ken Loach and starring Carol White and Terence Stamp. It was written by Loach and Nell Dunn based on Dunn's 1967 novel of the same name. It was Loach's first feature film, after a series of TV productions. It received mixed reviews from critics, but was a box-office success.

The film was re-released in the UK in 2016.

== Plot ==
18-year-old Joy, who comes from a big family with an alcoholic mother and womanising father, leaves home to marry Tom and they have a son, Johnny. Tom mentally and physically abuses Joy and shows little interest or affection. He has been in prison for four years and, when he is jailed again after being caught attempting a big robbery, Joy and her very young son are left on their own.

After briefly sharing a room with her Aunt Emm, an aging prostitute, Joy moves in with Dave, one of Tom's criminal associates. Dave is tender and understanding, but the idyll is shattered when he is sentenced to 12 years' imprisonment for leading a robbery which results in a woman being blinded, and given his long criminal record, early release seems unlikely. Intending to be faithful to Dave, Joy moves back with Aunt Emm, writes to Dave frequently, and initiates divorce proceedings against Tom.

After taking a job as a barmaid, Joy starts modelling for a seedy photographers' club and drifts into promiscuity. She likes men giving her presents but is too impulsive and easygoing to make a living as a prostitute. Bored with her humdrum surroundings, she dreams of bettering herself. When Tom is released, Joy goes back to him after he promises to move her from her small grotty flat to a modern well-furnished house. However, one evening, after Tom has slapped her several times, Joy goes out and upon returning, she finds Tom watching TV and Johnny missing. Joy frantically searches for Johnny and finally finds him alone on a demolition site where he has gone to play. Realising how much Johnny means to her, Joy decides to stay with Tom despite the abuse, but continues to dream of a future with Dave.

== Main cast ==
- Carol White as Joy
- Terence Stamp as Dave Fuller
- John Bindon as Tom
- Queenie Watts as Aunt Emm
- Kate Williams as Beryl
- Billy Murray as Tom's mate
- Ken Campbell as Mr Jacks
- Tony Selby as customer in pub
- Anna Karen as neighbour
- Michael Standing as young man in field

Credited despite scenes being cut

- Malcolm McDowell as Billy
- George Sewell as customer in pub

== Production ==
=== Development ===
Ken Loach had developed a strong reputation directing television plays including Up the Junction based on stories by Nell Dunn and Cathy Come Home by Dunn's then-husband Jeremy Sandford. Both starred Carol White and were produced by Tony Garnett. Film producer Joseph Janni approached Loach with a two-picture deal, which was to start with a film of Dunn's novel, Poor Cow. Loach wanted Garnett to produce but Janni made this difficult so Garnett was not involved in the film; Loach always regretted this. Loach later recalled "I think Tony would have been far more stringent about how it [Poor Cow] was made and what the content was. I missed his sharpness of mind."

The movie was financed by Nat Cohen of Anglo-Amalgamated, who had previously financed several films produced by Joseph Janni directed by John Schlesinger. Part of the budget was provided by the NFFC.

Loach says Janni insisted on a star playing a role. This led to the casting of Terence Stamp, who had just made Far from the Madding Crowd for Janni. Stamp was cast as Dave, over Loach's choice, Bill Murray. Stamp agreed to play the role for a lesser fee than usual in exchange for a percentage of the profits. John Bindon, who made his film acting debut as White's boyifriend, had been in prison for assault.

=== Filming locations ===
Set in London, the Winstanley and York Road Estates in Battersea were amongst the locations featured prominently in the background.

Terence Stamp later recalled of filming:

We didn’t really have a script... It was just wholly improvised. He had the idea, he had the overall trajectory in his mind, but we didn’t have a script. And, consequently, it had to be Take One because each of us had cameras on us. So before a take, he’d say something to Carol, and then he would say something to me, and we only discovered once the camera was rolling that he’d given us completely different directions. That’s why he needed two cameras, because he needed the confusion and the spontaneity.

Loach did not enjoy the experience of filming. He recalled Janni "brought in people from the film industry and I brought in people I knew from television, and the two didn’t blend. We had more or less two crews working side by side and not mixing." This resulted in the movie going overschedule by several weeks. For the last two weeks of filming White also worked on I'll Never Forget What's'isname which Loach says caused a number of scheduling problems.

=== Music ===
The opening credits attribute the film music to Donovan, although many pop songs such as "Funny How Love Can Be" by the Ivy League and "Not Fade Away" by the Rolling Stones from the era are heard in the film. Three Donovan songs are heard in the film, including the title song. The melody of the title song is repeated instrumentally in diverse arrangements in several parts of the film. It was released as the B-side single to "Jennifer Juniper" in early 1968 in a different arrangement and with altered lyrics. For example, the standard release version opens with the line "I dwell in the north in the green country", while the version in the film opens with the line "I dwell in the town in the grey country".

Other songs by Donovan in the film are "Be Not Too Hard" and "Colours", the latter of which is sung by the character played by Terence Stamp.

== Release ==
=== Box office ===
The film was a surprise success at the box office. It sold to the US for more than its production cost and did extremely well in Italy and Britain. According to Kinematograph Weekly, it was one of four British films in the top ten general releases of 1968. Filmink argued this may have been because the film featured "an established star (Terence Stamp...), a new star (White), and a plenty of sex." Critic Alexander Walker wrote "social realism was mixed with enough raw language, that caught the authentic tone of the street corner, and randy attitudes to sex to insure it the profitable shock of recognition where the popular audience was concerned."

Stamp recalled "within months" of the film's release "I’d made more money than I'd ever earned before" from his percentage.

=== Critical response ===
On the review aggregator site Rotten Tomatoes, Poor Cow has a 50% approval rating based on 16 reviews.

The Monthly Film Bulletin was critical of the film, summing it up as a "superficial, slightly patronising incursion into the nether realms of social realism". The review characterised Loach's direction as an "incongruous mixture of realism and romanticism" that, along with the cinematography, "suffuses the material in a cheery glow of lyricism that often verges on sentimentality."

Writing in The Guardian, Richard Roud criticised the film as "downright awful" and particularly criticised "the tiresomely obvious documentary shots constantly thrown in to emphasise the ugliness of our couple’s surroundings", although he did praise Terence Stamp's performance as "superb".

Film critic Renata Adler of The New York Times wrote in her review: "Poor Cow, which opened yesterday at the Murray Hill and other theaters, begins with some shots of the real birth of a baby, and goes on to become one of those ringingly false Technicolor British films about working-class life in London. It is not very good; but January has been, in general, a poor month for movies, and it might be a good idea to look at the bright side—which, since the quality of the color makes England look like April in Disneyland, is very bright indeed."

In his 2½ star review, Roger Ebert stated that it "isn't a very good movie" but also labeled it as a potential sign for a new phase in recent British films of the time distinct from the social realism and satire films of the time as one made "in equal parts of squalor and techniques."

On the film's re-release in 2016, Kate Muir in The Times gave the film four stars out of five and described the film as "incredibly moving".

White wrote in her memoir "After my comeback in Cathy and Poor Cow, I was hailed as the new Julie Christie, but if one bothers to look back to 1962, there was a time when Julie was called the new Carol White."

Loach was meant to make Flight into Camden by David Storey with Janni as the second part of their two picture deal but Janni elected to not make it.

== Later use ==
Clips of Stamp's performance in Poor Cow were used to show the early life of Wilson, the character he portrays in Steven Soderbergh's film The Limey (1999).

== Notes ==
- Hayward, Anthony (2004). Which side are you on? : Ken Loach and his films.
- Loach, Ken (1998). Loach on Loach. Faber and Faber.
- Stamp, Terence (2017). The ocean fell into the drop.
