= James Stevens (composer) =

English composer (1923–2012)

James Stevens (5 May 1923 – 26 June 2012) was an English composer of symphonic, operatic and avant-garde orchestral music, including film and television scores, as well as pop music of the 1960s.

== Career ==
Stevens was born in London, where he studied initially with Benjamin Frankel in his exclusive class at the Guildhall School of Music. There he won several prestigious awards including the Royal Philharmonic Prize for his First Symphony; the Wainwright Scholarship for "composer of the year"; and a French Government Bursary which took him across the Channel to study with Darius Milhaud at the Paris Conservatoire. There he met Nadia Boulanger, who made him one of her star pupils who received Saturday evening tuition free of charge. He also enjoyed an open invitation to Arthur Honegger's classes.

Stevens commenced his extensive film career while still a student and was acclaimed at the Ealing Studios, where he constantly devised new film music techniques which are now standard practice.

Unusually, Stevens never confined himself to one particular musical genre, and took many opportunities to take part in pop music, jazz, films, television scores, and musicals. His musical Mamízelle Nitouche was revived in London's West End in the autumn of 2001. Although also concerned with serious avant-garde works, his music was melodic rather than atonal.

In one year, he was the only British composer to be selected for the annual International Society for Contemporary Music (with Etymon) while having a disc at number one in the Melody Maker charts (with Exploding Galaxy).

In 1995 he was invited to give a "James Stevens Day" in Cincinnati, shortly after which he was invited by the Musicians Union of Japan to represent English artists at the Hiroshima and Nagasaki 50th anniversary memorial ceremonies.

In 1998, the Cleveland Orchestra Piano Trio gave the world premiere of Concertante a Tre and in 1999 Stevens was commissioned to write David's Round for a 9-year-old prodigy violinist, also in Cleveland, USA. The following year he was commissioned by members of the Cleveland Orchestra to write a work for cello and piano called Duo Per Umanita. Also in 2000 Stevens completed his magnum opus, The Reluctant Masquerade, dealing with the human psyche and the nature of time. In 2001, he wrote the incidental music for American writer Daniel de Cournoyer's one-man theatre show Bells to Helland, also a "Processional" for a wedding in Australia.

He served as head of the Churchill Society Music Department.

== Awards and honors ==
Stevens won the Mendelssohn Scholarship, which even Benjamin Britten had failed to achieve, despite several attempts. After winning the scholarship he spent some time in Berlin at the Hochschule für Musik. He also won the Worshipful Company of Goldsmiths' Award.

In 1990, he was nominated for the BAFTA music award for his contribution to Chelworth—eight one-hour episodes.

Stevens won the BDK International Award in Tokyo for his Buddhist requiem Celebration for the Dead, played by the Tokyo Symphony Orchestra.

== Musical works ==
Orchestral: 1st Symphony – first performed by the BBC Orchestra on Radio 3. 25 mins.2nd Symphony – first performed by the BBC Orchestra on Radio 3. 27 mins.3rd Symphony – 25 mins. first performed by BBC Northern Symphony Orchestra. 25 mins.4th Symphony (Infantes Miseraie – In memoriam Lili Boulanger) – for orchestra and commentator Concerto Capriccioso – harp and small orchestra. 20 mins. Concertetto Concitato – performed by the Prague Sympnony Orchestra 12 mins. Concerto Scenes de Seine – guitar & small orchestra. 22 mins. Lion and Unicorn – overture for orchestra. Eight mins. – first performed by the BBC Orchestra on Radio 3. In a Nutshell – overture for orchestra. 8 mins. – first performed by the BBC Orchestra on Radio 3. Natso No Hikari Ni – translated from Japanese as in the Blinding Flash of Light That Summer – orchestra. 27 mins. Celebration for the Dead – a Buddhist Requiem -Premiered by Tokyo Symphony Orchestra, 37 mins. BDK International AwardThe Reluctant Masquerade- Seppuku and Lullaby, the Buddha Weeps, Satoikoís Song, Natzuko's Song -Prague Sympnony Orchestra 55 mins. Goal! – Commissioned by Brecksville Bees Marching Band, Ohio. First performed at Wembley, England v Argentina, 1980. 10 mins. Celebration – amateur orchestra and chorus, commissioned by Sir Walter St. John School, South London. 20 minsThe Father – amateur orchestra & chorus. first performed Canterbury Sinfonia. 20 mins. Royal Greenwich March – school brass band. Commissioned by Woolwich Polytechnic. 10 mins.

Chamber Works: Etymon 5 players and 3 singers. 22 mins. first performed ISCM at ReykjavikGirl in Scena semi-jazz ensemble. 20 mins. Jigsaw for Pipe 2 recorder quartets & 2 soloists. 18 minsWS Loves WH octet & tenor. 25 mins. Lewis Loves Alice voice & jazz combo. first performed Cincinnati, US. Chelworth brass nonet. Short arrangement of TV series title musicConcertante a Tre for Joseph Walker

Instrumental Works: Kiri to Taiyo – flute and piano.- commissioned by Sunitomo Metal Corporation, TokyoFour Movements & a Coda for viola & piano. BBC 3, 17 mins. Embrionics solo violin. first performance Geoffrey GreyAsonics solo piano, first performance Jonathan Cohen, Wigmore Hall. 20 mins. Guitar – guitar solo. first performance Andreas Herzau, Wigmore Hall. recorded by Andreas Herzau on EMI. 17 mins. Waltzes for Friends – 13 piano piecesDuo Per Umanita piano and cello, performed by Joella Jones and Richard Weiss at Severance Hall in Cleveland, Ohio.15 minsChacone, David's Round for piano and cello performed by Joella Jones and Richard Weiss at Severance Hall in Cleveland Ohio

Film Music: The Insomniac; Intrusion; They Came From Beyond Space; Sparrows Can't Sing; The Weapon; The Baby and the Battleship; Cockleshell Heroes; The Fourth Square; The Other Man; The Secret Pony; The Rival World; East-West Island; Ring Around the Earth; The Oilmen; Flight Deck; The New Vikings; Wednesfield Story; Arabia Felix; Portrait of Queenie a documentary featuring singer Queenie Watts.

Television Music: BBC – The Family Reunion; Tonight; Horizon; Chelworth; Stolen Property.ITV – Uncle Silas; The Alcoholics; Armchair Theatre; Boyd QC; Our Street; After Midnight; America Abroad; The Little Round House; Mr. Papingay's Ship; The Cure.

Radio Music: Echo and the Narcissus; The Salvation of Faust Voices in the Air; Ghost Story

Theatre Works: The Visit – producer Peter Brooks – opened Lunt-Fontane Theatre, New York & Royalty Theatre, LondonGhost Story – one-act opera commissioned by the BBCMamízelle Nitouche- several productions including Pitlochry and WorthingThe Pied Piper – two productions including Theatre Royal, Stratford EastOrpheus in Space – mini rock opera, performed in RomeThe Phantom Lover – Theatre Royal, Stratford East

Pop Works and other recordings: Exploding Galaxy – 1968 pop recording did well on the British pop charts, used the pen name Paul James. Queen High (Stan Tracey's commercial recording debut), Guitar (Andreas Herzau) EMI-Electrola. Lullabulerol -written for his infant nephew, years later recorded by that grown nephew and performed by C.D. SommerEmma's Waltz -written for his infant grand niece, performed by C.D. SommerTime and Space -written from the Poetry of John Hughes, performed by Jackkie Herrick (piano) and Michael McMurray (voice)Rio -unpublished written for Rio Olympic Games.

Organ Works: Etheria- premiered by Gillian Weir in both UK and US; Amo Ergo Sum – as per Etheria, All's Right With the World, Noce
