= Clifford Thurlow =

British ghostwriter

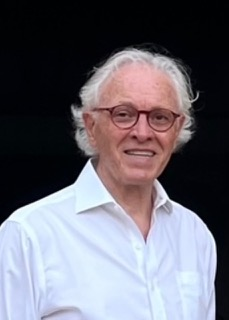
- Clifford Thurlow in Cadaqués, 2023
- Born: July 30, 1948 (age 78); London, England
- Occupation: Writer

Clifford Thurlow (born 1948, in London, England) trained as a journalist after failing to get a place at Cambridge and wrote his first book at the age of 23. He has been described by Penny Wark of The Times as "one of the UK's best ghostwriters."

Thurlow worked as the English editor of the Athens News under Yannis Horn during the last years of the Regime of the Colonels (1967–1974); he was 'asked' to leave the country when he reported on the anti-Junta speech given at the University by German author Günter Grass, who was held briefly under house arrest.

Rather than returning to the UK, Thurlow moved to India where he studied Buddhism in Dharamshala and worked with the Dalai Lama as one of a team translating Tibetan sacred texts into English. He traded gemstones in South East Asia and ran a travelling dolphin show in Spain before moving to Hollywood, where he penned Carol White's autobiography Carol Comes Home.

Thurlow considers Sex, Surrealism, Dali and Me to be his first successful novel (Razor Books, 2000). He is noted for creating memoirs in the style of a novel. Recent books are Fatwa: Living With A Death Threat (Hodder & Stoughton, 2005), which describes the flight of Jacky Trevane across the desert with two children to escape an abusive husband; Today I'm Alice (Sidgwick & Jackson, 2009) the story of Multiple Personality Disorder survivor Alice Jamieson, a Sunday Times Top Ten best-seller; and two books set in Iraq with former infantry captain turned mercenary James Ashcroft, Escape From Baghdad (Virgin, 2009), the rescue of Ashcroft's former Iraqi interpreter and his family from Shia Death Squads; and Making A Killing (Virgin, 2006) – on which Andy Martin wrote in The Daily Telegraph: "Ashcroft must have formed a good working alliance with ghostwriter Clifford Thurlow, because this diary of death and destruction radiates not just personality but that elusive, lyrical honesty the existentialists used to call authenticity."

Thurlow's Runaway (Simon & Schuster, 2013), Emily Mackenzie's story of life as a child prostitute in London's Soho in the early 1970s, spent five weeks in the Sunday Times Top Ten best-seller lists. Published in the wake of the Jimmy Savile child abuse scandal, Runaway was seen as having made an important contribution to the debate on the deficiencies of Britain's child care system.

In 2011, Thurlow became a director of www.yellowbay.co.uk, a publishing house dedicated to "edgy, daring and radical new writing". First digital/print-on-demand publications include Kindle best-selling trilogy The Killer 1,2 & 3, by Jack Elgos, Thurlow's novel Cocaine Confidence and David Pick's Mrs May: A PsychoSexual Odyssey

== Books ==
- 2025 - We Shall Pass, a love story across the classes set among volunteers in the International Brigade during the Spanish Civil War.
- 2024 - How to Rob the Bank of England, true story of Britain's biggest ever robbery.
- 2021 - Typhoon: The Inside Story of an RAF Fighter Squadron at War, Wing Commander Mike Sutton leads 1 (Fighter) Squadron on 300 deadly missions against ISIS.
- 2019 - Operation Jihadi Bride, John Carney's mission to rescue disillusioned jihadi brides from Islamic State.
- 2018 – Gigolo, true life story of how working-class Ben Foster becomes a gigolo to the super-rich; People's Book Prize Finalist 2019
- 2013 – Making Short Films, The Complete Guide From Script to Screen, Bloomsbury Academic; 3rd edition
- 2013 – Runaway, Emily Mackenzie's life as a teenage prostitute
- 2013 – Cool, Sexy & Dead, anthology of short-stories
- 2012 – Cocaine Confidence, novel, the Balkan drug wars move to London
- 2011 – The Second Rule, novel exploring love, loss and early success.
- 2009 – Escape From Baghdad, James Ashcroft rescues his Iraqi interpreter from death squads in Iraq
- 2009 – Today I'm Alice, the story of multiple personality disorder sufferer Alice Jamieson
- 2006 – Making A Killing, the story of Captain James Ashcroft
- 2004 – Fatwa: Living With A Death Threat, the story of Jacky Trevane
- 2003 – The Carol White Story
- 2000 – Sex, Surrealism, Dali and Me, the story of Carlos Lozano's life as an "Ambassador" for the surrealist painter Salvador Dalí.
- 1992 – Brief Spring: A Journey Through Eastern Europe, co-written with Iris Gioia
- 1987 – Never Before Noon, the story of Afdera Fonda
- 1982 – Carol Comes Home, the story of British actress Carol White
