= The Weapon (1956 film) =

British thriller by Val Guest

- Directed by: Val Guest; Hal E. Chester (uncredited)
- Written by: Hal E. Chester; Fred Freiberger
- Produced by: Frank Bevis; Hal E. Chester
- Starring: Steve Cochran; Lizabeth Scott; Herbert Marshall; Nicole Maurey
- Cinematography: Reginald H. Wyer
- Edited by: Peter Rolfe Johnson
- Music by: James Stevens
- Color process: Black and white
- Production company: Periclean Productions
- Distributed by: Eros Films
- Release date: 15 October 1956
- Running time: 82 minutes
- Country: United Kingdom
- Language: English

The Weapon is a 1956 British crime thriller film directed by Val Guest and starring Steve Cochran, Lizabeth Scott, Herbert Marshall, and Nicole Maurey. It was made by Republic Pictures.

A young boy accidentally shoots another boy and flees.

The film's themes were originally explored in the 1951 British film The Yellow Balloon.

== Plot ==
Elsa Jenner is an American war widow who lives in London with her young son Erik. While playing with friends in Aldersgate, Erik hides in the basement of a bomb-damaged building, Erik finds a handgun stuck in a lump of concrete. As all the boys try to pull it free, it accidentally fires a shot from Erik's hands, hitting another boy. Believing he has killed his friend, Erik runs away.

A policeman relates the events to his mother and explains the boy who was shot is alive but in hospital.

Efforts to locate Erik are aided by US Army Captain Mark Andrews, after it is discovered that the gun which Erik found has a past, and was used in a murder of an American serviceman during the war. This background causes a dangerous criminal to pursue the young boy. Erik goes to the cafe where his mum usually works but she is not there. He runs off again just before she arrives with Cpt Andrews. As he inches closer to finding Erik, Andrews comes across Vivienne Pascal, a dance-hall hostess with a connection to the gun's original owner. But she has all but lost her faith in all things good, declaring to Andrews: "I am dead." As Captain Andrews interviews her she is shot through the window by Henry. Andrews pursues him but is overpowered in an empty factory. Disturbed by a policeman Henry jumps out of a window into the Thames.

As Andrews continues his investigation into the gun's whereabouts, Erik's mother Elsa finally locates her son with the helpful assistance of relative stranger Joshua Henry. He falsely alleges that Erik had stolen a bottle of milk from him. Henry starts wooing Elsa, and is at her house when Erik calls. They go to pick him up in Henry's car. Henry persuades them to take him to the gun which is hidden in a ruin. They debate the milk theft and it becomes clear that Henry has ill intentions, prompting Elsa to push Erik out of the car and run away. The car crashes on a bomb site and Elsa is pulled from the wreckage. Henry runs after the boy, onto a bomb site and catches him.

At the crash site, members of the public come to Elsa's aid. Among them is Captain Andrews, with whom Elsa pleads not to worry about her, and to save her son instead. Andrews immediately enters the old building into which Henry was seen running, and Andrews and Henry fight their way higher and higher in the building. Henry falls from the rooftop and is killed.

== Cast ==
- Steve Cochran as Mark Andrews
- Lizabeth Scott as Elsa Jenner
- George Cole as Joshua Henry
- Herbert Marshall as Superintendent Mackenzie
- Nicole Maurey as Vivienne
- Jon Whiteley as Erik
- Laurence Naismith as Jamison
- Stanley Maxted as the Colonel
- Denis Shaw as Groggins
- John Horsley as Johnson
- Fred Johnson as Fitzsimmons
- Frazer Hines as Jimmy (uncredited)
- Peter Godsell as David (uncredited)
- Terry Cooke as Johnny (uncredited)

== Production ==
The film was shot in the east end of London and at Walton Studios, with sets designed by art director John Stoll.

Guest said "Steve Cochran... was a born problem" on the film. "There are certain people who are problems. I was told when we made The Weapon, Lizabeth Scott was a great problem but I didn't have any problems with her at all, in fact she used to come and confide all her problems to me and she had enough problems because her name had just been found in the call girl's book, in New York, in that big trial. I'm sure it's a matter of confidence."

Guest said producer Hal Chester was "a very strange little producer... who really knew more about nothing than anyone else. And he had come from poverty row, full of noises of what he'd done and he was actually one of the Bowery Boys, ... still was and he really knew very little about everything... we shot all around the bomb sites around St Paul's Cathedral, an awful lot on location and some of it on Waterloo Bridge and Lambeth, it wasn't a very startling film, it was a good thriller."

== Critical reception ==
The Monthly Film Bulletin wrote: "This somewhat synthetic re-working of The Yellow Balloon theme, set against varied London backgrounds, is enlivened by two mildly exciting set pieces: a chase through a riverside warehouse and the final fight on top of a gutted building. The international cast performs with routine competence."

Leslie Halliwell said: "Standard suspenser with a cast worthy of something more interesting."

In British Sound Films: The Studio Years 1928–1959 David Quinlan rated the film as "good", writing: "Workmanlike thriller."

Britmovie called the film "a well-crafted, energetic suspense thriller".

Leonard Maltin called it a "minor but trim story of youngster who accidentally shoots his pal and runs away."
