= Romany Jones =

1970s British television series

- Created by: Ronald Chesney; Ronald Wolfe
- Starring: Arthur Mullard; Queenie Watts; James Beck; Jo Rowbottom; Jonathan Cecil; Maureen Sweeney; Kevin Brennan
- Country of origin: United Kingdom
- Original language: English
- No. of series: 4
- No. of episodes: 27

Production
- Running time: 25 minutes
- Production company: London Weekend

Original release
- Network: ITV
- Release: 15 February 1972 – 11 July 1975

Romany Jones is a British sitcom made by London Weekend Television, broadcast between 15 February 1972 and 11 July 1975, involving the comic misadventures of two layabout families living on a caravan site. The show was designed as a vehicle for James Beck (Note: James Beck played the black market spiv Private Walker in the Dad's Army) and also featured Arthur Mullard and Queenie Watts as Wally and Lily Briggs.

Following Beck's death in August 1973, Bert and Betty Jones were written out of the series. Jonathan Cecil and Gay Soper took over the lead roles, playing new neighbours, Jeremy and Susan Crichton-Jones.

The show's pilot episode had been made by Thames Television and broadcast in 1972. It was followed by a spin-off sequel in 1976 entitled Yus, My Dear, starring Mullard and Watts.

Romany Jones has been described by the Radio Times Guide to TV Comedy as being one of the worst British sitcoms ever produced.

== Cast ==
- Arthur Mullard - Wally Briggs
- Queenie Watts - Lily Briggs
- James Beck - Bert Jones (series 1 and 2)
- Jo Rowbottom - Betty Jones (series 1 and 2)
- Kevin Brennan - Mr Gibson (series 1 and 2)
- Maureen Sweeney as Val Finch (series 2-4)
- Jonathan Cecil - Jeremy Crichton-Jones (series 3 and 4)
- Gay Soper - Susan Crichton-Jones (series 3 and 4)
- Alan Ford as Ken (series 3 and 4)

== Series overview ==
Series	Episodes	Originally released	
Series	Episodes	First released	Last released
Pilot		15 February 1972	
1	7	8 June 1973	22 July 1973
2	6	14 September 1973	19 October 1973
3	7	16 August 1974	27 September 1974
4	6	6 June 1975	11 July 1975

== Episodes ==
=== Pilot (1972) ===
No. overall	No. in series	Title	Directed by	Written by	Original release date
1	Pilot	"Romany Jones"	Stuart Allen	Ronald Chesney & Ronald Wolfe	15 February 1972

=== Series 1 (1973) ===
No. overall	No. in series	Title	Directed by	Written by	Original release date
2	1	"The More We Are Together"	Stuart Allen	Jon Watkins	8 June 1973
3	2	"The Ring"	Stuart Allen	Ronald Chesney & Ronald Wolfe	15 June 1973
4	3	"Run Rabbit Run"	Stuart Allen	Chris Boucher	22 June 1973
5	4	"A Rough Night"	Stuart Allen	Ronald Chesney & Ronald Wolfe	29 June 1973
6	5	"The Competition"	Stuart Allen	Geoff Rowley & Andy Baker	6 July 1973
7	6	"An Addition To The Family"	Stuart Allen	Myles Rudge	13 July 1973
8	7	"Look After The Pennies"	Stuart Allen	George Layton & Jonathan Lynn	22 July 1973

=== Series 2 (1973) ===
No. overall	No. in series	Title	Directed by	Written by	Original release date
9	1	"One And One Makes Three"	Stuart Allen	Geoff Rowley & Andy Baker	14 September 1973
10	2	"The Shower"	Stuart Allen	Myles Rudge	21 September 1973
11	3	"Just The Job"	Stuart Allen	Jon Watkins	28 September 1973
12	4	"For Better Or Worse"	Stuart Allen	Jon Watkins	5 October 1973
13	5	"Not So Sweet Charity"	Stuart Allen	Peter Denyer & Graham Hooson	12 October 1973
14	6	"Pack Up Your Troubles"	Stuart Allen	Story by : Roy Tuvey & Maurice Sellar; Teleplay by : Jon Watkins	19 October 1973

=== Series 3 (1974) ===
No. overall	No. in series	Title	Directed by	Written by	Original release date
15	1	"The New Arrivals"	Stuart Allen	Ronald Chesney & Ronald Wolfe	16 August 1974
16	2	"The Invitation"	Stuart Allen	Story by : Chris Boucher; Teleplay by : Jon Watkins	23 August 1974
17	3	"Loot"	Stuart Allen	Myles Rudge	30 August 1974
18	4	"The Dinner"	Stuart Allen	Ronald Chesney & Ronald Wolfe	6 September 1974
19	5	"Love Is All"	Stuart Allen	Henry Charles	13 September 1974
20	6	"She Loves Me, That Bird"	Stuart Allen	Jon Watkins	20 September 1974
21	7	"The Eggs"	Stuart Allen	Ronald Chesney & Ronald Wolfe	27 September 1974

=== Series 4 (1975) ===
No. overall	No. in series	Title	Directed by	Written by	Original release date
22	1	"The Dogsbody"	Stuart Allen	Jon Watkins	6 June 1975
23	2	"Cold Comfort"	Stuart Allen	Ronald Chesney & Ronald Wolfe	13 June 1975
24	3	"The Learner Driver"	Stuart Allen	Ronald Chesney & Ronald Wolfe	20 June 1975
25	4	"A Good Layer"	Stuart Allen	Ronald Chesney & Ronald Wolfe	27 June 1975
26	5	"The Washing"	Stuart Allen	Ronald Chesney & Ronald Wolfe	4 July 1975
27	6	"A Night Out"	Stuart Allen	Ronald Chesney & Ronald Wolfe	11 July 1975

== Trivia ==
- Chris Boucher, later to write extensively for science fiction shows including Doctor Who, Blake's 7 and Star Cops, wrote the episode "Run Rabbit Run".
- Arthur English played Wally Briggs in the pilot episode.
- Mullard and Watts reprised their roles as Wally and Lily in Holiday on the Buses.

== DVD release ==
DVD	Release date
The Complete Series 1	6 June 2011
The Complete Series 2	23 January 2012
The Complete Series 3	8 April 2013
The Complete Series 4	20 January 2014
The Complete Series 1 to 4 Box Set	5 February 2018
