= Yus, My Dear =

- Created by: Ronald Chesney; Ronald Wolfe
- Starring: Arthur Mullard; Queenie Watts; Mike Reid
- Country of origin: United Kingdom
- Original language: English
- No. of series: 2
- No. of episodes: 19

Production
- Running time: 25 minutes (excluding adverts)
- Production company: London Weekend Television

Original release
- Network: ITV
- Release: 9 January – 28 November 1976

Yus, My Dear is a British sitcom that ran for nineteen episodes over two series in 1976 featuring Arthur Mullard and Queenie Watts in the lead roles. It was written by Ronald Chesney and Ronald Wolfe, and produced and directed by Stuart Allen for London Weekend Television. It was screened by ITV during 1976, and marked an early regular TV appearance of the comedian Mike Reid.

A sequel to Chesney and Wolfe's earlier series Romany Jones (1972–75), the characters Wally and Lily Briggs (Mullard and Watts) have left their caravan for a new life in a council house. The new series introduced Wally's brother Benny, the first acting role for the EastEnders and Snatch star Mike Reid of The Comedians fame.

The series, which gained modest ratings, has been described by the Radio Times Guide to TV Comedy as being one of the worst British sitcoms ever produced.

== Cast ==
- Arthur Mullard as Wally Briggs. Lil's Husband and Benny's brother.
- Queenie Watts as Lil Briggs, Wally's wife and Benny's sister-in-law.
- Mike Reid as Benny Briggs, Wally's younger brother, Lil's brother-in-law and Molly's boyfriend.
- Valerie Walsh as Molly, Benny Briggs' girlfriend.
- Pat Nye as Beatrice, Lil's older sister and Wally's sister-in-law. (Seen in episode "Three's Company".)
- Lynda Bellingham as Carol, Benny Briggs' ex-girlfriend. (Seen in episode "Woman Trouble".)
- Peter Hale as Jimmy, Wally and Lil's nephew (No relation to Benny). (Seen in episodes: "The Kid", "The Homework" and "The Repair".)

== DVD release ==
The two series of six and thirteen episodes were released on Region 2 DVD by Network.

DVD	Release date
The Complete Series 1	25 May 2009
The Complete Series 2	5 April 2010
