= Up the Junction (film) =

1968 British film by Peter Collinson

- Original British 1968 quad film poster
- Directed by: Peter Collinson
- Screenplay by: Roger Smith
- Based on: Up the Junction by Nell Dunn
- Produced by: John Brabourne; Anthony Havelock-Allan; Harry Fine (associate producer)
- Starring: Dennis Waterman; Suzy Kendall; Adrienne Posta; Maureen Lipman; Liz Fraser
- Cinematography: Arthur Lavis
- Edited by: John Trumper
- Music by: Mike Hugg; Manfred Mann
- Color process: Technicolor
- Production companies: BHE Films; Collinson/Crasto
- Distributed by: Paramount Pictures
- Release date: 25 January 1968
- Running time: 119 minutes
- Country: United Kingdom
- Language: English

Up the Junction is a 1968 British "kitchen sink" drama film, directed by Peter Collinson and starring Dennis Waterman, Suzy Kendall, Adrienne Posta, Maureen Lipman and Liz Fraser. It is based on the 1963 book of the same name by Nell Dunn and was adapted by Roger Smith. The soundtrack was by Manfred Mann. The film followed Ken Loach's BBC TV adaptation of 1965, but returned to the original book. It generated less controversy and impact than the Loach version.

== Plot ==
The film is set in London in the 1960s and it begins with wealthy young heiress Polly Dean leaving a large house in privileged Chelsea in a chauffeur-driven Rolls-Royce. The Rolls-Royce then moves across the Thames near Battersea Power Station, where Polly gets out of the car and walks away alone with the opening credits following. She moves to a working-class community in Battersea, where she takes a job in Macrindles confectionery factory in an attempt to distance herself from her moneyed upbringing and make her own living. On the factory floor everyone is singing and all are friendly, but perhaps somewhat unhygienic – smoking as they work on the sweets. The other girls mainly discuss men and sex. She meets two working-class sisters, Sylvie and Rube. She is asked to join the two sisters and a few other girls in the factory in the pub, The Pavilion. They get the local boys to buy them drinks. She declines a lift home on a motorbike. Some are heading "up the junction". But Polly walks home.

The next day Polly arrives at Clapham Junction railway station with a suitcase. She is finding a flat of her own. The agent thinks the flat is not good enough for her. She takes it anyway. She goes to the local market and buys a single banana, and eats it on a chair outside a junk shop. The assistant Pete tells her it is not a cafe but when the owner comes out she says she needs furniture so he becomes more friendly. She buys an armchair and a sofa... and also finds a kitten. Pete gives her a lift back to her flat and unloads the furniture. He asks her on a date. He presumes she wants to go to the West End but she says she wants to walk around the streets of Battersea. Polly and Pete then kiss and begin their relationship.

Rube becomes pregnant from her boyfriend Terry and has a traumatic illegal abortion from a slightly senile old woman called Winnie. Rube's mother doesn't know about her pregnancy or her abortion but when she and Polly get home, Polly tells Rube's mother. Furious with Terry, she pushes him down the stairs when he comes over while Rube is screaming upstairs from her miscarriage. Meanwhile, Pete is annoyed with Rube and Sylvie and doesn't help Sylvie when she is attacked by her husband from whom she is separated. Tragedy then strikes when Terry is killed in a motorcycle accident.

Polly and Pete go on a trip to the seaside, travelling by an E-type Jaguar that Pete tells Polly he has hired for the weekend. They argue in their hotel, it becoming clear that Pete envies Polly's access to an easy life, and is frustrated by her rejection of a wealthy lifestyle. His argument with her points out her ability to choose, whereas most people do not have this choice. The argument ends the relationship. He storms off and is caught speeding in the Jaguar which, it transpires, was stolen.

In court Polly and her friends see Pete sentenced to six months' imprisonment. Polly pulls strings to see him in the lock-up for a final word before he is driven away to jail. The film ends with Polly crying while she watches Pete being driven away.

== Cast ==
- Suzy Kendall as Polly
- Dennis Waterman as Pete
- Maureen Lipman as Sylvie
- Adrienne Posta as Rube
- Liz Fraser as Mrs. McCarthy
- Linda Cole as Pauline
- Doreen Herrington as Rita
- Jessie Robins as Lil
- Barbara Archer as May
- Ruby Head as Edith
- Susan George as Joyce
- Sandra Williams as Sheilah
- Michael Robbins as Figgins
- Michael Gothard as Terry
- Billy Murray as Ray
- Michael Standing as John
- Alfie Bass as Charlie
- Aubrey Morris as Creely
- Hylda Baker as Winnie
- Shaun Curry as Ted
- Olwen Griffiths as Fat Lil
- Queenie Watts as Mrs. Hardy
- Lockwood West as magistrate
- Michael Barrington as barrister
- Yvonne Manners as hotel receptionist
- Harry Hutchinson as hotel porter
- Larry Martyn as barrow boy
- Derek Ware as Ted's friend
- Mike Reid as policeman outside courtroom (uncredited)

== Reception ==
=== Box office ===
According to Kinematograph Weekly, there were four British films in the top ten general releases of 1968: Up the Junction, Poor Cow, Here We Go Round the Mulberry Bush and Carry On Doctor.

=== Critical reception ===
Monthly Film Bulletin wrote:

Nell Dunn's sketches of her Battersea friends had a lively and dispassionate warmth that remains at the heart of Roger Smith's screenplay. From her somewhat shapeless material he has fashioned a coherent story substituting Polly for the original's narrator and giving her an emotional relationship with Peter which acts as a continuous thread holding the loosely strung episodes together. Curiously enough, it is this central relationship rather than Miss Dunn's original characters which provides the more successful part of the film. The girl's naive assumption that working class people are somehow more "real" than her own kind is matched by her boyfriend's pathetic belief that money and fast cars are the keys to an earthly paradise. The essential stupidity of these two attractive young people (and their consequent vulnerability) is nicely conveyed in restrained performances by Suzy Kendall and Dennis Waterman, and the atmosphere of their brief idyll is counterpointed by an attractive musical score. But if Peter Collinson has shown sensitivity in his treatment of the love theme, it has deserted him completely with the Battersea backgrounds. The factory scenes, the street brawl, the rowdy sing-song in the pub all emerge as raucous caricature, possibly because they are shot mainly in the kind of huge close-up that works well enough on a nineteen-inch screen but inevitably produces an effect of huge exaggeration in Techniscope and Technicolor. Perhaps the real trouble is that the basic material of Up the Junction, like that of Alfie [1966] and other films of the genre, is best suited to a 90-minute small budget black and white film. As it is, colour and inordinate length now seem to be the order of the day; here they serve only to show up the inexperience of those involved.

In The New York Times, Renata Adler wrote of "the latest in the series of British working-class color films that seem to come from British directors with the regularity of episodes from "Our Gal Sunday", and it is by far the best of them. A lot of things are wrong with it, but a lot is going for it, too". Of the performances, she singled out the "very talented" Suzy Kendall in a challenging role, "a really beautiful piece of characterization by Dennis Waterman", and "strong" support from Adrienne Posta, Maureen Lipman and Michael Gothard. Peter Collinson's direction was also noted for his "well-shot scenes of Battersea and of the candy factory".

The Radio Times Guide to Films gave the film 2/5 stars, writing: "When Ken Loach adapted Nell Dunn's provocative novel Up the Junction for TV in the 1960s, it shocked the nation. Director Peter Collinson's big screen version was more polished, and therein lay his undoing. Loach's semi-documentary style gave Battersea the suitably bleak look that made the central character's decision to move there from Chelsea seem both politically significant and socially courageous. Collinson, however, offers a working-class wonderland and has Suzy Kendall play the girl as a cross between a 1960s supermodel and a melodramatic sob sister".

Leslie Halliwell said: "Socially obsolete sensationalism based on a television semi-documentary. An irritating heroine moves hygienically among motorbikes".
