= Sparrows Can't Sing =

1963 British film by Joan Littlewood

- UK quad poster
- Directed by: Joan Littlewood
- Written by: Stephen Lewis
- Produced by: Donald Taylor
- Starring: James Booth; Barbara Windsor; Roy Kinnear; Avis Bunnage; Brian Murphy; Yootha Joyce
- Cinematography: Desmond Dickinson; Mutz Greenbaum
- Edited by: Oswald Hafenrichter
- Music by: James Stevens; Stanley Black
- Production company: Carthage Productions
- Distributed by: Elstree Distributors; Warner-Pathé
- Release date: 26 February 1963
- Running time: 94 minutes
- Country: United Kingdom
- Language: English

Sparrows Can't Sing is a 1963 British kitchen sink comedy, the only film that Joan Littlewood directed. It starred James Booth and Barbara Windsor. It was written by Stephen Lewis based on his 1960 play Sparrers Can't Sing, first performed at Littlewood's Theatre Workshop in the Theatre Royal Stratford East. The producer was Donald Taylor.

== Plot ==
Cockney sailor Charlie comes home from a two-year voyage to find his house in East London demolished and his wife Maggie missing. She is in fact now living with bus-driver Bert and has a new baby – whose parentage is in doubt. At first, Charlie's friends and family will not tell him where Maggie is, because he is known to have a foul temper, but he hears gossip she has been living with another man. She eventually meets him and they have an uncomfortable conversation. Later, after a confrontation with Bert, Maggie and Charlie leave together, still bickering.

== Cast ==
- James Booth as Charlie Gooding
- Barbara Windsor as Maggie Gooding
- Roy Kinnear as Fred Gooding
- Avis Bunnage as Bridgie Gooding
- Barbara Ferris as Nellie Gooding
- Brian Murphy as Jack
- George Sewell as Bert
- Griffith Davies as Chunky
- Murray Melvin as Georgie
- Arthur Mullard as Ted
- Peggy Ann Clifford as Ted's wife
- Wally Patch as watchman
- Bob Grant as Perce
- Stephen Lewis as caretaker
- Victor Spinetti as Arnold
- Jenny Sontag as Momma
- May Scagnelli as Gran
- Fanny Carby as Lil
- Yootha Joyce as Yootha
- Janet Howse as Janet
- Queenie Watts as Queenie
- John Junkin as bridge operator
- Harry H. Corbett as greengrocer
- Marjie Lawrence as girl
- Glynn Edwards as Charlie's friend
- Gerry Raffles as lorry driver
- Rita Webb as Maggie's neighbour (Uncredited)
- Georgina Mitchell gypsy flower seller in pub
- Sarah Booth as baby in pram (The biological daughter of James Booth).

== Production ==
The film was made on location during the summer of 1962 in Limehouse, Isle of Dogs, Stepney, around the theatre in Stratford, and at Elstree Studios. Sets were occasionally visited by nearby Vallance Road residents the Kray twins. Some sources claim the Krays made a cameo appearance towards the end of the film, but film historian Richard Dacre states this is not the case.

The dialogue is a mixture of Cockney rhyming slang, London Yiddish, and thieves' cant. The New York Times said in its review: "this isn't a picture for anyone with a logical mind or an ear for language. The gabble of cockney spoken here is as incomprehensible as the reasoning of those who speak it." It was also the first English language film to be released in the United States with subtitles.

The original music was by James Stevens, incidental music was composed by Stanley Black.

== Release ==
The world premiere was held on 26 February 1963 at the ABC cinema on the Mile End Road, and was attended by the Earl of Snowdon. Post-film drinks were had at the Kentucky Club, owned by the Kray twins, before the party moved on to another Kray establishment, Esmeralda's Barn in the West End.

The film opened at the Rialto Cinema in the West End on 27 February 1963.

== Reception ==
The Monthly Film Bulletin wrote: "It is easy to be antagonised by one's first impression of this film. Full of jerky movements and sudden cuts, it doesn't seem to hang together at all. One senses a kind of desperation, paralleled by technically uneven sound and lighting, and something outsize about the acting, particularly James Booth's, that a minimal plot can scarcely justify. Then an amused affection sets in. ... Frantic cutting may have spoilt the surface, but Joan Littlewood's first film remains fresh, vigorous and alive beneath. One hopes, that she will pursue her cinematic career in the same irrepressible spirit as that of the Cockneys she so remarkably depicts."

Variety wrote: "Joan Littlewood, who at the Theatre Workshop in London's East End, thumbed her nose cockily at most legit convention and brought a breath of fresh air into the general stuffiness, has now tackled her first film. Her lack of experience stands out like Jimmy Durante's schnozz. At times it irritates. But Sparrows Can't Sing also gains by the sheer ebullience of Miss Littlewood's 'don't give a heck' attitude, at least in certain scenes. ...This is a highly colored and exaggerated version of the Cockney in which everybody is a larger than life character. But the camerawork, straying carelessly around the actual East End streets, is vital and vivid. And the whole effect is one of sheer exuberance."

Leslie Halliwell said: "Relentless caricatured cockney comedy melodrama, too self-conscious to be effective, and not at all likeable anyway."

The Radio Times Guide to Films gave the film 1/5 stars, writing: "You can't capture the sights and sounds of East End life simply by packing the cast with cockneys and touting a camera round the streets of Stepney. James Booth is eminently resistible as the sailor searching for wife Barbara Windsor and her bus-driving fancy man, George Sewell. Missing both social statement and fond characterisation, director Joan Littlewood has succeeded only in being patronising."

== Accolades ==
Barbara Windsor was nominated for the award for Best Actress in a Leading Role by the British Academy Film Awards in 1964.

== Home media ==
A region B Blu-ray was released on 12 October 2015.
