= Arthur Mullard =

British actor (1910–1995)

- Cover of Mullard's 1977 autobiography
- Born: Arthur Ernest Mullord; 19 September 1910; Islington, London, England
- Died: 11 December 1995 (aged 85); Islington, London, England
- Occupations: Actor, singer
- Years active: 1939–1995
- Spouse: Florence Rose (m. 1939; died 1961)
- Children: 3
- Military career
- Allegiance: United Kingdom
- Branch: British Army
- Rank: Warrant officer
- Unit: Royal Artillery
- War: Second World War

Arthur Ernest Mullard (né Mullord; 19 September 1910 - 12 November 1995) was an English actor and singer.

Following military service and a brief boxing career, Mullard found work as a cockney character actor in film and TV comedy, notably in the series Romany Jones.

== Career ==
=== Acting ===
Following the end of the war in 1945, Mullard sought work as a stuntman at Pinewood and Ealing film studios, from which he drifted into uncredited bit-parts in British films including Oliver Twist (1948), The Lavender Hill Mob (1951) and The Ladykillers (1955).

Mullard's face and cockney accent lent themselves to a certain character and he graduated to more visible roles in comedy films and on television. It was on television that Mullard made a name for himself, first as a straight man for Tony Hancock, Frankie Howerd and Benny Hill, then in The Arthur Askey Show. It was the London Weekend Television series Romany Jones, first aired in 1973, which gave Mullard his highest profile, playing Wally Briggs, a crafty caravan-dweller. Although popular at the time, the show did not find critical favour and has subsequently been named by one source, the Radio Times Guide to TV Comedy, as one of the poorer British sitcoms made.

So popular was Mullard's character that a sequel, Yus, My Dear, was broadcast in 1976, in which Wally and his wife Lily (Queenie Watts) had moved out of their caravan into a council house. The series gained modest ratings, but was a disaster critically, being described by the Radio Times Guide to TV Comedy as being one of the worst British sitcoms ever produced.

Mullard (or "Arfur", as he was widely known) was regularly a guest in other programmes and television commercials. He was a frequent panellist in TV comedy quiz show Celebrity Squares, hosted by comedian Bob Monkhouse. He and Watts also reprised their roles of Wally and Lily appearing in the film Holiday on the Buses (1973), the last feature-length version of the popular On the Buses comedy series of the time.

Mullard also appeared in Ladies Who Do (1963), Morgan! (1966), The Great St Trinian's Train Robbery (1966), Chitty Chitty Bang Bang (1968) and Adventures of a Plumber's Mate (1978). In 1986, invited by producer Victor Lewis-Smith, Mullard hosted an edition of Midweek on BBC Radio 4 to replace regular host Libby Purves during her temporary absence.

=== Music ===
In 1967, Mullard recorded "I Love You, You Love Me" and "Was It Something I Said?" on the Masquerade label (MA5001). This was followed the same year by an album, Arthur Mullard of London (MQ 2003). This included his cover of the Beatles' "Yesterday", jokes, and philosophy. More singles followed in the 1970s, including 1974's "Not Now Arthur" / "If I Only Had My Time Again" (BASFBA 1012), and in 1975 "I Only Have Eyes for You" / "One 'Fing 'N' Annuver" (RCA 2610) with "Yus My Dear" / "Arthur" (RCA Z639A) being released in 1976.

He entered the UK Singles Chart in 1978 with his cover of "You're the One That I Want" (Pye 7N 46121) (from the film Grease), a duet with fellow comedy actor Hylda Baker, who was in her seventies. The single, which peaked at number 22 in the UK, was taken from the album Band on the Trot (Pye PKL 5576). The single was his last professional success during Mullard's life; there followed an uncredited narration on the Glenn Close-led live-action 101 Dalmatians, released in 1996, after his death.

== Personal life and abuse allegations ==
Mullard continued to live in a council house in Islington after his success and spent much of his free time socialising in local pubs. He wrote an autobiography, Oh, Yus, It's Arthur Mullard, which was published in 1977. Mullard died in his sleep on 11 December 1995, aged 85. He married Florence Rose in 1939, and the couple had three children: Brian, Barbara and Johnny. Florence died in 1961, aged 48.

In May 1996, five months after his death, the Sunday Mirror reported that a This Is Your Life episode about Mullard had been planned, but it was cancelled. This came after the show's producers contacted Mullard's eldest son, Brian, who had left home after "a massive row" with his father, and heard his allegations of Mullard's history of domestic violence and of sexual abuse of his daughter Barbara, beginning when she was 13 in the early 1950s. Despite his alleged child sexual abuse against Barbara, which she recounted in an interview with the Sunday Mirror, she had nursed him in his dotage. He left her and one of her brothers £5,000 each, and £250,000 to a children's home. It was reported at the time that Mullard's son Johnny had become a successful comedian in Sydney, Australia; he defended his father as generous and supportive and stated that in his view, the allegations resulted from a "bust up" between Mullard and his daughter over Mullard's money, resulting in his decision to leave it to charity.

Mullard's wife Florence had committed suicide in 1961 by taking an overdose of sleeping tablets, after suffering from poor physical and mental health for several years. Her death was claimed by Barbara to be partly the result of the extreme physical and mental violence Mullard perpetrated against her. According to Barbara, Florence left a suicide note which said, "I don't want to live any more because of what you're doing with Barbara. Please look after my Johnny." Barbara claimed that Mullard tore up the note after showing it to her, making them the only two to have seen it.

== Partial filmography ==
- To the Public Danger (1948) – Man standing at bar (uncredited)
- Man on the Run (1949) – Man standing at bar (uncredited)
- Girdle of Gold (1952) – Police officer
- Behind the Headlines (1953 film) – A man at a desk (uncredited)
- The Extra Day (1956) – Barney's Second (uncredited)
- My Teenage Daughter (1956) – Club Bouncer (uncredited)
- Dial 999 (1958) – Morris (uncredited) – (' The Killing Job ', episode)
- The Bank Raiders (1958) – Linders
- The Haunted Strangler (1958) – Asylum Attendant (uncredited)
- The Man Who Liked Funerals (1959) – Renny Fiasco
- Two-Way Stretch (1960) – Fred
- And the Same to You (1960) – Tubby
- Dentist on the Job (1961) – (uncredited)
- On the Fiddle (1961) – Thirsty Man Getting Off Bus (uncredited)
- Postman's Knock (1962) – Sam
- It's Trad, Dad! (1962) – police chief
- Crooks Anonymous (1962) – Grogan
- Band of Thieves (1962) – Getaway
- The Loneliness of the Long Distance Runner (film) (1962) – Borstal Officer
- Sparrows Can't Sing (1963) – Ted
- The Wrong Arm of the Law (1963) – Brassknuckles
- Heavens Above! (1963) – (uncredited)
- Ladies Who Do (1963) – Mr. Merryweather
- Father Came Too! (1964) – traffic warden
- The Counterfeit Constable (1964) – Le malfaiteur
- The Wednesday Play, 'Dan, Dan, the Charity Man' (1964) — as Huge Man
- Gonks Go Beat (1965) – drum master
- Morgan – A Suitable Case for Treatment (1966) – Wally
- The Great St. Trinian's Train Robbery (1966) – Big Jim
- Cuckoo Patrol (1967) – Yossle
- Smashing Time (1967) – cafe boss
- Chitty Chitty Bang Bang (1968) – Cyril
- Lock Up Your Daughters (1969) – night watchman
- Crooks and Coronets (1969) – Perce
- The Vault of Horror (1973) – Gravedigger (segment 4 "Bargain in Death")
- Holiday on the Buses (1973) – Wally Briggs
- Three for All (1975) – Ben
- Adventures of a Plumber's Mate (1979) – Blackie
- Mind Your Language (1979) on episode "The School Fete" – himself (guest appearance)
- 101 Dalmatians (1996) – Voice (uncredited)

== Radio ==
- Midweek (BBC Radio 4) – Host – (May 1986), 1 episode

== Bibliography ==
- Mullard, Arthur Oh, Yus, It's Arthur Mullard, autobiography, published by Everest, London, 1977; ISBN 9780905018317
