= Jessie Robins =

British actress (1905–1991)

- Jessie Robins in The Saint 1963
- Born: June 5, 1905
- Died: August 10, 1991 (aged 86)

Jessie Robins (5 June 1905 – 10 August 1991) was an English actress whose career lasted from 1958 to 1974. She was best recognised as Ringo Starr's "Auntie Jessie" in The Beatles' made-for-television musical film Magical Mystery Tour and as the innkeeper's wife in Roman Polanski's The Fearless Vampire Killers.

== Work ==
Her television and film work includes:

Year	Title	Role	Notes
1958	The Benny Hill Show	Various Roles	1 episode
1959	Danger Within	Lady in Cafe	Film, Uncredited
1959	Breakout	Lady in Cafe	Uncredited
1961	The Kitchen	Bertha	Film
1961	The Younger Generation	Elsie	Episode: "Goodbye Charlie"
1961	The Pursuers	Samantha Rock	Episode: "The Web"
1961-1967	Armchair Theatre	Ma / Edna Jacobs / Mrs. Cohen	3 episodes
1963	Billy Liar	Woman at Hospital	Film, Uncredited
1963	The Saint	Maria Calvetti / Hotelier	2 episodes
1963	The Sentimental Agent	Woman on Plane	Episode: "A Very Desirable Plot"
1963	What a Crazy World	Fat Woman	Film
1965	The Wednesday Play	Fat Lil	Episode: "Up the Junction"
1967	Woman Times Seven	Marianne, Edith's maid	Film, (segment "Super Simone")
1967	Magical Mystery Tour	Ringo's Auntie Jessie	TV movie
1967	The Fearless Vampire Killers	Rebecca Shagal	Film
1968	Dixon of Dock Green	Beatrice	Episode: "Nightmare"
1968	Up the Junction	Fat Lil	Film
1968	Mrs. Brown, You've Got a Lovely Daughter	Woman in pub	Film
1968	Chitty Chitty Bang Bang	Pastry Cook	Film, Uncredited
1969	Wild, Wild Women	Blossom	6 episodes
1969	The Best House in London	Machinist	Film, Uncredited
1970	Doctor in Trouble	Ship passenger beside Llewellyn Wendover	Film, Uncredited
1974	The Black Windmill	Passenger on the bus beside Tarrant	Film, Uncredited, (final film role)
