= Jacky Trevane =

British writer

Jennifer Anne, commonly known by the pseudonym Jacky Trevane, is a British woman who is famous for running away from her husband in 1992.

== Biography ==
Jacky was twenty-three when she arrived in Egypt for a holiday with her boyfriend, Dave. Separated from Dave in a bustling street, she fell and twisted her ankle, at which point she was helped by a young local. After falling in love, they married and she converted to Islam. The couple lived with him in a poor suburb of Cairo and had two daughters. Their marriage, however, turned sour and Jennifer decided to return to England. She says a fatwa was issued against her and therefore she is "living in the shadow of a death threat". The Egyptian publication Al-Fajr spoke with Jennifer's husband, who denied many of the claims Trevane made.

With the help of Clifford Thurlow, a ghostwriter, she published the book Fatwa: Living with a Death Threat in 2004, which told the story of her life with her husband Maged, whom she called Omar in the book. In 2005, she compiled a book titled Invisible Women: Living in Secrecy to Survive from eight stories of women who had contacted her after reading the book.
