= Never Let Go (1960 film) =

1960 British film by John Guillermin

- British quad poster
- Directed by: John Guillermin
- Written by: Alun Falconer
- Story by: John Guillermin; Peter de Sarigny
- Produced by: Peter de Sarigny
- Starring: Richard Todd; Peter Sellers; Elizabeth Sellars; Adam Faith; Carol White
- Cinematography: Christopher Challis
- Edited by: Ralph Sheldon
- Music by: John Barry
- Production company: Julian Wintle/Leslie Parkyn Productions
- Distributed by: Rank Film Distributors
- Release date: 7 June 1960 (London)
- Running time: 90 minutes
- Country: United Kingdom
- Language: English

Never Let Go (also known as Moment of Truth) is a 1960 British thriller film directed by John Guillermin and starring Richard Todd, Peter Sellers and Elizabeth Sellars. It was written by Alun Falconer. The film follows John Cummings, a man who attempts to recover his stolen car.

== Plot ==
Lionel Meadows is a London garage owner who deals in stolen cars. Meadows buys log books from scrapped models, then has other cars corresponding to the log books stolen and the number plates replaced. He gives a list of cars to young petty thief Tommy Towers, which includes a 1959 Ford Anglia. The car Tommy steals belongs to struggling cosmetics salesman John Cummings, who needs the car to keep his job but who could not afford to insure the car against theft. Desperate to recover it, Cummings learns that he is going to lose his job to Cyril Spink, a younger colleague.

Alerted to Tommy by a street newspaper vendor, Alfie Barnes, who witnessed the crime, Cummings starts investigating the activities of Meadows and his associates. Meadows, disturbed by his inquiries, first brutalises Tommy and then Alfie, who dies of suicide.

Meadows discovers Cummings breaking into his garage and has him beaten up, yet Cummings persists in his attempts to recover his car, even after being warned off by police. It emerges that, since his demobilisation from the army, Cummings has failed at several enterprises because of poor judgement and a lack of persistence. At work, he reacts violently to his younger replacement Spink and summarily quits.

Cummings eventually finds the weak link in Meadows's operation: his mistress Jackie, a teenage runaway who was once Tommy's girlfriend but whom Meadows continually threatens and abuses. Cummings takes Jackie under his wing, but Meadows invades Cummings's flat and threatens Jackie and the Cummings family. Though formerly supportive, Cummings's wife Anne threatens to take their children Martin and Sandra and leave her husband if he goes after Meadows.

Jackie goes back to Tommy, whom Meadows has attacked yet again, then calls Cummings to tell him that she and Tommy will give him evidence against Meadows. The police are less interested in recovering Cummings's car than in making a major case against Meadows and his car theft ring. Cummings, who has vowed not to give up, decides to take matters into his own hands, while Meadows is obsessed with keeping the stolen Ford and killing Cummings. He lies in wait for Cummings, who again breaks into the garage. This time Cummings is the winner in a bloody fight, and the police, called by Tommy and Jackie, arrest Meadows. The battered Cummings drives home to find the flat empty, but Anne returns and embraces him.

== Cast ==
- Richard Todd as John Cummings
- Peter Sellers as Lionel Meadows
- Elizabeth Sellars as Anne Cummings
- Adam Faith as Tommy Towers
- Carol White as Jackie
- Mervyn Johns as Alfie Barnes
- Noel Willman as Inspector Thomas
- David Lodge as Cliff
- Peter Jones as Alec Berger
- John Bailey as Mackinnon
- Nigel Stock as Regan
- John Le Mesurier as Pennington
- John Dunbar as Station Sergeant
- Charles Houston as Cyril Spink
- Cyril Shaps as Cypriot
- Dorothy Gordon as Typist
- Mignon O'Doherty as Manageress
- Maureen Connell as Stores Girl
- Marianne Stone as Madge
- Peter Pike as Martin Cummings
- Roberta Tovey as Sandra Cummings

== Production ==
The idea for the film began when director John Guillermin had his car stolen. He mentioned it to the producer, Peter de Sarigny, and they discussed what would happen if your livelihood was completely dependent on a car that had been stolen. They developed a story outline which they gave to writer Alun Falconer to turn into a script. Richard Todd wrote in his memoir In Camera, an Autobiography Continued that the film was "rather offbeat in style for a British picture, with a splendid cast of skilled oldtimers and some interesting newcomers, and a very definite change of character casting for me, it was to be one of my favourite movies."

Filming began November 1959 with shooting on location in London and studio work at Beaconsfield. Much of the action takes place in the largely redeveloped Chichester Place, Paddington. Carol White said that during filming she had affairs with Adam Faith, Todd and Peter Sellers.

== Reception ==
=== Box office ===
According to Todd, the film received "mixed reviews" which he attributed to the casting of himself and Sellers in atypical roles but "nevertheless, the film subsequently did well." Kinematograph Weekly said the film was a "winner" at the 1960 box office although did not list it as a "money maker".

=== Critical ===
The Monthly Film Bulletin wrote (1963):

A short synopsis cannot hope to do justice to the sadistic impulse that appears to have guided John Guillermin through this unlovely exercise. From the initial finger-crushing lesson that Meadows offers Towers, to the final finger-crushing door slam that Meadows catches from Cummings, Never Let Go runs full circle through every type of violence this side of an X-certificate. Obtrusive shock-cutting, exaggerated camera angles, and a selfconsciously strident use of "adult" language all serve to accentuate the essential falsity of the characterisations, and to advertise Never Let Go as a product of the new "traumatic" school of independent British film-making. Peter Sellers almost succeeds in establishing the ruthless car dealer as a study of a twisted personality, almost fascist in his objective brutality; but this role, like Richard Todd's oddly appealing salesman, with his fake horn-rimmed spectacles and his nervous laugh, is quickly sacrificed to the demands of a script which, if it offers more than a frame for violence with undertones of the now fashionable criticism of police methods, makes a strong plea for comprehensive car insurance.

The New York Times described Sellers "grinding his way through the rubble of a drearily routine plot" and attributed his performance in the film, different from his usual comedic roles, to "That itch to play Hamlet, I suppose; a desire to change his pace, which Mr. Sellers has often proclaimed he likes to do".

The Radio Times Guide to Films gave the film 1/5 stars, writing: "What was intended to be a gritty insight into the brutality of the underworld ends up being a tatty melodrama in this misfire from director John Guillermin. Peter Sellers is cast against type as the leader of a stolen car racket, whose ruthless methods prompt victim Richard Todd and street punk Adam Faith to forge an unlikely alliance against him. Alun Falconer's script does nobody any favours, with Sellers reduced to embarrassing histrionics in the bid to shed his comic image."

Leslie Halliwell wrote: "Brutishly unattractive thriller, apparently designed for the sole purpose of giving Peter Sellers a villainous part."

Time Out wrote: "Cosmetics salesman Todd has his car stolen and, without insurance or much assistance from the police, decides to track it down himself. The trail leads through youthful thug Faith to gang boss Sellers (taking a rare tilt at a villainous role) in this stolid homegrown crime caper, considered very brutal in its day, with a self-consciously strident use of 'adult' language. Quite persuasive turns from Todd and Sellers."

FilmInk said: "It's a gripping crime tale, with modest ambitions but made with terrific pace by Guillermin."

Olaf Möller wrote in Film Comment: "The only Guillermin film that was somewhat in synch with the fashion of the day is Never Let Go ... an excursion into England's underworld that functions as a perfectly constructed parable about the new middle class's fear of falling – a kitchen-sink noir..."

== Home media ==
Never Let Go was released to DVD by MGM Home Video on 7 June 2005, as a Region 1 fullscreen DVD.
