= Nutcracker (film) =

- Directed by: Anwar Kawadri
- Written by: Raymond Christodoulou
- Story by: Max Roman; Yvonne Roman
- Produced by: Panos Nicolaou
- Starring: Joan Collins; Carol White; Paul Nicholas
- Cinematography: Peter Jessop
- Edited by: Max Benedict
- Music by: Simon Park
- Production company: Jershaw
- Distributed by: J. Arthur Rank Film Distributors
- Release dates: 17 December 1982: November 1984 (U.S.)
- Running time: 101 minutes
- Country: United Kingdom
- Language: English

Nutcracker is a 1982 British drama film directed by Anwar Kawadri and starring Joan Collins, Carol White and Paul Nicholas.

== Premise ==
Set during the Cold War, the story concerns a Soviet ballerina who attempts to defect to the West and settle in London.

== Cast ==
- Joan Collins as Laura Carrere
- Carol White as Margaux Lasselle
- Paul Nicholas as Mike McCann
- Finola Hughes as Nadia Gargarin
- William Franklyn as Sir Arthur Cartwright
- Leslie Ash as Sharon
- Murray Melvin as Leopold
- Vernon Dobtcheff as Markovitch
- Geraldine Gardner as Markova
- Cherry Gillespie as Mireille
- Jane Wellman as Grace
- Ed Bishop as Sam Dozier
- Jo Warne as Madame Olga
- Martin Burrows as Tom
- Fran Fullenwider as Vi
- Anna Bergman as Tashi
- Nicola Austin as Sylvie
- Olivier Pierre as Alex Lasalle
- Steve Kelly as Boris
- Richard Marner as Popov
- Morgan Sheppard as George Peacock
- Patti Hammond as Sue

== Production ==
Collins had appeared in two popular vehicles, The Stud and The Bitch which led to her casting on Dynasty. She made Nutcracker over six weeks during early 1982 in between season one and two of Dynasty. The director had only made short films.

Carol White stormed out of a screening after seeing she had been shown topless, contrary to previous assurances.

== Reception ==
The Guardian called the film "living testament to the propensity of the British happily to survive the dollops of soft porn with Joan Collins at its gooey centre."

== Bibliography ==
- Upton, Julian. Fallen Stars: Tragic Lives and Lost Careers. Headpress/Critical Vision, 2004.
