= Daddy's Gone A-Hunting (1969 film) =

1969 film by Mark Robson

- Theatrical poster
- Directed by: Mark Robson
- Screenplay by: Larry Cohen; Lorenzo Semple, Jr.
- Produced by: Mark Robson
- Starring: Carol White; Paul Burke; Scott Hylands
- Cinematography: Ernest Laszlo
- Edited by: Dorothy Spencer
- Music by: John Williams
- Distributed by: National General Pictures
- Release date: July 2, 1969
- Running time: 108 minutes
- Country: United States
- Language: English
- Box office: $2.9 million (US/Canada rentals)

Daddy's Gone A-Hunting is a 1969 American thriller film directed by Mark Robson and starring Carol White, Paul Burke, and Scott Hylands. Its title comes from the lullaby "Bye, baby Bunting". A novelization of the film was released in the same year. This is the first film directed by Robson after his 1967 box office hit Valley of the Dolls.

== Plot ==
Cathy Palmer, a young British woman, moves to San Francisco, where she meets Kenneth Daly and begins a relationship with him. She becomes pregnant, but when she sees another side of Kenneth's personality, she decides to break off their engagement and abort the pregnancy.

Some time later, Cathy meets and marries Jack Byrnes, who has political ambitions. Kenneth, however, continues to be disturbed by the way Cathy ended their romance, and soon comes back into her life. After Cathy gives birth to Jack's baby, Kenneth demands that she kill the child as retribution for the one she aborted earlier.

== Cast ==
- Carol White as Cathy Palmer
- Paul Burke as Jack Byrnes
- Mala Powers as Meg Stone
- Scott Hylands as Kenneth Daly
- James Sikking as Joe Menchell
- Walter Brooke as Jerry Wolfe
- Matilda Calnan as Ilsa
- Gene Lyons as Dr. Blanker
- Dennis Patrick as Dr. Parkington
- Rachel Ames as Dr. Parkington's Nurse
- Barry Cahill as FBI Agent Crosley

== Critical reception ==
The film received praise for its climactic sequence atop the Mark Hopkins Hotel, but also earned criticism for its plot devices and dialog. Roger Ebert wrote Daddy's Gone A-Hunting "has a lot of things wrong with it, but it does function on the promised level. It absorbs you, it places the macabre firmly in the midst of the commonplace (like good Hitchcock), and in the end it really does scare you".

== See also ==
- List of American films of 1969
