= Carol White =

British actress (1943–1991)

- Born: Carole Joan White; 1 April 1943; Hammersmith, London, England, UK
- Died: 16 September 1991 (aged 48); Miami, Florida, U.S.
- Resting place: Mortlake Cemetery
- Occupation: Actress
- Years active: 1949–1991
- Spouses: Michael King; Dr Stuart Lerner; Michael Arnold
- Children: Sean King; Steve King
- Relatives: Joseph Ernest White (1910–1976); Joan Mabel Gertrude White (1913–1973)

Carole Joan White (1 April 1943 – 16 September 1991) was an English actress.

White became famous for her performances in the television play Cathy Come Home (1966) and the films Poor Cow (1967) and I'll Never Forget What's 'isname (1967), and by the end of the 1960s was hailed as 'the next Julie Christie'. Alcoholism and drug abuse damaged her career, however, and from the early 1970s she worked infrequently.

== Early life and education ==
White, the daughter of a scrap merchant, was born in Hammersmith, London on 1 April 1943. She attended the Corona Stage Academy.

== Career ==
White played minor parts in films from 1949 until the late 1950s, when she began to play more substantial supporting roles in films such as Carry On Teacher (1959) and Never Let Go (1960), in which she played the girlfriend of Peter Sellers. She also acted the part of Evelyn May, a 'girl in the bar' and court witness in Sidney J. Furie's The Boys (1962).

After marrying, she became disenchanted with acting due to the quality of her roles. She moved back to her home borough of Hammersmith to settle down to married life. Growing bored with it, White began to audition for roles again and was cast in the television version of Nell Dunn's Up the Junction (1965) by director Ken Loach. She followed this up with two other Wednesday Plays for Loach, The Coming Out Party (1965) and Cathy Come Home (1966), which made her a TV star in the UK.

She followed this success with the lead in Loach's film Poor Cow (1967), based on another Nell Dunn book, which brought her international renown. She also appeared in I'll Never Forget What's'isname with Oliver Reed in 1967, by which time her career was approaching its apogee. White followed this up by co-starring opposite Alan Bates and Dirk Bogarde in John Frankenheimer's film adaptation of Bernard Malamud's The Fixer (1968), which was a critical success.

Subsequently, she travelled to Hollywood in 1968 to make Daddy's Gone A-Hunting (1969) under National General Pictures. Her career started to cool off by the time she appeared in Andrew V. McLaglen's western comedy, Something Big (1971), which starred Dean Martin. Back in the UK, she had major roles in Dulcima, alongside John Mills (1971), and Made (1972), with the singer Roy Harper.

During the late 1960s, White was considered one of the most promising actresses in British cinema, but her alcoholism and substance abuse, as well as unhappy relationships with male stars such as Richard Burton, Frank Sinatra, Oliver Reed and Paul Burke, hindered her career. She did, however, have a prominent role as a hostage in The Squeeze (1977).

After living in Hollywood for several years, White returned to London to star in Nell Dunn's play Steaming at the Comedy Theatre in the West End, and filmed Nutcracker at the same time. Despite receiving excellent reviews for Steaming, she was often late, or else missed performances altogether, and was finally sacked.

In 1982, a biography, Carol Comes Home by Clifford Thurlow, was published. Although White received plenty of publicity for both the play and the biography, she was unable to revive her career. She returned to the United States, where she lived the rest of her life.

== Personal life ==
White dated Terence Stamp, who also had been involved with Julie Christie, the actress she was most compared to. Stamp introduced her to Lionel Bart, who introduced her to her future husband Michael King, of The King Brothers pop group. They settled down in Hammersmith, where she had been born, and raised their two children, Sean and Stephen.

== Death ==
White died in 1991 in Florida, at the age of 48. The cause of her death is disputed, with some sources claiming she had a drug overdose, and others (The Sunday Times in 1991 and Julian Upton, writing in 2004) suggesting she succumbed to liver disease, brought on by chronic alcoholism.

== Legacy ==
A television film of her life, The Battersea Bardot, was shown in 1994, with White portrayed by Wendy Morgan.

== Filmography ==
- Kind Hearts and Coronets (1949) – Young Sibella (uncredited)
- Doctor in the House (1954) – Bit Role (uncredited)
- The Belles of St Trinian's (1954) – Schoolgirl (uncredited)
- A Prize of Gold (1955) – German Refugee (uncredited)
- Doctor at Sea (1955) – Bit Role (uncredited)
- An Alligator Named Daisy (1955) – Girl (uncredited)
- Now and Forever (1956) – Bit Part (uncredited)
- My Teenage Daughter (1956) – Minor Role (uncredited)
- Moby Dick (1956) – Young Girl (uncredited)
- Circus Friends (1956) – Nan
- Around the World in 80 Days (1956) – Minor Role (uncredited)
- Blue Murder at St. Trinian's (1957) – Schoolgirl (uncredited)
- The Golden Disc (1958) – Bit Part (uncredited)
- The 39 Steps (1959) – Schoolgirl in Assembly Hall (uncredited)
- Web of Suspicion (1959) – (uncredited)
- Carry On Teacher (1959) – Sheila Dale – Saboteur
- Never Let Go (1960) – Jackie
- Beat Girl (1960) – Girl at The Off-Beat Café (uncredited)
- Surprise Package (1960) – Sexy Teenager (uncredited)
- Linda (1960) – Linda
- The Man in the Back Seat (1961) – Jean
- A Matter of WHO (1961) – Beryl
- All Night Long (1962) – Lucille (uncredited)
- Village of Daughters (1962) – Natasha Passoti (A Daughter)
- Gaolbreak (1962) – Carol Marshall
- Bon Voyage! (1962) – Penelope Walthorne (uncredited)
- The Boys (1962) – Evelyn May
- Ladies Who Do (1963) – Sandra
- Gideon's Way (1964, TV episode "The Rhyme and the Reason") – Winifred Norton
- A Hard Day's Night (1964) – Minor Role (uncredited)
- The Playground (1965) – Virginia Williams
- Up the Junction (1965, TV) – Sylvie
- Cathy Come Home (1966, TV) – Cathy
- Prehistoric Women (1967) – Gido
- Poor Cow (1967) – Joy
- I'll Never Forget What's'isname (1967) – Georgina Elben
- The Fixer (1968) – Raisl
- Daddy's Gone A-Hunting (1969) – Cathy Palmer
- The Man Who Had Power Over Women (1970) – Jody Pringle
- Dulcima (1971) – Dulcima Gaskain
- Something Big (1971) – Dover McBride
- Made (1972) – Valerie Marshall
- Some Call It Loving (1973) – Scarlett
- Hawaii Five-O (1974, TV) – Marni Howard
- The Squeeze (1977) – Jill
- Nutcracker (1982) – Margaux Lasselle (final film role)
