= Jo Rowbottom =

British character actress (born 1942)

- Born: 1942 (age 83–84); London, England
- Occupation: Actress
- Known for: The Evil of the Daleks; Romany Jones; Little Women; I, Claudius

Josephine Rowbottom (born 1942) is a British character actress, best known for guest roles in numerous British TV series and as James Beck's wife in Romany Jones.

== Film credits ==
- Night of the Prowler (1962) - Elsie
- The Bargee (1964) - Cynthia (credited as Jo Rowbotham)
- You Must Be Joking! (1965) - irate mother in library (uncredited)
- The Liquidator (1965) - Betty
- Follow That Camel (1967) - Harem Girl (uncredited)
- Two a Penny (1968) - Helen
- Along the Way (1972) (credited as Jo Rowbotham)
- That Summer! (1979) - Pub landlady

== Selected television credits ==
- Steptoe and Son (Series 2, 1963) - 'Is That Your Horse Outside?' - Waitress
- Gideon's Way (1964, TV episode "The rhyme and the reason") - Mary Rose
- The Sullavan Brothers (1964) - Joyce Warren
- Z-Cars (1964–1972) - Kate Gordon / Joyce Alty / Micki / Stella Aldridge
- Mogul (1965) - Kitt Body
- Dixon of Dock Green (1966–1976) - Julie Taylor / Joyce / Jessie Copeland / Rosie Everett / Sheila Thompson / Sylvia / Jean
- The Baron (1966) - Jane
- Watch the Birdies (1966) - Marcia
- Doctor Who (in the serial The Evil of the Daleks) (1967) - Mollie Dawson
- Sinister Street (1969) - Daisy Palmer
- Spyder's Web (1972, TV episode "Things That Go Bang in the Night") - Debbie
- Romany Jones (1972–1973) - Betty Jones
- The Rivals of Sherlock Holmes (1971) - The Assyrian Rejuvenator - Suzie Shepherd
- Sam and the River (1975) - Katie Leigh
- Moody and Pegg ('Full House') 1975) - Gloria
- I, Claudius (1976) - Calpurnia
- Dick Turpin (1979–1980) - Mary / Mrs. Smith
- The Professionals (1980) - Barmaid
- Terry and June (1981) - Cynthia
- Jack of Diamonds (1983) - Chambermaid
- The Franchise Affair (1988) - Mildred Pinner
- The Bill (1989) - Sylvia
- Love Hurts (1992) - Jackie Carver

== Theatre ==
She studied at The Questors Theatre in Ealing, West London.
