= Midweek (BBC Radio 4) =

- Genre: Discussion & Talk
- Running time: 45 mins (09.00)
- Country of origin: United Kingdom
- Language: English
- Home station: BBC Radio 4
- Hosted by: Libby Purves
- Original release: 23 November 1978 – 29 March 2017
- Website: Midweek
- Podcast: Podcast

Midweek was a British weekly radio magazine series broadcast on BBC Radio 4. It was aired on Wednesday at 09.00 and repeated the same day at 21.00. For most of its run it was presented by Libby Purves and each week several guests discussed various topics with her. Start the Week and Stop the Week, also broadcast on Radio 4, employed similar formats. The programme ended in March 2017 as part of a schedule change.

== History ==
The first edition, initially billed in the Radio Times as Mid-week (billed as Midweek from October 1981), was broadcast on Thursday 23 November 1978. The programme moved to Wednesday mornings in October 1979. The original presenter was television documentary maker Desmond Wilcox. Other presenters between 1979 and 1983 included Russell Harty, Benny Green, Des Lynam, Elaine Stritch, Valerie Singleton, Ned Sherrin, Mavis Nicholson, Pete Murray, Noel Edmonds, Henry Kelly and Clare Francis.

Purves had originally joined the programme in 1982 to conduct the birthday interview and became the main presenter from January 1984.

In December 2016 it was announced that Midweek would end the following March and be replaced by two new arts programmes. The final edition was broadcast on 29 March 2017.

=== Controversy ===
In 1986, then-producer Victor Lewis-Smith employed cockney comedian Arthur Mullard as stand-in for Purves who was on holiday. The result was a unique hour of broadcasting which polarised the opinion of its listeners. Lewis-Smith later said, "it was intended to break talk show conventions in a humorous way." 25 years later iPM ran a programme profiling what Purves described as "a piece of post-modern neo-dada performance art subverting the entire genre of Radio 4."

On 19 October 2005, a blazing argument between comedian Joan Rivers and broadcaster Darcus Howe, who were both guests on that week's edition, erupted live on air, after Howe suggested Rivers was offended by the use of the term 'black'. Rivers angrily rejected his suggestion, accusing him of implying she was a racist and called him a "son of a bitch". According to a Radio 4 spokeswoman, around twenty people contacted the station, subsequent to the live broadcast, some critical of the swearing, but most "called to say they really enjoyed the debate".
