= Steaming (play) =

1981 play by English playwright Nell Dunn

- Queen's Theatre, Hornchurch revival, 1985
- Written by: Nell Dunn
- Original language: English
- Subject: Five women of all conditions come to bare their bodies, souls and fantasies.
- Genre: Comedy
- Setting: A Russian Steam bath in London in the late 1970s.

Premiere
- Date premiered: 1981
- Place premiered: Theatre Royal, Stratford; London

Steaming is a 1981 play written by English playwright Nell Dunn first staged at Theatre Royal, Stratford East, in London. It won the 1981 Laurence Olivier Award for Best New Comedy (at the time known as the Society of West End Theatre Award for Best New Comedy).

The play opened on Broadway at the Brooks Atkinson Theatre on 12 December 1983, running for 65 performances and ten previews. The cast included Judith Ivey, Pauline Flanagan, Lisa Jane Persky, Linda Thorson, and Margaret Whitton. Reviewing the production in The New York Times, Frank Rich praised Ivey's performance, and wrote "Though in no way an accomplished play, Steaming is still lightly enjoyable when it isn't preaching. The talk is often amusing and seemingly authentic ... The American Steaming contains far more nudity than the London version, but it's handled un-self-consciously and adds verisimilitude where once there was prurient coyness."

During 2010, Jally Entertainment toured Australia with the play, starring Val Lehman (best known for her role in TV serial Prisoner) and Alli Pope.

== Film adaptation ==
The play was adapted for film by Patricia Losey released in 1985. The film was directed by Joseph Losey with Vanessa Redgrave, Sarah Miles, and Diana Dors.
