= Get Loaded in the Park =

Music festival in London, England

- Genre: Rock, indie rock, alternative rock, pop, punk rock
- Dates: One Sunday in June
- Locations: Clapham Common, London UK
- Years active: 2004 – present
- Website: www.getloadedinthepark.com

Get Loaded in the Park is an inner-city music festival held on Clapham Common in London annually since 2004. It was held on the August Bank Holiday Sunday until 2010 when the festival took a years sabbatical, before returning in 2011 with a new date of Sunday 12 June.

In its original format it was held on the August Bank Holiday as the rock/pop based second day in the 'Clapham Weekender' with the electronic/dance based South West Four occurring on the Saturday. Then in 2009, the whole weekend became an all electronic/dance based affair, before 2010 when South West Four took over the Sunday and became a 2-day festival, and continues to be as of 2011. It is held on the same weekend as Creamfields UK and the Reading and Leeds Festivals.

Get Loaded in the Park has also spawned several nightclub events, under the banner of Get Loaded in the Dark.

== List of headliners ==
- 2011: Razorlight
- 2010: No festival
- 2009: Orbital
- 2008: Iggy & The Stooges
- 2007: The Streets
- 2006: Babyshambles
- 2005: Happy Mondays
- 2004: Happy Mondays
