= Athens News =

English-language Greek newspaper

- Type: Weekly newspaper
- Format: Tabloid
- Owner: Myenpi Publishing
- Editor: Ioanna Papadimitropoulou
- Founded: 1952
- Ceased publication: 2012
- Headquarters: Athens, Greece

Athens News was an English-language newspaper published in Greece. The paper had regular sections covering aspects of Greek news such as politics, social issues, business, arts & entertainment and sports, as well as international news. Features included analysis of domestic and foreign affairs by leading academics and experts, humour columns and reader contributions. During the dictatorship, Athens News was a leading voice against the junta, and its publisher Yannis Horn was jailed and threatened by the dictators.

== History ==
Athens News was founded by Yannis Horn, brother of Dimitris Horn, and first appeared on 29 January 1952. It closed down permanently in March 2013, after a long period of economic problems, making it a victim of the Greek crisis.

In 1993, Athens News was redesigned and revamped when it was acquired by the Lambrakis Foundation, a non-profit research centre specialising in education. As such, it formed part of the Lambrakis Press Group.

It was the first Greek newspaper to be published on the internet - an online edition appeared in 1995.

In 2001, after 49 years as a daily, the Athens News became a weekly, appearing on Fridays.

In October 2008, the paper was acquired by Myenpi Publishing.

=== History against the dictatorship ===
The 1973 Chinese edition of Athens News mocking the political situation in Greece during the Papadopoulos dictatorship. The editor changed his Greek name "Yannis Horn" to its pseudo-Chinese version "Ya – nih orn", and it is visible on the page.

In October 1971, Athens News publisher Yannis Horn was arrested and jailed for writing an article against the junta after a visit to Athens by US vice-president Spiro Agnew. The title of the article was "Βόμβες και επιστρατευμένοι μαθητές υποδέχονται τον Άγκνιου" (Bombs and recruited students greet Agnew).

In 1973, Horn published an article under the title "Η πολιτική κατάσταση στην Ελλάδα σήμερα" (The political situation in Greece today). The article was written in Chinese. Horn did not speak Chinese, but he copied a random article from a Chinese newspaper that he had seen that day, and he changed his Greek name "Yannis Horn" to its pseudo-Chinese version "Ya – nih orn". He was arrested for the publication of the article, and was told by a junta official that if he were ever to be caught again [by the junta official] he would be converted to soap. Yannis Horn did not know the meaning of the Chinese text that he put on the front cover of his newspaper, so he went to a Chinese restaurant in Athens and asked the owner to translate it for him. The owner, however, was a Chinese-American and told Horn that he did not understand Chinese. It was later that Horn found out that the text was not from mainland China, but from a nationalist newspaper published in Taiwan.

In April 1973, Athens News, along with Bradini, and Thessaloniki, were the only newspapers in Greece to publish comments by Konstantinos Karamanlis criticising the dictatorship. The editions of all three newspapers were confiscated by the dictators.

== Reception ==
Athens News has been described as "The main English-language newspaper, available in most resorts, is the Athens News, in colour with good features and Balkan news, plus entertainment and arts listings.". It has also been described as a "historic newspaper", and as "having written its own history [in the annals] of the Greek Press".

Rough Guides writes: "The online edition of the Athens News, Greece's longest-running, quality English-language newspaper with the city's top shows."

The book Transitions mentions that "Greece and the Mediterranean English-language newspapers such as The Athens News and The Portugal News may be helpful sources of job vacancies." Athens News is also cited in academic publications and books.

== Journalists and articles ==
Articles and the journalists who wrote them for Athens News include:

- "The real unsung heroes" by Reuters correspondent Nick Michaelian.
- "All was not what it seemed in early junta days" by Australian journalist David Glass.
- "A long, happy summer night 30 years ago" by then The Times correspondent in Athens Mario Modiano.
- "The colonels' coup and the cult of the kitsch" by Diane Shugart.
- "Past present" by senior Greek journalist Dimitris Yannopoulos.
- "The boy who braved the tanks" by Albert Coerant, Belgian and Dutch TV correspondent in Greece during the junta.

== Editors ==
- Yannis Horn (1952–1993)
- Nikiforos Antonopoulos (1993–1994)
- Ramolo Gandolfo (1994–2000)
- John Psaropoulos (2000–2009)
- Ioanna Papadimitropoulou (2009–present)

== Cessation of print and websites ==
Since November 2012, Athens News has ceased operating, both the print edition and the website.

The blog for Athens News was declared defunct on 26 December 2010, but had evidently been defunct since some time in 2009. As of April 2013 the website still existed, but simply displayed a logo for the newspaper (and was apparently otherwise defunct, but not vacant).
