= Michael Standing (actor) =

British actor

- Born: Michael Lionel Standing; 19 June 1939 (age 86); London, England
- Occupation: Actor

Michael Lionel Standing (born 19 June 1939) is a British actor, appearing mostly in the 1960s and early 1970s.

Standing was born in London. Between an appearance in a 1964 episode of the TV series of The Saint and his final appearance in the 1973 opening season of The Tomorrow People in which he played Ginge, the biker heavy who became the Tomorrow People's ally, he appeared in a considerable number of dramas such as Z-Cars, Gideon's Way, Rooms and the soap opera The Newcomers, and episodes of fantasy television series such as Adam Adamant Lives!, The Champions, and Ace of Wands.

Standing played Arthur in the 1969 film, The Italian Job, who was, as Michael Caine's character Croker observed "only supposed to blow the bloody doors off!" after he had destroyed a van with gelignite.

Standing later moved to the United States, and was briefly married to Sherri Spillane, the ex-wife of writer Mickey Spillane.

== Partial filmography ==
- The Violent Enemy (1967) - Fletcher
- Stranger in the House (1967) - Fashion photographer (uncredited)
- Poor Cow (1967) - Young Man in Field
- Up the Junction (1968) - John
- The Italian Job (1969) - Arthur
- Made (1972) - Young man on train
- Aftershock (1990) - Gruber (final film role)
