= Queenie Watts =

British actress (1923–1980)

- Born: Mary Spenton; 21 July 1923; London, England
- Died: 25 January 1980 (aged 56); London, England
- Resting place: East London Cemetery, London, England
- Occupations: Actress, singer, publican
- Spouse: James W. “Slim” Watts (m. 1941)

Queenie Watts (born Mary Spenton; 21 July 1923 – 25 January 1980) was an English actress of film and television, as well as an occasional singer. She was noted for her broad cockney accent.

== Biography ==
Watts was born Mary Spenton in London in 1923. She appeared in many British films, including the Joan Littlewood production Sparrows Can't Sing (1963).

A film directed by Michael Orrom called Portrait of Queenie was released in 1964, in which she sang jazz standards and some original songs. It was released by the BFI. In the film she was accompanied by Stan Tracey's Quintet and Watts featured in scenes set around Poplar, the Isle of Dogs and the Iron Bridge Tavern, Poplar, which she ran in real life and in which she starred in the TV series Stars and Garters (1963).

In 1966 she appeared in the film version of Alfie, singing "Goodbye, Dolly Gray" in a memorable, riotous bar-room brawl sequence, and also appeared as a pub singer in the Tommy Steele film Half a Sixpence in 1967.

Her sole record called Queen High, in which she sang the same songs from Portrait of Queenie, and was accompanied by The Mike McKenzie Group and Stan Tracey's Quintet, was released in 1966 on the UK Columbia label with catalogue number SX 6047.

She also appeared in Ken Loach's Poor Cow (1967); in the film version of Up the Junction (1968); as a pub landlady, in All Coppers Are... (1972); as the ill-fated housekeeper in the horror film Schizo (1976); in many British 1970s sex comedies including Keep It Up, Jack (1973); Intimate Games (1976); Come Play with Me (1977); and Confessions from the David Galaxy Affair (1979). She was often seen in television programmes through the 1960s and 1970s, including the successful, but critically panned, Romany Jones (1972–75), and its sequel Yus, My Dear (1976) in which Arthur Mullard featured as her husband. Watts also appeared with Mullard, playing Lily and Wally Briggs from Romany Jones, in the third On the Buses film spin-off Holiday on the Buses in 1973. She was also a mainstay of the comedy drama series Beryl's Lot, appearing as Beryl's neighbour Freda Mills from 1973 to 1975.

On stage, she played Mary in Edward Bond's play Saved at the Royal Court Theatre in 1969.

Watts appeared in Dad's Army in the role of Mrs Edna Peters, also in several episodes of Dixon of Dock Green in different roles; in two episodes of Callan (appearing as the aunt of petty crook Lonely, played by Russell Hunter); and singular episodes of Steptoe and Son (1972) and George and Mildred (1979). She appeared in three episodes of the Play for Today anthology series for the BBC, including Waterloo Sunset transmitted on 23 January 1979.

She ran pubs (including the Iron Bridge Tavern, East India Dock Road, London and the Rose and Crown, Pennyfields, Poplar) with her husband, "Slim Watts", where she also sang and played piano with an eight-piece band to pull in more customers.

== Death ==
Watts died in London from cancer in 1980, aged 56. She was cremated in the East London Cemetery.

== Filmography ==
=== Film ===
Year	Title	Role	Notes
1963	Sparrows Can't Sing	Queenie	
1966	Alfie	Blonde Pub Singer	Uncredited
1967	Poor Cow	Aunt Emm	
1967	Half a Sixpence	Pub Character	
1968	Up the Junction	Mrs. Hardy	
1969	The Best House in London	Old Crone	Uncredited
1972	All Coppers Are...	Mrs. Malloy	
1973	Holiday on the Buses	Mrs. Briggs	
1974	Keep It Up, Jack	Char Lady	
1976	Intimate Games	John's Mother	
1976	Schizo	Mrs. Wallace	
1977	Come Play with Me	Café Girl	
1979	Confessions from the David Galaxy Affair	David Galaxy's Mother	

=== Television ===
Year	Title	Role	Notes
1967	Beggar My Neighbour	The Bride's Mother	Episode: "For Better, for Worse"
1967	Dixon of Dock Green	Mrs. Farley	Episode: "Six Till Two"
1968	Dixon of Dock Green	Mrs. Gray	Episode: "The Last Look"
1968	Mr. Rose	Mrs. Midgley	Episode: "The Less-Than-Iron-Duke"
1969	Dad's Army	Mrs. Keen	Episode: "Under Fire"
1969	World in Ferment	Various	All 6 episodes
1969	Dad's Army	Mrs. Peters	Episode: "The Armoured Might of Lance Corporal Jones"
1970	Comedy Playhouse	Annie Bundle	Episode: "The Jugg Brothers"
1970	As Good Cooks Go	Evelyn Trent	Episode: "Frying Squad"
1970	Smith	Applewoman	Episode: "Not Nubbed Yet"
1970, 1972	Callan	Lonely's Auntie	2 episodes
1970	Up Pompeii!	Luscia's Maid	Episode: "The Love Potion"
1970	Comedy Playhouse	West	Episode: "Meter Maids"
1970	Dad's Army	Edna	Episode: "The Two and a Half Feathers"
1970	The Goodies	Playgirl Club Compere	Episode: "Caught in the Act"
1970	Play for Today	Connie	Episode: "The Hallelujah Handshake"
1971	Sykes and a Big, Big Show	Various	Episode: "Guest"
1971	Play for Today	Mrs. Brass	Episode: "Everybody Say Cheese"
1971	Never Mind the Quality, Feel the Width	Lily	Episode: "Weavers to Wearers"
1972	Dixon of Dock Green	Market Stallholder	Episode: "First Offenders"
1972–1975	Romany Jones	Lily Briggs	All 27 episodes
1972	Steptoe and Son	Joyce	Episode: "Oh, What a Beautiful Mourning"
1972	Country Matters	Molly Blatts	Episode: "The Sullens Sisters"
1972	Scott On...	Various	Episode: "Culture"
1972	The Hole in the Wall	Mrs. Grimes	6 episodes
1972	Doomwatch	Demonstrator	Episode: "Sex and Violence"
1973	Play of the Month	Signora Bertolini	Episode: "A Room with a View"
1973	A Pin to See the Peepshow	Mrs. Humble	Episode: #1.3
1973	Armchair 30	Mrs. Fenton	Episode: "Simon Fenton's Story"
1973–1975	Beryl's Lot	Freda Mills	14 episodes
1974	Dixon of Dock Green	Mrs. Cross	Episode: "Knocker"
1974	Marked Personal	Doris	2 episodes
1974	Sykes	Ada	Episode: "The Pub"
1976	Dixon of Dock Green	Mrs. Hooker	Episode: "Everybody's Business"
1976	Yus My Dear	Lily Briggs	All 19 episodes
1979	The Dick Emery Show	Hilda's Mother	Episode: #16.3
1979	Play for Today	Grace Dwyer	Episode: "Waterloo Sunset"
1979	George and Mildred	Gladys	Episode: "The Last Straw"
1980	Play for Today	Lilian	Episode: "Murder Rap"
