= I'll Never Forget What's'isname =

1967 British film by Michael Winner

I'll Never Forget What's 'Isname
- Theatrical release poster
- Directed by: Michael Winner
- Written by: Peter Draper
- Produced by: Michael Winner
- Starring: Orson Welles; Oliver Reed; Carol White; Harry Andrews; Michael Hordern; Lyn Ashley; Frank Finlay
- Cinematography: Otto Heller
- Edited by: Bernard Gribble
- Music by: Francis Lai
- Production companies: Universal Pictures; Scimitar Films
- Distributed by: Rank Film Distributors
- Release dates: 18 December 1967 (London); 18 April 1968 (NYC)
- Running time: 99 minutes
- Country: United Kingdom
- Language: English

I'll Never Forget What's 'Isname, also known as The Takers, is a 1967 British comedy-drama film directed and produced by Michael Winner. It stars Oliver Reed and Orson Welles. It was written by Peter Draper. The film deals with creativity and commercialism.

== Plot ==
The opening credits run as a man carries a large axe through the streets of London. He then enters an office and destroys a desk with the axe. The man, Andrew Quint, works for Dallafield Advertising alongside Lute. Quint has a string of affairs with younger women despite being married. He begins to recall his torturous school days, and these memories entwine with the present.

Quint attempts to get back at his boss, Jonathan Lute, by making a negative commercial reusing themes from earlier in the film, including Lute saying, "The number one product of all human endeavor is waste... waste." The commercial, advertising a Super-8 camera, talks about capturing events while you still can before everything is destroyed and discarded. It ends with Quint operating a car crusher and destroying numerous cameras. The commercial is hailed as a masterpiece and wins an award, but Quint hurls the award into the River Thames and escapes into Swinging London.

== Cast ==
- Orson Welles as Jonathan Lute
- Oliver Reed as Andrew Quint
- Carol White as Georgina Elben
- Harry Andrews as Gerald Sater, Quint's old teacher
- Michael Hordern as headmaster
- Wendy Craig as Louise Quint
- Norman Rodway as Nicholas
- Marianne Faithfull as Josie
- Frank Finlay as school chaplain
- Ann Lynn as Carla
- Harvey Hall as Charles Maccabee
- Lyn Ashley as Susannah
- Edward Fox as Walter
- Mark Burns as Michael Cornwall
- Mark Eden as Kelloway
- Stuart Cooper as Lewis Force
- Roland Curram as Eldrich
- Peter Graves as Bankman
- Bessie Love as American tourist (uncredited)
- Anthony Sharp as Mr. Hamper Down (uncredited)
- Julian Holloway as young man in disco (uncredited)
- Nicky Henson as young man in disco (uncredited)

== Soundtrack ==
The soundtrack by Francis Lai was released on LP by Decca Records (Decca DL 79163).

== Critical reception ==
The film received mixed reviews, with critics praising individual performances while questioning its overall coherence and thematic focus.

Several reviewers appreciated the film's ambitious scope and star performances. Richard Schickel wrote positively in Life magazine: "The people responsible for this movie have taken a big chance, deliberately blowing their cool in the hope that they can overpower ours. For me, the gamble worked." Leonard Maltin's 2008 Movie Guide described the film as an "excellent comedy drama".

However, many critics found the film's execution lacking despite its potential. The Monthly Film Bulletin offered a mixed assessment, noting that while "this tragi-comedy is bursting with brightness and ideas," these elements were "on the whole too confused to add up to very much." The review particularly praised Orson Welles' performance as the advertising tycoon and Otto Heller's Technicolor photography, suggesting the film had "a distinction that probably goes beyond its deserts."

Other critics were more dismissive of the film's 1960s sensibilities. Leslie Halliwell described it as a "vivid yet muddled tragi-comedy of the sixties, with splashes of sex and violence in trendy settings, a hero one really doesn't believe in, and a title which seems to have no meaning whatsoever." VideoHound's Golden Movie Retriever (2007) suggested that "to some tastes, this overwrought and long-unseen comedy from the swinging '60s will be completely dated with characters whose mindsets are totally alien."

A contemporaneous review in The Kentucky Kernel summarized the film's central problem, writing that it "came off as a pessimistic reiteration of the existing war between traditions and society, and individuality and the arts. It sparked here and there and was just about to catch fire when something would inevitably happen to drag it back into the groove it had started for itself."

== Controversy ==
In the United States, the film was denied a MPAA seal of approval due to a scene between Oliver Reed and Carol White which supposedly implied cunnilingus. Winner, in his audio commentary, said he considered the scene to show masturbation. The Catholic League inaccurately described it as "fellatio". Universal distributed the film through Regional Film Distributors, a subsidiary that was not a member of the MPAA. Along with a similar scene in Charlie Bubbles (1967), this helped to bring about the end of the Production Code in the U.S. and its replacement with a ratings system.

The film has been incorrectly named as the first mainstream film to propose the use of "fuck" in dialogue. In fact, the BBFC certified the film after demanding the removal, or at least obscuring, of the word fucking (via the sound of a car horn) in June 1967, three months later than Ulysses (1967), which suffered heavier cuts. The error seems to have arisen because of a longstanding lack of easily obtainable film release date information.
