= Colourscape =

- Artists: Peter Jones and Lynne Dickens
- Year: 1970–present
- Type: Installation art, Kinetic art, Pneumatic structure
- Medium: Polyvinyl chloride (PVC), air, natural light
- Dimensions: Variable (up to 100 chambers)
- Owner: Eye Music Trust / Cwmni Colourscape
- Website: www.eyemusic.org.uk/colourscape/colourscape_info.html

Colourscape is a series of large-scale, immersive kinetic art sculptures and performance environments originally created by the British artist and mathematician Peter Jones (1939–2023) in the early 1970s.

Rooted in the Constructivist and Light and Space movements of the 1960s, the work explores the phenomenology of color and spatial perception through the use of translucent PVC membranes inflated by air. Early iterations of the concept, developed in collaboration with Maurice Agis under the name Spaceplace, were exhibited at the Museum of Modern Art Oxford and the Stedelijk Museum Amsterdam, and were awarded the Sikkens Prize in 1967.

== History ==
=== Origins and Spaceplace (1960s) ===
Peter Jones studied at Saint Martin's School of Art in London in the early 1960s, where he was influenced by the De Stijl movement's rigorous approach to abstraction and geometry. In 1963, Jones established the "Space Structure Workshop" in the Woolwich dockyard to experiment with three-dimensional color grids.

Collaborating with fellow artist Maurice Agis, Jones developed Spaceplace, a precursor to Colourscape that used colored panels and rods to create architectural interventions. In 1966, Spaceplace became the first self-generated exhibition held at the newly founded Museum of Modern Art Oxford (MOMA Oxford).

The duo's work was recognized internationally in 1967 when they were awarded the Sikkens Prize in the Netherlands, a prize previously awarded to Le Corbusier and Gerrit Rietveld. The jury cited their work for its "conception of spatial structures... determining spatial orientation [and] inspiring human movement." By 1972, the project had evolved significantly, with Jones and Agis publishing their manifesto on "Spaceplace" in Studio International.

=== Evolution into Colourscape (1970s–Present) ===
Seeking to move art out of the gallery and into the public sphere, Jones began experimenting with pneumatic (air-supported) structures in the early 1970s. He realized that daylight transmitted through colored PVC created a more intense saturation than reflected light (paint).

- 1971: The first pneumatic structure, titled Spaceplace, Towards a Colour Village, toured the UK, including an installation outside the Serpentine Gallery.
- 1974: The project was formally renamed Colourscape.
- 1978: Jones formed a creative partnership with artist Lynne Dickens (later Cwmni Colourscape), who significantly expanded the scale and complexity of the structures.
- 1989: The Eye Music Trust was established to commission musicians and composers to create site-specific works for the structures, turning them into performance venues.

== Artistic theory and design ==
=== Phenomenology and perception ===
Unlike traditional sculpture which is viewed from the outside, Colourscape is a Ganzfeld environment designed to be experienced from within. Jones, who was also a mathematician, applied topological principles to the layout of the chambers. The structures are designed to disorient the viewer and alter visual perception through specific color sequencing.

By moving participants from a chamber of intense red (long wavelength) to a chamber of blue or green, the artwork exploits the phenomenon of retinal fatigue, causing visitors to perceive colors that are not physically present in the material.

=== Engineering ===
The structures are fabricated from custom-welded PVC. Jones and Dickens developed specialized seam-welding techniques to create "soft geometry"—structures that maintain structural integrity solely through air pressure without rigid supports. The largest structures, such as Festival One (commissioned 1994), consist of nearly 100 interlinked chambers and cover approximately one acre.

== Reception and legacy ==
While frequently exhibited at festivals and public cultural events, Colourscape has connections to the radical architecture of the late 1960s and early 1970s, sharing features with the work of groups such as Ant Farm and Haus-Rucker-Co, which used inflatable forms to challenge conventional permanent architecture.

Peter Jones, who conceived Colourscape, died in 2023. Colourscape continues to be presented by the Eye Music Trust at events in the United Kingdom and abroad.

== Notable works ==
- Spaceplace (1966–1967) – Rigid panel installation (Oxford/Amsterdam).
- Colourscape I (1974) – First pneumatic version.
- Festival One (1995) – Large-scale performance venue.
- Moonorooni – A structure designed specifically for sensory education and special needs accessibility.

== See also ==
- Light and Space
- Environmental art
- James Turrell
- Otto Piene
- Inflatable architecture
