= Up the Junction (The Wednesday Play) =

- The Wednesday Play episode
- Opening title
- Episode no.: Season 3 Episode 4
- Directed by: Ken Loach
- Written by: Nell Dunn
- Original air date: 3 November 1965

"Up the Junction" is an episode of the BBC anthology drama series The Wednesday Play directed by Ken Loach and produced by James MacTaggart. It was first broadcast on 3 November 1965 on BBC1. The play was adapted by Nell Dunn and (uncredited) Ken Loach from Dunn's short story collection of the same name. It tells the stories of three young women living in North Battersea and Clapham and, to a lesser degree, their boyfriends.

== Plot ==
Three young female factory workers, Rube, Sylvie and Eileen, go out to a pub where they meet three young men, Terry, Ron and Dave. They flirt, go on a date to a lido and pair off, each couple developing a significant relationship.

Terry and Rube soon have sex at Rube's flat while her mother is out. Rube becomes pregnant and must seek an illegal back-street abortion, which is botched, causing Rube to suffer a miscarriage. Although Terry and Rube continue their relationship after the abortion, they begin to grow apart, and finally have a row. Terry speeds off on his motorcycle, crashes it, and dies.

Sylvie marries Ron, but soon marital troubles develop, culminating in the couple having an ugly public row in the street outside a pub that Sylvie visited with Rube and Eileen.

Dave is already married when he meets Eileen, but he is unhappy with his wife, and he and Eileen have a romantic affair. In addition to his job, Dave also has a criminal history of theft. He is finally caught and imprisoned. Eileen remains loyal to him.

== Cast ==
- Carol White – Sylvie
- Geraldine Sherman – Rube
- Vickery Turner – Eileen
- Tony Selby – Dave
- Michael Standing – Terry
- Ray Barron – Ron
- Rita Webb – Mrs. Hardy
- Hilda Barry – Old May
- Jessie Robins – Fat Lil
- George Sewell – Barny, the Tallyman
- Ann Lancaster – Winnie, the abortionist

== Production ==
The filmed play has an episodic structure. As story editor Tony Garnett's biographer Stephen Lacey has written, the play "is less concerned with its narrative high-points ... and is motivated more by the seemingly haphazard interplay of accident and incident".

The play included documentary elements, such as an interview with a doctor advocating a change in the law to prevent 35 deaths each year from back-street abortions. The inclusion of documentary material caused confusion among some viewers who were unsure whether they were watching a fictional play or the continuation of a news broadcast that had aired just before The Wednesday Play.

== Reception ==
Audience research found that the programme was viewed by about 10 million people. The BBC received 400 complaints about the broadcast, mostly about its bad language and depiction of abortion. Christian morality campaigner Mary Whitehouse, responding to Up the Junction, wrote in her book Cleaning-up TV (1967):

The sooner these terrible back-street abortionists are put out of business the better! True. But what about a play which would make it clear that any kind of abortion, legal or otherwise, has dangers to mental and bodily health far greater than natural childbirth. How about a programme which demonstrates that clean living could cut out a great deal of this problem at the root?

Some commentators objected to the merging of documentary elements with drama at the time of the play's transmission, but Loach rejected the criticism, stating that "we were very anxious for our plays not to be considered dramas but as continuations of the news." Loach went on to use the same technique of including documentary elements in the 1966 television play Cathy Come Home.

The antagonism to the play included the upper echelons of the BBC itself. A proposal to repeat the play was rejected by the governors in the summer of 1966 who noted the "great offence" the piece had caused at its first screening. Trade unionist Dame Anne Godwin, a BBC governor who had herself not seen the play, was minuted at a meeting in June 1966 as complaining of "too great a tendency ... to concentrate on the 'sick' elements in society as sources from which to illustrate contemporary problems."

The play contributed to the debate leading up to the Abortion Act 1967, which legalised the termination of a pregnancy in the UK. Tony Garnett, whose work on the project was more extensive than his formal brief as story editor, commented in 2013 about the "very, very personal" nature of this play. When Garnett was a child, his mother had died following a back-street abortion, and his father died by suicide less than a month later.

A film version based on Dunn's original short stories was released in 1968. In 2011, the television play was included in the 6 DVD box set, Ken Loach at the BBC.
