= Nell Dunn =

UK playwright & fiction writer

Nell Dunn FRSL
- Born: Nell Mary Dunn; 9 June 1936 (age 90); London, England
- Occupations: Playwright; novelist; screenwriter
- Spouse: Jeremy Sandford (m. 1957; div. 1979)
- Children: 3
- Parent: Philip Gordon Dunn, 2nd Baronet Dunn (father)
- Relatives: Serena Rothschild (sister); James Hamet Dunn (paternal grandfather); James St Clair-Erskine, 5th Earl of Rosslyn (maternal grandfather)
- Writing career
- Notable work: Up the Junction (1963) Steaming (1981)

Nell Mary Dunn (born 9 June 1936) is an English playwright, screenwriter and author. She is known especially for a volume of short stories, Up the Junction, and a novel, Poor Cow.

== Early years ==
Dunn was born in London the second daughter of Baronet Sir Philip Dunn, the son of Baronet James Hamet Dunn; she is the maternal granddaughter of the 5th Earl of Rosslyn. She was educated at a convent up to the age of 14. She and her older sister Serena were evacuated to America during the Second World War. Her parents divorced in 1944.

Her father did not believe his daughters needed qualifications. As a result, she has never passed an exam in her life. She learnt to read only at nine years old. Dunn said, "Whenever my father saw my appalling spelling, he would laugh. But it wasn't an unkind laugh. In his laugh there was the message, 'You are a completely original person, and everything you do has your own mark on it.' He wanted us all to be unique."

Despite her upper-class background, Dunn moved in 1959 to Battersea, made friends there and worked for a time in a confectionery factory. This milieu inspired much of what Dunn would later write. She attended the Courtauld Institute of Art.

== Career ==
After her marriage to Jeremy Sandford in 1957, they gave up their smart Chelsea home and went to live in unfashionable Battersea where they joined and observed the lower strata of society. From this experience he published the play Cathy Come Home in 1963, and she wrote Up the Junction.

Dunn came to notice with the publication of Up the Junction (1963), a series of short stories set in South London, some of which had already appeared in the New Statesman. The book, awarded the John Llewellyn Rhys Prize, was a controversial success at the time for its vibrant, realistic and non-judgemental portrait of its working-class protagonists. It was adapted for television by Dunn, with Ken Loach, for The Wednesday Play series, directed by Loach and broadcast in November 1965. A cinema film version was released in 1968.

Talking to Women (1965) was a collection of interviews with nine friends, "from society heiresses to factory workers (Dunn herself was both)". The interviewees included Edna O’Brien, Pauline Boty, Ann Quin and Paddy Kitchen. Dunn's first novel, Poor Cow (1967) was made into a film in the same year, starring Carol White and Terence Stamp, under Loach's direction.

Her later books are Grandmothers (1991) and My Silver Shoes (1996). Dunn's first play Steaming was produced in 1981 and a television film Every Breath You Take in 1987. She also wrote Sisters, a film script commissioned by the BBC.

She won the 1982 Susan Smith Blackburn Prize for her play Steaming. She was elected a fellow of the Royal Society of Literature in 2004.

== Personal life ==
Dunn was married to writer Jeremy Sandford from 1957 to 1979, and they had three sons. For some time the family lived on a small hill farm called Wern Watkin, outside Crickhowell in South Wales. Their farm is mentioned in a 2000 biography by their neighbour, the young Carlo Gébler, son of novelist Edna O'Brien.

She became a patron of Dignity in Dying after her partner, Dan Oestreicher, died of lung cancer.

== Works ==
- Up the Junction 1963
- Poor Cow 1967
- I Want (with Adrian Henri) 1972
- Tear His Head Off His Shoulders 1974
- The Only Child 1978
- Grandmothers 1991
- My Silver Shoes 1996
- The Muse 2020

=== Plays ===
- Steaming, 1981
- Variety Night, 1982
- The Little Heroine, 1988
- Consequences, 1988
- Babe XXX, 1998
- Cancer Tales, 2003
- Home Death 2011

=== Film scripts ===
- Poor Cow (co-written with Ken Loach)
- Every Breath You Take 1987
- Sisters, 1994
