= Up the Junction =

Short stories about slums in London

- First edition
- Author: Nell Dunn
- Illustrator: Susan Benson
- Language: English
- Publisher: MacGibbon & Kee
- Publication date: 1963
- Publication place: UK
- Media type: Print (Hardcover and Paperback)
- Pages: 110 pp (Hardcover edition) & 112 pp (paperback edition)
- OCLC: 17230966

Up the Junction is a 1963 collection of short stories by Nell Dunn that depicts contemporary life in the industrial slums of Battersea and Clapham Junction.

The book won the 1963 John Llewellyn Rhys Memorial Prize.

== Adaptations ==
In 1965 it was adapted for television by the BBC as part of The Wednesday Play anthology series directed by Ken Loach.

A cinema film version followed in 1968 with a soundtrack by Manfred Mann.

These adaptations inspired the 1979 Squeeze hit "Up the Junction".
