= Eye, Moreton and Ashton =

Civil parish in Herefordshire, England

Coordinates: 52.271794°N 2.7388138°W

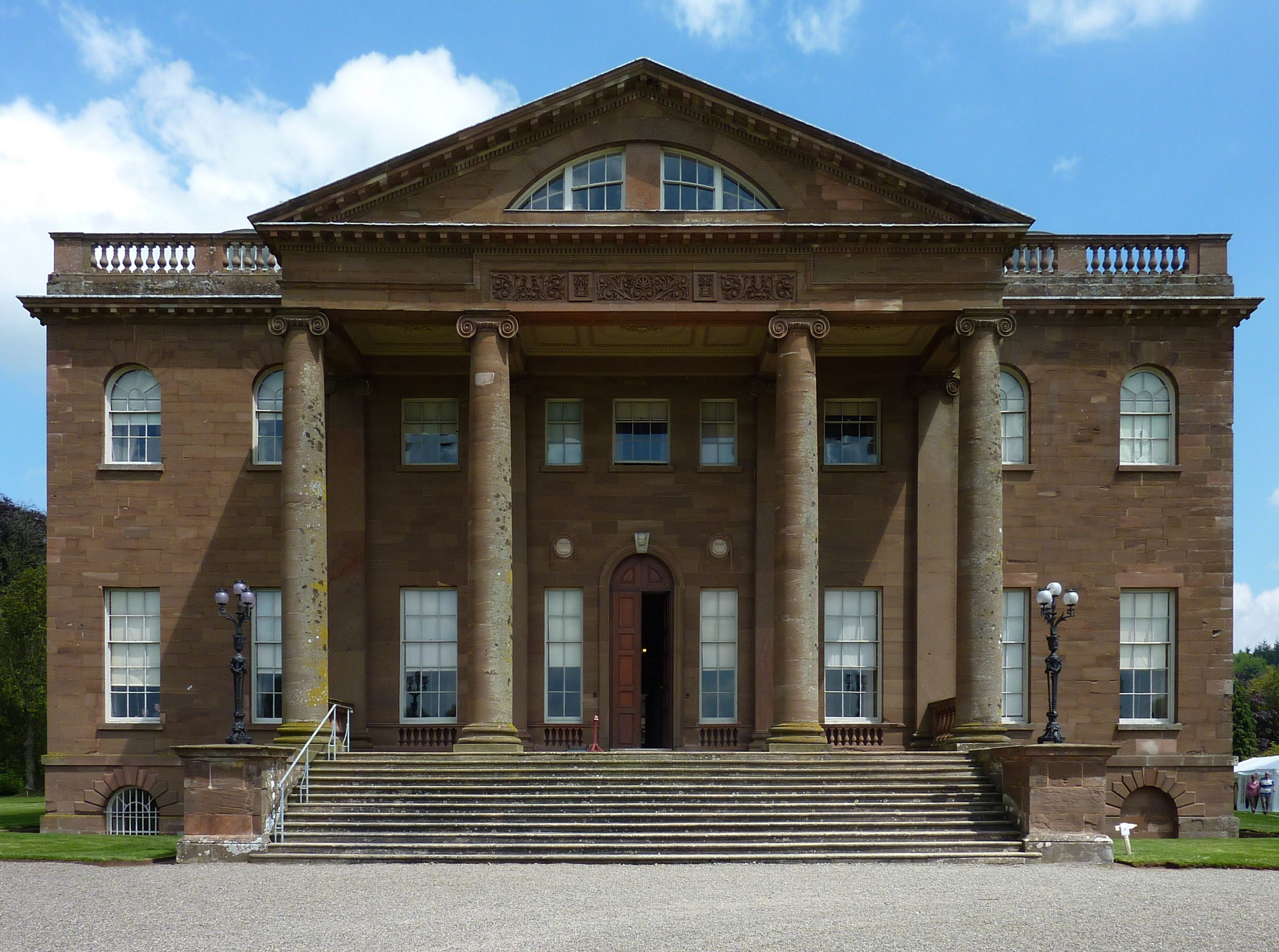
- Berrington Hall

- Location within Herefordshire
- Population: 178 (2011 census)
- OS grid reference: SO496639
  - London: 125 mi (201 km) SE
- Civil parish: Eye, Moreton and Ashton
- Unitary authority: Herefordshire
- Ceremonial county: Herefordshire
- Region: West Midlands
- Country: England
- Sovereign state: United Kingdom
- Post town: Leominster
- Postcode district: HR6
- Dialling code: 01568
- Police: West Mercia
- Fire: Hereford and Worcester
- Ambulance: West Midlands
- UK Parliament: North Herefordshire

Eye, Moreton and Ashton is a civil parish in the county of Herefordshire, England. The parish is 15 miles (24 km) north from the city and county town of Hereford. The closest large town is the market town of Leominster, 3 miles (5 km) to the south. Within the parish is the National Trust property of Berrington Hall, and the villages of Eye, Moreton, and Ashton.

== History ==
=== Medieval to 18th century ===
Eye is from the Old English 'ēg' or 'īeg', for the place at "the island or well-watered land, or dry ground in the marsh". At c.1175 Eye was written as 'Eia'. Moreton is from the Old English 'mōr' with 'tūn' for "farmstead in moorland or marshy ground". Ashton is from the Old English from 'æsc' with 'tūn' for "farmstead where ash trees grow", and written as 'Estune' in the Domesday Book.

Ashton, the only one of the three parish settlements listed in the Domesday Book, was in the Hundred of Leominster and the county of Herefordshire, and was under a number of manors estimated at 20.9 households, with 224 villagers, 81 smallholders, 13 slaves, 12 female slaves, six priests, and a further 20 occupants. Ploughlands comprised 29 lord's and 201 men's plough teams. Manorial assets included 60 further lord's lands, woodland of 6.3 leagues and eight mills. In 1066 Queen Edith held the manorial lordship, which in 1086 was transferred to tenant-in-chief and king William I.

A 12th-century priory of canons at Eye had been originally founded at Shobdon in 1140 by Oliver de Merlylond, steward to Hugh de Mortimer. The manor of Eye during the 13th-century reign of Henry III was owned by the Abbot of Reading, under whom Walter de Eye was lord of the manor. It remained in the De Eye family until the 15th-century reign of Henry VI, when it passed by marriage to John Blount. After being in the Blount family for five or six generation, Walter Blount mortgaged the manor, which was later sold to a servant of Baron Coventry, the Lord Keeper of the Great Seal. The manor was eventually sold to Sir Ferdinando Gorges, who was entrusted by Queen Elizabeth with the custody of Mary, Queen of Scots, and deputed to observe the Earl of Essex. Eye remained in the Gorges' family until the end of the 18th century, during which, between 1754 and 1761 Richard Gorges became MP for Leominster. The manor was sold in 1787 by Richard Gorges' son to Thomas Harley, son to the 3rd Earl of Oxford, who also bought the Berrington estate in 1775.

=== 19th to 21st century ===
In the 19th century the joint township of Eye with Luston was listed under the parish of Eye, with Moreton-cum-Ashton as a further united township within the parish; later Moreton and Ashton with Eye became a joint township and a civil parish. The parish lay between two Ludlow to Leominster turnpike roads. The Shrewsbury and Hereford Railway ran through the parish, its station at the west from Eye village. The route of the 18th-century Stourport and Leominster Canal passed through the parish, and flowed through Moreton-cum-Ashton and along the western edge of the Berrington Hall estate. The canal route had been surveyed by Thomas Dadford Jr. in 1789, was built for an estimated £83,000, and was operating by 1793. Of the three canal tunnels was one at Putnall Hill, at the north-west of the parish on today's Tunnel Lane. The canal closed in 1848 after it was sold to the Shrewsbury and Herefordshire Railway Company for £12,000. Ludlow was the post town for Eye, Leominster that for Luston. In 1858 the village of Eye was described as comprising the church, vicarage, and farm and the railway station. The same year Ashton comprised two "respectable" farm houses, a blacksmith's and wheelwright's shop, dispersed cottages, and "the mound of Castle Tump" camp to the north. Moreton consisted of a farm house, a school building which included girls' classes in sewing and knitting and which was built by Lady Rodney in 1855, and "several" cottages. Occupations and residencies in Eye parish in 1858 included eleven farmers. At the Berrington Hall estate lived Lord Rodney, and his gamekeeper and head gamekeeper, and his farm bailiff. At Eye village was the station master. At Moreton was a shoemaker, the mistress of a free school, and the master of the free school who was also the parish clerk and collector of taxes. At Ashton was a blacksmith & agricultural implement maker

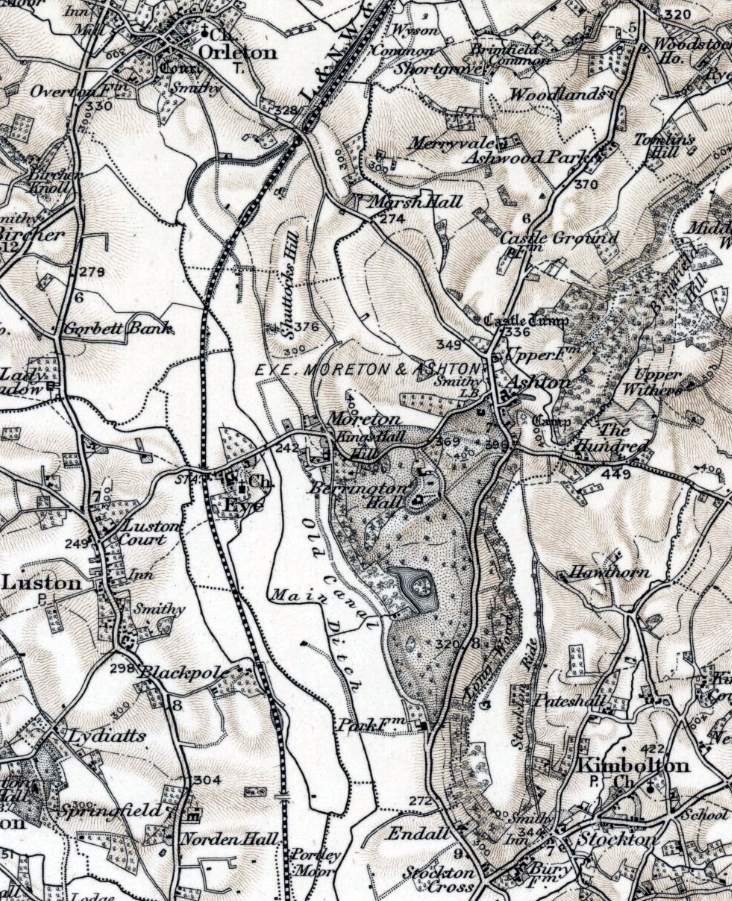
Eye, Moreton and Ashton in 1899

The parish church, Ss Peter and Paul, in Eye village, was described as "a plain building of stone in the gothic style", and included a tower with six bells and a clock, a Rodney chapel divided from the chancel by carved oak screens, and two altar tombs "believed to belong to the Cornewall family", one with the recumbent effigy of a knight, the other with effigies of a knight and his lady. Recorded memorials in the church included a stained glass window to Sarah (died 1 October 1882), the wife to the 6th Baron Rodney, and a wall memorial to Thomas Harley (1730 – 1804), Lord Mayor of London and MP. Fixtures and fittings include a Jacobean pulpit, a Norman font, and an 1887 organ. The church was restored in 1874 by William Chick of Hereford for £3,000. The ecclesiastical parish living was a vicarage, an office supported by tithes and glebe, with vicarage house and glebe—an area of land used to support a parish priest—in the gift of the Lord Chancellor, and in rural deanery of Leominster and the archdeaconry and Diocese of Hereford. The vicarage house was the former manor house built in 1680 by Ferdinando Gorges, the grandson of Ferdinando Gorges. The parish register dates to 1573.

At Eye village the parish room, "an iron building", was recorded next to the railway station, and a Moravian Mission was in existence. At Luston was a Wesleyan chapel which was built in 1862. Berrington Hall in 1868 was the seat of George Bridges Harley Dennett Rodney, 7th Baron Rodney, and in 1909, that of Frederick Cawley, 1st Baron Cawley, and was described as "a mansion of stone beautifully situated in a well-wooded park of 400 acres". In 1909, in Nordan (hamlet) at the south of the Luston part of Eye parish, is recorded Nordan Hall, a "mansion of brick, pleasantly situated on the summit of the hill... with a fine prospect over the vale of Leominster", the residence of Major (later Lt-Colonel) James Gurwood King-King DSO, a veteran of the North-West Frontier and Boer War. In 1868 the parish children's school was at Eye village; by 1909 the parish school was a Public Elementary School at Moreton, which had been built in 1906 to accommodate 140 children, and at the time attended by 88. At The Broad, a hamlet at the extreme south of the Luston part of the parish, was the parish post office.

The parish' principal landowners were Sir Frederick Cawley, William Kevill-Davies of Croft Castle, and James Gurwood King-King. Lords of the manors were Sir Frederick Cawley at Eye and William Kevill-Davies at Luston. Population in Eye in 1851 was 309, and in 1891 was 315 in Eye and 694 in Luston. Population in 1901 was 315 in the Eye, Moreton and Ashton township, 369 in Luston, and 684 in the ecclesiastical parish. Parish area in 1851 was 419 acres (170 hectares), and in 1894 was 2,736 acres (1,107 hectares) and that of the Luston part being 4,536 acres (1,836 hectares). Eye, Moreton and Ashton township area in 1909 was 2,791 acres (1,129 hectares) of land and 17 acres (7 ha) of water, and at Luston, 1,800 acres (730 hectares). The land was clayey over a subsoil of part gravel and part peat, on which the chief crops grown were wheat, beans, hops and apples. Much land at Luston land was given to hop-grounds and orchards, and there existed a sandstone quarry which supplied stone for local building.

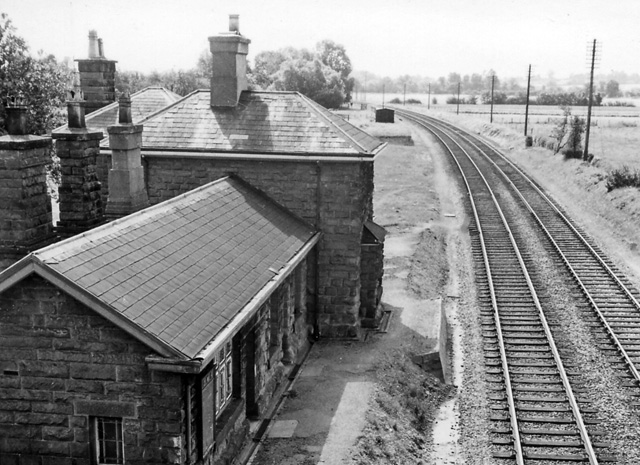
Berrington and Eye station in 1963

In Eye parish in 1909, residents included Sir Frederick Cawley, who was also a member of the Reform and National Liberal clubs in London, and the parish vicar. Commercial trades and occupations in the parish included seven farmers, one of whom was also a hop grower, the farm bailiff and the gardener to Sir Frederick Cawley, a cowkeeper, a blacksmith, a coal merchant and a coal & lime merchant at the railway station, a shopkeeper, a carpenter, a house painter, and a boot & shoe maker who was also a carrier (transporter of trade goods, with sometimes people, between different settlements). Resident at Luston was Major James Gurwood King-King, while trades and occupations included one cottage farmer and eight farmers one of whom was also a hop grower, and an assistant overseer of the poor. There were two market gardeners of the same family, six cow keepers, two castrators of the same family, a carpenter & wheelwright, a blacksmith, a dressmaker, a shoemaker, a timber merchant who ran a sawmill, a shopkeeper & postmistress, a monthly nurse, the licensee of The Balance Inn, and the sanitary inspector to Leominster Rural District Council. At The Broad was a farmer and two jobbing gardeners.

In 2019, three metal detectorists and a coin dealer were convicted at Worcester Crown Court of "theft, conspiracy to conceal criminal property and conspiracy to convert criminal property" of an estimated worth of £3m, relating to a hoard discovered at Eye. The treasure trove was possibly from the 878-79 Great Viking Army. It included a "ninth century gold ring, a dragon's head bracelet, a silver ingot, a crystal rock pendant dating to the fifth century and up to 300 coins, some dating to the reign of King Alfred", with some coins valued at £50,000 each. At the time of the court case and the police investigation, described as of "national significance", only about 10% of the coins had been recovered.

== Geography ==
Eye, Moreton and Ashton is approximately 3.5 miles (6 km) from north to south and 1.5 miles (2 km) east to west, with an area of 5 square miles (12.9 km^{2}), and is approximately 11 miles (18 km) east from the England border with Wales, with the north border of the parish 1 mile (2 km) south from the border of Shropshire. Adjacent parishes are Luston at the west, Croft and Yarpole and Orleton at the north-west, Brimfield at the north, Kimbolton at the south and, with Middleton on the Hill, at the east. The parish is rural, of farms, arable and pasture fields, managed woodland and coppices, watercourses, isolated and dispersed businesses, residential properties, and the nucleated settlements of Eye at the west, Morton at the centre and Ashton at the east, laterally across the centre of the parish. South from the three settlements is the house, parkland, woodland and gardens of the National Trust property of Berrington Hall which extends over virtually the whole south-east part of the parish. The parish is in the catchment area of the River Lugg. The parish boundary with Luston is defined by the Ridgemoor Brook, a tributary of the River Lugg which it joins at Leominster. The north-to-south artificial watercourse of the Main Ditch, which is fed from the parishes of Orleton, and Croft and Yarpole, runs parallel to the east of Ridgemoor Brook and the west of Berrington Hall park where it is linked to the parkland lake of Berrington Pool. The Main Ditch joins Ridgemoor Brook at the south-west of Kimbolton.

The major route of the A49 road, locally from Ludlow at the north to Leominster at the south, runs north to south through the east of the parish. A minor road, Eye Lane, runs west from a junction with the A49 at Ashton, across the parish and through Moreton to Eye, and then on to the village of Luston. The only other parish through road is the minor Tunnel Lane, which runs from Ashton north-west to the village of Orleton beyond the parish. All other routes are bridleways, public footpaths, farm roads and tracks, cul-de-sacs and residential access roads. Running north to south at the very west of the parish is the Welsh Marches railway line, which is intersected by a Berrington Park to Luston public footpath unmanned crossing 600 yards (549 m) south from Berrington and Eye railway station on Eye Lane.

== Governance ==
Eye, Moreton and Ashton is represented in the lowest tier of UK governance by three members on the 10-member Luston Group Parishes council. As Herefordshire is a unitary authority—no district council between parish and county councils—the parish is represented as part of the Bircher Ward on Herefordshire County Council. The parish is represented in the UK Parliament as part of the North Herefordshire constituency.

In 1974 Croft and Yarpole became part of the now defunct Leominster District of the county of Hereford and Worcester, instituted under the Local Government Act 1972. In 2002 the parish, with the parishes of Brimfield, Moreton and Ashton, Eyton, Kimbolton, Laysters, Little Hereford, Luston and Middleton on the Hill, was reassessed as part of Upton Ward which elected one councillor to Herefordshire district council.

== Community ==
Parish population in 2001 was 188, and in 2011, 178.

The parish is served by stops for two bus routes, these on the A49 road at Ashton, and at Moreton and Eye, providing part circuitous village connections between Leominster and Wigmore and Leominster and Mortimer's Cross in Aymestrey. The closest rail connection is at Leominster railway station, 3 miles (5 km) to the south-east, and on the Crewe to Newport Welsh Marches Line.

The closest hospital is Leominster Community Hospital at Leominster, with the closest major hospital Hereford County Hospital at Hereford. The closest schools are Luston Primary School to the west at Luston, Kimbolton St James C of E Primary School to the east at Kimbolton, and Earl Mortimer College & Sixth Form Centre secondary school, and the maintained special school of Westfield School to the south at Leominster.

The Anglican parish church at Eye is St Peter & St Paul which is served by the Leominster Team Ministry in the Deanery of Leominster and the Diocese of Hereford. The closest community centre is Cawley Hall in Luston, just outside Eye village and the parish boundary. At Moreton is a centre for conductive education, at Ashton are holiday cottages and a catering company, on an A49 lay-by a cafe in a double-decker bus, and at the north-east, a base for an online clothing and equipment supplier for horse riding.

== Landmarks ==
Within Eye, Moreton and Ashton are three Grade I and eight Grade II listed buildings, some repeated as part of fourteen scheduled monuments.

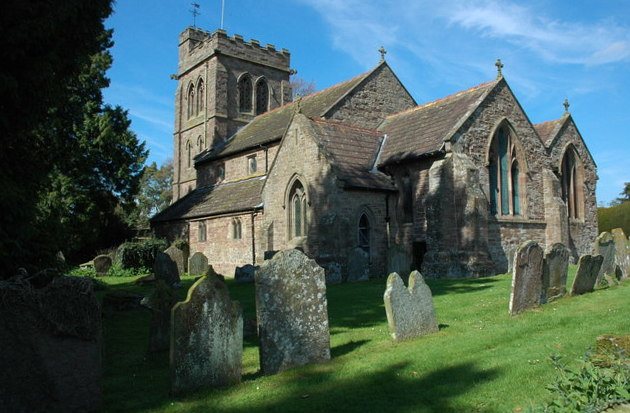
Church of St Peter and St Paul

The Grade I Listed building of St Peter and St Paul dates to the late 12th century with 14th-century changes, and an 1874 restoration by William Chick of Hereford. It comprises a chancel, nave, north chapel to the chancel, north and south aisles, a north porch, a south vestry attached to the chancel, and a rebuilt west tower. The interior has nave north and south arcades of three bays, a chancel north arcade of two bays, and a 13th-century chancel arch. Fixtures and fittings include a late 13th- or early 14th-century font, and a pulpit. There are piscinas in the chancel and north chapel. Against the chancel north chapel north wall are two chest tomb monuments with recumbent effigies, one at the west dated c.1520 to Sir Rowland Cornewall, the other at the east c.1540 to Sir Richard Cornwall and his wife with sculpted figures of their sons and daughters as weepers. Above the tombs is a wall tablet, designed by Sir Reginald Blomfield, which commemorates the three sons of Lord Cawley who died in the First world War. A further church memorial to both World Wars commemorates twenty-two parishioners who died in the First, and three in the Second.

The second Grade I listing includes Berrington Hall and its laundry, dairy and stable outbuildings surrounding the north-east courtyard. The hall is a neoclassical English country house dating to 1778 - 1781, designed by Henry Holland for Thomas Harley, a banker and Lord Mayor of London who had bought the Berrington estate in 1775. The building is of pink sandstone ashlar construction with a portico supported by Ionic columns. The present parkland was laid out by Capability Brown, which includes the 14 acres (5.7 ha) Berrington Pool lake and island. Berrington hall, listed in 1959, is a National Trust property. The third Grade I building is Eye Manor, a 17th-century country house built for Ferdinando Gorges, which stands 30 yards (27 m) north-west from St Peter and St Paul's Church. The building is of red brick, two parallel roof ridges, and of two storeys with cellar and attics. The eastern front fascia has a central Doric portico entrance, and is of five bays with sash windows. Three roof dormer windows reflect the central three bays. Significant are the interior fixtures and fittings, particularly the ceilings in ornamental plaster-work hand modelled with naturalistic elements.

To the east from Eye village is the site of the Hereford and Shrewsbury line railway station which opened in 1866 and closed in 1958. At 300 yards (274 m) north from the junction of the A49 with Tunnel Lane, to the north from Ashton, is Castle Tump, the earthwork remains of the 33 yards (30 m) circular mound of a motte, 7 feet (2.1 m) high above the end of a natural rise of 19 feet (5.8 m). At 300 yards south-east from the junction of the A49 with Eye lane and in a field south-east from Lower Ashton Farm, are the medieval manorial earthworks of a possible fortified house, defined by two mounds, one 35 yards (32 m) square to a height of 3.75 feet (1.1 m), the other of 15 yards (14 m) diameter to a height of 4 feet (1.2 m).
