= Mary Carbery =

English writer

Mary Carbery (1867-1949) was an English author.

== Biography ==
Mary Vanessa Toulmin was born and raised at Childwickbury Manor, Hertfordshire.

She married London-born and Cambridge-educated Algernon William George Evans-Freke, 9th Baron Carbery of Castle Freke, County Cork, Ireland. Following his premature death in 1898, Carbery was left to the run the estate on her own where she raised her family. She later married Professor Arthur Wellesley Sandford of Frankfield House, County Cork, Ireland.

Amongst her books are The Children of the Dawn, The Farm by Loch Gur, The Light in the Window, Hertfordshire Heritage, The Germans in Cork (a warning to the pro-German faction in Ireland of what a German invasion would really be like), Happy World, and West Cork Journal (edited by her grandson, Jeremy Sandford). Her eldest son by her first marriage, John, 10th Baron Carbery, was an Irish nationalist and member of the Kenyan Happy Valley set. Her eldest son by her second marriage, Christopher Sandford, was proprietor of the Golden Cockerel Press.

She spent much of the early part of the last century crossing Europe in Creeping Jenny, a caravan drawn by white oxen, and is credited with being the first person to install a bath in a mobile home. She is the subject of the second half of the book "Happy Memories" (Faith Press, 1960), by her sister, Constance Toulmin.

She died at Eye Manor, Herefordshire in 1949.

== See also ==
- Vardo (Romani wagon)
