= Luston =

Village in Herefordshire, England

Coordinates: 52°16′N 2°45′W

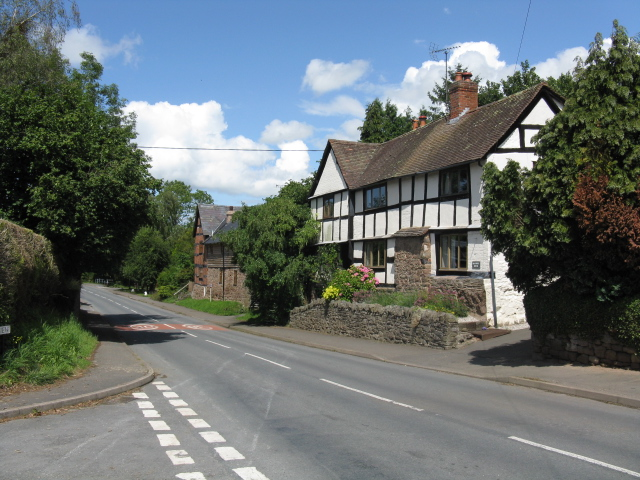

- Location within Herefordshire
- Population: 541 (2011 Census)
- Shire county: Herefordshire
- Region: West Midlands
- Country: England
- Sovereign state: United Kingdom
- Post town: Leominster
- Postcode district: HR6
- Police: West Mercia
- Fire: Hereford and Worcester
- Ambulance: West Midlands
- UK Parliament: North Herefordshire

Luston is a village and civil parish in north Herefordshire. It is 3 miles (5 km) north from Leominster on the B4361 road. To the south from the village of Luston is the hamlet of The Broad. The population of the civil parish at the 2011 census was 541.

== Facilities ==
The parish has no church but there is a Methodist chapel in the village. The village primary school opened in September 1968. The local pub is The Balance Inn. The parish hall, shared with the neighbouring village of Eye, is called Cawley Hall after the family who had their seat at nearby Berrington Hall.

Folly's Lane is a woodland near the village. It covers a total area of 1.18 hectares (2.92 acres). It is owned and managed by the Woodland Trust.
