= Jeremy Sandford =

English television screenwriter (1930–2003)

- Born: Christopher Jeremy Sandford; 5 December 1930; London, England
- Died: 12 May 2003 (aged 72); Leominster, Herefordshire, England
- Education: Eton College
- Alma mater: New College, Oxford
- Spouses: Nell Dunn (m. 1957; div. 1979) Philippa Finnis (m. 1986)
- Children: 3
- Parent(s): Christopher Sandford; Lettice Sandford

Christopher Jeremy Sandford (5 December 1930 – 12 May 2003) was an English television screenwriter who came to prominence in 1966 with Cathy Come Home, his controversial entry in BBC1's The Wednesday Play anthology strand, which was directed by Ken Loach. Later, in 1971, he wrote another successful one-off, Edna, the Inebriate Woman, for The Wednesday Play's successor series Play for Today.

== Early life ==
Sandford was born in London and brought up at Eye Manor in Herefordshire, home of his father, Christopher Sandford, who was the owner of the Golden Cockerel Press. His mother was Lettice Sandford. His paternal grandmother was the Anglo-Irish writer Mary Carbery; by her first marriage he had relatives in the Happy Valley set in Kenya.

Sandford was educated at Eton and New College, Oxford, where he read English. During national service, he was a Royal Air Force bandsman.

== Career ==
After his marriage to heiress Nell Dunn in 1957, they gave up their smart Chelsea home and went to live in unfashionable Battersea where they joined and observed the lower strata of society. From this experience he published the play Cathy Come Home in 1963, and she wrote Up the Junction.

In 1968, Sandford won a Jacob's Award for the TV production of Cathy Come Home. He wrote "Smiling David" about the death of David Oluwale. In 1980, he wrote an episode of Granada Television series Lady Killers.

Sandford became interested in gypsy causes (as his paternal grandmother had been) and for a time edited their news sheet, Romano Drom (Gypsy Road). He travelled the country seeking out gypsy stories, published as The Gypsies, and later reissued as Rokkering to the Gorjios (Talking to the non-Gypsies).

For some time the family lived on a small hill farm called Wern Watkin, outside Crickhowell in South Wales. Their attempt at sheep farming is described by their neighbour, the young Carlo Gébler, son of novelist Edna O'Brien.

== Personal life and death ==
Jeremy Sandford was married to playwright and author Nell Dunn, a granddaughter of the 5th Earl of Rosslyn, and they had three sons. The couple divorced in 1979.

He married Philippa Finnis in 1986. They had performed "The Raggle Taggle Gypsy" song at an early Mind Body Spirit Festival, and they co-wrote a BBC Radio 4 drama-documentary about the suicide of Jill Hoey.

He died at his home, Hatfield Court in Leominster, Herefordshire, at the age of 72. His last words were: "I think I'll have a rest now."
