= Prestwich by-election, 1918 =

Prestwich by-election, 1918 may refer to:

- January 1918 Prestwich by-election
- October 1918 Prestwich by-election
