= Herefordshire hoard =

Anglo-Scandinavian treasure hoard

Herefordshire Hoard
- Created: 850–900 (deposited)
- Period/culture: Viking
- Discovered: 2015; Eye, near Leominster, Herefordshire, England

The Herefordshire Hoard is a hoard of coins and jewellery dating to the Viking period found near Leominster, Herefordshire in June 2015. The find was not declared as required under the Treasure Act 1996 and the two detectorists were found guilty of theft and concealment of the find.

== Discovery ==
The hoard was discovered by metal detectorists George Powell and Layton Davies near Eye, Herefordshire, near Leominster in 2015. Under the stipulations of the Treasure Act 1996, they should have reported the find within 14 days. They did not report the find and instead sold it to dealers, except a few individual pieces which were reported to the Portable Antiquities Scheme's Finds Liaison Officer, Peter Reavill. The detectorists were illegally detecting on land owned by Lord Cawley.

== Contents of the hoard ==
Much of the hoard had been sold prior to the conviction. Antique dealers in Cardiff and London were used to sell individual items from the hoard.

The hoard originally contained an estimated 300 coins, of which 31 have been recovered along with a silver ingot, a rock-crystal pendant mounted in gold wire, a gold bracelet, and a gold finger ring. The hoard was buried in the late 9th century, from which most of the objects date. The rock-crystal pendant is thought to be 5th or 6th century in date.

The economic value of the hoard has proved difficult to establish, as much of it is still missing and is presumed hidden or sold. One collector who bought 16 of the coins estimated the value of the whole hoard to be as much as £3 million. It was reported in December 2022 that the thirty coins which had been recovered were valued at proceeds of crime hearing at Worcester Crown Court at £501,000. The missing 270 coins were also estimated to have a total value of £2.4m.

One of the coins is double-headed, showing two rulers of Anglo-Saxon England: Alfred the Great of Wessex is on one side and Ceolwulf II of Mercia on the other. The coin depicts both Ceolwulf and Alfred as kings, leading some experts to indicate that the two were equals. According to Gareth Williams of the British Museum, "these coins enable us to reinterpret our history at a key moment in the creation of England as a single kingdom."

== Conviction for theft ==
In 2019 the two detectorists were found guilty of theft and concealment of the find. The coin dealers Simon Wicks and Paul Wells were also found guilty under the concealment charge. Powell was jailed for ten years and Layton for eight-and-a-half. Wicks was jailed for five years. Wells fell ill during the sentencing hearing and was due to be sentenced at a later hearing in December 2019. In December 2022, Powell and Davies were ordered to repay more than £600,000 each or face an additional five years of imprisonment. In January 2025 a warrant was issued for Powell's arrest, after he failed to appear at Birmingham Magistrates Court.

== Acquisition and transmission ==
Herefordshire Museum Service, part of Herefordshire Council, were, as of March 2020, in the process of acquiring the surviving parts of the hoard.

In December 2020, it was announced that the story of the hoard was in the shortlist for the Current Archaeology 'Rescue Project of the Year'. Peter Reavill discussed the hoard in an episode of the BBC Radio 4 series The Digital Human on 'Treasures' on 8 March 2021.

On 20 March 2025, BBC Sounds began a podcast series, Fool's Gold, covering the story of the discovery and illegal handling of the Herefordshire hoard.

== See also ==
- List of hoards in Great Britain
- Anglo-Saxon art
- Noonans Mayfair
