= Mark Severin =

Belgian artist and graphic designer

Mark Fernand Severin
- Born: 5 January 1906; Ixelles, Brussels, Belgium
- Died: 10 September 1987 (aged 81); Uccle, Brussles, Belgium
- Occupations: Illustrator, engraver
- Spouse: Nina Holme (m. 1931)
- Awards: Grand Officer of the Order of Leopold (Belgium); Grand Officer of the Order of the Crown (Belgium); Officer of the Order of Leopold II

Mark Fernand Severin (5 January 1906 – 10 September 1987) was a Belgian illustrator, engraver, and graphic artist, best known for designing bookplates.

== Early life and education ==
Mark Fernand Severin was born on 5 January 1906 in Ixelles, Brussels. His parents were Fernand Severin (1876–1931), a poet, and Edith Lutens. From an early age, he had a passion for drawing and for observing nature. He moved to England during World War I and studied at Oxford. He finished his education at Ghent University in Belgium, studying philosophy, art, and archeology. In 1922, while still a university student, Severin began drawing for several German magazines. In 1930, he joined the Belgian Society of Maritime Artists.

In December 1931, Severin met Nina Holme, a children's book illustrator, daughter of Charles Holme, founding editor of The Studio, an illustrated fine arts and decorative arts magazine. The two married and moved to England. They would have two sons: Erik, born in 1936, and Geoffrey, born in 1946.

== Career ==
Severin was art director of the London advertising agency, C.R. Casson, from 1931 until 1939, at which time he moved back to Belgium to serve in the army for the duration of World War II. In 1944, he returned to England for four years before finally settling in Belgium. During the 1940s, Severin's artistic focus shifted gradually from painting to engraving. In 1948, he became a university professor of engraving at the Institut Supérieur des Beaux Arts in Antwerp. He was professor of graphic design at the Institut des Hautes Etudes Typographiques Plantin from 1956.

Severin specialized in fine miniature work. Over the course of his career, he made close to five hundred ex libris (many of which have erotic themes), illustrated over 30 books, and designed postage stamps for Belgium and Belgian colonies in Africa. His work has been published by Oxford University Press, the Folio Society, and the Golden Cockerel Press. He was also active as an advertisement designer in Great Britain, creating posters and campaigns for Imperial Airways, London Underground, Shell, Whitbread, and Imperial Chemical Industries.

Though largely self-taught, Severin received art instruction from the engravers Eric Gill, John Buckland-Wright and Eric Ravillious.

Severin was elected to the Belgian Royal Academy in 1950 and served as director of the Class of Arts in 1967 and 1981.

== Legacy and death ==
Pola Gaugin, a contemporary of Severin, referred to him as "the leading graphic artist in Belgium, and furthermore one of the most outstanding in England..."

Severin died in Uccle, Brussels, on 10 September 1987.

== Published works ==
- Severin, Mark F. (1949). Making a Bookplate. How to Do It #39. London: The Studio Publications.
- Severin, Mark F. (1953). Your Wood-Engraving. Your Home Crafts #17. London: Sylvan Press.
- Severin, Mark; Reid, Anthony (1972). Chambers, David (ed.). Engraved Bookplates: European Ex Libris 1950-70. Pinner, Middlesex: Private Libraries Association.

=== Selected works as illustrator ===
- Thomas & The Sparrow by Ian Serraillier, illustrated by Mark Severin. Oxford University Press, 1946
- Woman in Detail by Patrick Miller. 5 collotype plates after drawings by Severin. London: The Golden Cockerel Press, 1947
- The Homeric Hymn to Aphrodite A New Translation by F.L. Lucas, Fellow of King's College, Cambridge. Ten Engravings by Mark Severin. London: Golden Cockerel Press, 1948
- Circe and Ulysses Translated by William Browne. Illustrations by Mark Severin. London: Golden Cockerel Press, 1954
- Aollonius of Tyre. Historia Apollonii Regis Tyri Translated by Paul Turner. Six engravings by Mark Severin. London: Golden Cockerel Press London, 1956
- Eve's Moods Unveiled by Jonathan Hanaghan. Copper engravings by Mark Severin. Dublin: Runa Press, 1957
- Five Japanese Love Stories by Ihara Saikaku, illustrated with wood engravings by Mark Severin. London: Folio Society, 1958
- Stories by Karel van de Woestijne, illustrations by Mark Severin. Amsterdam: World Library Association, 1959
- Beowulf the Warrior Ian Serraillier, illustrations by Mark Severin. New York: Henry Z. Walck, Inc., 1961.
