= Eye, Herefordshire =

Village in Herefordshire, England

Coordinates: 52.2708°N 2.74033°W

Eye
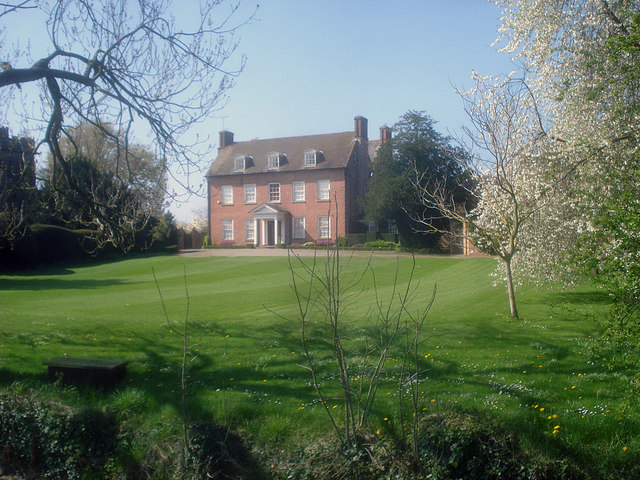
- Eye Manor

- Location within Herefordshire
- OS grid reference: SO495638
  - London: 125 mi (201 km) SE
- Civil parish: Eye, Moreton and Ashton
- Unitary authority: Herefordshire
- Ceremonial county: Herefordshire
- Region: West Midlands
- Country: England
- Sovereign state: United Kingdom
- Post town: Leominster
- Postcode district: HR6
- Police: West Mercia
- Fire: Hereford and Worcester
- Ambulance: West Midlands
- UK Parliament: North Herefordshire

Eye is a small village in the Eye, Moreton and Ashton civil parish of Herefordshire, England, and 3 miles (5 km) north from Leominster, 15 miles (24 km) north from the city and county town of Hereford, and in the catchment area of the River Lugg.

Eye has a small historic church with a square tower and effigies; beside it is Eye Manor, noted for its decorated plaster ceilings, and a village hall—the Cawley Hall—named after the local Cawley family.

At 1 mile (1.6 km) to the east, between the villages of Moreton and Ashton, is Berrington Hall, a Henry Holland house with Capability Brown landscape, which was built for Thomas Harley.

The Welsh Marches Line runs through the closed Berrington and Eye railway station, which previously served the village. The station opened on 6 December 1853 and closed on 9 June 1958.

Admiral James Vashon (1742 – 1827) was born here. In 2015 metal detectorists found a Viking hoard worth £3 million in a field in the village but failed to report it as treasure.

== See also ==
- Herefordshire hoard
