= Tony Buzan =

English author and educational consultant (1942–2019)

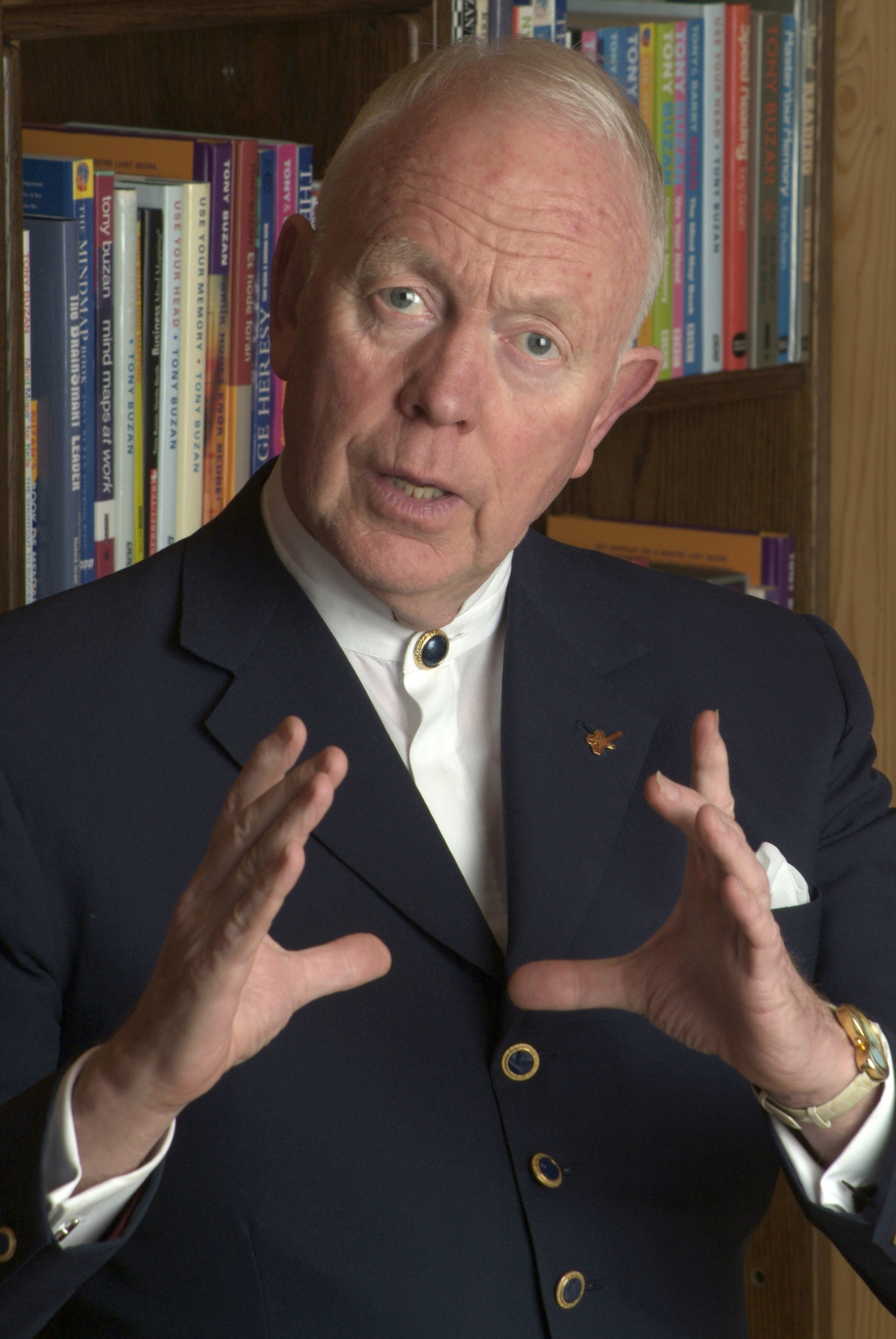
- Buzan in 2007
- Born: Anthony Peter Buzan; 2 June 1942; Palmers Green, Middlesex, United Kingdom
- Died: 13 April 2019 (aged 76); John Radcliffe Hospital
- Relatives: Barry Buzan Jean Buzan Gordon Buzan
- Writing career
- Notable works: Use your head, The Speed Reading Book, The Mind Map Book,
- Website: tonybuzan.com

Anthony Peter Buzan (/ˈbuːzən/; 2 June 1942 – 13 April 2019) was an English author and educational consultant.

Buzan popularised the idea of mental literacy, radiant thinking, and a technique called mind mapping, inspired by techniques used by Leonardo da Vinci, Albert Einstein, and Joseph D. Novak's "concept mapping" techniques.

== Early life ==
Buzan was born in Palmers Green, Enfield, Middlesex, and was an alumnus of Kitsilano Secondary School in Vancouver. His brother is the academic Barry Buzan. Buzan completed his undergraduate studies in psychology, English, mathematics and science at the University of British Columbia, and was a charter student at Simon Fraser University in 1965–66 where he spent a year as a graduate student and the inaugural president of the Simon Fraser Student Society. During his time at SFU, Buzan became very involved in Mensa, going on to become editor of the International Journal of Mensa.

== Career ==
He was a promoter of mnemonic systems and mind mapping techniques. He launched his own software programme to support mind mapping called iMindMap in December 2006 with Welsh entrepreneur, Chris Griffiths. The Buzan Organisation holds trademarks on the phrase "Mind Maps" in the context of self-improvement educational courses in the UK, the USA and Germany.

Following his 1970s series Use Your Head for the BBC, many of his ideas were set down in a series of five books: Use Your Memory, Master Your Memory, Use Your Head, The Speed Reading Book and The Mind Map Book. He was author or co-author of more than 80 books altogether. His five BBC books had, by 2003, sold over 3 million copies.

As a popular psychology author, Tony Buzan wrote on subjects relating to the brain, "genius quotient (GQ)", spiritual intelligence, memory, creativity and speed reading. He was the founder and President of the Brain Foundation (not to be confused with various medical-related bodies with the same name) and also the Brain Trust Charity, the World Memory Championships and the World Championships of the Brain. He was a co-founder of London's Mind Body Spirit Festival as well as the Mind Sports Olympiad, and World Brain Day.

He died aged 76 at John Radcliffe Hospital, Oxford of a heart attack.

== Selected bibliography ==
- Speed Reading, Sphere, London, 20 May 1971, ISBN 0-7221-2119-9
- Spore One – Structure in Hyperspace, 25 September 1972, ISBN 0-85115-016-0
- Use Your Head, January 1974, ISBN 0-563-10790-1
- Speed Memory, 27 January 1977, ISBN 0-7153-7365-X
- Make the Most of Your Mind, February 1984, ISBN 0-671-49519-4
- Use Your Perfect Memory, Plume Penguin Group, January 1991, ISBN 0-452-26606-8
- Use Both Sides of Your Brain, Plume Penguin Group, Jan 1991, ISBN 0-452-26603-3
- The Mind Map Book, 6 September 1993, ISBN 0-563-36373-8
- Mind Maps for kids – An Introduction – The shortcut to success at school, Thorsons, 2003
- Mind Maps for kids – Study Skills, Thorsons, 2004
- Mind Maps for kids – Max your Memory and Concentration, Thorsons, 2005
- Concordea, December 2006
- Requiem For Ted, December 2006
- Use Your Memory, BBC Publications, ISBN 1-4066-1018-6
- Master Your Memory, BBC Publications, ISBN 1-4066-1022-4
- The Memory Book, BBC Publications, 2010, ISBN 978-1-4066-4426-5
- Mind Maps for Business, BBC Publications, 2010, ISBN 978-1-4066-4290-2
- Brain Training for Kids, Proactive Press, 2012, ISBN 978-1-908934-00-0
- The Most Important Graph in the World, Proactive Press, 2012, ISBN 978-1-908934-01-7
- Modern Mind Mapping for Smarter Thinking e-book, Proactive Press, March 2013
- Mind Map Mastery – The Complete Guide to Learning and Using the Most Powerful Thinking Tool in the Universe, Watkins, 2018, ISBN 978-1-78678-141-3
