= Gay Taylor =

English writer and publisher (1896–1970)

- Born: Ethelwynne Stewart McDowall; 27 September 1896; Castleford, Yorkshire, England
- Died: 29 November 1970 (aged 74); Herefordshire, England
- Occupation: Writer
- Spouse: Harold Midgely Taylor
- Writing career
- Pen name: Loran Hurnscot

Gay Taylor (née, McDowall; pen name, Loran Hurnscot; 27 September 1896 – 29 November 1970) was an English writer and co-founder, with Harold (Hal) Midgely Taylor, of the Golden Cockerel Press.

== Early life ==
Ethelwynne (nickname, "Gay") Stewart McDowall was born on 27 September 1896 in Castleford, Yorkshire. Her father, Robert Moffatt McDowall, was a surveyor, and he and his wife, Helen (née Murdock) had three children: Ethelwynne; Hugh, born 1898; and Sheila, born 1910. Hugh died in an airplane crash in June 1918 while training with the Royal Air Force.

She attended Leeds Girls' High School, where she won a music scholarship and had her poems published in the school magazine. In 1917, she moved to London and worked as a secretary at the Daily Herald. She shared a flat with Hilda Margaret (Pran) Pyper and Barbara Blackburn, who later appeared in fictional form in her novel No Goodness in the Worm.

== Marriage ==
In April 1920, she married Hal Taylor, who was struggling to start a commercial orchard on property he had purchased near Waltham St Lawrence in Berkshire. Although their marriage certificate records her name as Ethelwynne, she had begun to use the name Gay, and for the rest of her life she was known to her acquaintances as Gay Taylor.

== Founding of Golden Cockerel Press ==
As Taylor recounts in both No Goodness in the Worm and A Prison, A Paradise, the couple shared little in common aside from creative aspirations. But later that year, they purchased a printing press and other book-making equipment and founded the Golden Cockerel Press with the aim of publishing new authors in artistic limited editions of 500 copies or fewer.

In a manifesto announcing the opening of the press, they declared: "This Press is a co-operative society for the printing and publishing of books. It is co-operative in the strictest sense. Its members are their own craftsmen, and will produce their books themselves in their own communal workshops without recourse to paid and irresponsible labour."

Already suffering from the effects of tuberculosis, Hal Taylor relied heavily on the help of Taylor and her former roommates to set up and run the press, learning through trial and error.

== Affair and death of husband ==
One of the first books published by the Golden Cockerel Press was A. E. Coppard's first short-story collection, Adam and Even & Pinch Me (1921). The press went on to publish more than a dozen short story and poetry collections by Coppard. Coppard began helping out with the press, in part in dismay at the poor quality of its releases of his work. He later recalled that "the type was poor, the paper bad, the leaves fell out, the cover collapsed."

He also began an affair with Gay Taylor. She became pregnant by Coppard but had an abortion. The affair played out over several years, and at one point, her despair over his interest in other women led her to attempt suicide. The affair was a central experience in Gay Taylor's life and she recounted it twice, once in fictional form in No Goodness in the Worm (1930) and later in A Prison, A Paradise (1959).

In January 1924, Harold Taylor was compelled by ill health to retire and the Press was taken over by Robert Gibbings. Taylor died on 12 March 1925. He bequeathed the bulk of his estate to his sister, leaving only £50 to Gay.

== Writing ==
She returned to London and began writing No Goodness in the Worm. The novel received generally positive reviews. Writing in The Times Literary Supplement, Marjorie Grant Cook called it "a first novel of exciting quality: one of those uncommon books whose first page is a good through which the reader enters a little world of other people’s lives and is lost for the time to his own." Frances Lamont Robbins, on the other had, dismissed it: "If English feminism has a literature, this novel must represent its lowest point; for it is one of the rankest pieces of nonsense that this patient reviewer ever read."

In the 1930s she began studying Schopenhauer and attempted to write another novel. She attended lectures by P. D. Ouspensky but found his system "too cold and too shallow for me". She also considered joining a community of Anglican nuns at Peakirk in Cambridgeshire. She worked sporadically, accepting the consequence poverty: "Either one has money but no time, or time but no money." She refused to make contact with her family, who she referred to as "pachyderms."

== World War II ==
During World War II, she worked at first as a postal censor, but gave that up in September 1942 to join the staff of Mass-Observation. She wrote that the work was "full of sparkling surprises, given and received." There she befriended the poet Kathleen Raine, who was then married to Charles Madge, one of Mass-Observation's founders. Raine later wrote that Gay Taylor "understood me better than I did myself; sustained me in times of deepest spiritual danger, never condemned or relinquished me." She also recalled that Gay "refused to take full-time work because "the living of her inner life was the important thing, the whole meaning of her existence."

== A Prison, A Paradise ==
In 1959, Gay Taylor published A Prison, A Paradise under the name of Loran Hurnscot, an anagram drawn from what she considered her worst sins, sloth and rancour. The first part, "The Summer Birdcage", is drawn from her diaries from 1922 to 1929 and focuses on her affair with Coppard, referred to as "Barney", and its aftermath. The second part, "The Tilted Spiral", recounts her spiritual journey between 1936 and 1958.

In her introduction, Raine linked the two parts, writing: "The same thirst for perfection, the same capacity for truthfulness that led the young woman into the toils of earthly love, was to lead her beyond this first phase of spiritual awakening to the reality of which the natural world is but a shadow or reflection." In The Times Literary Supplement, Elizabeth Jennings called it "a faithful, highly subjective account of a restless, tormented life".

== Death ==
According to Elisabeth Russell Taylor, Gay Taylor "struggled in poverty and ill-health, preferring to buy books rather than a meal," living in isolation much of the time. She died of pancreatic cancer in Pencombe Bromyard, Herefordshire.

== Works ==
=== As Gay Taylor ===
- No Goodness in the Worm (1930)

=== As Loran Hurnscot ===
- A Prison, A Paradise (1958)
