= Prestwich (constituency) =

Parliamentary constituency in the United Kingdom, 1885–1918

- Former county constituency for the House of Commons

1885–1918
- Seats: one
- Created from: South East Lancashire
- Replaced by: Middleton and Prestwich

Prestwich was a constituency in the county of Lancashire of the House of Commons for the Parliament of the United Kingdom. Created by the Redistribution of Seats Act 1885, it was represented by one Member of Parliament. The constituency was abolished in 1918.

== Boundaries ==
The constituency of South-East Lancashire, Prestwich Division was created by the Redistribution of Seats Act 1885, with the official title. It consisted of an area of the parliamentary county of Lancashire between the boroughs of Salford and Oldham. It consisted of the following civil parishes and townships:

- Blackley
- Chadderton
- Crompton
- Crumpsall
- Droylsden
- Failsworth
- Great Heaton
- Little Heaton
- Moston
- Prestwich
- Royton
- And the part of the parish of Ashton-under-Lyne not included in the municipal borough.

The electorate also consisted of the freeholders of the municipal boroughs of Ashton-under-Lyne and Oldham who were entitled to vote in the county.

== Abolition ==
The constituency was abolished by the Representation of the People Act 1918, with its area divided between four new constituencies:

- Blackley, Crumpsall, and Moston (which had been added to the City of Manchester in 1890) became the Parliamentary Borough of Manchester Blackley.
- Chadderton, Great Heaton, Little Heaton and Prestwich became part of Middleton and Prestwich Division
- Droylsden and Failsworth were included in Mossley Division
- Crompton and Royton, along with five other urban districts, formed Royton Division.

== Members of Parliament ==
Election	Member	Party
1885	Abel Buckley	Liberal
1886	Robert Mowbray	Conservative
1895	Frederick Cawley	Liberal
1918 (January)	Oswald Cawley	Liberal
1918 (October)	Austin Hopkinson	Liberal
1918 (December)	constituency abolished	

== Elections ==
Decades:	1880s; 1890s; 1900s; 1910s

=== Elections in the 1880s ===
General election 1885: Prestwich
Party	Candidate	Votes	%	±%
Liberal	Abel Buckley	5,414	53.6	
Conservative	Robert Mowbray	4,686	46.4	
Majority		728	7.2	
Turnout		10,100	90.5	
Registered electors		11,156		
Liberal win (new seat)				

General election 1886: Prestwich
Party	Candidate	Votes	%	±%
Conservative	Robert Mowbray	4,843	50.7	+4.3
Liberal	Abel Buckley	4,704	49.3	−4.3
Majority		139	1.4	N/A
Turnout		9,547	85.6	−4.9
Registered electors		11,156		
Conservative gain from Liberal		Swing	+4.3	

=== Elections in the 1890s ===
Agnew

General election 1892: Prestwich
Party	Candidate	Votes	%	±%
Conservative	Robert Mowbray	5,718	50.7	0.0
Liberal	William Agnew	5,563	49.3	0.0
Majority		155	1.4	0.0
Turnout		11,281	87.9	+2.1
Registered electors		12,827		
Conservative hold		Swing	0.0	

Cawley

General election 1895: Prestwich
Party	Candidate	Votes	%	±%
Liberal	Frederick Cawley	6,039	50.4	+1.1
Conservative	Robert Mowbray	5,938	49.6	−1.1
Majority		101	0.8	N/A
Turnout		11,977	86.7	−1.2
Registered electors		13,812		
Liberal gain from Conservative		Swing	+1.1	

=== Elections in the 1900s ===
General election 1900: Prestwich
Party	Candidate	Votes	%	±%
Liberal	Frederick Cawley	7,127	52.7	+2.3
Conservative	Sir Henry Houldsworth, 2nd Baronet	6,406	47.3	−2.3
Majority		721	5.4	+4.6
Turnout		13,533	86.0	−0.7
Registered electors		15,732		
Liberal hold		Swing	+2.3	

Cawley

General election 1906: Prestwich
Party	Candidate	Votes	%	±%
Liberal	Frederick Cawley	10,187	62.8	+10.1
Conservative	W T Hedges	6,024	37.2	−10.1
Majority		4,163	25.6	+20.2
Turnout		16,211	84.1	−1.9
Registered electors		19,267		
Liberal hold		Swing	+10.1	

=== Elections in the 1910s ===
Potter

General election January 1910: Prestwich
Party	Candidate	Votes	%	±%
Liberal	Frederick Cawley	11,564	58.6	−4.2
Conservative	Cyril Potter	8,180	41.4	+4.2
Majority		3,384	17.2	−8.4
Turnout		19,744	89.2	+5.1
Registered electors		22,123		
Liberal hold		Swing	-4.2	

Cawley

General election December 1910: Prestwich
Party	Candidate	Votes	%	±%
Liberal	Frederick Cawley	10,355	59.0	+0.4
Conservative	Frederick Brocklehurst	7,189	41.0	−0.4
Majority		3,166	18.0	+0.8
Turnout		17,544	79.3	−9.9
Registered electors		22,123		
Liberal hold		Swing	+0.4	

General Election 1914–15:

Another General Election was required to take place before the end of 1915. The political parties had been making preparations for an election to take place and by July 1914, the following candidates had been selected;

- Liberal: Frederick Cawley
- Unionist: Frederick Brocklehurst

Cawley

January 1918 Prestwich by-election
Party	Candidate	Votes	%	±%
Liberal	Oswald Cawley	8,520	75.1	+16.1
Co-operative Party	Henry May	2,832	24.9	New
Majority		5,688	50.2	+32.2
Turnout		11,352	42.8	−36.5
Liberal hold		Swing		

October 1918 Prestwich by-election
Party	Candidate	Votes	%	±%
Liberal	Austin Hopkinson	Unopposed		
Liberal hold				

== See also ==
- Prestwich-cum-Oldham
