= Christopher Sandford =

British book designer and publisher

Christopher Sandford (1902–1983) of Eye Manor, Herefordshire, was a book designer, proprietor of the Golden Cockerel Press, a founding director of the Folio Society, and husband of the wood engraver and pioneer Corn dolly revivalist, Lettice Sandford, née Mackintosh Rate. During the war he organised preparations for underground resistance from Eye Manor in the event of a Nazi invasion.

== Biography ==
He was born in Cork, Ireland, son of Professor Arthur Wellesley Sandford and Mary Carbery, the Anglo-Irish author. By her first marriage he had a half-brother in the Happy Valley set in Kenya. He married engraver Lettice Mackintosh Rate in 1929. Their son was playwright and musician, Jeremy Sandford.
