= Eye Manor =

Manor house in Herefordshire, England

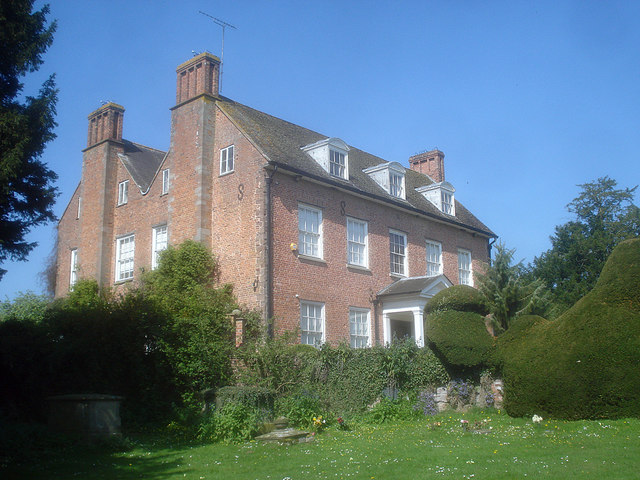
- "An astonishing surprise" within a "noncommittal exterior"

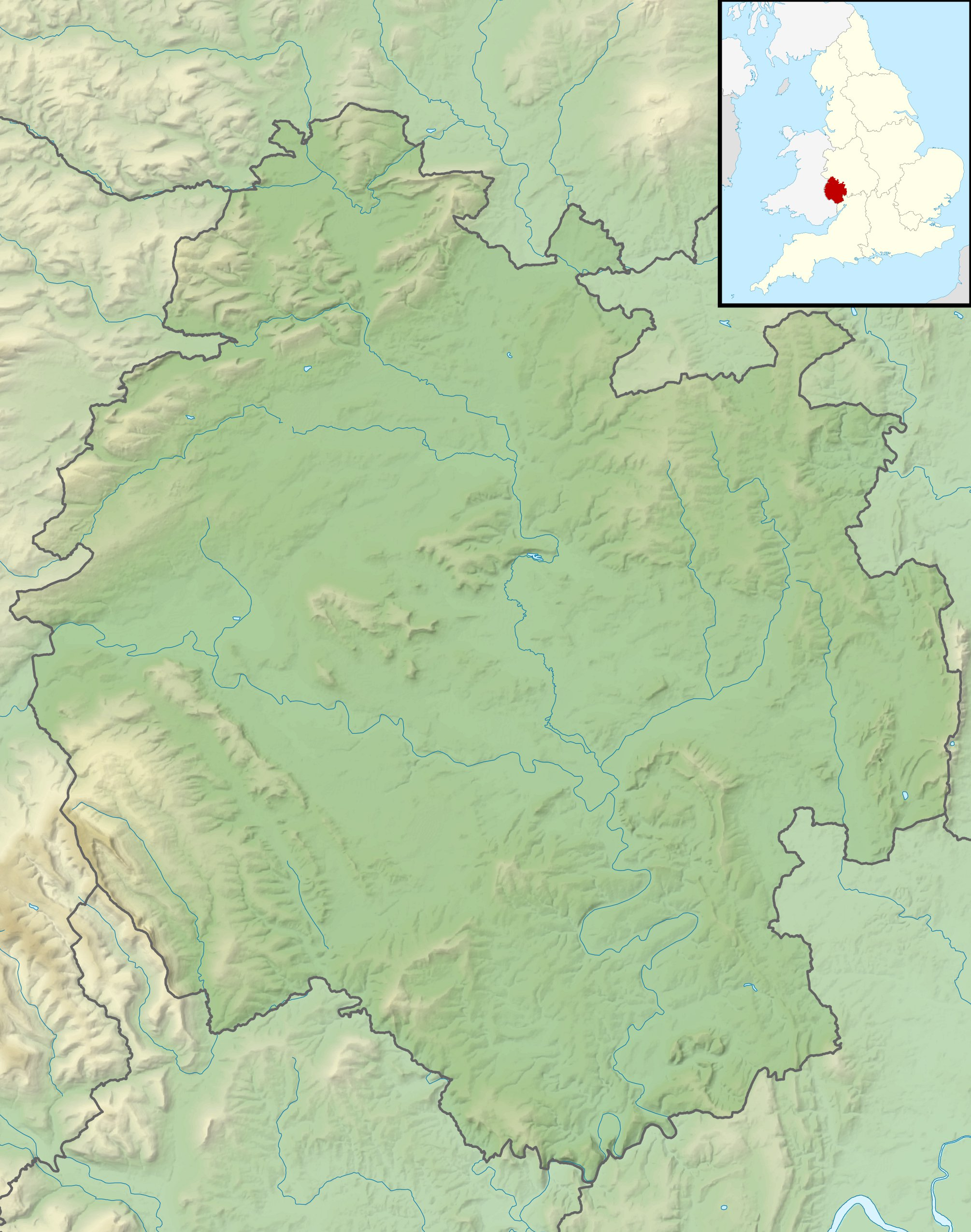
- Location within Herefordshire
- 52.2704°N 2.7399°W
- Type: House
- Location: Eye, Herefordshire, England

History
- Built: c.1673-1680

Site notes
- Architectural style: Carolean
- Governing body: Privately owned

Listed Building – Grade I
- Official name: Eye Manor
- Designated: 11 June 1959
- Reference no.: 1349522

Eye Manor is a Carolean manor house in Eye, Herefordshire, England. It dates from the late 17th century and was built for Ferdinando Gorges. Noted for its interior plasterwork, the house is a Grade I listed building.

== History ==
Ferdinando Gorges (c.1565-1647) was an English soldier whose establishment of the Province of Maine saw him called the "Father of English Colonization in North America". His descendant, also Ferdinando, bought the Eye estate in 1673 and began building the house shortly thereafter. A datestone above the main doorway carries a date of 1680. Coats of arms within the house carry the insignia of Gorges and of his wife, Meliora Gorges, née Hilliard. Gorges' son, Henry sat as a member of parliament for Herefordshire in the early 18th century.

In the 20th century, Eye Manor was the home of the publisher Christopher Sandford, who owned the Golden Cockerel Press, and his wife Lettice Sandford. Their son Jeremy Sandford, the writer and director of the television drama Cathy Come Home, grew up at the house. Following his death in 2003, the manor was sold.

In 2009, the house was bought by the Conservative politician Robert Jenrick for £1.1 million. In April 2020, during the coronavirus pandemic, Jenrick, then serving as the Secretary of State for Housing, Communities and Local Government, became the subject of media interest when he visited the house, and his parents' home in Shrewsbury, in apparent contravention of the government's advice against non-essential travel.

== Architecture and description ==
Eye Manor is noted for the quality of its interior decoration, which Pevsner and Brooks describe as "an astonishing surprise" within an exterior "as noncommittal as a black double-breasted overcoat". The house is built of red brick to a traditional double-pile plan. Later additions include the doric porch which dates from the 18th century, and some minor modification undertaken in the early 20th century. It is of two storeys, with cellars and attics.

The plain exterior conceals the embellished interior which has "gorgeously enriched" panelling, bolection moulded stone fireplaces and "outstanding" plaster ceilings. The quality and style of the plasterwork in the house bears similarities to that at Holyrood Palace which led Geoffrey Beard, a historian of English decorative arts, to suggest that the same craftsmen may have been involved. (Note: Sir John Summerson also notes the similarities between the woodwork and plasterwork at Holyrood and "early Restoration work in England".)

Eye Manor is a Grade I listed building.

== Sources ==
- Beard, Geoffrey (2011). Decorative plasterwork in Great Britain. Dorset: Donhead. ISBN 978-1-873-39491-5.
- Brooks, Alan; Pevsner, Nikolaus (2012). Herefordshire. The Buildings of England. New Haven, US and London: Yale University Press. ISBN 978-0-300-12575-7.
- Gomme, Andor; Maguire, Alison (2008). Design and plan in the country house : from Castle Donjons to Palladian boxes. New Haven, US and London: Yale University Press. ISBN 978-0-300-12645-7.
- Hill, Oliver; Cornforth, John (1966). English Country Houses: Caroline, 1625-1685. London: Country Life. OCLC 462687501.
- Laughton, J.K. (1890). "Gorges, Sir Ferdinando". In Stephen, Leslie; Lee, Sidney (eds.). Dictionary of National Biography. Vol. 22. New York: Macmillan and Co. pp. 241–43.
- Pevsner, Nikolaus (2003). Herefordshire. The Buildings of England. New Haven, US and London: Yale University Press. ISBN 0-300-09609-7.
- Rogers, Pat (2011). The Life and Times of Thomas, Lord Coningsby: The Whig Hangman and His Victims. London: Bloomsbury. ISBN 978-1-441-13798-2.
- Summerson, John (1955). Architecture in Britain: 1530-1830. Pelican History of Art. London: Penguin Books. OCLC 915707152.
