= Oswald Cawley =

British soldier and politician

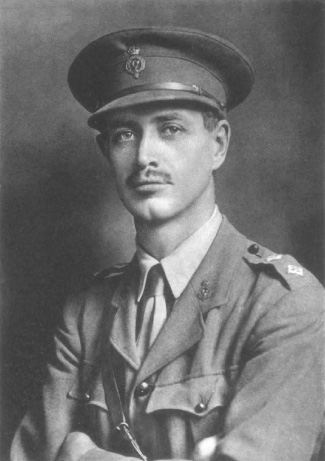
Oswald Cawley

Oswald Cawley (7 October 1882 – 22 August 1918), styled The Honourable from January 1918, was a British soldier and Liberal Party politician.

He was the fourth and youngest son of Frederick Cawley, 1st Baron Cawley and his wife Elizabeth Smith, daughter of John Smith. An older brother was Harold Thomas Cawley. Cawley was educated at Rugby School and New College, Oxford, where he graduated with a Bachelor of Arts. He served as lieutenant of the Shropshire Yeomanry and became a captain of the King's Shropshire Light Infantry. He fought in the First World War, where he was killed in action near Merville. Cawley was buried in Néry Communal Cemetery.

Shortly before his death in 1918, Cawley had been elected in a by-election in January to succeed his father as Member of Parliament (MP) for Prestwich.

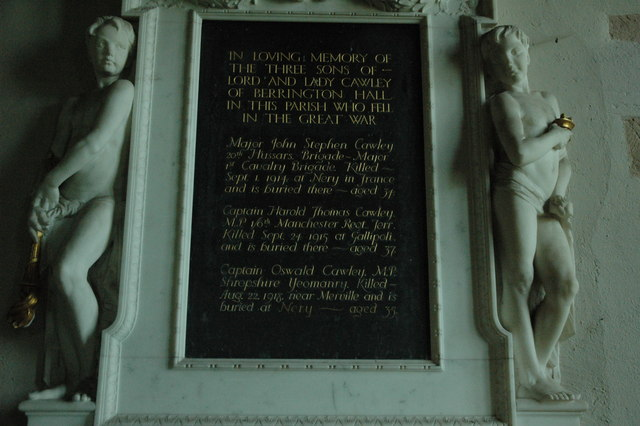
Memorial to the Cawley brothers in St Peter and St Paul Church, Eye, Herefordshire

It was in memory of Oswald and two other sons - Harold and John - who died in the war that their father endowed a ward at Ancoats Hospital, Manchester, in 1919 at a cost of £10,000. All three brothers are commemorated on the Parliamentary War Memorial in Westminster Hall. Oswald and Harold, on Panel 8, are among the 22 MPs that died during World War I to be named on that memorial. John, included on the memorial as the son of an MP, appears on Panel 2 of the memorial. Oswald Cawley is one of 19 MPs who fell in the war who are commemorated by heraldic shields in the Commons Chamber. A further act of commemoration came with the unveiling in 1932 of a manuscript-style illuminated book of remembrance for the House of Commons, which includes short biographical accounts of the life and death of the Cawley brothers.

Parliament of the United Kingdom
Preceded by Sir Frederick Cawley, Bt	Member of Parliament for Prestwich; January 1918 – October 1918	Succeeded by Austin Hopkinson
