= Ethelbert White =

English artist and wood engraver

Ethelbert White (26 February 1891 - 5 March 1972) was an English artist and wood engraver. He was an early member of the Society of Wood Engravers and a founding member of the English Wood Engraving Society in 1925. He also worked in oils and water colour. He was a member of the Royal Watercolour Society, and exhibited regularly at the Royal Academy.

== Wood engravings ==
White's introduction to wood engraving came in 1920. Hitherto he had worked largely in watercolour. In 1920 Cyril Beaumont, for whom he had produced designs for booklets on the Russian ballet (L'Oiseau de Feu, The Three Cornered Hat, Thamar and Impressions of the Russian Ballet, all 1919) and two limited editions (Eclogues, a Book of Poems 1919 and The Smile of the Sphinx 1920), asked him to produce colour wood engravings for an edition of W. W. Gibson's Home for his Beaumont Press. White then started to produce independent wood engravings very much in the modern style advocated by Noel Rooke. These were unusually large in scale.

White's most important book illustrated with wood engravings is The Story of My Heart by Richard Jefferies, published by Duckworth in 1923. Thomas Balston considers this to be the first substantial book illustrated with modern wood engravings to be published in Britain. In the same year the Golden Cockerel Press published an edition of Spenser's Wedding Songs with colour wood engravings by White.

His final set of wood engravings was for Thoreau's Walden, published by Penguin Books as part of a series of 10 books called the Penguin Illustrated Classics in 1938. By 1940 he had ceased to produce wood engravings.

== Work in oils and watercolour ==
White was very much a member of the art scene in England. He was elected to the London Group in 1915 and became a member of the New English Art Club in 1921. He was one of the first artists to become a member of the Artists' International Association. He was a member of the Royal Watercolour Society and exhibited regularly at the Royal Academy.

He was much in sympathy with British avant-garde artists and was influenced by the Post-Impressionist painters in France. Hilary Chapman describes him as a pastoralist, "his artistic vision rooted in his genuine delight in nature". His work, which became looser and more impressionistic as time progressed, consists of a very large number of oil paintings and watercolours.

== His life and work ==
White came from a wealthy background and had no need to sell his work to live. In 1919 he married Elizabeth Crofton Dodwell, better known as Betty, and in the same year studied at St John's Wood School of Art in London. In the early 1920s he bought an original horse-drawn gypsy caravan which he drove around London; it also became the summer home for the couple as they drove around Surrey and Sussex. They enjoyed the simple life, but it was the simple life of the rich, as White bought a second home in Amberley as a studio for the summer months. They loved parties, and Bertie and Betty were much in demand as entertainers, White on the guitar and Betty singing. They were a very sociable and loving couple. White became president of the Artists' General Benevolent Institution in 1933.

White was a traditional English landscape artist, and his subject matter was mostly the scenery of Southern England. After his death there were several memorial exhibitions, notably at the Fine Art Society in 1979. A centenary exhibition of his wood engravings was held at the Pallant Gallery in 1991.
