= Wyson =

Hamlet in Herefordshire, England

Coordinates: 52.306°N 2.705°W

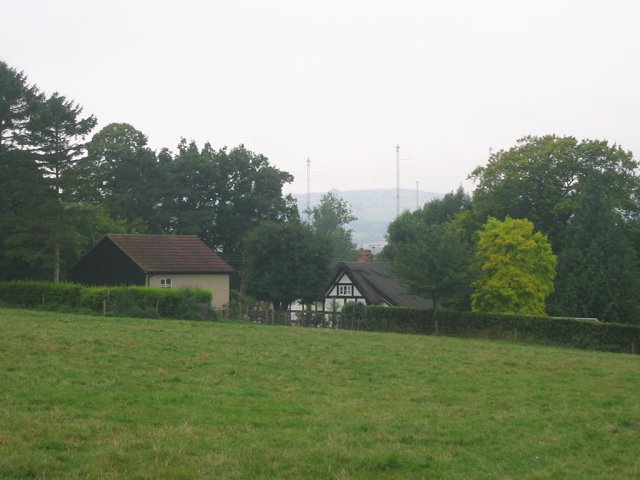
Cottage in Wyson

Wyson is a hamlet in north Herefordshire, England, situated west of the A49 road and the adjacent village of Brimfield.

It lies in the civil parish of Brimfield. The border with Shropshire (and the Salopian village of Woofferton) is immediately to the north.
