= Ashton, Herefordshire =

Village in Herefordshire, England

Coordinates: 52.2761°N 2.71093°W

Ashton
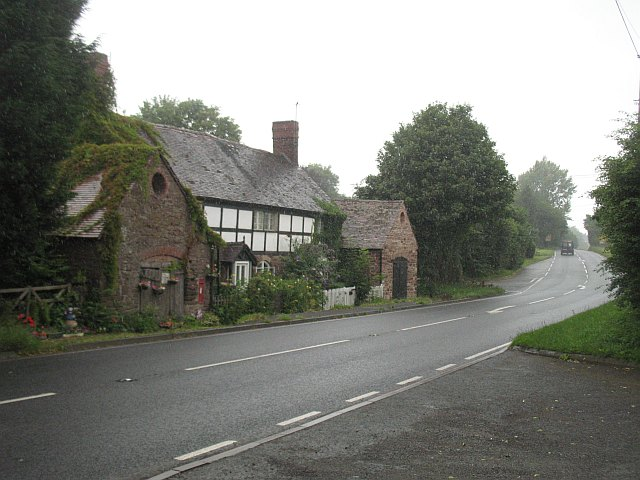
- The A49 in Ashton

- Location within Herefordshire
- OS grid reference: SO5164
- Civil parish: Eye, Moreton and Ashton
- Unitary authority: Herefordshire
- Ceremonial county: Herefordshire
- Region: West Midlands
- Country: England
- Sovereign state: United Kingdom
- Police: West Mercia
- Fire: Hereford and Worcester
- Ambulance: West Midlands
- UK Parliament: North Herefordshire

Ashton is a village in the Eye, Moreton and Ashton civil parish of Herefordshire, England, and is 3 miles (5 km) north from Leominster, 15 miles (24 km) north from the city and county town of Hereford, and in the catchment area of the River Lugg. The village is on the A49 road; to the north is Brimfield. Bordering the village to the south-west is Berrington Hall.

Recorded in the Domesday Book, Ashton was in the hundred of Leominster. In the National Gazetteer of Britain and Ireland of 1868 it was listed as in the hundred of Wolphy.
