= Lettice Sandford =

Lettice Sandford (born Lettice Mackintosh Rate; 1902–1993) was a draughtswoman, wood-engraver, pioneer corn dolly revivalist and watercolourist of her beloved Herefordshire. She was a daughter of Lachlan Mackintosh Rate of Milton Court, Surrey, a director of the Imperial Ottoman Bank, the central bank of the Ottoman Empire, and wife of Christopher Sandford of Eye Manor, Herefordshire, proprietor of the Golden Cockerel Press, for which she provided wood-engravings. She was the mother of playwright Jeremy Sandford.
