= Frederick Cawley, 1st Baron Cawley =

British politician and businessman (1850-1937)

The Right Honourable The Lord Cawley PC JP
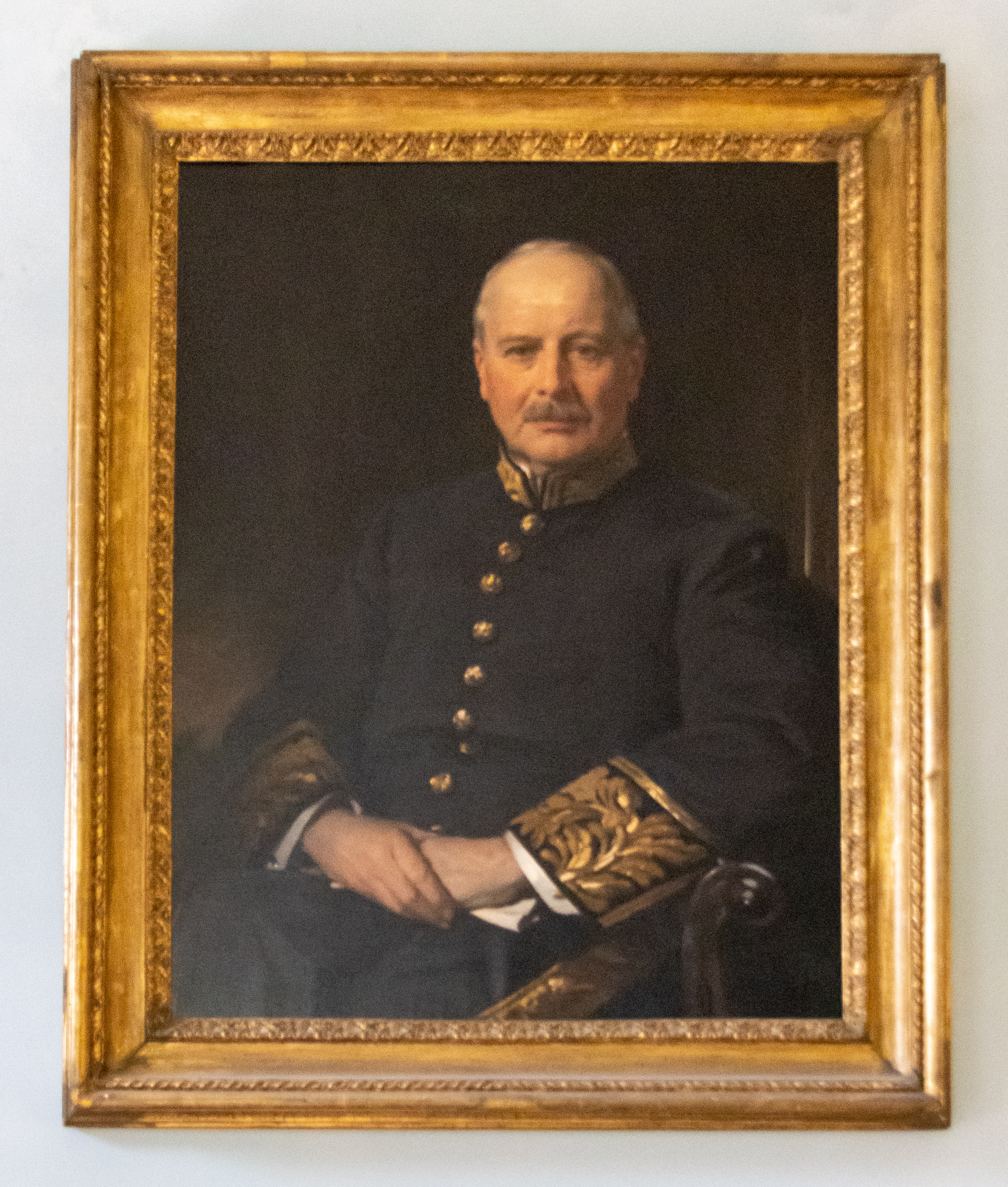
- Portrait at Berrington Hall

Chancellor of the Duchy of Lancaster
- In office 10 December 1916 – 10 February 1918
- Monarch: George V
- Prime Minister: David Lloyd George
- Preceded by: Thomas McKinnon Wood
- Succeeded by: The Lord Beaverbrook

Personal details
- Born: 9 October 1850 Priestlands, Bunbury, Cheshire, UK
- Died: 30 March 1937 (aged 86) Berrington Hall, near Leominster, Herefordshire, UK
- Party: Liberal
- Spouse: Elizabeth Smith (d. 1930)

Frederick Cawley, 1st Baron Cawley PC, JP (9 October 1850 – 30 March 1937), known as Sir Frederick Cawley, Bt, between 1906 and 1918, was a British businessman and Liberal Party politician. A wealthy cotton merchant, he represented Prestwich in parliament between 1895 and 1918 and served as Chancellor of the Duchy of Lancaster between 1916 and 1918. Created a baronet in 1906, he was ennobled as Baron Cawley in 1918.

== Background and education ==
Cawley was born at Priestlands, Bunbury, Cheshire, the son of Thomas Cawley (1806–1875) by Harriet Bird, daughter of Samuel Bird, of Beeston Hall, Cheshire. He was educated at Aldersey School, Bunbury, and at Wesley College, Sheffield.

== Political career ==
Frederick Cawley circa 1895

Cawley was involved in the Lancashire cotton industry, which made him a wealthy man. At the 1895 general election he was elected as Member of Parliament for Prestwich, a seat he held until 1918. In 1916 he was admitted to the Privy Council and appointed Chancellor of the Duchy of Lancaster in the war-time coalition of David Lloyd George, a post he held until 1918. He was also appointed to the Dardanelles Commission. Cawley was created a Baronet, of Prestwich in the County Palatine of Lancaster, in 1906, and was raised to the peerage as Baron Cawley, of Prestwich in the County Palatine of Lancaster, in 1918. He was also a Justice of the Peace for Herefordshire.

== Family ==
Lord Cawley married Elizabeth Smith, daughter of John Smith and Fanny Robson, in 1876. They had four sons, of whom the three youngest, Harold Cawley MP, John and Oswald Cawley MP, were killed in the First World War, and one daughter, Hilda Cawley. In memory of his three dead sons, Cawley endowed a ward at Ancoats Hospital, Manchester, in 1919 at a cost of £10,000.

In 1901 Cawley acquired the estate of Berrington Hall near Leominster in Herefordshire, which had previously been in the hands of the Rodney family. This was the family seat until 1957, when it was handed over to the government in lieu of death duties, and it is now in the care of the National Trust. Lady Cawley died in March 1930. Lord Cawley died at Berrington Hall in March, 1937, aged 86, and was succeeded in the baronetcy and barony by his eldest and only surviving son, Robert.

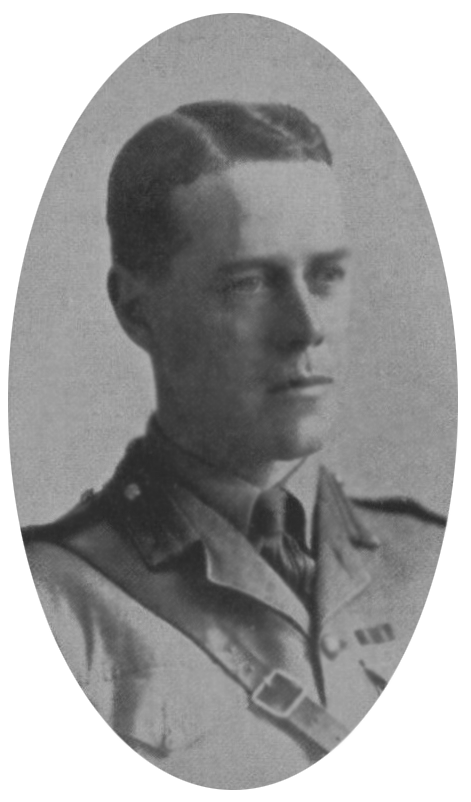
John Cawley (killed 1 September 1914)

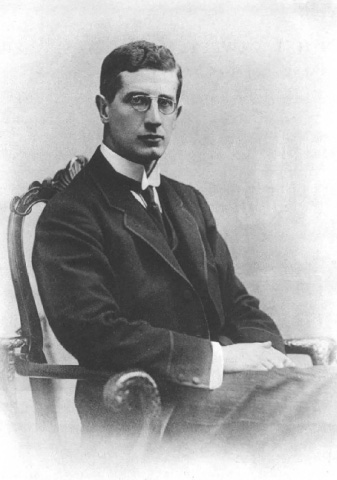
Harold Cawley (killed 23 September 1915)

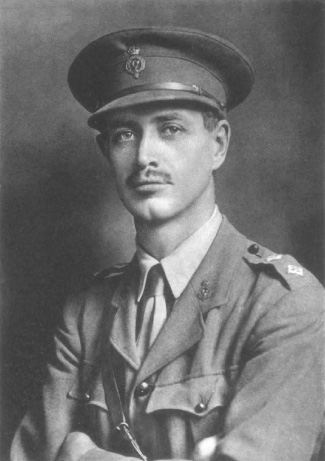
Oswald Cawley (killed 22 August 1918)

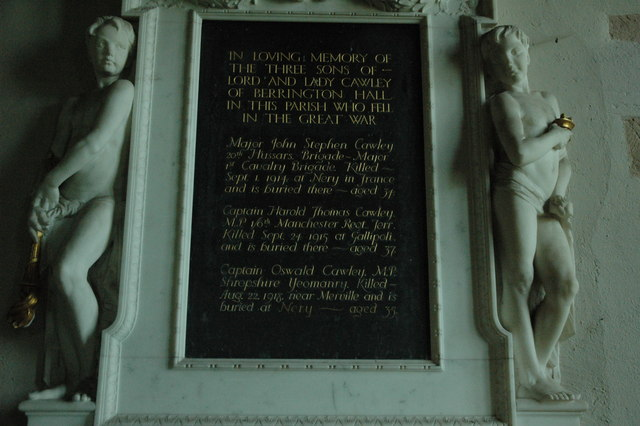
Memorial to the Cawley brothers in St Peter and St Paul, Eye, Herefordshire

== Arms ==
Coat of arms of Frederick Cawley, 1st Baron Cawley
Crest Upon a mount Vert a swan's head erased Argent between six bullrushes stalked and leaved three on either side Or. Escutcheon Sable three swans' heads erased Argent guttee de poix a chief arched Or thereon a rose Gules barbed and seeded Proper between two garbs Azure. Supporters On either side a swan wings surgeant tergiant Argent guttee de poix each standing upon a garb fesswise Or. Motto Cupio Credo Habeo (I Desire I Believe I Have)

Parliament of the United Kingdom
Preceded by Robert Mowbray	Member of Parliament for Prestwich; 1895–1918	Succeeded by Hon. Oswald Cawley
Political offices
Preceded by Thomas McKinnon Wood	Chancellor of the Duchy of Lancaster; 1916–1918	Succeeded by The Lord Beaverbrook
Peerage of the United Kingdom
New creation	Baron Cawley; 1918–1937	Succeeded by Robert Hugh Cawley
Baronetage of the United Kingdom
New creation	Baronet (of Prestwich); 1906–1937	Succeeded by Robert Cawley
