= January 1918 Prestwich by-election =

UK parliamentary by-election

The January 1918 Prestwich by-election was a by-election held on 31 January 1918 for the British House of Commons constituency of Prestwich in Lancashire.

== Vacancy ==
The election was caused by the elevation to the peerage of the sitting Liberal MP, Sir Frederick Cawley. Cawley had been Chancellor of the Duchy of Lancaster in the wartime coalition of David Lloyd George.

== Candidates ==
=== Government ===
The Liberals selected the Honourable Oswald Cawley, the youngest son of the sitting member. Cawley was a lieutenant in the Yeomanry serving in Palestine. Cawley’s candidacy was supported by the Unionists in Prestwich as they were part of the wartime coalition.

=== Cooperators ===
Cawley was opposed by Henry May for the newly formed Central Co-operative Parliamentary Representation Committee of which he was the secretary. May was also secretary of the International Cooperative Alliance. This was the first parliamentary by-election fought by the Co-operative Parliamentary Representation Committee. Although May was expected to gain the support of Labour voters, the Labour Party itself was unable to offer formal assistance because of the wartime electoral truce.

== Issues ==
For the government the principal issue was the continuing prosecution of the war and it sought the support of the voters for that end. There was a strong danger that Cawley’s election would be seen as inevitable, given his father’s position and former majority and as he was actively serving his country in the field. So the government supporters concentrated on organisation rather than policy to try to counter voter apathy.

May tried to appeal on the food question and by extolling the virtues of cooperation as the purest democratic movement and anticipating the triumph of the working –class once the war was over. May also argued that because Lt Cawley was serving abroad this amounted to a virtual disenfranchisement of the electors of the division.

== Result ==
Cawley held the seat for the Liberals by a large majority. It was estimated that of the approximately 26,000 electors on the register, which was now three years old, only about 16,000 remained eligible to vote. In the end the total poll was just over 10,000. Cawley only held the seat for a few months however as he was killed in action in France in August 1918.

Prestwich by-election, January 1918
Party	Candidate	Votes	%	±%
Liberal	Oswald Cawley	8,520	75.0	
Co-operative Party	Henry May	2,832	25.0	New
Majority		5,688	50.0	
Turnout		11,352	42.8	−36.5
Liberal hold		Swing		

== See also ==
- October 1918 Prestwich by-election
- List of United Kingdom by-elections (1900–1918)
