= Henry May (co-operative activist) =

British co-operative movement activist (1867–1939)

- Born: Henry John May; 16 July 1867; Plumstead, Kent, England
- Died: 19 November 1939 (aged 72); Eltham, London, England
- Political party: Co-operative Party
- Movement: Co-operative
- Spouse: Ada Martha

Henry John May (16 July 1867 – 19 November 1939) was a British co-operative movement activist and from 1913 to 1939 he was Secretary of the International Co-operative Alliance.

Born in Plumstead, Kent, May left school at thirteen to work at the Royal Arsenal Co-operative Society (RACS). He completed an engineering apprenticeship at the Royal Arsenal and joined the Amalgamated Society of Engineers, but after meeting Thomas Blandford, directed his spare time back to the RACS. He joined its board and became editor of its journal, Comradeship, then in 1898 was elected to the national board of the Co-operative Union. From 1905 until 1913, he was secretary of the Union's southern region, and in 1909 became secretary of the Co-operative Congress' Parliamentary Committee.

At the International Co-operative Alliance congress in 1913, May took the chair at the last minute, after its secretary, Hans Müller, became unwell. Shortly after, he was elected as the Alliance's secretary, holding the post until his death; in particular, he took the lead in maintaining contacts through World War I and convened a new international congress in 1921.

In 1917, he persuaded the Co-op Parliamentary Committee's members to constitute a Co-operative Parliamentary Representation Committee, for which he stood at the January 1918 Prestwich by-election as its first candidate, although he was not elected. He stood again for the committee, soon to be renamed the Co-operative Party, in Clackmannan and East Stirlingshire at the 1918 general election, but again missed out on election.

May served as the president of the Co-operative Congress in 1929, and also served on the National Peace Council, International Peace Campaign and attended the World Disarmament Conference.

May died of cancer on 19 November 1939 in Eltham, London, and was buried in Plumstead Cemetery.

Non-profit organization positions
Preceded by Hans Müller	Secretary of the International Co-operative Alliance; 1913 – 1939	Succeeded by Gertrude Polley
