= Brimfield, Herefordshire =

Village and civil parish in Herefordshire, England

Coordinates: 52.307°N 2.696°W

Brimfield
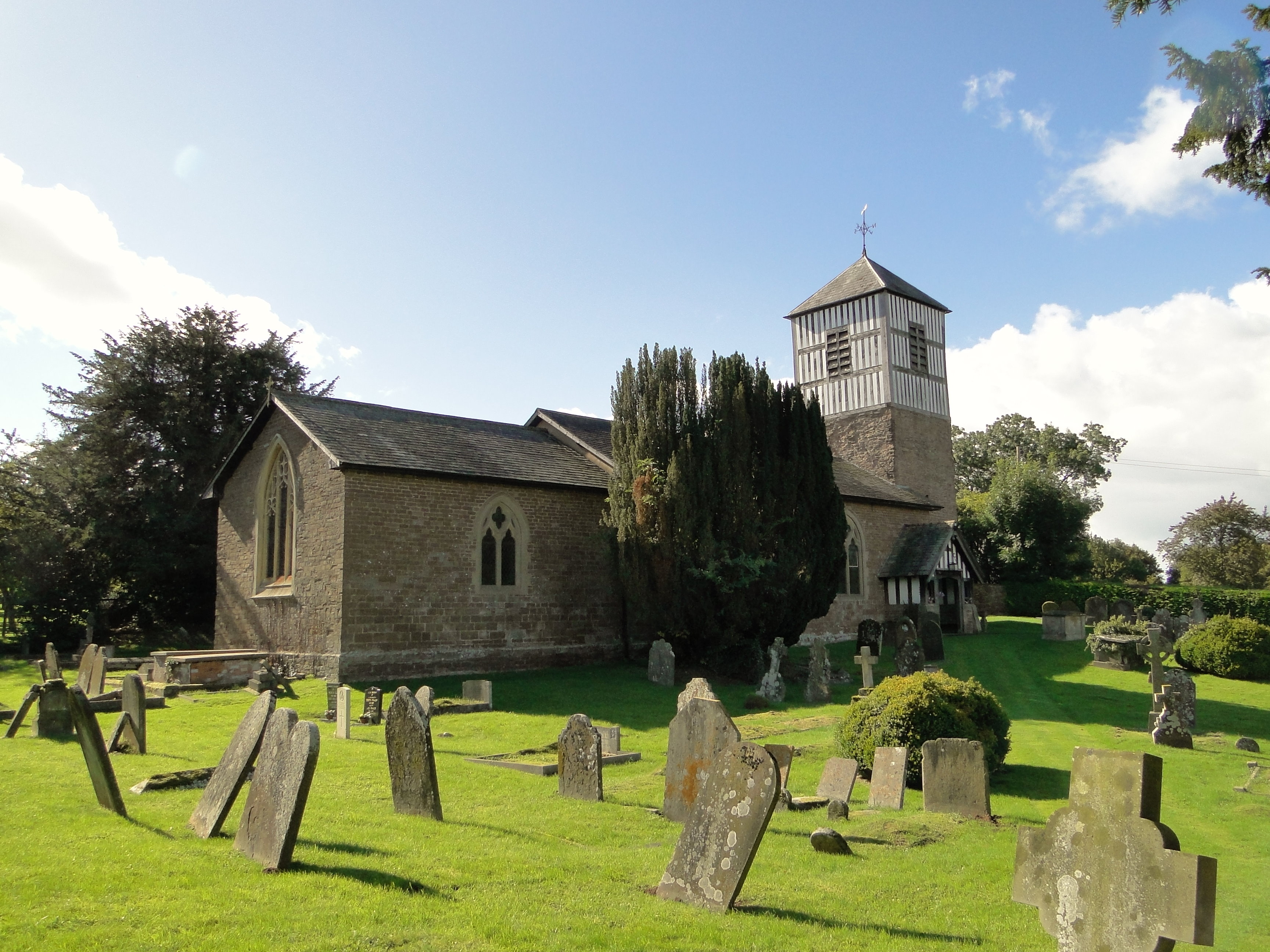
- St Michael's Parish Church

- Location within Herefordshire
- District: Herefordshire
- Shire county: Herefordshire
- Region: West Midlands
- Country: England
- Sovereign state: United Kingdom
- Post town: LUDLOW
- Postcode district: SY8
- Police: West Mercia
- Fire: Hereford and Worcester
- Ambulance: West Midlands
- UK Parliament: North Herefordshire

Brimfield is a village and civil parish in north Herefordshire, England. The village lies on the A49 road at the border with Shropshire.

To the south, near the hamlet of Ashton, excavations at the site of Ashton Castle have revealed traces of a large stone enclosure castle. Less than a mile to the north of this site are the earthwork remains of a medieval motte.

The parish has a pub called The Roebuck Inn.

Wyson is west of Brimfield and is part of its civil parish. To the north, in Shropshire, is Woofferton.

The A49 ran through the village until a by-pass was built in 1982–83; the A49 now passes to the west, between Brimfield and Wyson.

The village had a local store in its centre on Wyson Lane which served bread baked on site. The store was initially named A.A. Francis after Annie Amelia, later renamed R.R. Francis after her son Ronald Robert and then R. B. Francis after his son. The store closed and was sold to housing developers in 1996. Villagers later reinstated a local store annexed to The Roebuck which thrives today.

The village also had a local Post Office which ran for over 100 years out of a building next door to The Roebuck which has been carefully restored as a residential premise called The Old Post Office. The Post Office facility now runs out of the Village Hall.

These facilities and other various local landmarks such as The Foundry are depicted on a quilted display in the local church, St. Michael's.

A penny sweet shop was run by a Mrs Humphreys opposite St. Michael's Gate.

There is a vibrant local community offering many services in the Village Hall and support to inhabitants, including a long-running Grapevine newsletter.
