= Baron Cawley =

Title in the Peerage of the United Kingdom

Baron Cawley, of Prestwich in the County Palatine of Lancaster, is a title in the Peerage of the United Kingdom. It was created in 1918 for the Liberal politician Sir Frederick Cawley, 1st Baronet. He had previously represented Prestwich in the House of Commons and served as Chancellor of the Duchy of Lancaster from 1916 to 1918. Before his elevation to the peerage, Cawley had been created a baronet, of Prestwich in the County Palatine of Lancaster, in the Baronetage of the United Kingdom, in 1906. His grandson, the third Baron, notably served as Deputy Chairman of Committees in the House of Lords from 1958 to 1967. As of 2023 the titles are held by the latter's eldest son, the fourth Baron, who succeeded in 2001.

The Honourable Harold Thomas Cawley, second son of the first Baron, the Honourable Stephen Robert Cawley, second son of the second Baron, and the Honourable Oswald Cawley, fourth son of the first Baron, were all Liberal politicians.

The former seat was Berrington Hall, near Leominster in Herefordshire.

== Barons Cawley (1918) ==
- Frederick Cawley, 1st Baron Cawley (1850–1937)
- Robert Hugh Cawley, 2nd Baron Cawley (1877–1954)
- Frederick Lee Cawley, 3rd Baron Cawley (1913–2001)
- John Francis Cawley, 4th Baron Cawley (b. 1946)

The heir apparent is the present holder's son, the Hon. William Robert Harold Cawley (b. 1981).

== Arms ==
Coat of arms of Baron Cawley
Crest Upon a mount Vert a swan's head erased Argent between six bullrushes stalked and leaved three on either side Or. Escutcheon Sable three swans' heads erased Argent guttee de poix a chief arched Or thereon a rose Gules barbed and seeded Proper between two garbs Azure. Supporters On either side a swan wings surgeant tergiant Argent guttee de poix each standing upon a garb fesswise Or. Motto Cupio Credo Habeo (I Desire I Believe I Have)

Baronetage of the United Kingdom
Preceded by Morgan baronets	Cawley baronets of Prestwich; 1 December 1906	Succeeded by Channing baronets
