= Berrington and Eye railway station =

Former railway station in Herefordshire, England

Berrington and Eye
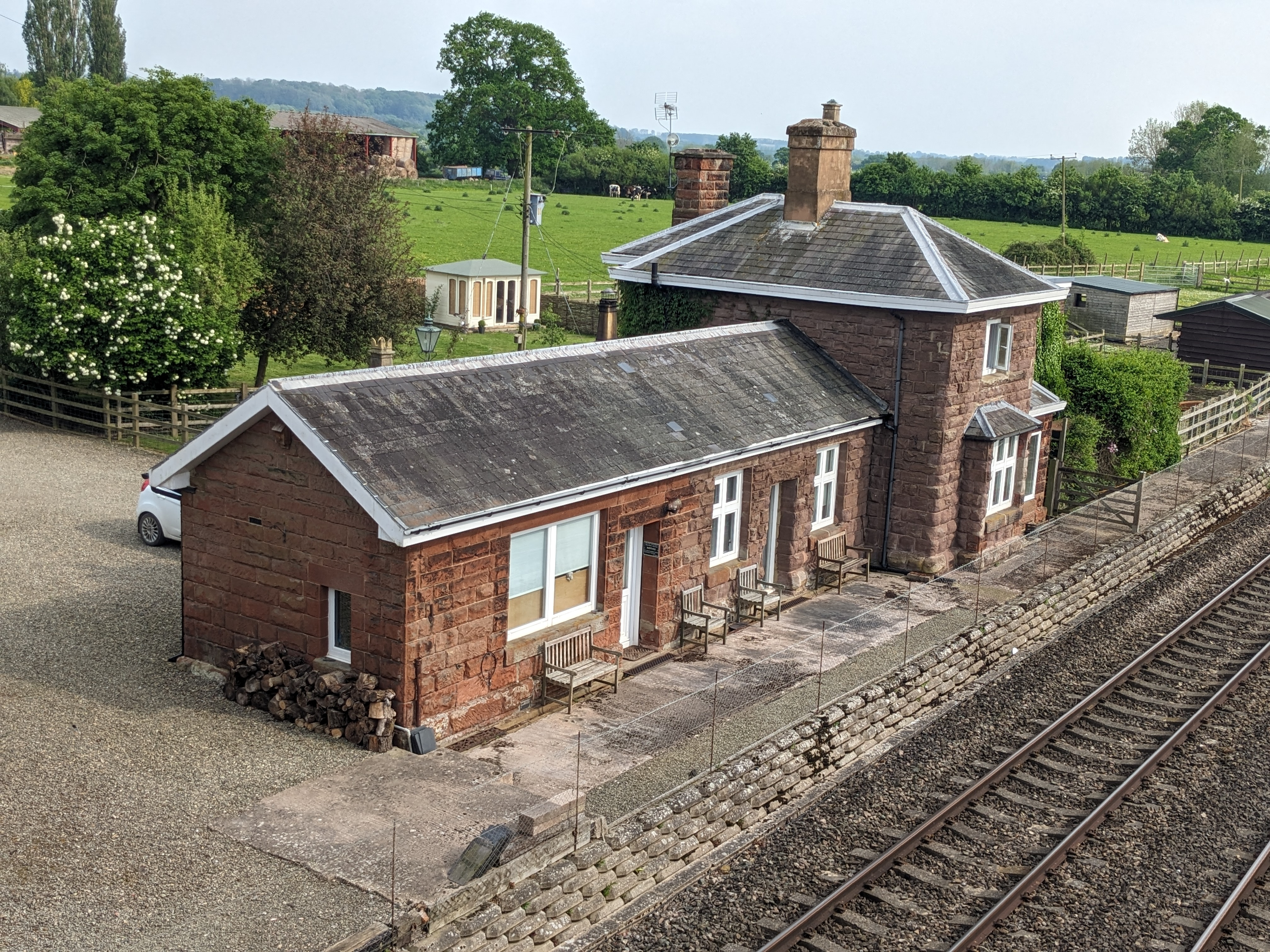
- Berrington and Eye railway station in 2024

General information
- Location: Eye, Herefordshire; England
- Coordinates: 52.2704°N 2.7431°W
- Grid reference: SO493638
- Platforms: 2

Other information
- Status: Disused

History
- Original company: Shrewsbury and Hereford Joint Railway

Key dates
- 6 December 1853: Station opened
- 9 June 1958: Station closed
Location

Berrington and Eye railway station was located in Eye, Herefordshire. It opened on 6 December 1853 and closed on 9 June 1958. The station was opened under the Shrewsbury and Hereford Joint Railway and closed under the auspices of the Western Region of British Railways. The former station is on the operating Welsh Marches Line.

Former Services

Preceding station	Disused railways	Following station
Leominster	Welsh Marches Line	Woofferton
