= October 1918 Prestwich by-election =

UK parliamentary by-election

The Prestwich by-election, 1918 was a parliamentary by-election held for the British House of Commons constituency of Prestwich on 28 October 1918. The seat had become vacant upon the death in action near Merville of the sitting Liberal MP, the Hon. Captain Oswald Cawley. Cawley had only held the seat since being election in a by-election in January of that year.

The Liberal candidate, Austin Hopkinson, was returned unopposed in support of the Coalition government of prime minister David Lloyd George.

Prestwich by-election, October 1918: Prestwich
Party	Candidate	Votes	%	±%
National Liberal	Austin Hopkinson	Unopposed	N/A	N/A
National Liberal hold		Swing	N/A	

== See also ==
- January 1918 Prestwich by-election
- List of United Kingdom by-elections (1900–1918)
