= Cathy Come Home =

1966 BBC television play

- The Wednesday Play episode
- Episode no.: Season 6 Episode 3
- Directed by: Ken Loach
- Written by: Jeremy Sandford
- Editing by: Roy Watts
- Original air date: 16 November 1966
- Running time: 77 minutes

"Cathy Come Home" is a 1966 BBC television play about homelessness. It was written by Jeremy Sandford, produced by Tony Garnett and directed by Ken Loach.

A 1998 Radio Times readers' poll voted it the "best single television drama" and a 2000 industry poll rated it as the second-best British television programme ever made. Filmed in a gritty, realistic drama documentary style, it was first broadcast on 16 November 1966 on BBC1. The play was shown in the BBC's The Wednesday Play anthology strand, which often tackled social issues.

== Plot ==
The play tells the story of a young couple, Cathy (played by Carol White) and Reg (Ray Brooks), and their descent into poverty and homelessness. At the start of the film, Cathy leaves her parents' overcrowded rural home and hitchhikes to the city, where she finds work and meets Reg, a well-paid lorry driver. They fall in love, marry and rent a modern flat in a building that does not allow children. Cathy soon becomes pregnant and must stop working, and Reg is injured on the job and becomes unemployed. The loss of income and birth of baby Sean force them to leave their flat, and they are unable to find another affordable place to live that permits children.

They move in with Reg's mother, until tensions develop between her and Cathy in the crowded flat. A kind elderly landlady, Mrs. Alley, rents to them for a while, during which time Cathy has another son, Stevie. Mrs. Alley even allows them to stay when they fall behind on the rent. However, she dies suddenly and an agent of her nephew and heir appears at the door demanding all the back rent, which they are unable to pay. Again Cathy and Reg go house hunting but are continually turned down as they can find nothing available that permits children. During this time Cathy gives birth to her third child, a girl they call Marlene. Their new landlord takes them to court and the judge rules against them. The family are evicted by bailiffs. The family then moves to a caravan parked in a camp where several other families are already living in caravans, but the local residents object to the camp and set it on fire, killing several children. Cathy, Reg and their children are forced into illegal squatting in a wrecked, abandoned building. They repeatedly try to get decent housing through the local council, but are not helped because of their many moves and the long list of other people also seeking housing assistance.

Cathy and Reg decide to separate temporarily so that Cathy and the children can move into an emergency homeless shelter where husbands are not allowed to stay. Reg leaves the area to seek employment. Cathy's loneliness and frustration finally boil over and she becomes belligerent with the shelter authorities, who are often cold and judgmental towards the women living in the shelter. Cathy's allotted time at the shelter expires while Reg is away, and she and her two remaining children (one having been sent to live with Reg's mother) have nowhere to go. They go to a railway station, where Cathy's children are taken away from her by social services.

== Cast ==
- Carol White as Cathy
- Ray Brooks as Reg
- Winifred Dennis as Mrs Ward
- Wally Patch as Grandad
- Adrienne Frame as Eileen
- Emmett Hennessy as Johnny
- Geoffrey Palmer as Property Agent
- Gabrielle Hamilton as Welfare Officer
- Phyllis Hickson as Mrs Alley
- Barry Jackson as Rent Collector
- Ruth Kettlewell as Judge
- Kathleen Broadhurst as Landlady
- Ron Pember as Mr. Jones
- Paddy Joyce as Mr. Acercamber
- Lennard Pearce as The Ratepayer
- Lila Kaye as a Matron
- Andria Lawrence as Inmate: Home Lea
- Tim Brooke-Taylor as a Wedding Guest
- Anne Haddy

== Production ==
The play was written by Jeremy Sandford, produced by Tony Garnett and directed by Ken Loach, who went on to become a major figure in British film. Loach employed a realistic documentary style, using predominantly 16 mm film on location, which contrasted with the vast amount of BBC drama of the time, the bulk of which was entirely shot in a television studio. Union regulations of the time forced about ten minutes of Cathy Come Home to be shot in this way, with the material shot in a studio on electronic cameras being telerecorded and spliced into the film as required.

The cinematographer was Tony Imi, whose innovative use of a hand-held camera to take moving action shots and close-ups gave Cathy Come Home almost a feel of a current affairs broadcast and a realism which was rare in British television drama at the time. This produced shots some traditionalists thought "not technically acceptable". Imi commented: "I was stuck in a rut after working on Dr Finlay's Casebook and Maigret – standard BBC productions. All of a sudden, with The Wednesday Play and Ken, there was a newness that fitted into the way I was thinking at the time."

Loach's naturalistic style helped to heighten the play's impact. Many scenes were improvised, and some include unknowing members of the public, such as the final scene in which Cathy's children are taken from her at a railway station (none of the passers-by intervened). Cathy's children were played by Carol White's real-life sons, and in his 2016 book The Day the Music Died: A Life Lived Behind the Lens, Garnett expressed reservations about this scene, saying, "Had upsetting Carol's children at the end of Cathy Come Home – by tearing them from her arms – been justifiable? I defend these scenes, but I know I am on thin ice." Loach himself called the scene "upsetting" to make, saying that the production "only had one shot at it really" due to not wanting to put the children through it multiple times.

The song that is played at the beginning and end of the film is a cover version of "500 Miles" by Sonny & Cher.

== Broadcast ==
After the first transmission in 1966, the play was repeated on BBC1 on 11 January 1967, 13 November 1968 and again on BBC2 on 11 August 1976. It was broadcast in the United States on National Educational Television (NET) on 28 March 1969, capitalizing on Carol White's international success in Poor Cow and I'll Never Forget What's'isname in 1967, and The Fixer in 1968. It was also screened by Channel 4 on 31 March 1993 as part of a season of programmes on homelessness, and by BBC Four in a season on the same subject in 2006. BBC Four also aired this drama on 5 and 11 June 2003 (shown as part of Time Shift). On 31 July 2016, it was repeated on BBC Four as part of a retrospective on 1966, and it was repeated again on BBC Four on 13 November 2016. In 2022, it was shown again on BBC Four as part of a retrospective on The Wednesday Play, then in May alongside an interview with Ken Loach.

== Reception ==
The play broached issues that were not then widely discussed in the popular media, such as homelessness, unemployment, and the rights of mothers to keep their own children. It was watched by 12 million people – a quarter of the British population at the time – on its first broadcast. Its hard-hitting subject matter and highly realistic documentary style, new to British television, created a huge impact on its audience.

One commentator called it "an ice-pick in the brain of all who saw it". The play produced a storm of phone calls to the BBC, and discussion in Parliament. For years afterwards, Carol White was stopped in the street by people pressing money into her hand, convinced she must be actually homeless.

In a 2000 poll of industry professionals conducted by the British Film Institute to determine the BFI TV 100 of the 20th century, Cathy Come Home was voted second (the highest-placed drama on the list), behind the comedy Fawlty Towers. In 2005, it was named by Broadcast as the UK's most influential TV programme of all time.

== Impact ==
In the light of public reaction to the film, and following a publicity campaign led by Willam Shearman and Iain Macleod highlighting the plight of the homeless, the charity Crisis was formed the following year in 1967.

By coincidence, another charity for the homeless, Shelter, was launched a few days after the first broadcast. Though it was not connected to the programme, "the film alerted the public, the media, and the government to the scale of the housing crisis, and Shelter gained many new supporters."

However, Ken Loach has said that despite the public outcry following the play, it had little practical effect in reducing homelessness other than changing rules so that homeless fathers could stay with their wives and children in hostels. Indeed, housing policy was reformed only over a decade later with the passing of the Housing (Homeless Persons) Act 1977.

== Home media ==
In 2003, the play was released on VHS and DVD by the British Film Institute with an audio commentary by Loach, and original production documentation (the BFI has screened the play on numerous occasions, including in a 2011 Ken Loach film festival). In 2011, the play was re-released on DVD by 2 Entertain with audio commentary by Loach. Along with other Loach films, it is available to watch on Loach's YouTube channel. It is also available as a special feature on the 2011 Criterion Blu-ray and DVD release of Kes, another Ken Loach film.

== Theatrical adaptation ==
To celebrate the 50th anniversary of the release of the film, a theatrical adaptation of Cathy Come Home was staged at the Barbican Theatre in 2016. It starred Elle Payne as Cathy and Denholm Spurr as Reg.
