= Mind Body Spirit Festival =

The Mind Body Spirit Festival is a festival that first took place at the Olympia Exhibition Centre in London in 1977. It was founded by Graham Wilson, together with Terry Ellis, and is now under the stewardship of Melvyn Carlile and Josh Roberts. The festival focused on topics such as religion, the paranormal, spirituality, natural healing, consciousness, and personal growth. The show returned to Olympia in 2015, and continues to focus on topics related to well being.

The Mind Body Spirit Festival was subsequently presented in New York City, Los Angeles, Cork, San Francisco, Sydney, and Melbourne, often using the Mind Body Spirit name and following the same formula of exhibitors, authors, and authorities giving lectures and workshops, as well as a mix of music and performances.

The Festival now incorporates The London Well being Festival in May and The Birmingham Well being Festival in November.

Exhibitors have included the Hare Krishna devotees, Neals Yard, Buddhist groups, astrologers, tarot readers, vegetarians, vegans, tai chi groups, the Anthroposophical Society, and yoga practitioners.
