= Golden Cockerel Press =

English fine press operating between 1920 and 1961

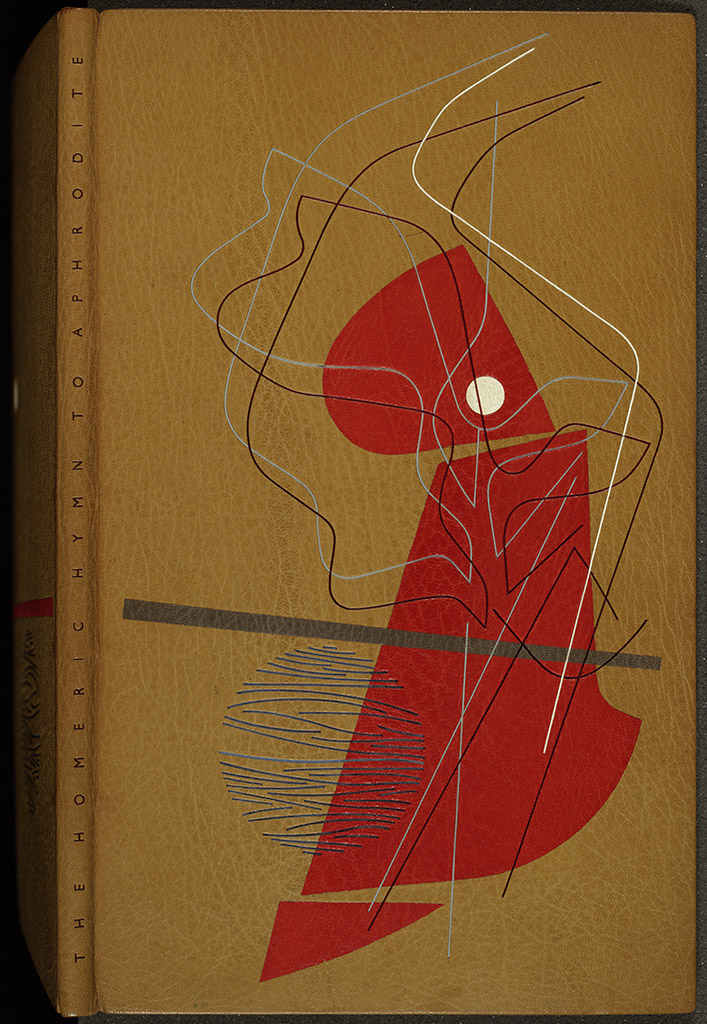
Cover of The Homeric Hymn to Aphrodite by F. L. Lucas (Golden Cockerel Press, 1948); an Edgar Mansfield binding

The Golden Cockerel Press was an English fine press operating between 1920 and 1961.

== History ==
The private press made handmade limited editions of classic works. The type was hand-set and the books were printed on handmade paper, and sometimes on vellum. A feature of Golden Cockerel books was the original illustrations, usually wood engravings, contributed by artists including Eric Gill, Robert Gibbings, Peter Claude Vaudrey Barker-Mill, John Buckland Wright, Blair Hughes-Stanton, Agnes Miller Parker, David Jones, Mark Severin, Dorothea Braby, Lettice Sandford, Gwenda Morgan, Mary Elizabeth Groom and Eric Ravilious.

== Hal Taylor's foundation (1920–1924) ==
The Golden Cockerel Press was founded by Harold (Hal) Midgley Taylor (1893–1925) in 1920 and was first in Waltham St Lawrence in Berkshire where he had unsuccessfully tried fruit farming. Taylor bought an army surplus hut and assembled it in Waltham St Lawrence as a combined workshop and living quarters. The Press was set up as a cooperative with four partners, Hal Taylor, Barbara Blackburn, Pran Pyper, and Ethelwynne (Gay) Stewart McDowall. In April 1920 Hal Taylor and Gay McDowall had married. The four initially lived at Taylor's mother's house in Beaconsfield and cycled daily to the hut in Waltham St Lawrence. It was Taylor who persuaded his family trust to provide most of the capital (approximately £2,800) for printing presses et al.

Their first prospectus proclaimed: "This press is a co-operative society for the printing and publishing of books. It is co-operative in the strictest sense. Its members are their own craftsmen, and will produce their books themselves in their own communal workshops without recourse to paid and irresponsible labour". Their first publications were The Voices, a literary review, and Adam & Eve & Pinch Me, short stories by a new author, A. E. Coppard, which was a critical success and sold well. Unfortunately the mood of idealism of the first prospectus did not last long. Proof-reading, for example, had been poor, which upset the authors. By summer 1921 Blackburn and Pyper had left and the co-operative became a more conventional private press when Frank Young, Albert Cooper and Harry Gibbs were employed. In 1923 the press published The Wedding Songs of Spenser with colour wood engravings by Ethelbert White, the first illustrated book from the press and a foretaste of editions to come.

When Hal Taylor suffered a recurrent bout of tuberculosis, Coppard took charge as a temporary manager. But then with Taylor's continued decline the business was put up for sale, early in 1924.

== Robert Gibbings period (1924–1933) ==
An artwork by Eric Gill for the Golden Cockerel's 1931 edition of the Gospels.

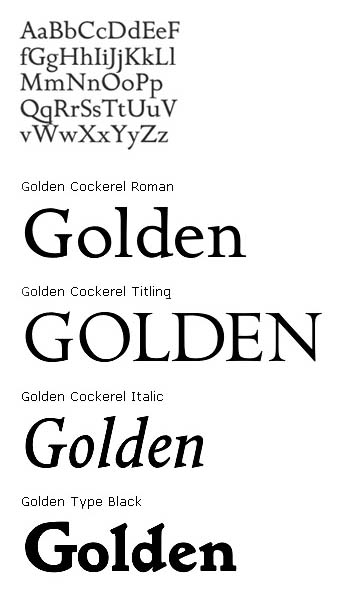
The Golden Cockerel typeface, designed for the press by Gill

Robert Gibbings was working on wood engravings for The Lives of Gallant Ladies at the time the press was put up for sale, and, to secure publication of this work, he sought a loan from a friend, Hubert Pike, a director of Bentley Motors, to buy the press. He took over in February 1924, paying £850 for the huts housing the business, the plant and goodwill. For the partially completed Gallant Ladies a further sum of £200 was paid. He also leased the house and land for £40 per annum. Gallant Ladies sold well with receipts of over £1,800, and saw the start of a golden period for the press.

The printing staff – Frank Young, Albert Cooper and Harry Gibbs – were skilled and capable of very fine work. Moira Gibbings helped her husband in the business, and Gibbings kept close links with Coppard. Gibbings knew all the leading wood engravers of the day (he was a founder member and leading light of the Society of Wood Engravers) and a number of authors, which enabled him to publish modern texts as well as classic ones.

The first book for which Gibbings was entirely responsible was Moral Maxims by Rochefoucauld (1924). Eric Gill was brought into the fold when he quarrelled with Hilary Pepler over the publication of Enid Clay's Sonnets and Verses (1925) and transferred the book to Gibbings. In 1925 he went on to commission engravings from John Nash, Noel Rooke, David Jones, John Farleigh and Mabel Annesley among others.

Gibbings published some 71 titles at the press and printed a number of books for others. The size of a run was normally between 250 and 750, and the books were mostly bound in leather by bookbinders Sangorski & Sutcliffe. The major titles were the four volume Canterbury Tales (1929 to 1931) and the Four Gospels (1931), both illustrated by Gill. Gibbings printed 15 copies of the Canterbury Tales on vellum, and 12 copies of the Four Gospels. Printing the Canterbury Tales dominated work at the press for two and a half years, and relatively few other books were printed during that period. However, the book was a considerable critical and financial success and grossed £14,000.

1931 saw the first appearance of the Golden Cockerel typeface, designed especially for the press by Gill. Its first use was in A. E. Coppard's The Hundredth Story.

The illustrations in some Golden Cockerel titles, although tame by modern standards, were considered risqué for the time and necessitated the press taking precautionary measures against possible prosecutions for obscenity or provocation, such as disguising the names of translators and illustrators. Gallant Ladies was mild in comparison with the Song of Songs (1925) and Procreant Hymn (1926), both illustrated fairly explicitly by Gill. The main defence of the press was that it was a private press, not a bookseller.

Sales were strong during most of this period. Gibbings had established links with a number of booksellers, notably Bumpus in London, and negotiated a very favourable deal with Random House. He bought out Pike with finance from another Irish friend, Mary Wiggin, and later bought her out, borrowing the money from Barclays Bank.

In the early 1930s, however, the business climate changed, and, as American sales faltered, the press struggled on as the depression became more severe. The press became moribund and Gibbings eventually sold up in 1933. The last book that he produced was Lord Adrian by Lord Dunsany (1933), illustrated with his own wood engravings.

== Christopher Sandford period (1933–1959) ==
The press was taken over by Christopher Sandford, Owen Rutter, and Francis J. Newbery. They paid £1,050 for the business. Gibbings had been in negotiations with Sandford for some time, and had introduced Rutter to him. Newbery was the manager of the Chiswick Press, where production was to be moved. The Golden Cockerel Press ceased to be a private press at this point, and became a publishing house. Sandford worked long hours on management, editing and design. Rutter solicited new books and edited some of them. Newbery's role as the printer was to oversee the production work at the Chiswick Press.

The first book published under the new regime was The House with the Apricot (1933) by H. E. Bates. It featured wood engravings by Agnes Miller Parker and had been planned by Gibbings. The first major book of the new regime was The Glory of Life (1934) by Llewelyn Powys, a large quarto with wood engravings by Gibbings.

The partners lost money on most of the books that they published, a fact that they had recognised when they bought the press. They were looking to the long term, and tried a number of strategies to strengthen their position, including offering to buy the Gregynog Press so that they could close it down and reduce the competition. The partners had to advance money from their private accounts to keep the press solvent. There had been tension between the three for some time and Anthony Sandford replaced Newbery as a partner. He had a much more commercial approach than his brother Christopher and Rutter, and expected a return on his investment. The press started to produce unlimited editions aimed at the Christmas market, but these too failed in terms of commercial success. Rutter wrote to Christopher Sandford: "We are publishing edition after edition of which more than half remains as stock". Anthony Sandford left as a partner in 1938.

In spite of all the problems caused by the advent of the Second World War there was one huge benefit for the press. People wanted books to read and by 1943 most of the Golden Cockerel stock, a growing liability, had been sold. In 1944 Rutter died but Sandford decided to carry on on his own; he had no financial need to seek a new partner, since the Chiswick Press, in which he had been a major shareholder, had been sold.

Sandford introduced colour illustrations, anathema to private press purists, and other means of reproducing illustrations instead of using original wood engravings – lithography and colour collotype.

Some 120 works were published during the Sandford era. One favourite illustrator was John Buckland Wright, another Clifford Webb, from whom he commissioned wood engravings for eight books. Sandford also commissioned Lettice Sandford, his wife, and artist Dorothea Braby, to work on multiple books produced by the press.

== Book editions Golden Cockerel Press of 1926 - 1952 years ==
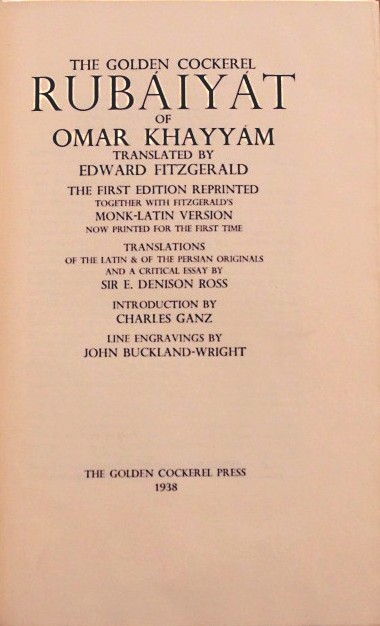

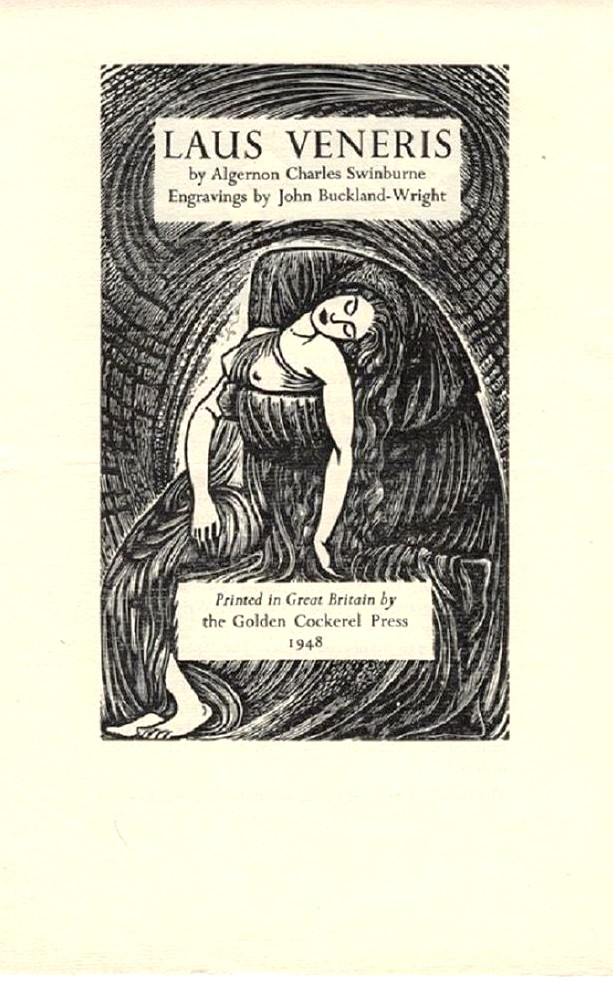

== Thomas Yoseloff period (1959–1961) ==
In 1959 Sandford, for whom the financial pressures of keeping the press going had become too much, sold the publishing business to Thomas Yoseloff, an American publisher and at the time director of University of Pennsylvania Press. Yoseloff completed the publication of two titles in 1960 that had been previously commissioned by Sandford, a translation by David Gwyn Williams of the poem "In Defence of Woman" (O Blaid Y Gwragedd) by the 16th century Welsh poet William Cynwal, illustrated by John Petts, and Poems and Sonnets of Shakespeare, edited by Gwyn Jones and illustrated by Buckland Wright. The following year, two more titles were issued under Yoseloff's direction, Folk Tales and Fairy Stories from India by Sudhin Ghose, and Moncrif's Cats, a translation by Reginald Bretnor of the 18th century French writer François-Augustin Paradis de Moncrif's 1727 work, Histoire des chats.

These were to be the last two Golden Cockerel Press titles to be published, however, as the continuation of the business soon proved impractical. By the end of 1961 Yoseloff wound up operations, as the resources and fine bookcraft skills necessary for production of Golden Cockerel titles had become too difficult and costly to obtain.
