= John Buckland Wright =

British illustrator and engraver (1897–1954)

- Born: 3 December 1897; Dunedin, New Zealand
- Died: 27 September 1954 (aged 56)
- Known for: Printmaking

John Buckland Wright (3 December 1897 – 27 September 1954) was a British printmaker, painter and draughtsman. He worked principally as an etcher and engraver, and was self-taught.

== Life and career ==
Buckland Wright was born on 3 December 1897 in Dunedin, New Zealand. He moved to England in 1908. Buckland Wright studied history at Oxford and then architecture in London. He soon realised that he wanted to be an artist more than an architect and by 1921 he was living in Belgium and was elected a member of the Gravure Originale Belge in 1925. He was also a member of Xylographes Belges, SWE and LG. During the 1930s, Buckland Wright lived and worked in Paris and frequently visited S W Hayter's Atelier 17. He had one-man shows in London and throughout the continent, sometimes signing his work J B W. His work is held by the Victoria and Albert Museum, the British Museum, the National Gallery of Art, the Museum of Modern Art, and many galleries and museums in Europe and America. His work was also part of the painting event in the art competition at the 1948 Summer Olympics.

He mentored Turkish artist and engraver Aliye Berger in the late 1940s when she moved to London and began to study engraving.

A master printmaker with an assured, swirling line, Buckland Wright passed on his skills after World War II when he taught at Camberwell School of Arts and Crafts, from 1948, and the Slade School of Fine Art, from 1953, the year that his book Etching and Engraving: Techniques and the Modern Trend was published. He illustrated over 50 books.

Buckland Wright died on 27 September 1954. There was a retrospective of his work at Blond Fine Art, in 1981.
