= Berrington Hall =

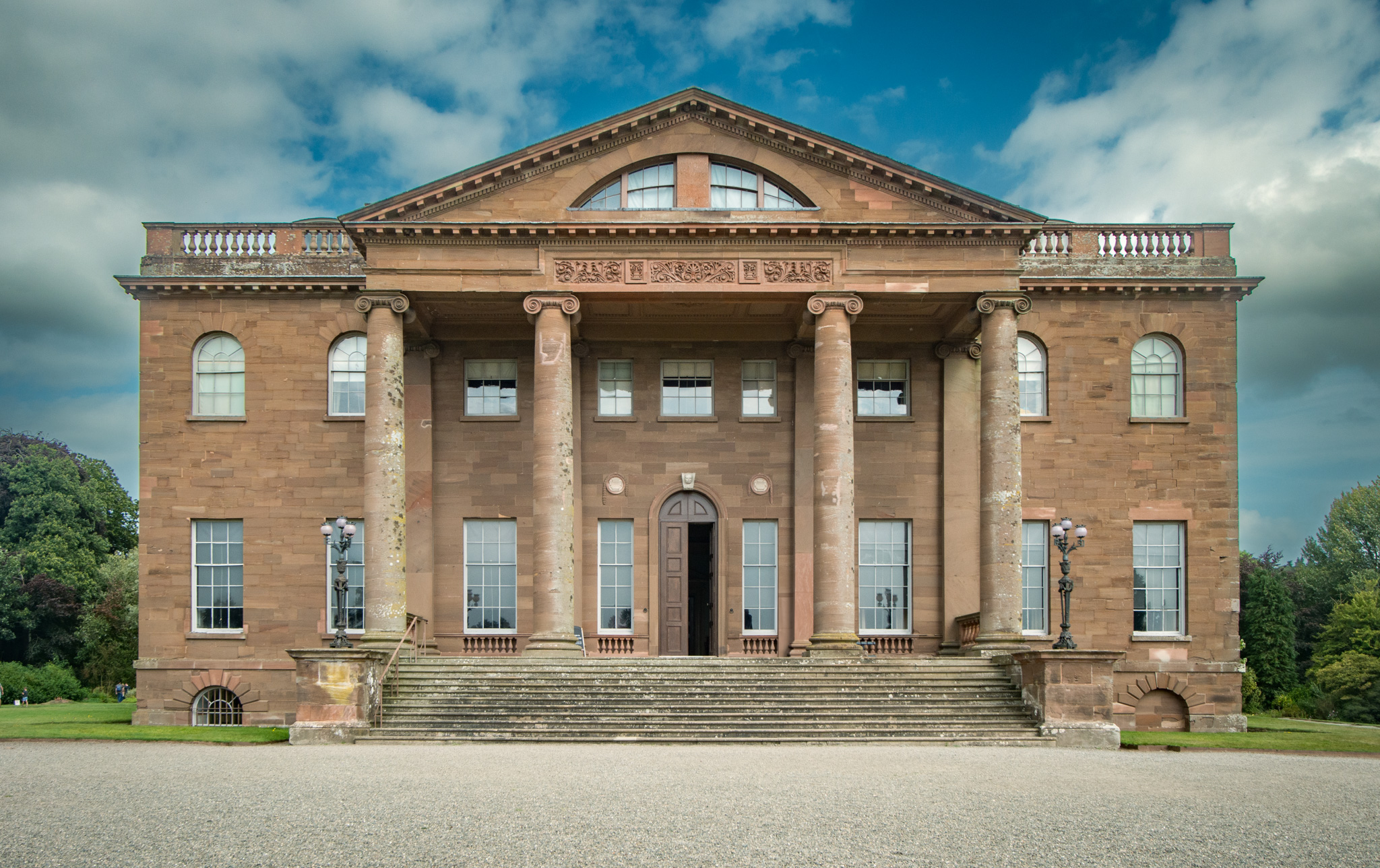
- Classical West front of Berrington Hall
- Interactive map of the Berrington Hall area

General information
- Type: House and Gardens
- Architectural style: neo-Palladian
- Location: Leominster, Herefordshire, England
- Coordinates: 52.2690°N 2.7214°W
- Construction started: 1778
- Completed: 1781
- Client: Thomas Harley
- Management: National Trust

Design and construction
- Architect: Henry Holland

Website
- www.nationaltrust.org.uk/berrington-hall

Berrington Hall is a country house located about 3 miles (5 km) north of Leominster, Herefordshire, England. During the 20th century it was the seat of the Cawley family.

It is a neoclassical country house building that Henry Holland designed in 1778-81 for Thomas Harley. It has a somewhat austere exterior, but the interiors are subtle and delicate. Berrington Hall is home to the Elmar Digby furniture collection, paintings by, among others, Thomas Luny (1759–1837), and the Charles Paget Wade costume collection from Snowshill, which can be viewed by appointment. The 'below stairs' areas and servants' quarters that are open to the public include a Victorian laundry and Georgian dairy. Berrington has been in the care of the National Trust since 1957 and is, along with its gardens, open to the public.

Berrington features Capability Brown's last landscape design. A notable feature is the ha-ha wall, which was subject to extensive renovation in the late 20th century by local craftsmen. Berrington Pool, a lake and island, is a Site of Special Scientific Interest.

== History ==
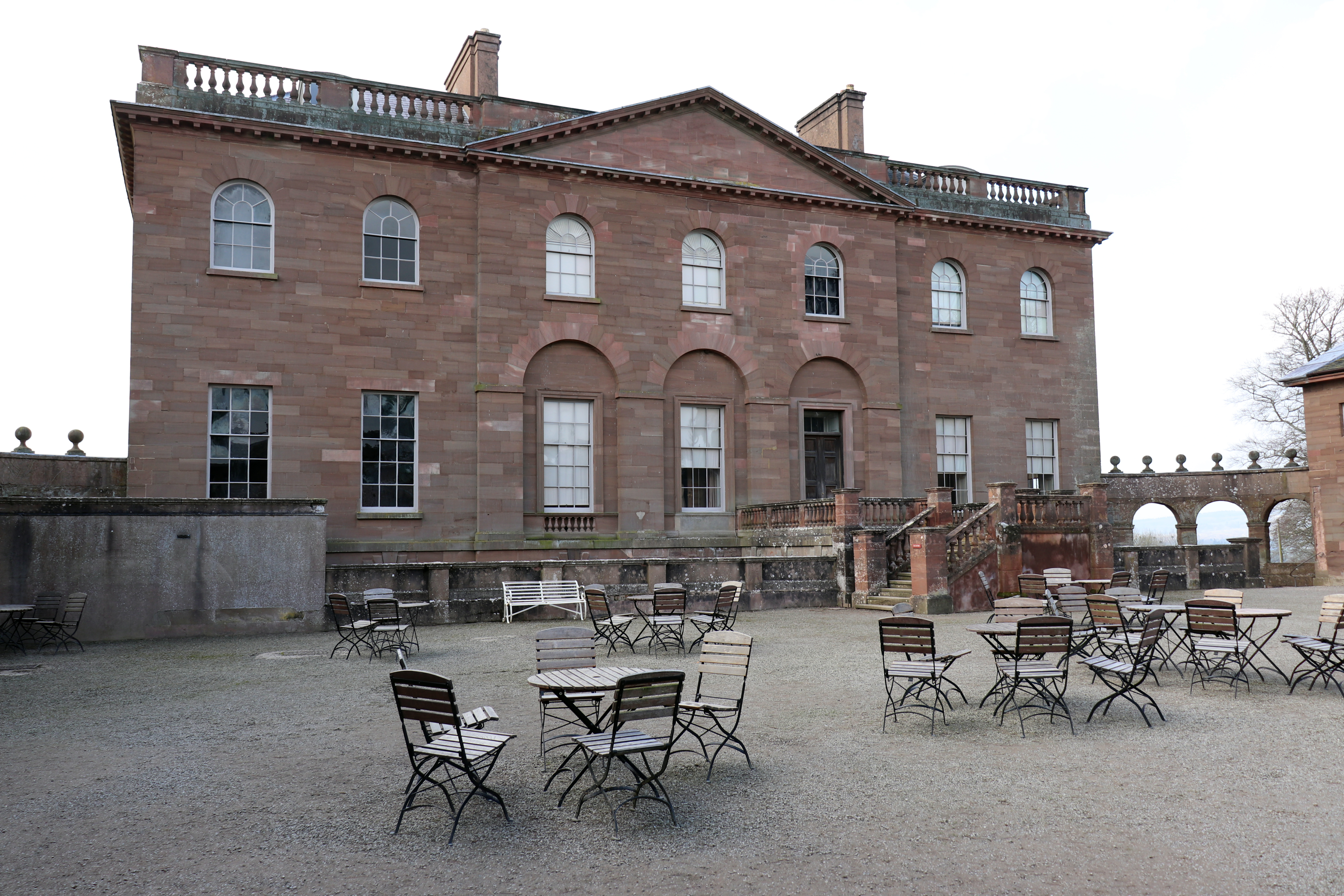
Courtyard at Berrington Hall

Berrington had been in the possession of the Cornewall family since 1386, but was sold in 1775 to Thomas Harley, a banker and government contractor who in 1767 had been Lord Mayor of London. He commissioned the rebuilding in 1778-1781 of the present Berrington Hall in place of the previous old house. He made it available to his daughter Anne and her new husband George Rodney, the son of Admiral Rodney. After Harley's death the house descended in the Rodney family for 95 years.

In 1901 the Manchester businessman Frederick Cawley MP, later Baron Cawley, purchased the estate from George Brydges Harley Dennett Rodney, 7th Baron Rodney. In 1957 Frederick Lee Cawley, 3rd Baron Cawley, transferred it to the Treasury, which passed it on to the National Trust. Lady Cawley was allowed to remain in occupation until her death in 1978.

It was classified as a Grade I listed building in 1959.
