= Anna Findlay =

British artist and printmaker (1885–1968)

- Born: 1885; Glasgow, Scotland
- Died: 1968 (aged 82–83)
- Education: Glasgow School of Art; Grosvenor School of Modern Art
- Known for: Painting, print-making

Anna R. Findlay (1885 – 1968) was a British artist and printmaker. She was known for her elegant colour linocut and woodcut prints of mostly outdoor scenes.

== Early life and education ==
Findlay was born in Glasgow, the daughter of Joseph Findlay and Jessie Brown Marshall Findlay. She studied at the Glasgow School of Art from 1912 to 1914. She studied under Claude Flight at the Grosvenor School of Modern Art and, for a period, her work was influenced by the style of the Futurists.

== Career ==
Findlay lived in Cornwall, where she exhibited with, and was a member of, the St Ives Society of Artists. "The oils of Anna R. Findlay have a distinctly modern note, and will be much appreciated by all who are inclined to encourage those who are straying from the orthodox in art and literature", commented critic "Penwithian" of her paintings in a 1936 show at Porthmeor.

By 1938, Findlay had returned to Scotland. She was also a member of, and exhibited with, the Glasgow Society of Artist Printers, which was founded in 1921, and the Glasgow Society of Lady Artists. In Scotland, she lived at Killearn in Stirlingshire and exhibited at the Royal Scottish Academy from 1926 to 1942, with the Royal Glasgow Institute of the Fine Arts and, on at least one occasion, with the Aberdeen Artists Society. Findlay also had exhibitions at the Redfern Gallery and at Manchester City Art Gallery. Her prints were part of a show at the Brooklyn Museum in 1934, alongside linocuts by Sybil Andrews, Cyril Power, Lill Tschudi, Ethel Spowers, Claude Flight, Eileen Mayo and others.

== Personal life ==
Findlay spent some years living with her brother James Marshall Findlay, an army officer, and his wife Cecile, at St Ives in Cornwall. Findlay died in 1968, in her eighties. The British Museum holds an example of her 1932 print, The paper mill. The Metropolitan Museum of Art holds Findlay's The Bridge. The Hunterian Museum and Art Gallery has Findlay's 1936 print, Back Gardens in Snow.
