= Barbara Taylor =

Barbara Taylor may refer to:

- Barbara Austin Taylor (1891–1951), British sculptor
- Barbara Taylor (historian) (born 1950), Canadian-born historian in the United Kingdom
- Barbara Ann Hackmann Taylor (1943–1967), homicide victim
- Barbara Nevins Taylor (active since 1974), American investigative journalist and journalism professor
- Barbara Brown Taylor (born 1951), American Episcopal priest, professor and theologian

== See also ==
- Barbara Taylor Bradford (1933–2024), British-American novelist
