= Gaze (surname) =

Gaze is a surname. Notable people with the surname include:

- Andrew Gaze (born 1965), Australian basketball player
- Christopher Gaze (born 1952), British voice actor
- Delia Gaze (born 1951), English art historian and freelance editor
- Gwen Gaze (1915–2010), Australian-American film actress, daughter of Leslie Gaze
- Harold Gaze (1885–1962), children's illustrator, brother of Leslie
- Heino Gaze (1908–1967), German composer
- Izzy Gaze (born 2004), New Zealand cricketer
- Kate Gaze (born 1990), Australian professional basketball player
- Lee Gaze (born 1975), lead guitarist of the Welsh alternative metal band Lostprophets
- Leslie Gaze (1880–1957), Australian singer in operetta
- Lindsay Gaze (born 1936), Australian basketball player and coach
- Sally Gaze (born 1969), British Anglican priest
- Sam Gaze (born 1995), New Zealand cross-country and road cyclist
- Tim Gaze (born 1953), Australian musician
- Tony Gaze (1920–2013), Australian World War II flying ace and racing driver
- Vera Gaze (1899–1954), Russian astronomer

== See also ==
- Bill Gazes, professional poker player
- Kristy Gazes (born 1967), professional poker player
- Patrick Gazé, Canadian film director and screenwriter
