= Adolfine Mary Ryland =

British sculptor, painter, and printmaker

- Born: 14 March 1903; Windsor, England
- Died: 1983 (aged 79–80)
- Education: Heatherley School of Fine Art; Grosvenor School of Modern Art
- Known for: Sculpture

Adolfine Mary Ryland (14 March 1903 – 1983) was a British artist who worked as a sculptor, painter and printmaker. Across several different media her work often displayed innovative elements of design and also showed her interest in Indian and Eastern forms of sculpture.

== Biography ==
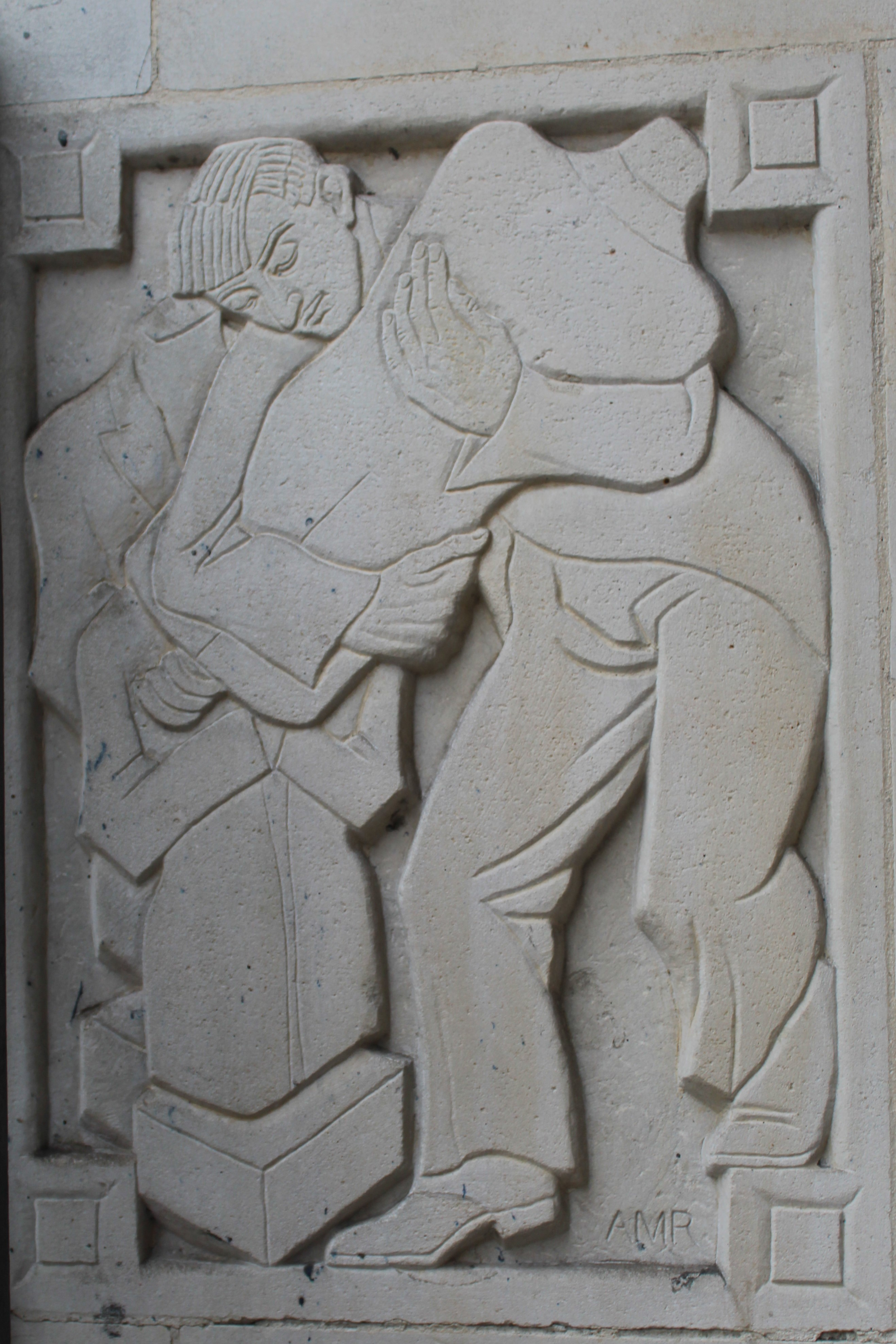
Sculpture panel at the former St Martin's School of Art by Ryland

Ryland was born in Windsor, where her father was a solicitor and where she would settle later in life. She studied at the Heatherley School of Fine Art from 1920 to 1925 and then at the Grosvenor School of Modern Art where she was taught linocut and woodcut techniques by Iain Macnab and Claude Flight. In 1927 she began exhibiting with the Women's International Art Club, WIAC, which became her main exhibition venue throughout her career. In 1936 Ryland became a member of WIAC and remained so for many years until the late 1950s. In 1931, she exhibited at the Ward and Albany Galleries and later at both the Wertheim and Bloomsbury Galleries.

During the 1930s, Ryland undertook a number of sculpture commissions and also worked for the London County Council, producing sculptured stonework panels for a number of public buildings. These included the School of Butchers building and, possibly her best known work, the panels surrounding the four entrance ways to the former St Martin's School of Art and College of Distributive Trades building on the Charing Cross Road in central London, which has been the Foyles bookshop since 2014. For the School of Art, Ryland produced two sets of sculptured low-relief stone panels, eight showing students and shop workers at work, for example at a sawing machine or unrolling a bolt of fabric, and four portraits of dramatic figures. Ryland worked on the panels from 1937 to 1939 and the following year the Tate acquired her 1933 sculpture panel Isaac Blesses Jacob, which displays her interest in Indian and Eastern forms, for its collection.

In 1987 the Michael Parkins Gallery hosted the exhibition Printmakers of the 20s and 30s and Adolfine Ryland which featured her prints and drawings plus two posters, Home from the Office and Out of the fog, into the sunshine which she had produced for London Underground. Ryland sometimes signed her work "Koncelik", which had been her mother's maiden name.
