= Colin Wyatt =

Colin Wyatt may refer to:

- Colin Wyatt (skier), British skier, artist, lepidopterist, author, photographer and thief
- Colin Wyatt (illustrator), British illustrator of children's comics
- Colin Wyatt (musician), American drummer and songwriter
