= Sybil Andrews =

English-Canadian artist (1898–1992)

- Andrews in 1918
- Born: Sybil Andrews; 19 April 1898; Bury St Edmunds, Suffolk, England
- Died: 21 December 1992 (aged 94); Campbell River, British Columbia, Canada
- Education: Heatherley School of Fine Art
- Known for: Linocut
- Movement: Modernism
- Spouse: Walter Morgan (m. 1943)

Sybil Andrews (19 April 1898 – 21 December 1992) was an English-Canadian artist who specialised in printmaking and is best known for her modernist linocuts.

== Life in England ==
Born in 1898 in Bury St Edmunds, Andrews was unable to go straight to art school after high school, since her family could not afford the tuition fees. Given the shortage of young men at home during the First World War, in 1916 she was apprenticed as a welder, working in the Bristol Welding Company's aeroplane factory, helping in the development of the first all-metal aeroplane. During this period, she took an art correspondence course. After the war, Andrews returned to Bury St Edmunds, where she was employed as an art teacher at Portland House School. Between 1922 and 1924 she attended the Heatherley School of Fine Art in London.

Andrews continued to practice art and met the architect Cyril Power, who became a mentor figure, and then her working partner until 1938. Between 1930 and 1938, Andrews and Power shared a studio in Hammersmith, where they developed a great collaboration, influencing each other and adopting similar printmaking techniques, especially linocut. The two produced a series of sports posters together, including posters promoting tennis at Wimbledon and the Epsom Derby for London Transport, under the joint signature of "Andrew Power."

With the beginning of the Second World War, Andrews returned to work as a welder, this time for the British Power Company, constructing warships. There she met Walter Morgan, whom she married in 1943. Seven wartime depictions of ships by Andrews are in the collection of the Royal Air Force Museum London.

In England, one of the largest collections in public ownership is held by St Edmundsbury Borough Council Heritage Service at Bury St Edmunds. This collection includes a number of early watercolours, executed while the artist was still living in Suffolk. Although Andrews had worked in other mediums – such as etchings, paintings, and monotypes – her main passion and interest remained linocuts from the late 1920s on.

== The Grosvenor School ==
In 1925, Andrews was employed by Iain Macnab as the first secretary of The Grosvenor School of Modern Art, where she also attended Claude Flight's linocutting classes. Around 1926 she began producing linocuts and one of her earliest prints Limehouse is in the British Museum Collection. Between 1928 and 1938 she exhibited linocuts extensively through shows organised by Flight.

In 1922, Andrews and Power moved to London. Three years later, the pair became part of the staff of the Grosvenor School of Modern Art – Power was appointed as one of the founding lecturers, while Andrews became the school's first secretary. Both Power and Andrews were swept up in Britain's linocut craze of the 1920s and 1930s under the tutelage of Claude Flight, instructor and champion of linocutting at the Grosvenor School. Flight, a proponent of the relatively new medium, believed that linocuts were most appropriate for expressing the modern age in which they lived, particularly because artists were able to move forward and stamp their own unique mark on the medium, free from the confines of tradition unlike the woodcuts based in historical Japanese methods. Likewise, Andrews quickly absorbed Flight's enthusiasm for linocutting and made it her life's work.

Andrews' contemporaries, fellow students of Claude Flight, include Swiss artist Lill Tschudi, and Australian artists Dorrit Black, Ethel Spowers, and Eveline Syme. The Grosvenor School style was influenced by elements of cubism, futurism and vorticism – capturing the machine age through dynamism and movement.

== Process and techniques ==
Michaelmas - Sybil Andrews (1935)

Unlike the laborious and difficult woodcutting technique, linocutting was prized for its simple tools and materials, making it economical and particularly appealing to Andrews – a woman of modest means. Following Flight's process, Andrews used ordinary household linoleum, gouges made from umbrella ribs, and a simple wooden spoon to rub against the paper during printing. The softness of linoleum prevented the cutting of fine lines, resulting in the bold shapes seen in Andrews's works. Alternately, Andrews often applied a technique of repetitive hatch-marks in order to create the impression of texture.

Flight's most technical achievement to the medium was abandoning the key-block, forcing his students to create structure with color. In this way, Andrews relies on three to five blocks (one per color) and common print inks applied with a simple roller in order to create her lively prints.

== Formal qualities and subjects ==
Andrews was influenced by the prevailing art movements of her time, predominantly Vorticism which had strong roots in England and Futurism which originated in Italy, by combining both styles she was able to reflect upon the fast-paced changes inherent to a modernizing society. Sharing Flight's fascination with motion, Andrews creates compositions which capture movement in all forms – human, animal, and mechanical. A recurring theme in Andrews's work is sport, from horse racing and jumping, to rowing crews, otter hunting, and speedway riders; through this, she conveys the exhilaration, speed and thrill of action. Andrews furthermore portrays the vibrancy found in typical English social imagery, which ranged from rural life, farmlands, manual work, and the various intricacies of city life. Additionally, during the 1930s, Andrews created seven linocuts based on the drama of the life of Christ.

Formally, Andrews’ works utilizes the principles of modernist design: simplified, geometric forms combined with vibrant, flat colors, and dramatic arrangements – suggesting the dynamism of modern life. Another common technique employed by Andrews is the retention of the paper, which functions as its own color resulting in sharp definition and high contrast between forms. Perhaps most significant is Andrews's staple device of a "centrifugal force-field," where elements of the composition rotate around a central point in order to create the illusion of movement.

== Exhibition history ==
Andrews regularly exhibited her work at the “Exhibitions of British Linocuts” – an annual exhibition organized by Claude Flight at the Redfern Gallery in London between 1929 and 1937. Flight arranged for these exhibitions to tour Britain and travel to other countries as far away as the United States, China, and Australia.

By 1945, the works of the Grosvenor School artists had lost their appeal and came to be considered “outdated” and “old-fashioned.” For almost four decades, the linocuts of Andrews and her contemporaries had been virtually forgotten. It was not until the 1970s–80s that Andrews was rediscovered in the art world, now being recognized as one of the Grosvenor School's best artists. Her print Speedway sold at Sotheby's auction for £85,000.00 – the most expensive print sold by a member of the Grosvenor School.

Interest in her work was revived in late 2019, when the Dulwich Picture Gallery in London hosted an exhibition of the works of the Grosvenor School from June to September, which included several examples of her prints. Approximately a month after it closed, an exhibition concentrating on wholly her works opened at the Glenbow Museum in Canada, which finished in January the next year.

== Life in Canada ==
In 1947, Andrews and Morgan moved to Canada and settled in Campbell River, British Columbia. Seeking a new life together after the depression of two world wars, Andrews and Morgan moved to a small cottage in the logging community on Vancouver Island where they made ends meet building and repairing boats. Rediscovered in the art world during the 1970s and 1980s, Andrews became a local celebrity and spent the rest of her life working, painting and teaching.

Sybil Andrews was elected to the Society of Canadian Painters, Etchers and Engravers in 1951 when her linocut Indian Dance was selected as the presentation print. In 1975, while working as a teacher and focusing on her practice, she completed one of her major works The Banner of St Edmund. It is hand embroidered in silks on linen and was first conceived, designed and begun in 1930. This banner now hangs in St Edmundsbury Cathedral, Bury St Edmunds, the town of her birth.

The Glenbow Museum in Canada holds copyright for Andrews's estate and houses the majority of her work with a collection of over 1000 examples, including the main body of her colour linocuts, original linoleum blocks, oil paintings and watercolour, drawings, drypoint etchings, sketchbooks, and personal papers. In recent years her works have sold extremely well at auction with record prices being achieved, primarily within Canada.

In 2015 an exhibition was held at the Art Gallery of Greater Victoria, Canada, A Study in Contrast: Sybil Andrews and Gwenda Morgan, comparing and contrasting fellow Grosvenor School artists. In 2017 her work was included in the exhibition, The Ornament of a House: Fifty Years of Collecting at the Burnaby Art Gallery. A full exhibition history is available in Sybil Andrews Linocuts.

== Collections ==
- National Gallery of Art, Washington, DC
- Art Gallery of Greater Victoria, British Columbia, Canada
- The Burnaby Art Gallery
- Glenbow Museum, Calgary, Alberta, Canada
- National Gallery of Canada
- Virtual Museum of Canada
- Victoria and Albert Museum, London, England
- Moyse's Hall Museum, Bury St Edmunds, Suffolk, UK
- Museum of New Zealand Te Papa Tongarewa, New Zealand
- Fine Arts Museums of San Francisco, USA
- The Bank of New York Mellon Collection, USA (Private Collection)
