= Margaret Barnard =

British painter (1898–1992)

Margaret Helen Barnard
- Born: Margaret Helen Barnard; 1898; Bengal, British India
- Died: 1992 (aged 93–94)
- Education: Grosvenor School of Modern Art Glasgow School of Art
- Known for: painting Linocut drawing

Margaret Helen Barnard (1898–1992) was a British painter and linocut maker.

Barnard was born in Bengal, where her father was serving with the Indian Police Force. At the age of seven she returned to Britain for her education, and went to Bath High School, and St. Leonard's Fife.

Barnard studied at The Glasgow School of Art from 1917 to 1923. She then moved to London, where she attended the Grosvenor School of Modern Art like her contemporary Sybil Andrews, studying under Claude Flight.

In 1924 she married artist Robert George Sang Mackechnie (1894-1975), who would join the British art group the Seven and Five Society in 1927.

The couple lived in Italy for several years, and later they moved to Rye.

During the Second World War she was an ambulance driver, cultivated an allotment and bred rabbits; she resumed painting after the end of the war, and continued to exhibit at the Royal Academy until her death.

In 1990 she made a bequest of her own works and her husband's, as well as their personal collection of works by other artists, to the Rye Art Gallery.

Barnard died in 1992.
