= Ethel Jackson Morris =

Australian illustrator

- Born: 1891; Victoria
- Died: 1985 (aged 93–94)
- Known for: Illustrator

Ethel Jackson Morris (1891–1985) was an Australian illustrator.

== Life ==
Morris was born in 1891, the daughter of James Jackson Morris of Victoria. She had at least two brothers who both fought in the First world war and returned home to work in the family business. Her family was well to do and owned several properties including a successful jersey cattle stud at Clarendon Eyre named after the family home in Malvern, and a property in Bulleen near the Yarra River.

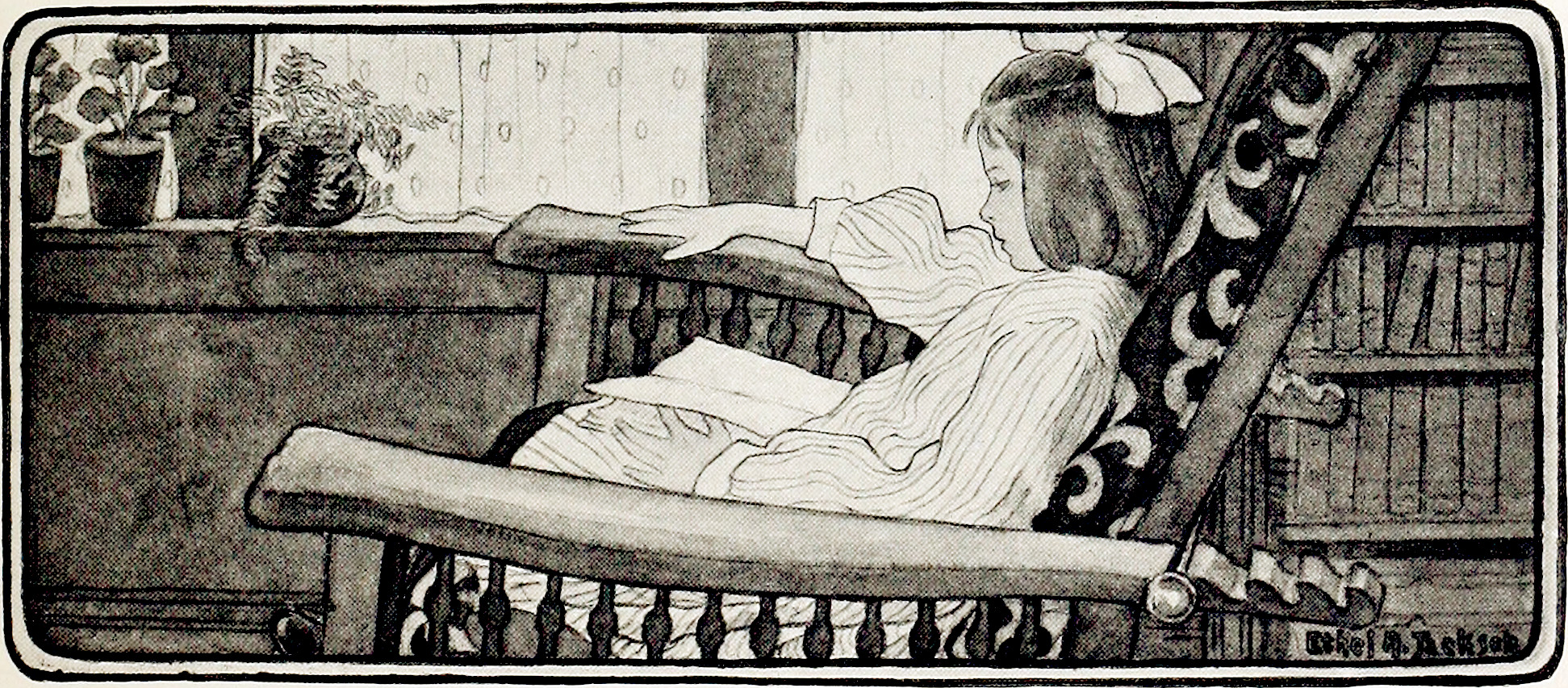
"“I Wonder Who the Forty-seventh Person Will Be!”" illustration by Ethel Jackson Morris in St. Nicholas, Vol. 32, No. 1 (1904)

With her family's support Jackson Morris attended the National Gallery School Art School, Melbourne from 1910 until 1920. During that time she illustrated works and exhibited with the Victorian Artists' Society. She worked alongside artists such as Harold Gaze and Ethel Spowers.

She published her first book for children in 1909 when she was just 17. In 1915 she contributed work to Dame Nellie Melba’s book of Australian art and literature. Her second book was released in 1921 and critically received. The same year she also held a solo exhibition at the Fine Art Society's Gallery.

In 1922 Jackson Morris travelled to Europe and studied in the Royal Academy of Art and visited Paris. It is believed this is when she met her future husband. She returned home and in 1923 settled in Sydney where in 1930 she married Captain John Overton.There is no further information about her life after she married.

== Bibliography ==
- All Among the Fairies (1909)
- The White Butterfly (1921)

== Sources ==
- Prints. "Ethel Jackson Morris". Australian Prints + Printmaking.
- "Ethel Jackson Morris, Hotel Cecil, Strand, London. WC1, to Clausen - Archives - RA Collection". Royal Academy of Arts. 29 June 1922a.
- "W. Montgomery, 81 Lisson Grove, Glenferries, Melbourne, Victoria, Australia, to Clausen - Archives - RA Collection". Royal Academy of Arts. 22 December 1922b.
- O'Conor, J. (2009). Bottersnikes and Other Lost Things: A Celebration of Australian Illustrated Children's Books. Miegunyah Press series. Melbourne University Publishing. ISBN 978-0-522-85651-4.
- "THE WHITE BUTTERFLY AND OTHER FAIRY TALES... ETHEL JACKSON MORRIS 1921 * - #540799017". Worthpoint.
- "State Library Victoria – Elves and fairies by Ethel Jackson Morris". Blogs. 12 September 2014.
- "[Original artworks by Ethel Jackson Morris] [art original]. - Version details". Trove.
- Only, Appointment. "The Fairy Dance by Ethel SPOWERS on Rare Illustrated Books". Rare Illustrated Books. Archived from the original on 13 November 2018.
- "Outhwaite, Ida Rentoul (1888–1960)". Encyclopedia.com. 25 June 1960.
- Bradford, Clare (3 August 2015). "The Return of the Fairy : Australian Medievalist Fantasy for the Young". Australian Literary Studies. ISSN 0004-9697.
- "The Sydney Morning Herald from Sydney, New South Wales on October 16, 1988 · Page 114". Newspapers.com. 16 October 1988.
- "Ethel Jackson Morris".
- "State Library of Victoria".
- "Table Talk (Melbourne, Vic. : 1885 - 1939) - 19 Aug 1915". Trove. 19 August 1915.
