= Mary Elizabeth Groom =

British artist (1903-1958)

- Born: 17 December 1903; Corringham, Essex
- Died: 21 December 1958 (aged 55); Norwich
- Education: Grosvenor School of Modern Art; The Brook Green School
- Known for: Book illustration and printmaking

Mary Elizabeth Groom (17 December 1903 – 21 December 1958) was a British artist, notable for her work as a printmaker and for the books she illustrated in the 1930s for the Golden Cockerel Press.

== Biography ==
Groom was born at Corringham in Essex to a master mariner and his wife. She studied under the influential printmaker Claude Flight at the Grosvenor School of Modern Art before, in 1921, enrolling at Leon Underwood's Brook Green School to develop her skills as an engraver. Groom's prints featured areas of black outlined in white but with great attention to detail. In 1937, she produced two books for the Golden Cockerel Press, an edition of Paradise Lost by Milton and Roses of Sharon, a collection of Old Testament verses.

Groom was a member of the Society of Wood Engravers, exhibiting some 18 prints with them, and also of a breakaway group, the English Wood Engraving Society.

For many years, she lived at Southwold before moving to Wenhaston in Suffolk, which was still her home when she died in 1958 in Norwich. Fourteen prints by Groom are held by the Ashmolean Museum in Oxford and both the Victoria and Albert Museum in London and the Auckland Art Gallery in New Zealand also have examples of her work, while the British Museum collection includes two of her prints.
