= Eveline Winifred Syme =

Australian painter (1888–1961)

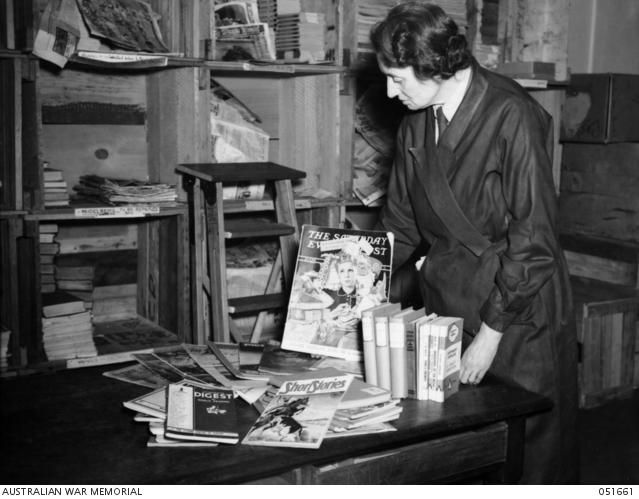
- Syme in 1943 at the Australian Red Cross Library
- Born: 26 October 1888; Thames Ditton, Surrey, England
- Died: 6 June 1961 (aged 72); Melbourne, Australia
- Movement: Modern art

Eveline Winifred Syme (26 October 1888 – 6 June 1961) was an Australian artist associated with the Grosvenor School of Modern Art, and an advocate for women's post-secondary education.

== Early life ==
Eveline Winifred Syme was born in Thames Ditton, Surrey, England, daughter of Joseph Cowen Syme and Laura Blair Syme. She was raised in Melbourne, where she was an early student of Melbourne Girls Grammar. Her father was a newspaper publisher in that city, as were her grandfather Ebenezer Syme (proprietor of The Age), and William Spowers, the father of her friend and colleague, Ethel Spowers. Eveline Syme returned to England to study classics at Newnham College, Cambridge, but women were not granted degrees from Cambridge in her time, so she went back to Melbourne to earn an education degree.

== Career ==
Syme studied art in Paris with M. Denis at La Grand Chaumiere in 1922/1923 and Melbourne, often in the company of Spowers. She had her first solo show in Melbourne in 1925, and another in 1928, showing works in various media, many of them watercolor landscape studies, though she also painted in oils and drew in pencil. She and Spowers enrolled at the Grosvenor School of Modern Art in 1929, to learn more about linocuts. They were joined here by Dorrit Black, studying linocut printing with Claude Flight.

By the following year Syme was back in Melbourne, exhibiting and speaking about modern printmaking. Along with Spowers she was associated with George Bell's "Contemporary Art Group." Late in life, she was on the executive committee of the National Gallery Society of Victoria.

Syme was also involved in efforts during the 1930s to build a women's college at the University of Melbourne. Eveline served as president of the University Women's College council in the 1940s.

Syme died in 1961, age 72. She was buried at Brighton Cemetery. Eveline was a founding member of the University Women's College at the University of Melbourne. In 1953 the Syme Wing, named after founders and benefactors, sisters, Misses Eveline and Kathleen Syme was opened. She left much of her estate to the University Women's College.
