= Rachel Reckitt =

British wood engraver and sculptor (1908-1995)

- Born: 1908; St Albans, England
- Died: 1995 (aged 86–87)
- Education: Taunton School of Art; Grosvenor School of Modern Art; Hammersmith School of Building Crafts; Central School of Art and Design
- Known for: Sculpture, painting, wood engraving
- Relatives: Penelope Lively (niece)

Rachel Reckitt (1908–1995) was a British artist, who in a long career worked as a wood engraver, as a sculptor and as a designer of wrought iron work. Her output included book illustrations, tombstones, church sculptures and pub signs.

== Biography ==
Reckitt was born and lived in St Albans in Hertfordshire until 1922 when her family moved to Old Cleeve in Somerset to live in a large country house known as Golsoncott.

After a spell at the Taunton School of Art, Reckitt studied wood engraving at the Grosvenor School of Modern Art in London from 1933 to 1937, where she was taught by Iain Macnab. During this period she began exhibiting stone and wood carvings with the London Group and also prints with the Society of Wood Engravers. In 1937 she began making sculptured inn signs using metal sheeting and other materials for pubs in Somerset. During World War II Reckitt undertook relief work in the Whitechapel area of London and also assisted with the evacuation of children from the city to Golsoncott. After the war she studied sculpture at the Hammersmith School of Building Crafts for five years and also studied lithography at the Central School of Art and Design.

Throughout the 1960s Reckitt created sculptures in wood and stone, often in a modern, constructivist style. From 1970 to 1975 Reckitt studied welding and was taught how to work with wrought iron by Harry and Jim Horrobin, at the Roadwater Smithy in Somerset. From then on she would produce sculptures and other pieces in steel and metal from her west Somerset home at Rodhuish. Among the most notable pieces from this period is her Jacob Wrestling with the Angel in wrought iron and aluminium which is in St Bartholomew's Church in Rodhuish. Several parish churches in the area around Golsoncott have examples of Reckitt's work either as sculptures, altar screens or painted pulpits.

Reckitt was a member of the Society of Wood Engravers, the British Artist Blacksmiths' Association and an honorary member of the Somerset Guild of Craftsmen. She had solo exhibitions at the Bridgwater Arts Centre and at Duncan Campbell Contemporary Art. The British Museum holds several of her prints. In 2001 a retrospective touring exhibition was mounted by the Somerset County Museums Service which was accompanied by the book Rachel Reckitt: where everything that meets the eye. A private exhibition of her studio works was held at Crowcombe Church House in 2011 which featured her metalwork and later associated paintings and drawings. The author Penelope Lively was Reckitt's niece and accounts of her appear in Lively's memoirs Oleander Jacaranda and A House Unlocked. After Reckitt's death Golsoncott was sold and the funds raised were used to create the Golsoncott Foundation to support the arts and in her memory. The Foundation provided support for another exhibition of Reckitt’s work at the Museum of Somerset in 2024 and 2025.

== Books illustrated ==
Books illustrated by Reckitt include,

- Voices on the Green by ARJ Wise & RA Smith, (Joseph), 1945
- London, South of the River by SP Myers, (Elek, Visions of England series), 1949
- English Country Short Stories by Walter de la Mare, (Elek), 1949
- People with Six Legs by M Bosanquet, (Faber and Faber), 1953
- Seven Psalms, (Skelton's Press), 1981.
