= English Mediæval Architecture =

1912 book from Cyril Edward Power

- Title page for English Mediæval Architecture (1912)
- Author: Cyril Edward Power
- Language: English
- Publisher: Talbot Press
- Publication date: 1912
- OCLC: 504716848
- Text: English Mediæval Architecture online

English mediæval architecture is a book published in three volumes in 1912, re-published in two volumes in 1921 and one volume in 1931, by architect and artist Cyril Edward Power. It features 424 of his drawings and illustrations and was published by Talbot Press.

On 5 July 1912, Building News magazine stated: "While the ordinary reader will scan the book with pleasurable interest, the architectural student of Mediaeval architecture who believes - some still believe it, we suppose even in these days - that structural integrity was the raison d'être of Gothic art, will follow Mr Power's intelligent exposition with profit, and find stimulation to further study."

Power states that the purpose of the book is to "make the various stages of early life in these islands intelligible."

These books were the outcome of a series of lectures Power gave in 1907 at Goldsmiths College New Cross. The books were renowned for their intricate detail and exhaustive research. Shortly after their publication, Powers began lecturing in architecture at The Grosvenor School of Modern Art.
