= Ethel Spowers =

Australian artist (1890–1947)

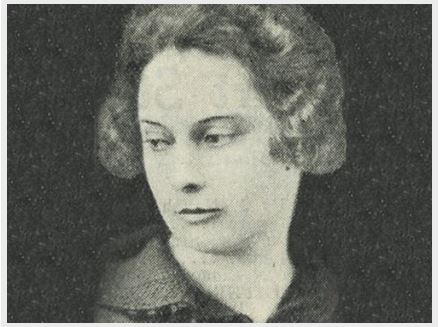
- Born: Ethel Louise Spowers; 11 June 1890; South Yarra, Melbourne, Australia
- Died: 5 May 1947 (aged 56)
- Education: National Gallery Art School, Melbourne; Grosvenor School of Modern Art, London
- Notable work: Wet Afternoon (1930)
- Style: Grosvenor School (linocut sub-category)
- Movement: Modernism

Ethel Louise Spowers (11 July 1890 – 5 May 1947) was an Australian artist associated with the Grosvenor School of Modern Art in London. She was especially known for her linocuts, which are included in the collections of major Australian and British Art Galleries. She was also a founder of the Contemporary Art Society, promoting modern art in Australia.

== Early life ==
Ethel Louise Spowers was born on 11 July 1890, in South Yarra, Melbourne, daughter of a New Zealand father and a London-born mother. Her father, William Spowers, owned a newspaper. Spowers trained as an artist at the National Gallery of Victoria Art School 1911-17, as well as in Paris with André Lhote. She was educated at Melbourne Girls Grammar School in Melbourne. Wealthy and cultured, her family owned a mansion in St Georges Road, Toorak. Ethel continued to live there as an adult and maintained a studio above the stables.

== Career ==
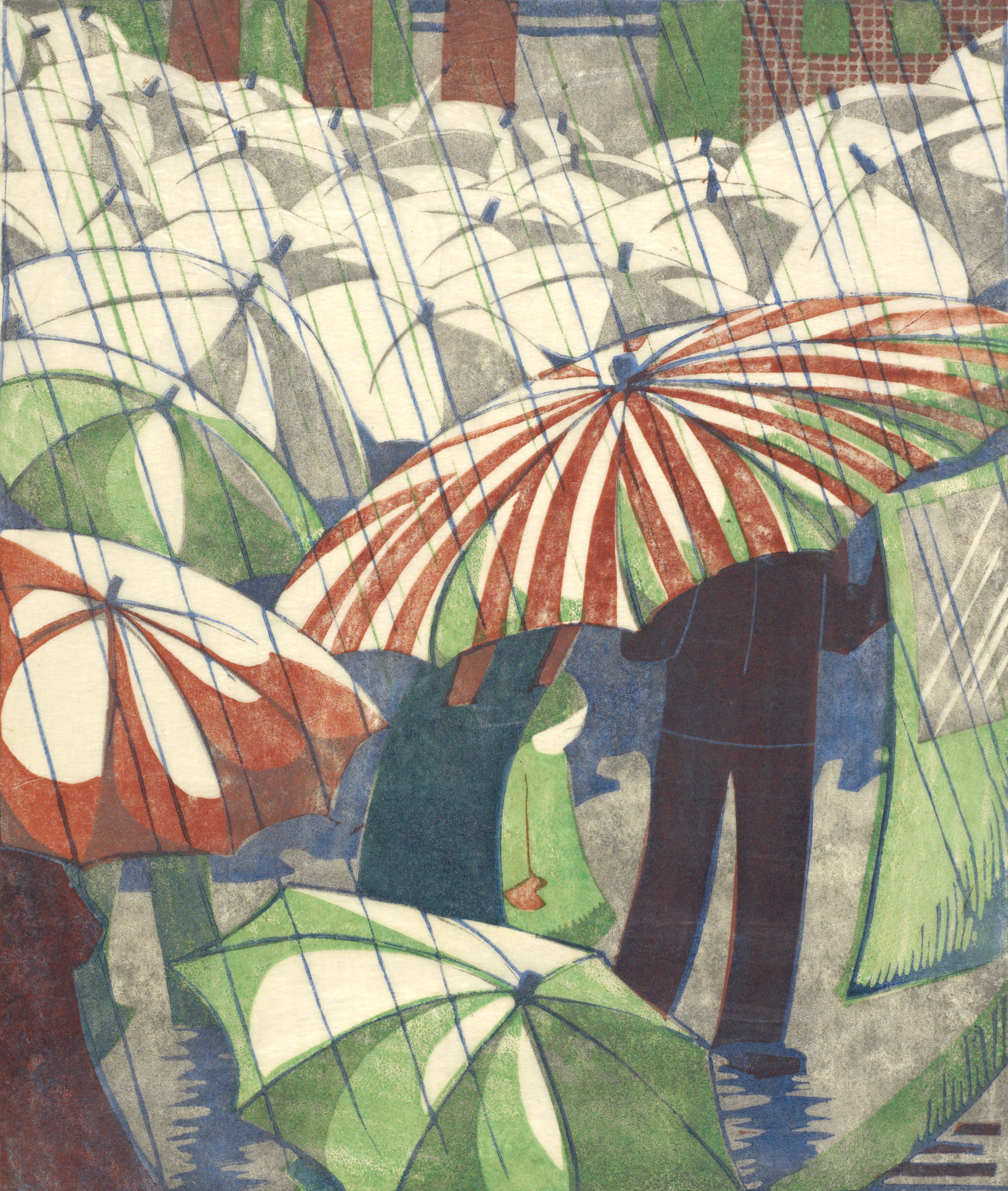
Wet Afternoon, linocut in four colour blocks, 1930

Spowers had her first solo exhibit in Melbourne at age 30, showing fairy-tale illustrations as those of Ethel Jackson Morris. Two further solo shows (1925 and 1927) at the New Gallery, Melbourne, confirmed her reputation as an illustrator of fairy tales, though by then she was also producing woodcuts and linocuts inspired by Japanese art and covering a broader range of subjects.

Her style and artistic focus changed in 1928–29 when she studied linocut printmaking with Claude Flight at the Grosvenor School of Modern Art in London. She was one of several Australian women artists at the Grosvenor School, including Dorrit Black and Eveline Winifred Syme. Further classes followed in 1931, during which Spowers absorbed modernist ideas of rhythmic design and composition from the principal of Grosvenor School Iain Macnab.

In the 1930s her linocuts attracted critical attention for their bold, simplified forms, rhythmic sense of movement, distinctive use of colour and humorous observation of everyday life, particularly the world of children. They were regularly shown at The Redfern Gallery, London.

Spowers mounted an exhibition of Australian linocuts in Melbourne in 1930. In 1932, she became a founder of the Contemporary Art Society, promoting modern art in Australia.

== Selected works ==
- Yallourn (1933)
- Bank holiday (1935)
- Resting models (1933)
- Wet afternoon (1930)
- Gust of Wind (1931)
- Bank Holiday (1935)

== Death and legacy ==
Spowers died at age 56 in Melbourne on 5 May 1947 following a long battle with cancer. She was buried at Fawkner Memorial Park. A children's book illustrated by Spowers, Cuthbert and the Dogs, was published the year after her death. Spowers apparently destroyed some of her original works late in life. In 2011, Ethel Spowers' Wet Afternoon sold in New York City for £51,650, much higher than any of her previous works had brought at auction. The next year, Spowers' The Gust of Wind more than doubled that mark, selling for £114,050 in April 2012, a record price for any Grosvenor School print up to that date.

The Art Gallery NSW holds several of her works, some from an early period of realistic illustrations, others showing the marked influence of her time at the Grosvenor School. The National Gallery of Australia holds 47 of her prints executed in the 1920s and 1930s. Her prints are also held in the National Gallery of Victoria and the Ballarat Fine Art Gallery, Victoria. The British Museum and the Victoria and Albert Museum purchased a number of her linocuts.

== Gallery ==
=== Watercolor on paper ===
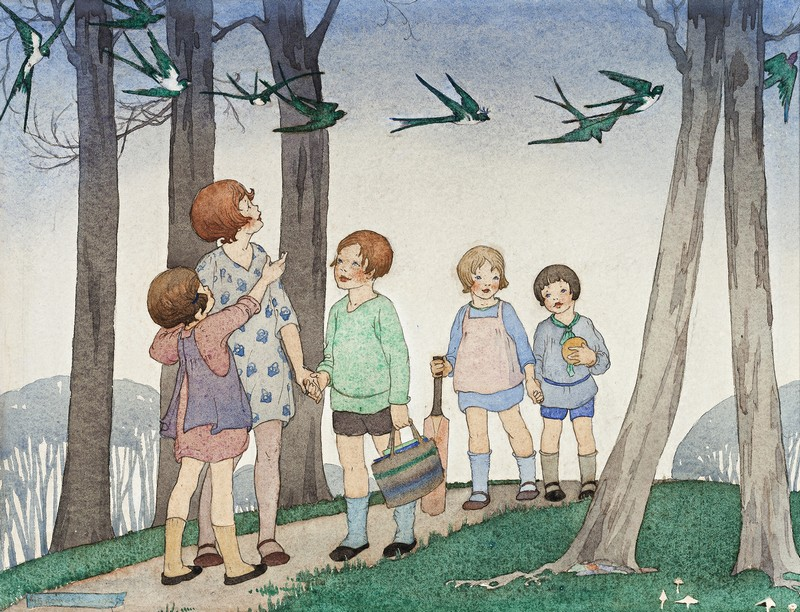
The Enchanted Birds (1927)

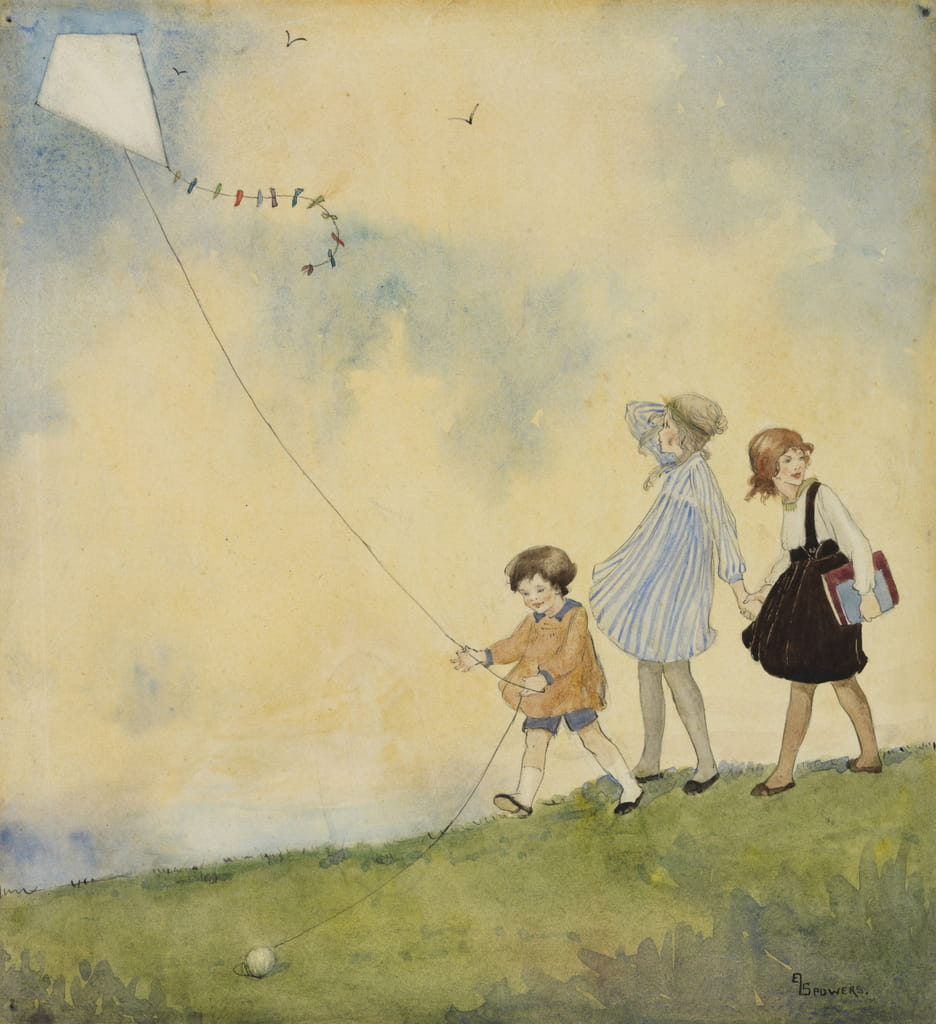
The Kite Art Gallery of New South Wales, Sydney

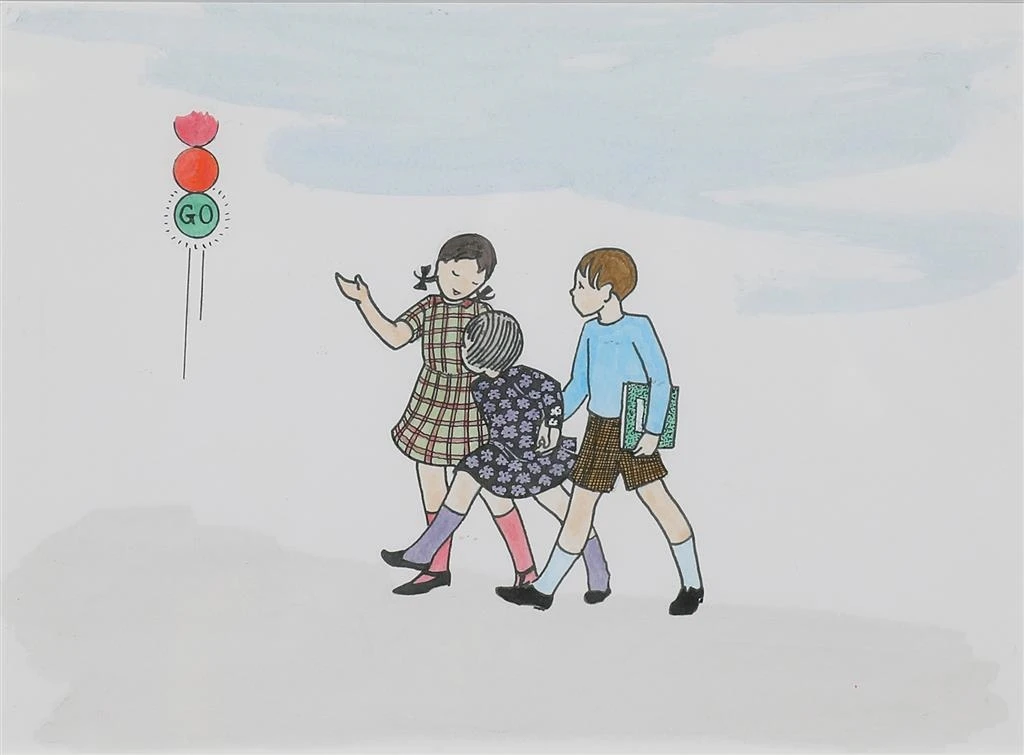
Children walking (ink & watercolour)

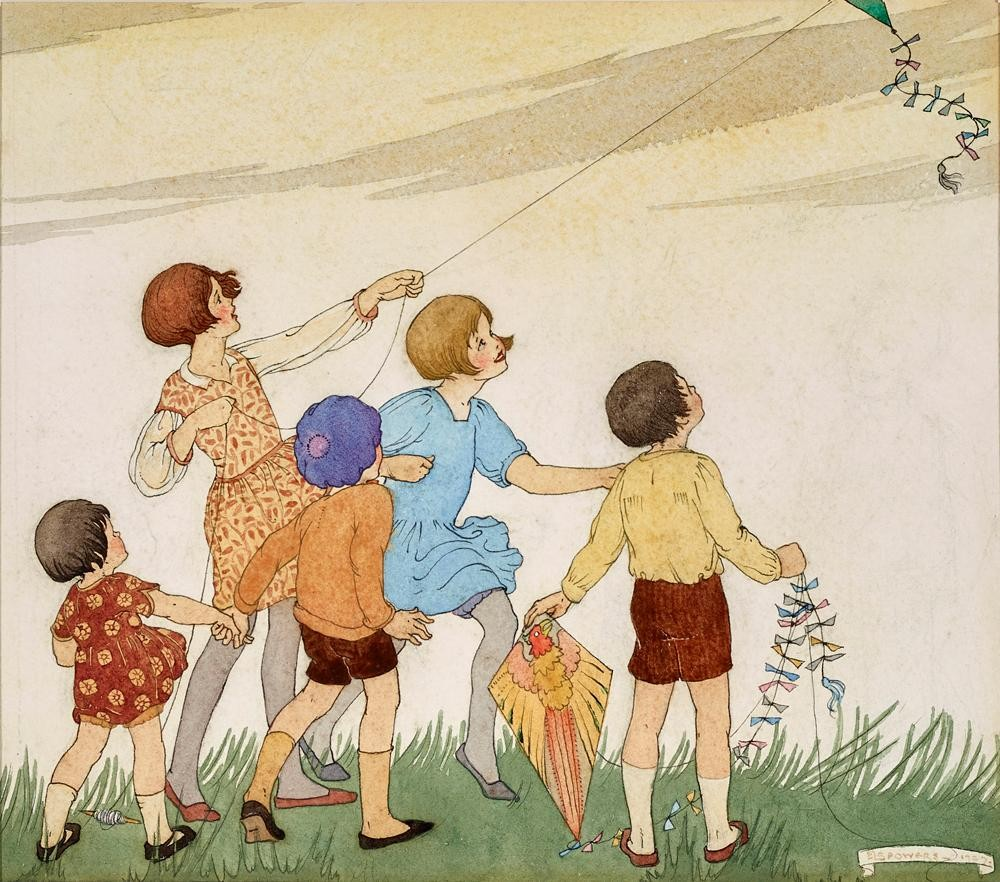
The Kite Fyers (1927)

=== Linocuts ===
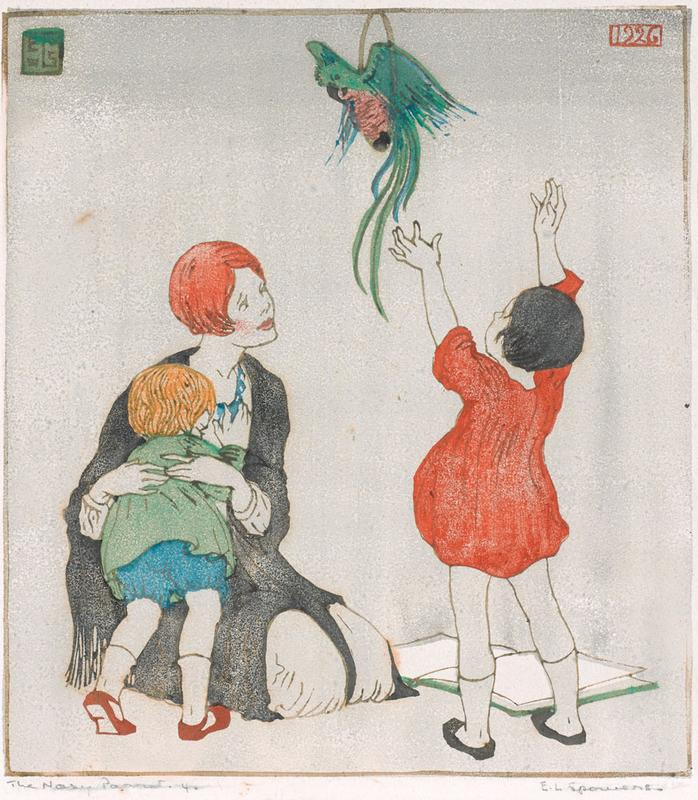
Ethel Spowers, The Noisy Parrot, c. 1926.

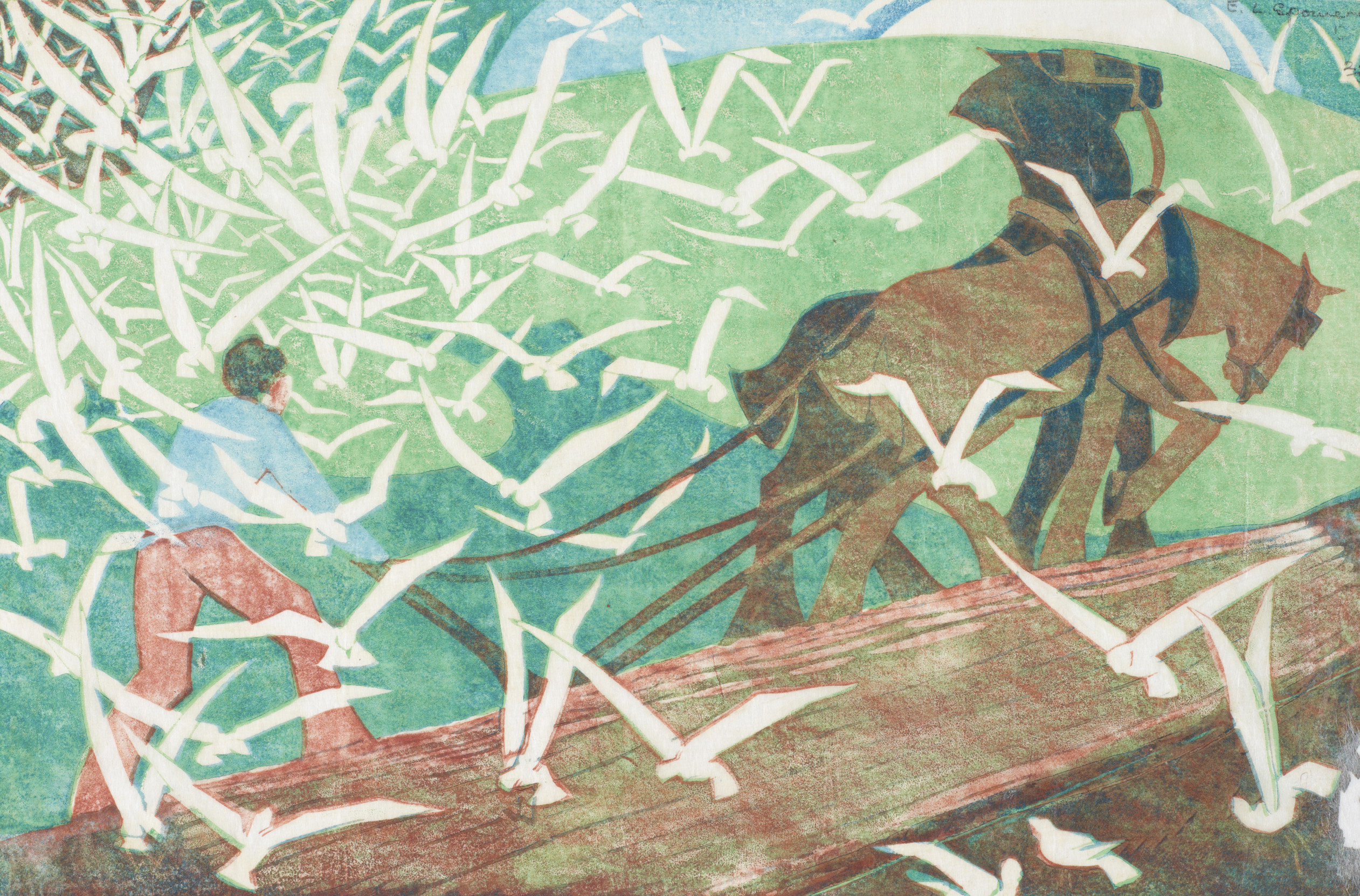
Ethel Spowers, The plough, 1928, linocut. Gift of Rex Nan Kivell, 1953. Museum of New Zealand Te Papa Tongarewa (1953-0003-327)

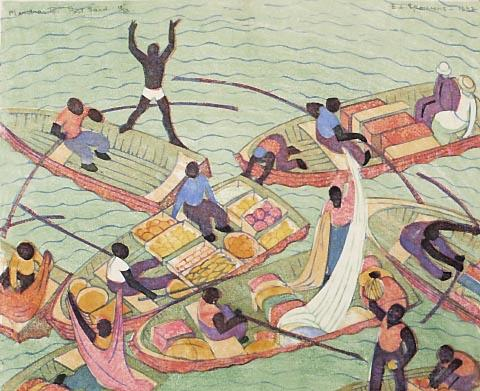
Ethel Spowers, Merchants, Port Said, 1932, linocut. Gift of Rex Nan Kivell, 1953. Auckland Art Gallery Toi o Tāmaki (1953/2/135)

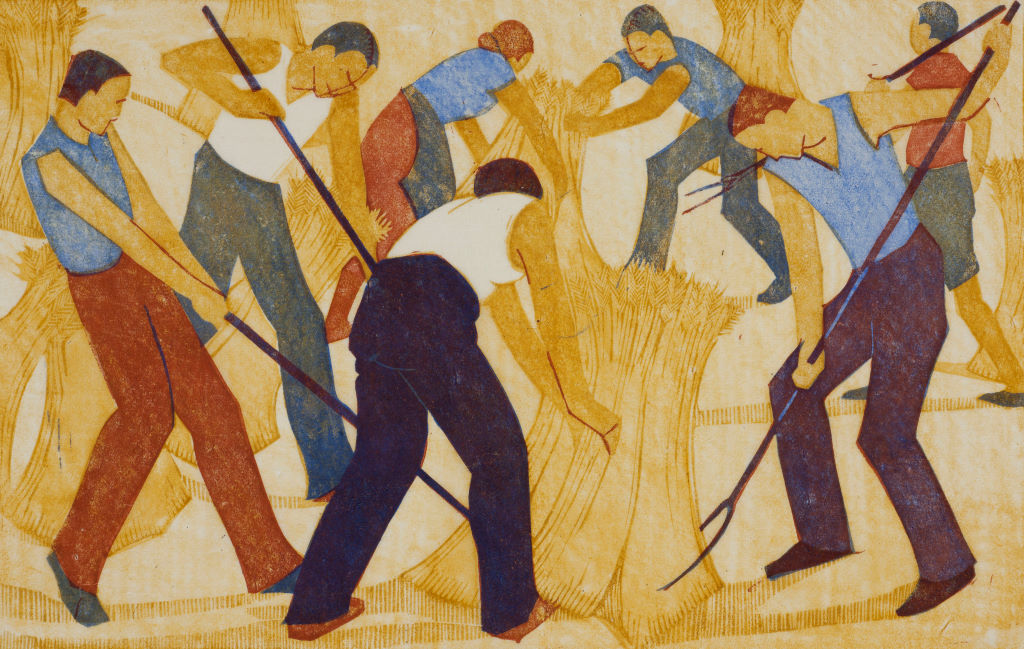
Ethel Spowers, Harvest, 1932, linocut. Gift of Rex Nan Kivell, 1953. Auckland Art Gallery Toi o Tāmaki (1953/2/134)

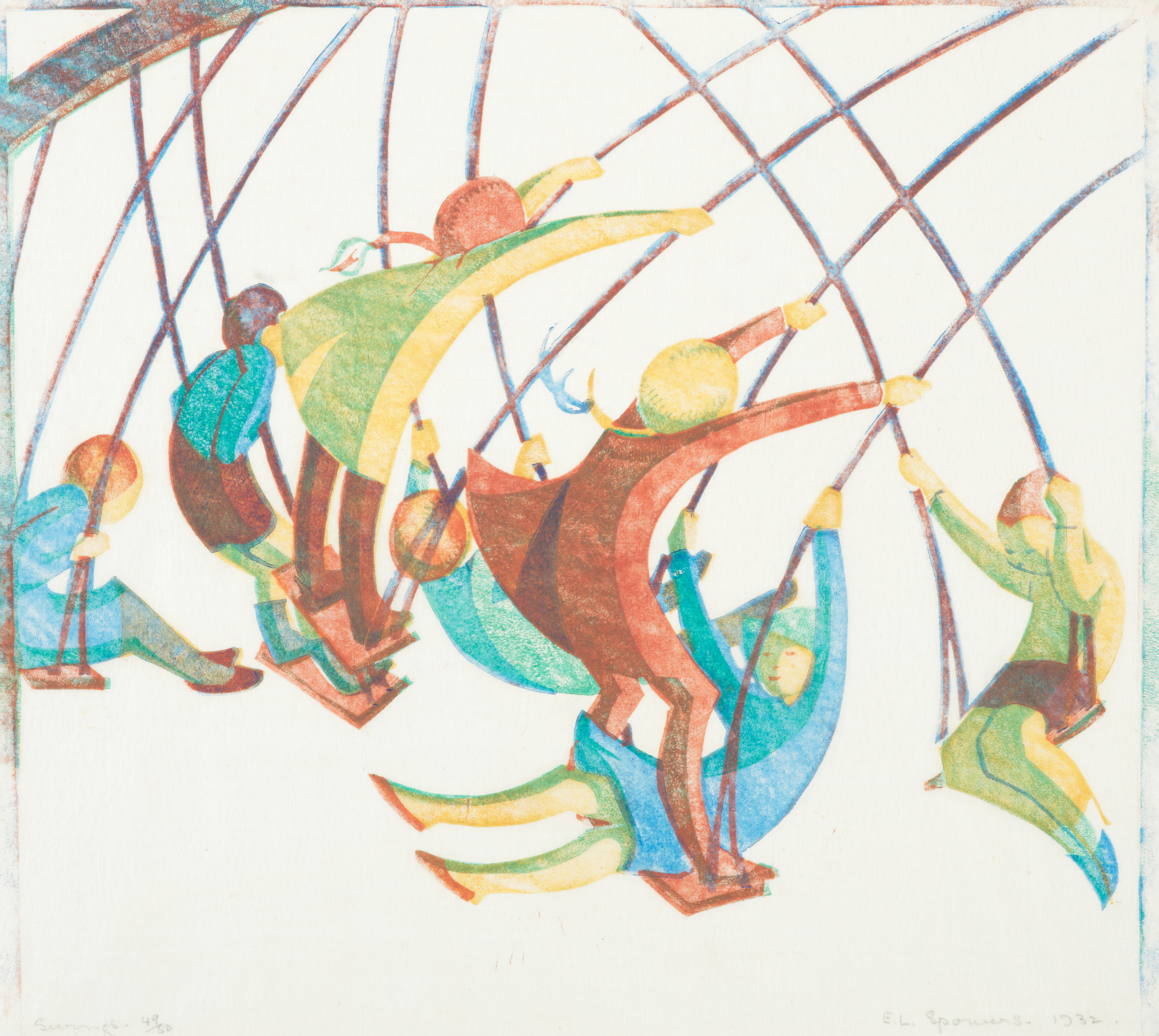
Ethel Spowers, Swings, 1932, linocut. Gift of Rex Nan Kivell, 1953. Museum of New Zealand Te Papa Tongarewa (1953-0003-326)

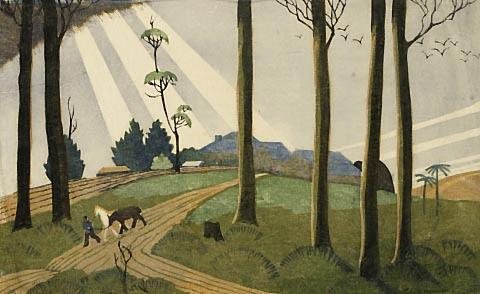
Ethel Spowers, The Lonely Farm, 1933, linocut. Gift of Rex Nan Kivell, 1953. Auckland Art Gallery Toi o Tāmaki (1953/2/137)

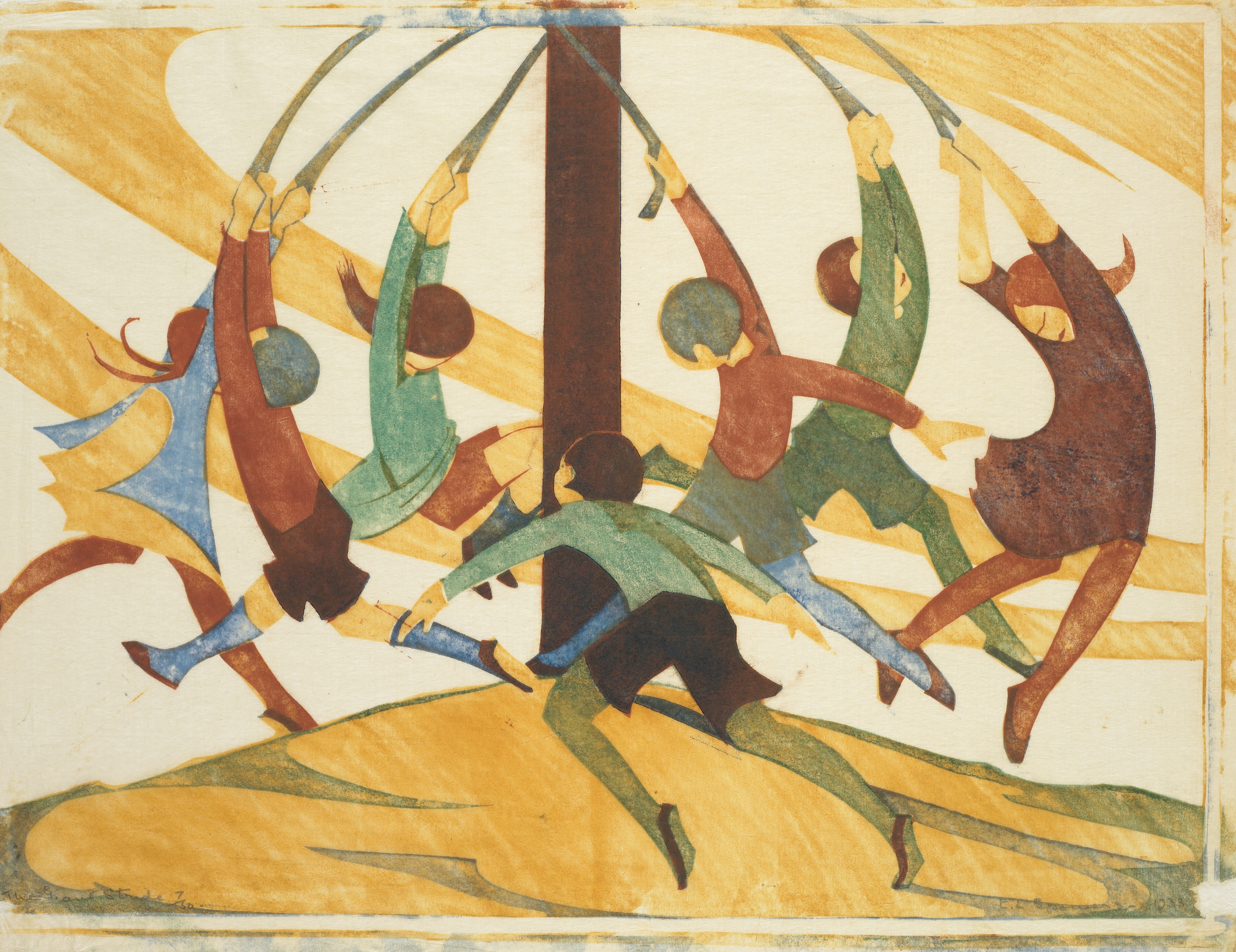
Ethel Spowers, The giant stride, 1933, linocut. Gift of Rex Nan Kivell, 1953. Museum of New Zealand Te Papa Tongarewa (1953-0003-325)

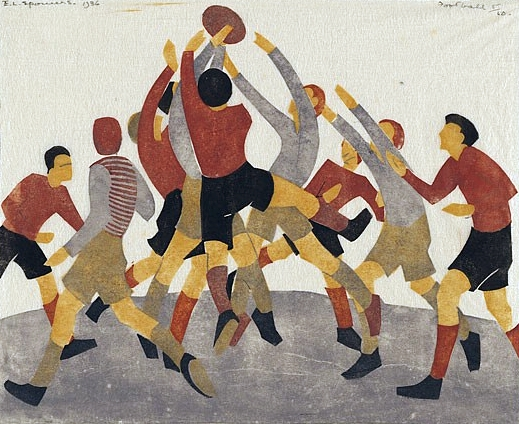
Ethel Spowers, Football, 1936, linocut. National Gallery of Australia

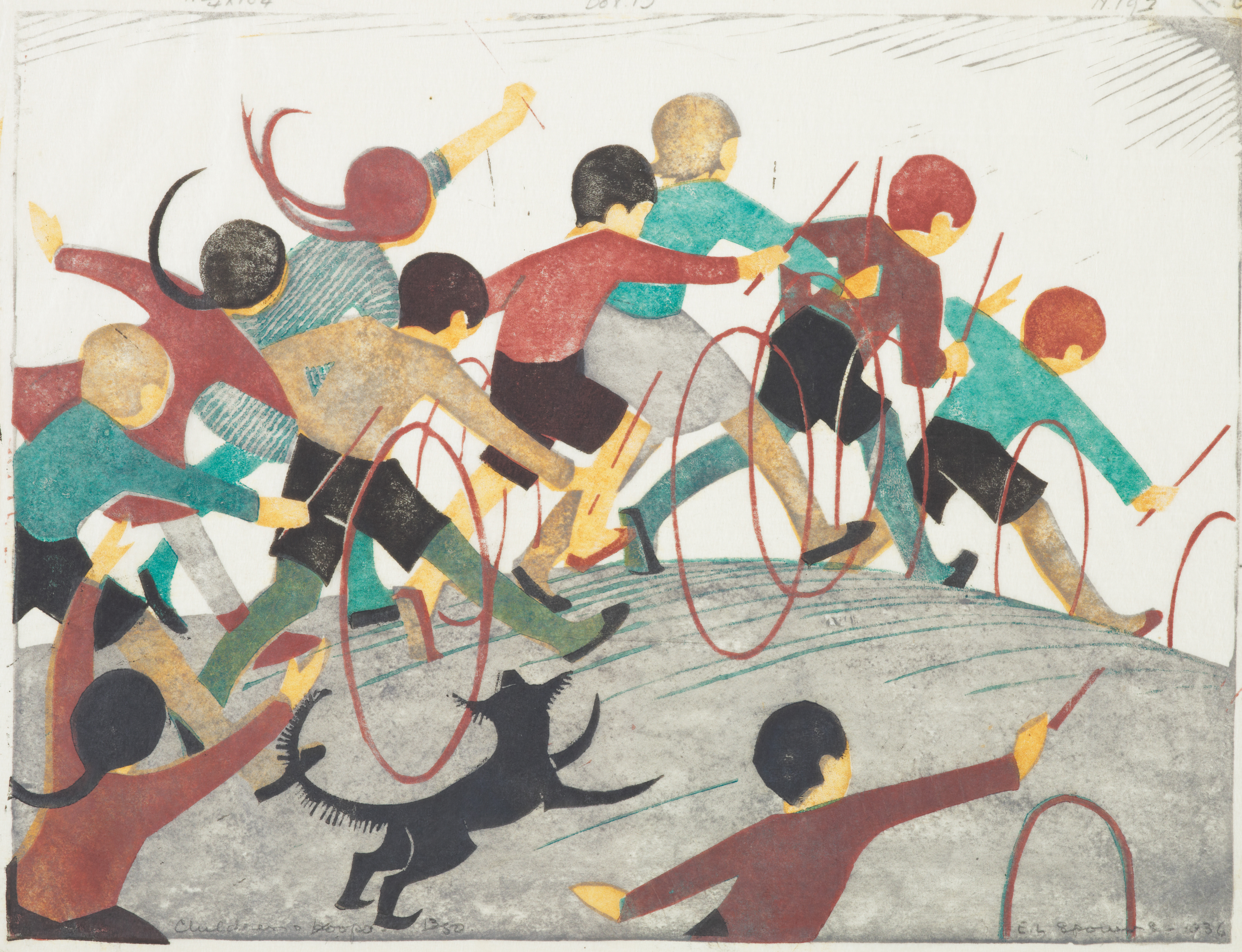
Ethel Spowers, Children’s hoops, 1936, linocut. Gift of Rex Nan Kivell, 1953. Museum of New Zealand Te Papa Tongarewa (1953-0003-329)
