= Gwenda Morgan =

British wood engraver (1908–1991)

- Born: 1 February 1908; Petworth, West Sussex, England
- Died: 9 January 1991 (aged 82); Petworth, West Sussex, England
- Education: Goldsmiths' College of Art; Grosvenor School of Modern Art
- Known for: Wood engraving

Gwenda Morgan (1 February 1908 – 9 January 1991) was a British wood engraver. She lived in the town of Petworth in West Sussex.

== Early life ==
Morgan was born in Petworth, her father having moved there to work at the ironmongers, Austen & Co, of which he later became proprietor. He was the son of a Welsh-born military farrier.

During the Second World War she served in the Women's Land Army.

== Education ==
Following school in Petworth and at Brighton and Hove High School, Morgan studied at Goldsmiths' College of Art in London from 1926. From 1930 she attended the Grosvenor School of Modern Art in Pimlico where she was taught and strongly influenced by the principal, Iain Macnab. The Grosvenor School was a progressive art school and the championing of wood engraving and linocuts fitted with its democratic approach to the arts.

== Works ==
Morgan was commissioned to illustrate a number of books published by private presses. For the Samson Press she produced the frontispiece for Duke Hamilton's Wager in 1934 and Pictures and Rhymes in 1936.

She illustrated four books for the Golden Cockerel Press, including Thomas Gray's Elegy Written in a Country Churchyard (1946) and Grimms' Other Tales (1956); these are her best known works.

The main body of her work drew upon the landscape and buildings around Petworth and the neighbouring South Downs. Her work was inspired by that of Macnab, Percy Douglas Bliss and the Sussex-bred Eric Ravilious.

Throughout the Second World War she worked as a Land Girl just outside Petworth. Her record of those years was published by the Whittington Press in 2002 as The Diary of a Land Girl, 1939-1945.

Her prints are held in the collections of the Victoria and Albert Museum and the British Museum in London, the Ashmolean Museum in Oxford, and the Fitzwilliam Museum in Cambridge, among others.

In 2015 an exhibition, "A Study in Contrast: Sybil Andrews and Gwenda Morgan", was held at the Art Gallery of Greater Victoria in Victoria, British Columbia, Canada, comparing and contrasting the fellow Grosvenor School artists.

Some of her prints are on permanent display in the Leconfield Hall, Petworth, to which Morgan gave a substantial bequest on her death. Wood engravings from the original Morgan blocks are being sold in aid of the Leconfield Hall. Kevis House Gallery in Petworth hold the largest collection of the artist's work.

Three of Morgans engravings are illustrated in the book 'Sussex Landscapes: Chalk, Wood and Water', published for the eponymous exhibition at Pallant House Gallery in 2022/23. The book contains an essay 'Eric Ravilious and Gwenda Morgan. A New Age of Wood Engraving' by Dr. Lydia Miller.

== Affiliations ==
She was a Fellow of the Royal Society of Painter-Etchers & Engravers, an Honorary Member of the Society of Wood Engravers, and a Member of the National Society of Painters, Sculptors and Engravers, and she showed work at their annual exhibitions. She also exhibited at the Royal Academy and at the Redfern Gallery.
