= Anthony Nigro =

American singer-songwriter

Anthony Nigro is an American singer-songwriter. He is a founding member of Osgoods, the rock band formed in Tucson, Arizona with school-mate and drummer Colin Wyatt. In 1998, Nigro relocated to Los Angeles.

== Discography with Osgoods ==
- Automatic Do-Over (2003, re-released 2008)
- Smother and Shrink (2006)
