= Suzanne Cooper =

English painter

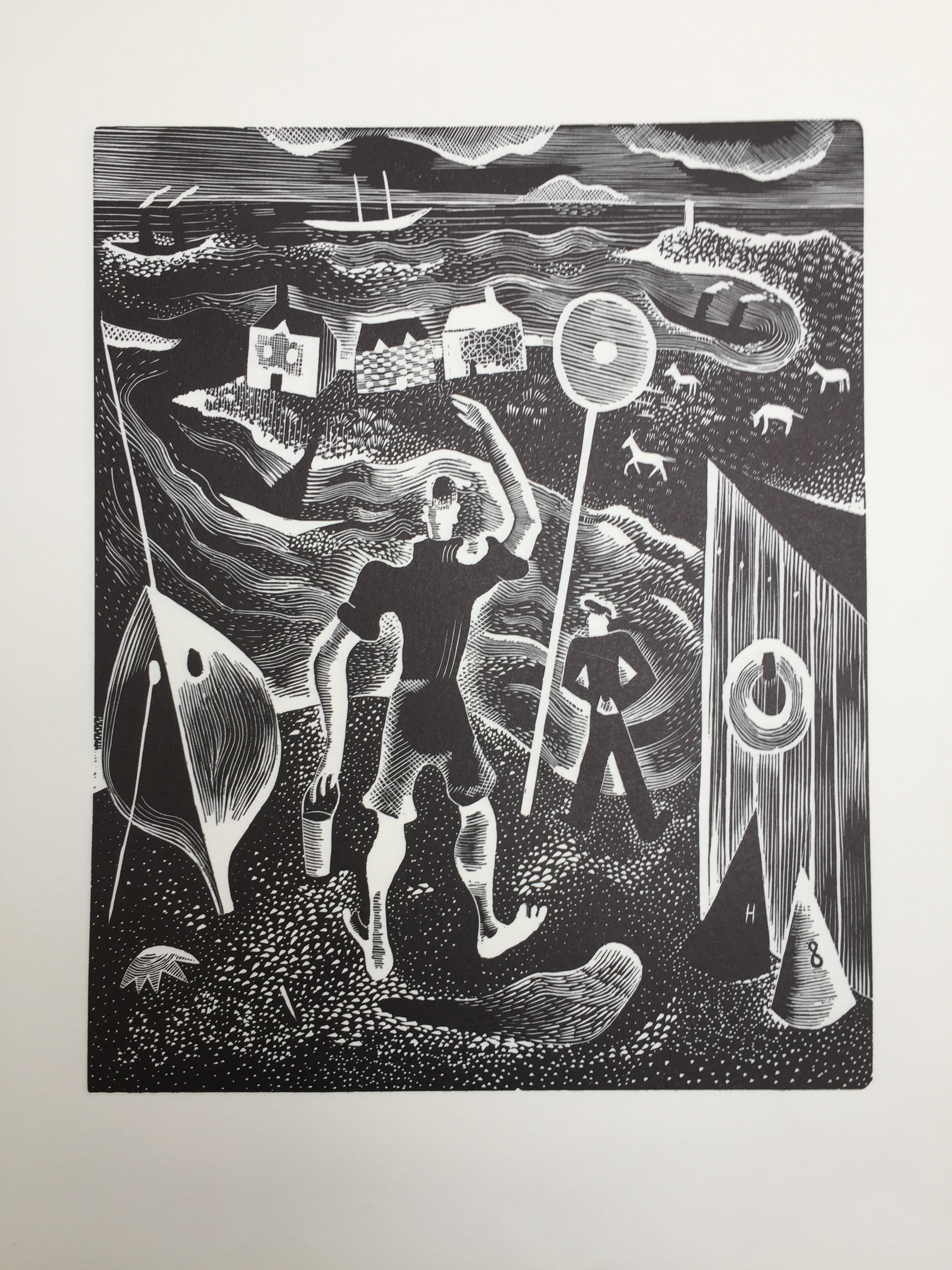
Brightlingsea - wood engraving by Suzanne Cooper 1937

Suzanne Cooper (1916–1992) was a British Modernist painter and wood-engraver.

== Work and life ==
Her 1936 oil painting "Royal Albion," at the Auckland Art Gallery (NZ), is noted for the "artist's use of simplified blocks of form and colour."

She grew up in Frinton-on-Sea and studied at the Grosvenor School of Modern Art in London. Between 1935 and 1939, she exhibited her oil-paintings and wood-engravings at the Redfern Gallery, the Zwemmer Gallery, the Wertheim Gallery and the Stafford Gallery, and with the National Society of Painters, Sculptors & Print-Makers and the Society of Women Artists.

== In collections ==
The influential collector Lucy Wertheim, in addition to exhibiting her work, bought two of Cooper's oil paintings.

== Exhibitions ==
- "Suzanne Cooper: The Rediscovery of a Forgotten Artist," 17–25 March 2018, The Fry Art Gallery Too, Saffron Walden (solo exhibition)
- "Suzanne Cooper and the art of wood engraving," 2 June - 1 July 2018, Printroom Studio, Suffolk (group exhibition)
- 'Suzanne Cooper' 1–7 April 2019 - The Morley Gallery, London (solo exhibition)
