= Edith Lawrence =

British artist (1890-1973)

- Born: Edith Mary Lawrence; 22 March 1890; Walton-on-Thames, Surrey, England
- Died: 2 October 1973 (aged 83); Salisbury, Wiltshire, England
- Education: Slade School of Art
- Known for: Painting, print-making

Edith Mary Lawrence (22 March 1890 – 2 October 1973) was a British artist known for her landscape and portrait paintings, her colour linocuts and her textile designs.

== Biography ==
Lawrence was born in Walton-on-Thames in Surrey and was the youngest daughter of George Adams Lawrence, the owner of a grocery store in central London. She attended Queen's College, London until 1908 and then studied at the Slade School of Art in London between 1910 and 1914. At the Slade, Lawrence was a prize winning student, gaining first-class certificates for both painting and drawing. In 1917 she first exhibited paintings at both the Royal Academy and with the New English Art Club. Also in 1917 Lawrence began teaching art at Runston Hill School. In 1922 Lawrence met the painter and linocut artist Claude Flight and the two became lifelong companions. After living at his studio in St John's Wood for a time, the couple set up a new studio in 1927 off Baker Street from where they run an interior decoration business and produced murals, textiles and decorative household objects. Lawrence also exhibited on a regular basis throughout the 1930s at both the Ward and Redfern galleries. During her career Lawrence also exhibited with the Society of Women Artists, the National Portrait Society and with the Royal Institute of Painters in Water-colours. A joint exhibition of Lawrence and Flight's work was held at the Embroiderer's Guild in 1937 and they wrote and illustrated three books for children together. In June Lawrence and Flight moved to a village in Wiltshire but retained their London studio which was subsequently destroyed in the Blitz.

Lawrence nursed Flight from 1947, when he suffered a stroke, until his death in 1955. By then Lawrence's eye-sight was failing but a cataract operation allowed her to continue painting. A career retrospective of Lawrence's work was held at the University of Hull in the summer of 1973 and a memorial exhibition in her honour was held at the Parkin Gallery in London later that year, following her death at a nursing home in Salisbury.
