= Chica Macnab =

Scottish painter and wood-engraver (1889-1980)

- Born: Ada Jane Macnab; 1889; Iloilo, Philippines
- Died: 1980 (aged 90–91)
- Education: Glasgow School of Art
- Known for: Painting and printmaking
- Spouse: James Munro (m.1927)

Ada Jane Macnab (1889–1980) known as Chica Macnab, and later as Ada Munro, was a Scottish artist notable as a wood-engraver and painter.

== Biography ==
Macnab was born in the Philippines in the province of Iloilo where her Scottish parents were based while her father worked for the Hong Kong and Shanghai Bank. When the family returned to Scotland, Macnab was educated at Kilmacolm before studying at the Glasgow School of Art from 1922 to 1925. She became a founding member of the Glasgow-based Society of Artist Printers and as soon as she graduated, the Glasgow School employed Macnab to establish and run a class on lithography and colour block printing. Macnab only taught the class for a year, during 1926 and 1927, but her students included Alison Mackenzie. She remained in Glasgow and joined the Glasgow Society of Lady Artists. In 1927 Macnab married James Munro, a chemist, and after she started to raise a family appears to have put her artistic career on hold. After 1967 she returned to painting and exhibited several oil paintings as Ada Munro. Her brother was also an artist, the painter and printmaker Iain Macnab.
