= Guy Seymour Warre Malet =

English painter

Guy Seymour Warre Malet (1900–1973) was an English landscape and figure engraver, printmaker, watercolourist and oil painter. He spent a large portion of his life on the island of Sark and many of his images are of the Channel Islands.

He was educated at Downside School, Somerset, from 1911 to 1917.

Malet studied at the London and New Art School under Eastman and John Hassall, and at the Grosvenor School of Modern Art under Iain MacNab. He exhibited at the Royal Academy, the Royal Society of British Artists, the Society of Wood Engravers and the New English Art Club. Malet lived in London, Seaford in Sussex and finally in Ditchling.

His painting of Dunfermline is in the collection of the National Railway Museum in York. From 8 September 2017 to 1 January 2018, a mini-retrospective of his wood engravings was held at the Ditchling Museum of Art + Craft, where his work was last shown in 1968.
