= Osgoods =

American rock band

Osgoods are an American rock band with its roots in Tucson, Arizona. The band was formed by guitarist Anthony Nigro and drummer Colin Wyatt while they were both attending college in Tucson. In 1998, the band relocated to Los Angeles. In 2003 they released their first full album, Automatic Do-Over, followed by Smother and Shrink in 2006.

== Discography ==
- Automatic Do-Over (2003)
- Smother and Shrink (2006)

== Members ==
- Anthony Nigro (vocals, guitar)
- David Jurs (bass)
- Dan Hull (drums/percussion)
- Colin Wyatt (drums)
