= Barbara Nevins Taylor =

American investigative journalist

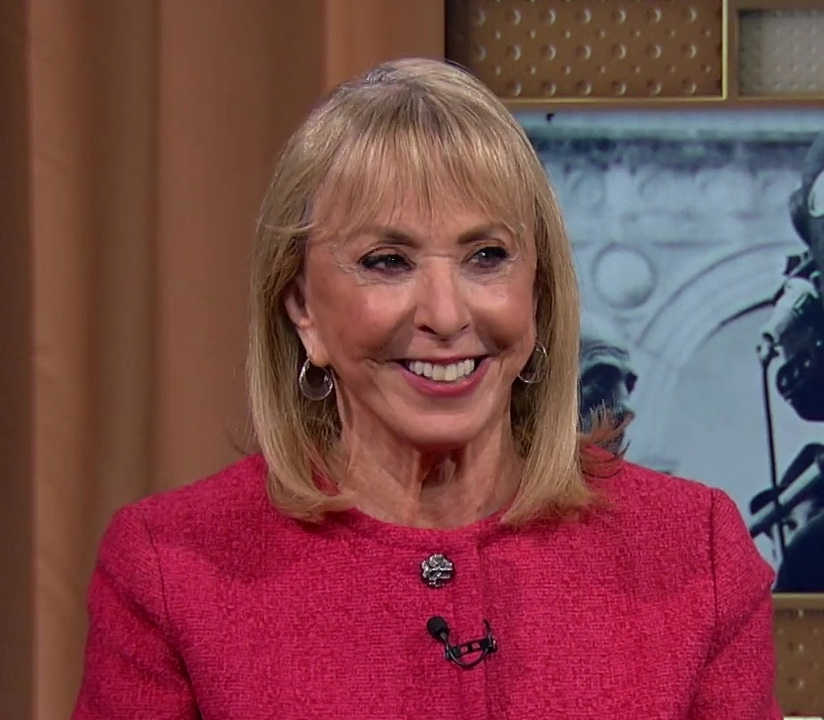
- Taylor on CUNY TV's City Cinematheque, 2024
- Born: Barbara Segal; New York City, New York, U.S.
- Education: City College of New York
- Occupations: Journalist, author, audio narrator
- Years active: 1974–present
- Spouse: Nick Taylor
- Parent(s): Zelick Richard "Zeke" Segal and Juliet Beatrice
- Website: www.consumermojo.com

Barbara Nevins Taylor is an American investigative journalist, journalism professor, audiobook narrator and author. She serves as Acting Journalism Program Director at the City College of New York. Nevins Taylor is also founder of ConsumerMojo.com, a website that provides information about consumer-sensitive issues. She has won awards for her reporting, and in addition to her television work has written articles about social justice, women and children for publications including The New York Times.

== Early biography ==
Barbara Nevins Taylor, née Segal, grew up in Laurelton, Queens, New York City, the first child of Juliet Beatrice, an elementary public school teacher, and Zelick Richard "Zeke" Segal, an actor, CBS television news executive, playwright and professor. Barbara studied acting at New York's High School of Performing Arts - later named LaGuardia High School - and worked in off-off Broadway productions. She graduated from The City College of New York in 1970 with majors in English literature and sociology.

== Journalism career ==
Nevins Taylor began her journalism career in the late 1960s as an assistant beauty and fashion editor at Macfadden Communications Group. After completing college and taking a few acting roles, she resumed her journalism career in 1974 as a reporter for WHNT-TV, Huntsville, Alabama. The next year she moved to WKYT in Lexington, Kentucky, where in addition to general assignment reporting, she co-anchored the 5 p.m. news. She went on to Atlanta's WAGA-TV in 1976 as a general assignment and political reporter covering the Georgia General Assembly, Atlanta City Hall, and Jimmy Carter's presidential campaigns in 1976 and 1980. She also co-anchored Sunday Evening, a news and public affairs show.

== Investigative journalism ==
In 1984, Nevins Taylor returned to New York as a general assignment and enterprise/investigative reporter for WCBS-TV. Among other assignments she covered the trials in federal and state courts of Gambino crime boss John Gotti and the federal court trial of New York's five Mafia families known as the Mafia Commission case. She also covered the trials of Claus Von Bulow, Leona Helmsley, Imelda Marcos, and alleged arms dealer Adnan Khashoggi. During her work for WCBS-TV she regularly reported about social issues including homelessness, the foster care crisis and the crack cocaine epidemic. Her work included reporting in the award-winning series on foster care, No Place To Call Home. She also co-hosted, with long-time anchor Jim Jensen, the weekly news retrospective Sunday Edition. Nevins Taylor also discovered potential for election fraud in New York City when she was able to register multiple times to vote in primary elections.

=== CNBC ===
Nevins Taylor's investigative portfolio expanded when she moved to CNBC in 1992. The business cable channel hired her as a correspondent on The Real Story and she also hosted Consumer Speak-Out, a show with a live audience that explored consumer issues.

=== WWOR-TV, UPN9, MY9 and WNYW-Fox5 ===
In 1993, Nevins Taylor went to work for WWOR-TV, also to become UPN9, and MY9. As an investigative reporter, she covered issues involving white-collar crime such as mortgage fraud, government wrong-doing, illegal cosmetic surgeries, and unlicensed doctors. Her enterprise reports led to federal, state and local criminal prosecutions, and one series of reports sparked a congressional hearing. She also covered breaking news and hard news stories, including the terrorist attacks on New York's World Trade Center on September 11, 2001, where she reported live for both UPN9 and sister station Fox5. She continued as an investigative reporter and joined the investigative team at WNYW Fox5, WWOR's sister station.

=== ConsumerMojo ===
In 2012, Nevins Taylor founded ConsumerMojo, a website that focuses on consumer issues, including online scams, credit and credit reports, retirement, Medicare, travel, immigration and concerns of people over 55.

== Teaching ==
Nevins Taylor began teaching in 2010 and was an assistant professor in the Department of Television and Radio at Brooklyn College until 2015. She taught active writing and video storytelling. She also acted as the de facto news director of a student news team that reported and produced stories for local cable broadcast. In 2014, her students won the national Emmy for the best student broadcast. At Hunter College in 2012, she was the Jack Newfield Visiting Professor of Investigative Journalism teaching investigative reporting for video platforms. She taught broadcast writing at Hofstra University in 2012–2013. Since the fall of 2016, she has taught television journalism and video reporting, and Introduction to Journalism with an emphasis on writing in the Department of Media and Communication Arts at The City College of New York.

== Awards and honors ==
Nevins Taylor has received many television journalism awards from organizations including the National Academy of Television Arts & Sciences, New York Chapter, Associated Press, New York Press Club, Newswomen's Club of New York and the Society of Professional Journalists Deadline Club, and The Silurians Press Club. Her awards include: a 2012 Emmy for Journalistic Enterprise, 2010 Emmy for an investigation into a Ponzi scheme, 2010 for an investigation into Unpaid Workers, 2009 for an investigation into Medicaid Fraud. In 2007 she won four Emmy awards including a 2007 Emmy for an investigative series about a police informant, a 2007 Emmy for an investigation into parking ticket payments, a 2007 Emmy for on-camera talent for an investigation into mortgage fraud, a 2004 Emmy for “No Way To Live,” a series of reports that uncovered dangerous living conditions in New York City, a 2009 Front Page Award for news reporting and 2007 Front Page Award for investigative reporting from the Newswomen's Club of New York, a 2011 New York Press Club award for her investigation into local government waste, and a 2010 award for her reporting about unpaid workers from the New York Press Club. The City College of New York, awarded her Townsend Harris Medal for achievement in investigative journalism, and she was also voted into the CCNY Communications Alumni Hall of Fame. Encore.org named her one of its Purpose Prize fellows in 2014 for founding and her reporting on ConsumerMojo.com.

== Bibliography ==
- Beautiful Skin of Color: A Comprehensive Guide to Asian, Olive, and Dark Skin, Barbara Nevins Taylor, Fran Cook-Bolden and Jeanine Downie, ReganBooks, 10 May 2005, ISBN 978-0060521554
