= Colin Wyatt (musician) =

American drummer and songwriter

Colin Wyatt is an American drummer and songwriter. He is a founding member of Osgoods, the rock band formed in Tucson, Arizona with school-mate and guitarist Anthony Nigro. In 1998, Wyatt relocated to Los Angeles.

== Discography with Osgoods ==
- Automatic Do-Over (2003, re-released 2008)
- Smother and Shrink (2006)
