= Eileen Mayo =

New Zealand artist (1906–1994)

Eileen Mayo DBE
- Born: Eileen Rosemary Mayo; 11 September 1906; Norwich, Norfolk, England
- Died: 4 January 1994 (aged 87); Christchurch, New Zealand
- Education: Clifton High School, Bristol
- Alma mater: Slade School; Central School of Arts and Crafts; Chelsea Polytechnic
- Known for: Postage stamp design
- Spouse: Richard Gainsborough (m. 1938; sep. 1952)

Dame Eileen Rosemary Mayo DBE (11 September 1906 – 4 January 1994) was a British artist and designer who worked in England, Australia and New Zealand in almost every available medium – drawings, woodcuts, lithographs on stone and tempera, tapestry and silk screening. In addition to being a printmaker, illustrator, calligrapher and muralist, she designed coins, stamps, tapestry and posters, and wrote and illustrated eight books on natural science.

== Life in England ==
Mayo was born in Norwich and educated in Yorkshire and the Clifton High School, Bristol. She had a thorough grounding in art, studying at the Slade School in London from 1924 to 1925, the Central School of Arts and Crafts under Noel Rooke and John Farleigh, and under Henry Moore at the Chelsea Polytechnic in 1936.

In 1927, Mayo was instructed in lino-cutting by Claude Flight over the telephone. Her resulting print was called "Turkish Bath", which was included in the Redfern Gallery's 'First Exhibition of British Linocuts'. The picture was subsequently bought by the Victoria and Albert Museum. In 1948, she moved to Paris to study with Fernand Léger at the Académie de Montmartre.

Mayo held teaching positions at Saint Martin's School of Art, and Sir John Cass College in London between 1950 and 1953. She became a member of the Society of Wood Engravers, and wrote and illustrated a series of books. She also exhibited at the Royal Academy summer exhibition and with the Royal Society of British Artists. For a time she worked as an artists' model, for Bernard Meninsky, Duncan Grant, Dod Procter and particularly Laura Knight.

=== Marriage ===
In 1936, Mayo married Richard Gainsborough, who founded Art News & Reviews; she designed the first issue when it appeared in 1949. The marriage ended in 1952.

== Life in Australia ==
Mayo emigrated to Australia in 1952 after separating from her husband and became one of the many migrants who contributed to the postwar print revival. She taught at the National Art School in Sydney between 1957 and 1962, and was a member of Sydney Printmakers. Her career in Australia included working on murals and designing tapestries and posters.

=== Stamp design in Australia ===
As part of the Australian Commonwealth series of six postage stamps issued between 1959 and 1962, Mayo designed the platypus for the one-shilling stamp and was awarded the Maude Vizard-Wholohan Prize for prints in 1962. Other stamps in the series feature the kangaroo, banded anteater, tiger cat, rabbit bandicoot and the Tasmanian tiger (now believed extinct). This stamp series is significant as it was one of the earliest attempts at putting Australian flora and fauna on stamps. In addition, it was one of the first times that a designer further commercialised their designs by producing poster versions of the stamp artwork and made them available for sale. This series, the first to be designed by a woman, were for the Postmaster-General's Department now called Australia Post. Mayo produced many stamp and poster designs depicting the flora and fauna of Australia.

== Life in New Zealand ==
In 1962, Mayo moved to Waimate, New Zealand, where her mother and sister had lived since 1921. By 1965, Mayo had moved to Christchurch, where she taught at the University of Canterbury School of Fine Arts from 1967 until 1972. For more than three years, she also worked on an underwater diorama with Otago Museum. A founding member of Sydney Printmakers, she was on the Print Council of New Zealand. Apart from a period in Dunedin from 1972 to 1975, Mayo remained in Christchurch until her death. Her last works were silkscreen prints, which she found the easiest medium to use with decreasing mobility, insisting, as always, that they be sold at affordable prices.

Mayo was created a Dame Commander of the Order of the British Empire, for services to art, in the 1994 New Year Honours, one week before her death at the age of 87.

=== Stamp design in New Zealand ===
Mayo continued to design stamps in New Zealand, such as the 1969 Cook Bicentenary, 1971 Antarctic Treaty, and UNICEF commemoratives, and six stamps of the 1970 moths and fish definitive series for the New Zealand Post Office.

== Work in public collections in New Zealand ==
Mayo's work is held in many public institutions in New Zealand, including the Aigantighe Art Gallery, the Dowse Art Museum, the Dunedin Public Art Gallery the Hocken Collections, Te Manawa, the Christchurch Art Gallery, the National Library of New Zealand, the Rotorua Museum of Art and History, the Museum of New Zealand Te Papa Tongarewa, and the Alexander Turnbull Library.

== Selected publications ==
=== Books written and illustrated by Mayo ===
- The Story of Living Things and their Evolution
- Nature's ABC
- Little Animals of the Countryside
- Larger Animals of the Countryside
- Animals on the Farm (Puffin Picture Book No. 84, published by Penguin Books, 1951)
- Shells and How They Live
- Serge Lifar: Sixteen Drawings in Black and White

=== Books illustrated by Mayo ===
- First French Course for Seniors
- Some Scottish Dances
- Best Cat Stories
- A Primer of Classical Ballet (Cecchetti Method) for Children
- A Second Primer of Classical Ballet (Cecchetti Method) for Children
- One Day on Beetle Rock
- Rational Limbering
- The Story of the World
- The Children's Circus Book
- Japanese Garland
- Toys
- The Poems of Amriolkais (Sir Williams Jones, translator)
