= Grosvenor School of Modern Art =

Former art school in London, England

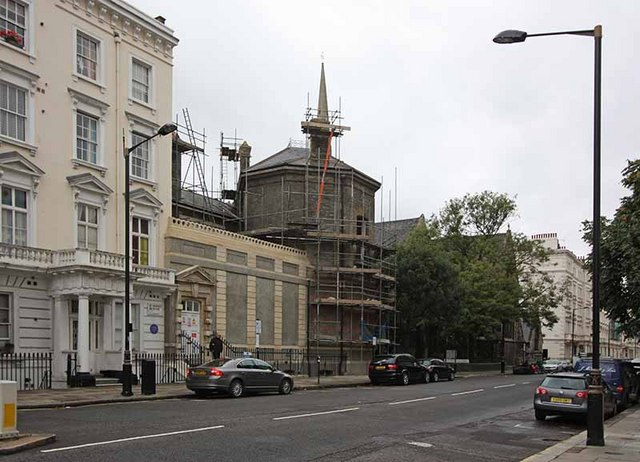
- 33 Warwick Square, the former home of the Grosvenor School of Modern Art (scaffolded, centre)
- Active: 1925–1940
- Founder: Iain Macnab
- Location: London, United Kingdom; 51.4896°N 0.1418°W
- Campus: 33 Warwick Square, Pimlico

The Grosvenor School of Modern Art was a private British art school and, in its shortened form ("Grosvenor School"), the name of a brief British-Australian art movement. It was founded in 1925 by the Scottish wood engraver Iain Macnab in his house at 33 Warwick Square in Pimlico, London. From 1925 to 1930 Claude Flight ran it with him, and also taught linocutting there; among his students were Sybil Andrews, Cyril Power, Lill Tschudi and William Greengrass.

== The school ==
The school had no formal curriculum and students studied what and when they wished. There were day and evening courses: life classes, classes in composition and design, and classes on the history of modern art. Frank Rutter taught a course entitled "From Cézanne to Picasso". Macnab's wife, the dancer Helen Wingrave, gave a dance course. Though there was no formal curriculum, all students attended Claude Flight's linocut classes.

The Grosvenor School closed in 1940, merging with the Heatherley School of Fine Art.

== Legacy ==
The school did much to revive interest in printmaking in general, and particularly in the linocut, in the years between the Wars. Artists associated with it have come to be known as the "Grosvenor School", and their work commands high prices.

In June–September 2019, the Dulwich Picture Gallery in London hosted the first major exhibition presenting solely the output of the Grosvenor School alumni in a public museum; it was also the first major exhibition outside Australia to have considerable examples of the works by the Australian alumni Ethel Spowers, Dorrit Black and others.

== Alumni ==
Among those who studied at the school were:

- Sybil Andrews (1898-1992)
- Margaret Barnard (1898–1992)
- Dorrit Black (1891–1951)
- Tom Chadwick (1912–1942)
- Suzanne Cooper (1916–1992)
- Pamela Drew (1910–1989)
- Anna Findlay (1885–1968)
- Ronald Grierson (1901–1993)
- Mary Elizabeth Groom (1903–1958)
- Guy Malet (1900–1973)
- Alison McKenzie (1907–1982)
- Gwenda Morgan (1908–1991), wood engraver
- Cyril Power (1872–1951)
- Rachel Reckitt (1908–1995), wood engraver and sculptor
- Adolfine Mary Ryland (1903–1983)
- Ethel Spowers (1890–1947)
- Helen Stewart (1900-1983)
- Eveline Syme (1888–1961)
- Barbara Austin Taylor (1891–1951), sculptor
- Lill Tschudi (1911–2004)
- William Greengrass (1898–1972), wood engraver, sculptor, one time curator at the V&A
- Colin Wyatt (1909-1975)

Spowers, Black and Syme became instrumental in organising exhibitions and promoting the school in Australia.
