= Colin Wyatt (skier) =

British champion skier and lepidopterist (1909–1975)

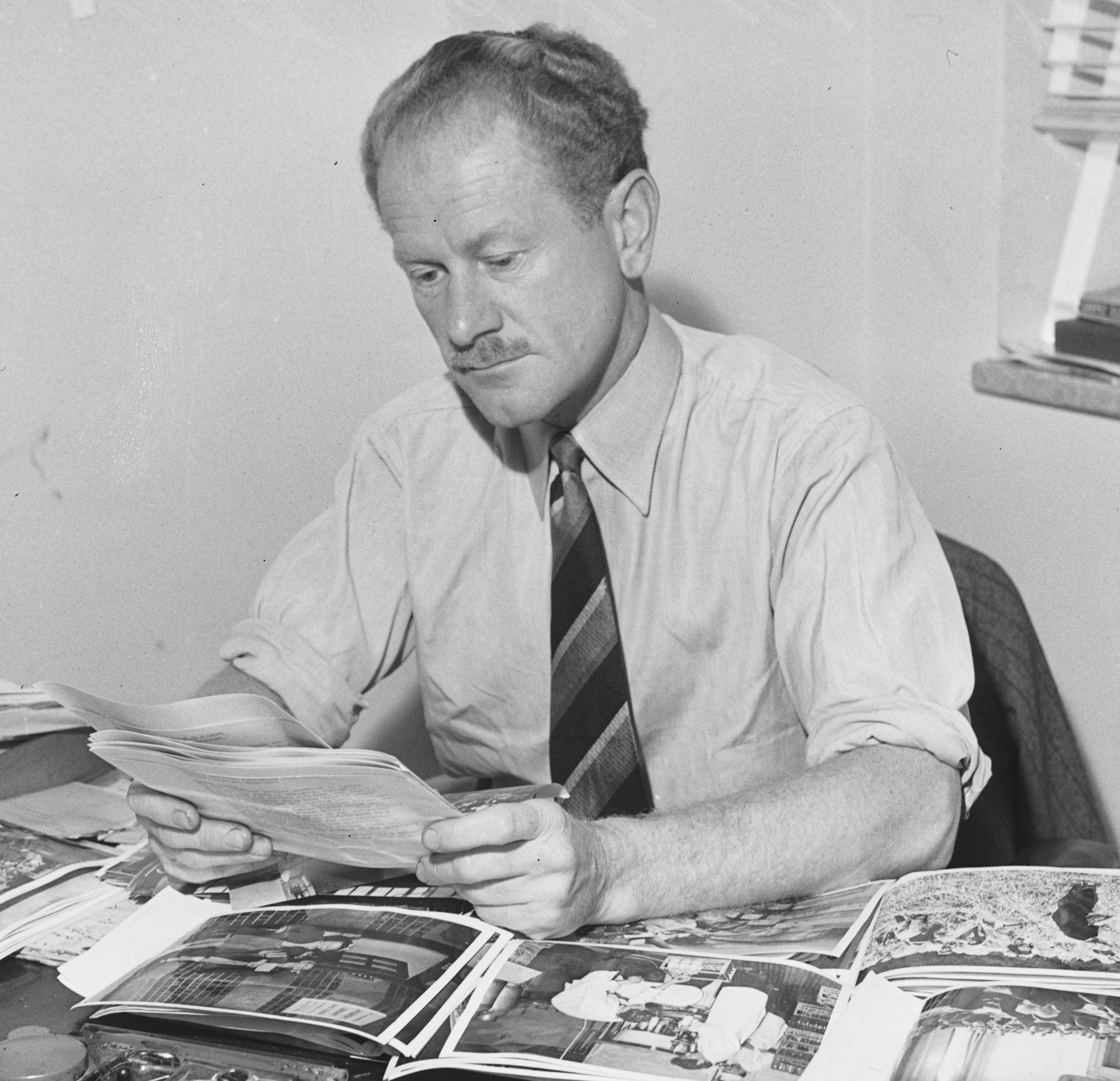
- Colin Wyatt, Sydney, 1946
- Born: 8 February 1909; London, England
- Died: 18 November 1975 (aged 66); Guatemala
- Occupations: Ski-racer, ski-jumper, ski-mountaineer, artist, lepidopterist, author and photographer

Colin Wyatt (8 February 1909 – 18 November 1975) was a British ski-racer, ski-jumper, ski mountaineer, artist, lepidopterist, author, and photographer; world traveller.

== Early life ==
Born in Marylebone, London, he was christened Colin William fforde Wyatt but went by the name Colin Wyatt. He was the son of James William Wyatt, a civil engineer, mountaineer, lepidopterist and botanist, and Margaret Ellen Nicol (only daughter of Donald Ninian Nicol, MP for Argyllshire, Scotland). At the age of 10, he contracted bronchial pneumonia and his mother took him to the Swiss Alps where he recovered. He was an only child and was introduced by his father to botany and entomology when a very young boy, as well as to ski-ing and climbing.

He attended Le Rosey school, Switzerland and a crammer's before going to Gonville and Caius College, Cambridge. He studied art in Paris and London.

== Skiing and ski-jumping ==
After university, he combined his interests in travel, art, skiing and mountaineering and travelled extensively throughout his life, receiving national and European recognition as a ski jumper and cross-country skier, and as a ski-racer in the newly-developing categories of slalom and downhill. He was invited, as a winter sports expert, to New Zealand to advise on the development of ski sports and tourism.

During the 1920s and early 1930s, Wyatt won numerous cups and medals in downhill, jumping, slalom and cross-country skiing. Newspaper sports results covered the Oxford and Cambridge races, Inter Varsity Winter Sports Games, European Ski Championships, Anglo-Swiss Universities' races, International University Winter Games, and Federation Internationale de Ski (FIS) championships.

Arnold Lunn, founder in 1908 of the Alpine Ski Club, wrote in 1929 of the British taking part in long distance, jumping, slalom and downhill, and said: "The best all-round performance was that of Colin Wyatt, who distinguished himself in all four events."

He captained the Cambridge Ski and Ski Jumping Clubs and represented Great Britain as a ski jumper on numerous occasions in Europe. In 1933, Wyatt was the first English competitor to take part in the Holmenkollen ski-jumping contest, in Norway. He took part in the first international slalom and downhill contest to be held in Norway, coming 1st in slalom, and 5th in downhill.

He achieved an entry in the Guinness Book of Records with the most wins in the British Ski Jumping Championships (discontinued in 1936) with three: in 1931, 1934 and 1936. He broke the British ski-jumping record three times in competitions (winters of 1928, 1929, 1931), setting the official British record of 57.5 m (187 ft) in 1931. Tim Ashburner, in "The History of Ski Jumping", writes of ski jumping producing "characters rich and rare" and of Wyatt, along with Guy Nixon and Percy Legard, becoming Britain's first 50-metre ski jumpers in the early 1930s.

In the In Memoriam section in Ski Survey, published by the Ski Club of Great Britain, fellow Cambridge ski team member James Riddell wrote of him as "someone utterly unorthodox, bohemian, versatile, controversial, unpredictable".

In 1936 Wyatt was invited, as council delegate of Ski Club of Great Britain, by the New Zealand government and the Federated Council of New Zealand Alpine Clubs to visit all the ski-ing centres and advise on ski-ing development and competitions and the development of winter resorts.

== Mountaineering and Travel ==
Colin Wyatt's achievements in ski-mountaineering included "firsts" in New Zealand, Lapland and Morocco. He submitted a list of mountaineering travels from 1930 to 1950 to the Royal Geographical Society in support of his successful candidacy to become a Fellow. The list included: various summer and winter climbs in the Swiss and Austrian Alps, on foot, on ski, or both; Norway; Albania; Canada; Papua New Guinea; New Zealand; Lapland; Australia; and Morocco. His book The Call of the Mountains describes many of these and a reviewer wrote: "For Mr Wyatt set out to recapture 'the golden age' of climbing and ski-mountaineering such as was known to his father and to Whymper and Mummery, and sought out-of-the-way countries and mountains where very few people had been before.".

Wyatt learned a range of languages and regional dialects, including fluent and colloquial French, German, Spanish, Swedish and Norwegian. He picked up sufficient knowledge of other languages, including Arabic, to get by during his travels to many parts of the world. He yodelled Swiss-German and Tyrolean dialect songs, accompanying himself on the Swiss accordion, and gave vaudeville performances on BBC radio. He was invited to yodel and play the accordion before the then Prince of Wales, later Duke of Windsor, at Oxford and before the King and Queen of Norway when he visited that country in 1933.

Mountaineer John Harding, in his 2016 book Distant Snows: A Mountaineer's Odyssey, refers to Wyatt as someone "who pioneered expeditions to unusual places from the Arctic to the Antipodes", and writes that "Wyatt's exceptional ski mountaineering achievements have all but been forgotten." He writes that "although the first stirrings of New Zealand ski-ing pre-date the First World War, its ski mountaineering history really begins in 1936 when the New Zealand government invited an Englishman, Colin Wyatt, to advise on winter sports development". In an article in the Alpine Journal in 1988 titled "Ski Mountaineering is Mountaineering", Harding wrote of the 1930s as an era of animosity between traditional British climbers and those embracing "the new-fangled sport of ski-ing and, by extension, ski mountaineering". He describes Wyatt as "the outstanding British ski mountaineer of the immediate pre- and post-war years".

In 1936 and 1937 in New Zealand, Southern Alps, Wyatt made the first ascent Mt. Wilycek (10,001 ft); the first double winter ski traverse of Main Divide, via Tasman, Franz Josef, Fox and Haest glaciers and the first winter ascent of Mt. Annan. In North Island, he made a winter traverse of all Ruapehu-Tongariro group of volcanoes, and winter traverse of Mt. Egmont.

In 1938 in Lapland, he made the complete winter crossing of Lapland on ski from Kebnekaise to North Cape, 350 miles.

In 2021, Darren Hamlin, photographer and film-maker, and a team were planning to make a film of a winter crossing of the Kebnekaise. During research, he came across Wyatt's November 1938 article "On Ski through Arctic Lapland to the North Cape" in The Alpine Journal and realised that their winter crossing would not be the first. Hamlin's 2022 film "The Arctic 12" paid tribute to Wyatt, and included some of Wyatt's photographs.

In 1949 in Morocco, he made the complete traverse of the Toubkal Range, High Atlas, in winter (13,000 ft) with several first winter ascents and in 1950 he made the first crossing of Tiferdine and M’Goun (13,000 ft) ranges, to the Sahara and E. High Atlas (and spent five months painting in Morocco). Little was known about the area at that time. In 1912 Morocco had become a protectorate of France and Moroccan nationalists fought for decades for independence which was not granted until 1955. A military permit was required to visit southern Morocco which was a "zone d'insecurité" and the only maps were prepared from aerial surveys.

Further travels described in articles, illustrated with his photography, included seven months travelling the Northwest Territories, Canada; and trips to Kashmir, Nepal, India, Himalayas, Afghanistan, Afghan Hindu-Kush, High Atlas Morocco, Kara-Dagh and Elburs in Azerbaijan, north-western Iran. Up to his death in Guatemala, Wyatt was making regular trips to study and photograph archaeological sites in Central and South America.

== Art ==
He attended the County Council Central School of Art and the Slade School of Art, London, and the Académie Delécluse, Paris. He also attended the Grosvenor School of Art, with tutors Claude Flight and Iain McNab. He made a few works of sculpture.

Between 1928 and 1941, his work was exhibited at the Paris Salon; The Alpine Club; “Grubb Group” exhibition at Quo Vadis Restaurant; Connell Galleries, 47 Old Bond Street, London; Grosvenor School of Modern Art at Storran Gallery; and the Contemporary Art Society’s 3rd annual exhibition, Sydney. His drawings and watercolours of New Guinea and The Trobriand Islands, undertaken during World War II service in the South West Pacific with the Department of Home Security camouflage section and Royal Australian Air Force, were exhibited at The Macquarie Galleries.

- 1932 Alpine Club Gallery
- 1934 Alpine Club Gallery, Connell Galleries, 47 Old Bond Street
- 1938 Palser Galleries, London
- 1944 Macquarie Galleries, Australia
- 1947 Walker's Galleries, Bond Street, London
- 1954 Coste House, Calgary, Canada
- 2018 Online exhibition – Louise Kosman Art

Though Wyatt had successful solo exhibitions he ceased painting around 1953 and turned to making a living from writing, photography, and travel documentary films.

== Lepidoptery ==
Wyatt created a private collection of more than 90,000 specimens of mainly holarctic butterflies, discovering new species and sub-species studied complex butterfly relationships, and contributed scientific papers for entomological magazines in various languages. After his death, his personal collection was acquired by the State Museum of Natural History Karlsruhe, Germany.

His particular interests included Parnassius and Erebia. In 1960, on an expedition to Afghanistan and the Koh-i-Baba mountains and the Hindu-Kush, Wyatt rediscovered one of the rarest Asiatic mountain butterflies, Parnassius autocrator. believed to be extinct. Findings from his expeditions in Kashmir, Nepal up to Mount Everest and Mount Annapurna, and Sikkim, have been published in the journals of the Lepidopterists' Society.

Wyatt's field collecting involved travel off the beaten track, using his ski mountaineering skills. In 1950 he was crossing the m'Goun range of the High Atlas in Morocco as an alpinist, on skis. At 13,000 ft he noticed a migration of Pieris daplidice (L.) passing over from the Sahara, from south to north, and other migratory species.

In the journal Bonner Zoologische Beiträge Otakar Kudrna published an annotated list of the butterflies named by Wyatt and list of his published lepidoptery articles.

Wyatt also achieved notoriety for the theft of butterflies from two Australian museums for his collection, including holotype specimens, and falsifying their labels. In May 1947, in London, he pleaded guilty to the unlawful possession of 1,600 butterfly specimens stolen from the Australian Museum, Sydney, and the South Australian Museum, Adelaide, and was fined £100. His legal defence referred to the break-up of his marriage on his return from being in the RAAF in the South West Pacific during World War II, and, to quote The Sydney Morning Herald of 22 May 1947, "not in full command of his faculties". The court case was widely covered in newspapers. Wyatt co-operated fully with police and most of the stolen specimens were recovered. In the journal Australian Entomologist, an article by W. John Tennent, Chris J. Müller, Axel Hausmann and Simon Hinkley specifically discusses these thefts and Wyatt's subsequent falsification of data labels.

== Books and Journalism ==
Wyatt had three books published. These were:

1952 The Call of The Mountains; Thames and Hudson, London, also MacMillan, Canada, and 1953 New York.

1955 Going Wild (subtitled: The Autobiography of a Bug-Hunter); Hollis and Carter, London; also published in Colombo, Ceylon and Spain.

1958 North of Sixty; Hodder and Stoughton, London.

His articles, illustrated by his photographs, appeared in English and in other languages, in magazines and journals in different countries. Country Life, in particular, published many of his travel articles between 1949 and 1976 (the latter a posthumous article). He also sold photographs to similar publications worldwide.

His articles on ski-ing, ski-mountaineering and climbing were published in journals including The Alpine Journal, the Australian and New Zealand Ski Year Book and The British Ski Year Book.

Wyatt made documentary films including Nepal: Hidden Kingdom of the Himalayas (1958) and Hindustan Holiday (1959), which were shown on TV in the USA and other countries. He lectured with these films throughout the USA and was a guest lecturer on specialist travel trips such as Swan Hellenic. He also made radio broadcasts relating to his travels, including BBC radio.

== Personal life ==
Wyatt married Mary Scott Barrett, of Kingswood, Surrey, in June 1939 and emigrated to Sydney, Australia with the aim of pursuing his art career and trying sheep farming. World War II was declared as the ship docked. Owing to his proficiency in languages, he worked for the Department of Home Security in broadcasting but then joined the camouflage section, linked to the Royal Australian Air Force (RAAF). In 1943 when camouflage directorates were set up in the New Guinea area, he was one of 28 to volunteer to go there and was one of only eight who passed the fitness test.

After World War II, he returned to England and he and Mary divorced. In 1951 he married Elsa Maria Herran, of Medellin, Colombia, and they emigrated to Banff, Alberta, Canada. They had one daughter.

Wyatt became a Buddhist through his friendship with Christmas Humphreys QC, who founded the London Buddhist Lodge, later The Buddhist Society. In November 1956, Wyatt, with the British Buddhist Society’s delegation, attended the Fourth Congress of the World Fellowship of Buddhists at Kathmandu, as official photographer, and was the official delegate from the UK to the Buddha Jayanti Congress in Nepal. Humphreys, in his obituary of Wyatt in the Society's journal The Middle Way, commented on Wyatt's film of the tour being one of the Society's treasures and on Wyatt as "an enthusiastic ambassador" of the Society's work worldwide. He wrote: "Few men knew the world so widely and so well."

As well as being a Fellow of the Royal Geographical Society, he was a member over his lifetime of many ski and alpine clubs in Europe, Australia and New Zealand, including the Alpine Ski Club and Swiss Alpine Club.

== Death ==
In 1975, while researching and photographing pre-Columbian sites in Guatemala, Wyatt died aged 66 in an airplane crash in the mountains on a flight between Flores and Uaxactun.
