= Leslie Gaze =

Leslie Wentworth Gaze (29 February 1880 – 1957) was a baritone singer, born in Australia and educated in New Zealand, remembered in Australia for playing the hero, Bumerli, in the operetta The Chocolate Soldier. His elder daughter Gwen Gaze was an actress who appeared in several Hollywood films.

== History ==
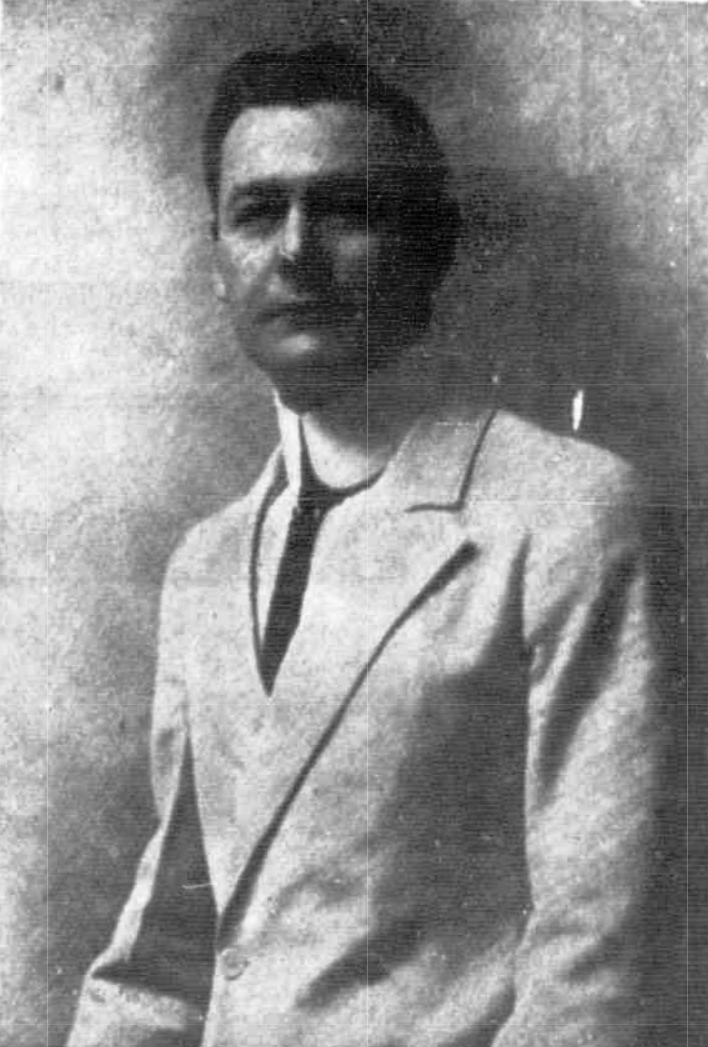
Leslie Gaze 1911

Gaze was born in Adelaide, South Australia, son of William Henry Gaze (c. 1855 – 21 August 1918), a medical doctor with a practice in Norwood and Thebarton. The family moved to Christchurch, New Zealand, where Gaze was educated and sang in St John's Church, Latimer Square, Christchurch.

By 1897 the family had moved to Victoria, where his father acted as consulting chemist, apart from his medical practice.

He left for England, intending to establish a career in medicine, but chose the stage instead, and following an introduction by Willie Edouin, played with several touring London comedy companies, a hand-to-mouth existence. After some training with Ernesto Baraldi (Note: Ernesto Baraldi (1868–1939) was teacher at the College of Music in Manchester 1900–1911.) he won a place with William Greet's company, playing in The Earl and the Girl, for Frank Curzon in Sergeant Brue, Robert Courtneidge in The Blue Moon and George Edwardes in The Girls of Gottenberg. He had a few engagements in America, then returned to England. By December 1910 Gaze was in Ireland with George Edwardes' company, playing Slithers in Our Miss Gibbs, starring Carrie Moore.

He first played Lieut. Bumerli, the title part in The Chocolate Soldier in Australia with the Clarke and Meynell Opera Company at the Theatre Royal, Melbourne from 2 September 1911 with Winifred O'Connor as Nadi. The season concluded at Adelaide in April 1912.

Gaze left for Europe and America by ship; his wife Belle died on the voyage, at Aden on 14 May 1912. He played in Oscar Hammerstein's New York production of The Firefly starring Emma Trentini.

In October 1914 he returned to Melbourne, where he set himself up as a teacher of singing.

In June 1921 he returned to the concert stage, King's Hall, 69 Hunter Street, Sydney, with some of his students.

In 1922 Gaze and his family moved to Los Angeles, where he operated as a real estate agent, later as teacher and insurance broker.

== Other interests ==
Gaze was a keen sportsman, a competitive pigeon shooter and boxer.

== Family ==
Gaze married Alta May Tomlinson (1885–1948), a native of Chicago, USA. They had two daughters:

- Alta Gwendolen "Gwen" Gaze (6 September 1915 – 29 August 2010)
- Pamela Wentworth Gaze (25 February 1921 – 9 August 1993)

His brother Harold Gaze was a writer and illustrator of books for children.
