= Barbara Austin Taylor =

British artist (1891-1951)

Barbara Penson Austin Taylor (1891–1951) was a British sculptor.

== Biography ==
Taylor was born in West Derby, a suburb of Liverpool, and studied in London at the Westminster School of Art, at the Grosvenor School of Modern Art and then at the British School in Rome. After studying stone carving techniques in the workshop of a monumental mason, Taylor established a studio in London, being based in Chelsea for a long period. She produced portrait heads, busts and figures in bronze, stone and plaster. Until a few years before her death, Taylor was a regular exhibitor with the Royal Academy in London and also with the London Group and the Society of Women Artists. Manchester City Art Gallery holds examples of her work.
