= Harold Gaze =

New Zealand author and illustrator

- Born: August 30, 1885 Christchurch, New Zealand
- Died: 1962 (aged 76–77) California, United States (Note: Some sources give 1963 and England as his place of death.)
- Occupation: Author; Illustrator
- Genre: Children's literature Fantasy
- Years active: c. 1908–1930s
- Notable works: Omar in Fairyland; The Mite Merry series Coppertop
- Relatives: Leslie Gaze (brother)

Harold Gaze (30 August 1885 – October 1962), perhaps (1884–1963) was an author and illustrator of books for children.

== History ==
Gaze was born in Christchurch, New Zealand, the younger son of William Henry Gaze (c. 1855 – 21 August 1918), a medical doctor, who had a practice in Adelaide before moving to Christchurch. The operatic baritone Leslie Gaze was his elder brother.

The family moved to England when Gaze was ten years old, and resumed his education there. Byam Shaw helped develop his talent for drawing and storytelling. At age 27 he took his book Omar in Fairyland to New York, where Brentano's of Fifth Avenue undertook to publish it. He did some illustrations for Putnam's Magazine, then returned to England around 1900.

He spent ten years on the English stage, of which the only newsworthy item was his accidental wounding of an actress when a pistol he was brandishing discharged.

In 1911 he left for Australia with his brother Leslie, who was playing the lead role in The Chocolate Soldier operetta. They returned to Britain a year later.

When the Great War broke out and he tried to enlist but was rejected, so worked at a Devonshire factory making shells, then in 1917 was sent to America, inspecting munitions destined for Britain. In 1918 he left for Australia, where his War in Fairyland and The Wicked Winkapong were published by Gordon & Gotch. The first of his "Mite Merry" series, The Billibonga Bird, Chewg-um Blewg-um and The Simple Jaggejay were published by Whitcombe & Tombs in 1919. Angus & Robertson published Coppertop and Coppertop Cruises in 1920, first serialized in the Melbourne Weekly Times. The China Cat and The Enchanted Fish came out in 1922. Adventures of the Dinkum Dodo and Twilight Tales appeared in Australian weeklies. Coppertop in Fairyland was published in the Weekly Times in 1921. Stories like "The Adventures of the Woozelum Bird" appeared in the children's pages of the dailies. His book The Merry Piper appeared in time for Christmas 1925. His later Australian work includes illustrations for Gwen Bourne's The Wonder World Fairy Tale Book'. (1931)

Some time after May 1922, Gaze left for Pasadena, California, where his brother Leslie Gaze and family had also settled, and held a successful solo exhibition in 1924. He worked for some time at the Disney studios.

According to some sources, Gaze died in California in 1962. Others have him moving to England late in life, living near his niece Pamela Gaze, sister of Gwen Gaze, and dying in 1963.

== Recognition ==
Issue 381, December 1924, of The Studio contained an illustrated article on his work, mentioning that two further works, The Goblin's Glen and Dick o' Dingles had been published by Little, Brown and Co. in the US.

Work by Gaze is held in the National Museum of American Illustration, the Pasadena Museum of History, and the San Diego Museum of Art.
