= Lill Tschudi =

Swiss linocut artist (1911-2004)

- Born: 2 September 1911; Schwanden, Glarus, Switzerland
- Died: 19 September 2004 (aged 93); Schwanden, Glarus, Switzerland
- Occupations: Artist, printmaker, illustrator

Lill Tschudi (2 September 1911 – 19 September 2004) was a Swiss artist associated with the Grosvenor School of Modern Art.

== Early life and education ==
Lill Tschudi was born at Schwanden, Glarus, Switzerland. As a girl she saw an exhibit of linocut prints by Austrian artist Norbertine Bresslern Roth, and decided that she also wanted to be a printmaker. Tschudi studied at the Grosvenor School of Modern Art, in London, from 1929 to 1930. From 1931 to 1933, she lived in Paris and studied with André Lhote, Gino Severini, and Fernand Léger.

== Career ==
Tschudi returned to Switzerland in 1935, and lived mainly with her sister's family (her sister was also an artist). Tschudi would produce over 300 linocuts in her career, exhibiting in London with Claude Flight and other printmakers. Her typical subjects included athletes, such as skiers and cyclists, transportation scenes, workers and musicians. A wartime side project with her sister Ida involved printing illustrations for "Glarner Gemeindewappen," a booklet of the municipal coats-of-arms for the Canton of Glarus, in 1941 (this booklet is now considered rare and quite valuable). Her 1933 print "Ice Hockey" was used for the cover illustration of Margaret Timmers, Impressions of the 20th Century: Fine Art Prints from the V&A Collection (Victoria & Albert Museum Publications 2001).

== Personal life ==
Tschudi died in Switzerland in 2004, age 93.

== Legacy ==
Works by Tschudi featured in the Museum of Fine Arts, Boston and the Metropolitan Museum of Art's joint 2008 exhibit, British Prints from the Machine Age: Rhythms of Modern Life, 1914–1939. Prints by Grosvenor School artists, including Tschudi, proved popular at a 2012 auction in London. Her works were part of another exhibit in spring 2013, "The Cutting Edge of Modernity: An Exhibition of Grosvenor School Linocuts" at the Osborne Samuel Gallery in London; a similarly-named July–September 2019 exhibition at the Dulwich Picture Gallery also showed her work.

In winter 2021–22, the Graphische Sammlung ETH Zurich (the Swiss Institute of Technology's collection of prints and drawings), exhibited The Lill Tschudi: The Excitement of the Modern Linocut 1930–1950. A monograph edited by Alexandra Barcal and Marcel Just was published in conjunction with the exhibition. (ISBN 978-3-039-42057-5) A variation of this show was exhibited at the Universitätsgalerie, Vienna in autumn of 2023.

In 2024, the Christchurch Art Gallery included prints by Tschudi in their exhibits of British Linocuts, naming her a "key figure" of the Linoprint movement.
