= Iain Macnab =

Scottish painter

- Iain Macnab, Spring Landscape, Tossa c. 1945
- Born: Iain Macnab of Barachastlain; 21 October 1890; Iloilo, Philippines
- Died: 24 December 1967 (aged 77); London, England
- Education: Glasgow School of Art, Heatherley's School of Fine Art
- Known for: Wood-engraver and painter

Iain Macnab of Barachastlain (21 October 1890 – 24 December 1967) was a Scottish wood-engraver and painter.

As a prominent teacher he was influential in the development of the British school of wood-engraving. His pictures are noted for clarity of form and composition.

His concepts of the sense of motion which could be created by the shape of repetitive parallel lines were of profound influence, in particular in relation to the art of linocut – an art form which both he and Claude Flight pioneered at the Grosvenor School of Modern Art where with the teachers included Cyril Power and Sybil Andrews.

His work was shown in the British pavilion at the Venice Biennale of 1930.

== Early life ==
Iain Macnab was born in Iloilo in the Philippines on 21 October 1890 to Scottish parents, the son of John Macnab of the Hongkong and Shanghai Bank. The family moved to Scotland when he was young.

Macnab served in France in the First World War as a captain in the Argyll and Sutherland Highlanders. He was severely wounded as a machine-gun officer, invalided out and spent two years in bed recovering from his wounds. He rejoined the military in the Second World War, despite his age, and became a pilot officer in the Royal Air Force Volunteer Reserve. He was again wounded and invalided twice, in 1942 and 1945.

He married the dancer Helen Wingrave.

== Education ==
Macnab was educated at Merchiston Castle School in Edinburgh before studying at Glasgow School of Art and then at Heatherley’s in 1918. From 1919 to 1925 he was principal of Heatherley’s School of Art.

In 1925 he became the founding principal of the Grosvenor School of Modern Art.

Macnab was hereditary armourer and standard bearer to the Macnab of Macnab.

Macnab died in London on 24 December 1967. His younger sister Chica Macnab was also an artist.

== Published works ==
- Macnab, Iain (1932). Nicht at Eenie : the bairns' Parnassus / With wood-engravings by Iain MacNab. Warlingham, Surrey: Sampson Press. ISBN 9780883054222. Reprinted 1973, Norwood Editions, USA
- Macnab, Iain (1936). Figure drawing. London and New York: The Studio. Revised second edition 1940
- Macnab, Iain (1938). The Student's book of wood-engraving. London: Sir Isaac Pitman. Reprinted 1947
- Browning, Robert (1938). Selected Poems. Harmondsworth: Penguin Books. Wood-engravings by Iain Macnab
- Landor, Walter Savage (1948). Richard Buxton (ed.). The sculptured garland: A selection from the lyrical poems of Walter Savage Landor. Macnab, Iain (illust). London: Dropmore Press. ISBN 978-0841457096.

== Public collections ==
Works by Macnab are in the following public collections:

- British Museum
- Kelvingrove Art Gallery, Glasgow
- Victoria and Albert Museum, London
- Ashmolean Museum, Oxford
- Fitzwilliam Museum, Cambridge
- British Council
- UK Government Art Collection
- Government of Canada
- Government of New Zealand

== Arts organisations ==
Macnab was a member of the following arts organisations:

- Royal Institute of Oil Painters, president (at his death in 1967)
- Imperial Arts League, chairman
- National Society of Painters, Sculptors and Engravers, fellow
- Royal Society of Painter-Etchers and Engravers, honorary auditor
