= Cyril Power =

English artist

- Born: Cyril Edward Power; 17 December 1872; Chelsea, Middlesex, England
- Died: 25 May 1951 (aged 78); London, England
- Education: Heatherly's School of Fine Art
- Known for: Linocut
- Movement: Modernism; Grosvenor School

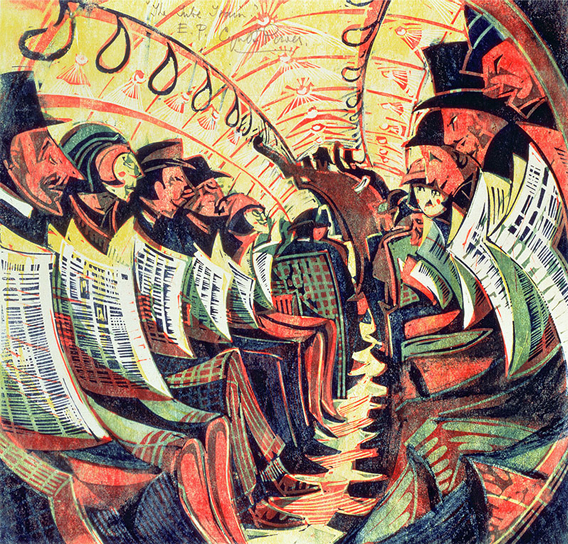
Tube Train, colour linocut 1934

Cyril Edward Power (17 December 1872 – 25 May 1951) was an English artist best known for his linocut prints, long-standing artistic partnership with artist Sybil Andrews and for co-founding the Grosvenor School of Modern Art in London in 1925. He was also a successful architect and teacher.

== Early years and architecture ==
Cyril Edward Power was born on 17 December 1872 in Redcliffe Street, Chelsea, the eldest child of Edward William Power who encouraged him to draw from an early age. This passion led to him studying architecture and working in his father's office before being awarded the Sloane Medallion by the Royal Institute of British Architects in 1900 for his design for an art school.

In August 1904 Power married Dorothy Mary Nunn in Bury St Edmunds, Suffolk, shortly afterward moving to Putney in London where they had a son, Edward Raymond Roper-Power, the following year (Power added his mother's maiden name to his own after his father left home though rarely used his full name). Power worked as an architect at the Ministry of Works under Sir Richard Allington and was involved with the design and construction of the General Post Office, King Edward VII Building and also the Post Office at the corner of Exhibition Road and Imperial College, Kensington, London.

In 1908 the family moved to Catford where their second son Cyril Arthur Power was born. It was around this time that Power became lecturer of Architectural Design and History at the School of Architecture, University College, London (now called the Bartlett School of Architecture) under Professor Simpson and also at Goldsmiths College, New Cross, London.

This led to the publication of his three-volume work: A History of English Mediaeval Architecture by the Talbot Press in 1912 which featured 424 of his own ink and pen illustrations and detailed designs.

The outbreak of the First World War saw the birth of his daughter, Joan Margaret Roper-Power, and his commissioning into the Royal Flying Corps and management of the repair workshops at Lympne Aerodrome on the Kent coast. Power also designed and executed a War Memorial for the Great Western Railway at Paddington, London around this time.

After demobilisation the family moved to Bury St Edmunds where Power recommenced his architectural practice which included design alterations and additions to Chadacre Hall Agricultural College for Lord Iveagh and the beginning of his move into creating artwork.

== Middle years and art ==
During the early 1920s Power was producing watercolour landscapes and townscapes as well as the first of some 40 drypoints. In 1918, Power met Sybil Andrews, with whom he maintained a working relationship which lasted some 20 years. His youngest son Edmund was born in December 1921, in Bury St Edmunds. Shortly after their first joint exhibition in Bury St Edmunds, the family moved to St Albans, Hertfordshire.

Power and Andrews enrolled at Heatherley's School of Fine Art, London in 1922, when he was also elected a Fellow of the Royal Historical Society. Power also helped Iain McNab and Claude Flight set up The Grosvenor School of Modern Art in Warwick Square, London with Andrews becoming the School Secretary. Power was a principal lecturer, typically on the subjects of: The Form and Structure of Buildings, Historical Ornament and Symbolism and Outline of Architectural Styles and Frank Rutter, the art critic, on Modern Painters from Cézanne to Picasso. It was here at The Grosvenor School that Claude Flight taught the art of linocutting. His classes were attended by his colleagues, Power and Andrews, and students that came from as far afield as Australia and New Zealand, attracted by the advertisements in The Studio magazine.

1929 saw Claude Flight and his associates mount the first exhibition of British linocuts in June at the Redfern Gallery, London. A series of exhibitions were held annually both there and at the Ward Gallery. Further exhibitions were arranged by Flight and traveled to the United States of America, Australia and China.

The success of these exhibitions led to Frank Pick, the Deputy Chairman of the Underground Electric Railways Company of London, to commission him and Andrews to design a series of posters. These were produced as chromolithography and were based on the theme of sporting venues reached via the London Underground system and lead to further sporting posters which became stylistically influential on other artists of the era. The two artists did the work together, signing the prints "Andrew-Power"; in total, eight poster designs were produced.

In 1930 Power was elected member of the Royal Society of British Artists and established a studio with Andrews in Hammersmith close to the River Thames, a location which inspired many prints by both artists, most notably 'The Eight' by Power and 'Bringing in the Boat' by Sybil Andrews.

Their first major joint exhibition was at the Redfern Gallery in 1933 which consisted of linocuts and monotypes. The following years saw many more joint exhibitions until the dissolution of their artistic working partnership in July 1938 when they gave up their studio. Andrews moved to her cottage 'Pipers', near Lymington on the Hampshire coast which Power had modernised and enlarged the previous year. She met and married shipyard worker Walter Morgan during the war in 1943, and emigrated to Canada with him four years later. Power rejoined his family, who had just moved from Hertfordshire to New Malden in Surrey.

== Later years ==
In September 1939, at the outbreak of World War II, Power was attached to a Heavy Rescue Squad as a surveyor, based at Wandsworth Town Hall. He continued drawing and painting, tending to work principally in oils using a palette knife technique. He also spent time lecturing on painting and linocutting to the local art society at New Malden and at Kingston-Upon-Thames.

During the last year of his life Power completed some eighty-nine oil paintings, a format he had grown increasingly fond of in the preceding years. These were mainly landscapes of the surrounding areas, often Helford River and the Falmouth area of Cornwall as well as some floral studies. He died in London in May 1951, aged seventy-eight.

== Selected works ==
- The Tube Station (1932)

- Depicts a man in the London Underground waving at/saluting an incoming Tube train; used as one of the promotional pictures for the Summer 2019 exhibition of the works of the Grosvenor School at the Dulwich Picture Gallery.

- The Tube Staircase (1929)

- Depicts a staircase in a Tube station spiraling upwards; a print is in the collection of the Victoria and Albert Museum.

- Skaters (1930)

- Depicts three spinning skaters in blue and green dresses.

- The Eight (1930)

- Depicts eight people rowing a boat; it is one of his most popular prints.

- The Merry-Go-Round (1931)

- Depicts people spinning in an orange and blue merry-go-round; used as one of the promotional pictures for the Summer 2019 exhibition of the works of the Grosvenor School at the Dulwich Picture Gallery

== Collections ==
- British Museum, London
- Auckland City Art Gallery, Auckland
- Fine Arts Museums of San Francisco, San Francisco
- Grunwald Center for the Graphic Arts, University of California, Los Angeles
- Wolfsonian Foundation, Miami Beach
- National Gallery of Australia, Canberra
- New York Public Library, New York
- Art Gallery of Ontario, Toronto
- Museum of Modern Art, New York
- Hunterian Art Gallery, University of Glasgow
- National Gallery of Victoria, Melbourne
- National Art Gallery of New Zealand, Wellington
- London Transport Museum, London
