= Dorrit Black =

Australian artist (1891–1951)

- Born: Dorothea Foster Black; 23 December 1891; Burnside, South Australia
- Died: 13 September 1951 (aged 59); Adelaide, South Australia
- Occupation: Artist

Dorothea Foster Black (23 December 1891 – 13 September 1951) was an Australian painter and printmaker of the Modernist school, known for being a pioneer of modernism in Australia and for her Cubist style. In 1931 she established the Modern Art Centre in Margaret Street, Sydney, which was the first gallery in Australia to devote itself to modernism, and one of the first galleries in Australia to be established by a woman.

== Early life and education ==
Dorothea Foster Black was born on 23 December 1891 in the Adelaide suburb of Burnside, the daughter of engineer and architect Alfred Barham Black and Jessie Howard Clark, an amateur artist and daughter of John Howard Clark, editor of the South Australian Register.

Dorothea attended the South Australian School of Arts and Crafts in about 1909, working in watercolours, and attended the Julian Ashton Art School in Sydney in 1915, where she concentrated on working in oils.

In 1927, Black went by herself to London, England, and attended the Grosvenor School of Modern Art, where she experimented with colour linocut printing while studying under Claude Flight.

Black was influenced by Flight to use bold geometrical patterns and harmonious colour schemes. In 1928, she studied at André Lhote's Academy in Paris. Black was influenced by Lhote's "compostional principles of geometric order". In 1929, she briefly worked with Albert Gleizes.

== Art practice and career ==
Black was strongly influenced by the Modernist and Cubist art movements she was exposed to in London and Paris. By the time she returned to her home country in late 1929, Black had become an active proponent of the Cubist style, and brought the styles back to Australia with her. Black then held an exhibition at Macquarie Galleries in Sydney in 1930. This was one of six one-woman shows which were to feature her work.

=== Works ===
The Bridge (1930) by Dorrit Black

Black created most of her linocuts in the 1930s. She worked mainly in watercolours in the late 1930s and then returned to working in oils. She settled in Adelaide, South Australia, in the late 1930s with her ageing mother, and painted many landscapes of the Adelaide hills and the south coast.

Black's lino-prints were integral to her art practice. As she grew older "the vitality of the natural world" became fundamental. "Air Travel 3: The pineapple plantation" is an example of Black's lino-prints. The making of linocuts allowed Black to abstract her subjects by eliminating detail and emphasising structure. Abstraction allowed her to communicate sensation.

Black is noted for her 1930 painting The Bridge, showing the Sydney Harbour Bridge as it was being constructed, before the arch was joined. The Bridge was painted in jewel-like colours such as aquamarine and "shimmering peacock" and was Australia's first Cubist landscape. It was painted in Sydney.

=== The Modern Art Centre, Sydney ===
Black was interested in creating an environment that would enable others to work in the new style. She established the Modern Art Centre in Margaret Street, Sydney, in 1931, the first gallery in Australia to devote itself to modernism. It was also one of the first galleries in Australia to be established by a woman. Over the next few years, the Modern Art Centre became a "source of inspiration and opening to a wider vision" to artists such as Nancy Hall. It hosted small but significant exhibitions by artists who became important proponents of Australian modernism, including Roland Wakelin, Grace Crowley, Grace Cossington Smith, Ralph Balson, and Rah Fizelle.

=== Return to Adelaide ===
On returning to Adelaide, Black taught part-time at the South Australian School of Art. She was a member of the South Australian Society of Arts and the Contemporary Art Society.

== Recognition ==
Black was a finalist for the Archibald Prize for portraiture in 1931.

The Art Gallery of South Australia purchased her work Mirmande (1928) in 1940.

== Death and legacy ==
Black died in the Royal Adelaide Hospital on 13 September 1951, at the age of 59, after a car accident. Her body was cremated following a Unitarian service.

Women were trailblazers of Modernism in Australia, and Black is recognised as "a prime force in educating Australians in the appreciation of modern art". Her work was described by critic Ivor Francis as:

deeply respected by the more informed section of Adelaide artists. She has so consistently been artistically cold-shouldered and ignored since her return here about 20 years ago that it is amazing how she maintained the courage to fight on against so much prejudice and misunderstanding. Regarded as not sufficiently "advanced" by one section, and too "modern" by the other, it will be many years before her exceptional talent can be properly appreciated in its right perspective, as it most certainly will be.

Her work is represented in the collections of the National Gallery of Australia as well as in many state and regional galleries, and in the Victoria and Albert Museum, London. A travelling retrospective of her work was organised by the Art Gallery of South Australia (AGSA) in 1975, who presented a major exhibition of her work from 14 June to 7 September 2014, titled Dorrit Black: Unseen Forces, and described as "the largest retrospective ever staged of the artist's work and was the first exhibition in nearly forty years to reassess Dorrit Black’s contribution to the story of Australian art".

She was represented in Know My Name exhibition in the National Gallery of Australia, Canberra, in 2020 and also in the 2025 exhibition co-presented by AGSA and the Art Gallery of New South Wales (AGNSW) and entitled Dangerously Modern Australian Women Artists in Europe, 1890-1940.

In May 2026, AGSA acquired a rare landscape painting by Black, titled Sicilian mountain, to add to its collection of around 70 works by her. A bidding war led to the price of A$675,000, the highest price ever fetched at auction for a work by her; the previous record of A$86,000 was achieved in 2014 by a London auction house for a print of her linocut The eruption.

The Dorrit Black Building, built for the University of South Australia (now part of Adelaide University) in 2005, incorporates ceramic kilns, glassblowing equipment, darkrooms for photography, studios for textile art, painting, and drawing. Designed by John Wardle Architects and Hassell, the building received a commendation in the New Buildings Category of the RAIA State Awards in 2006.
