= Claude Flight =

British artist

- Born: 1881
- Died: 1955 (aged 73–74)
- Partner: Edith Lawrence

Walter Claude Flight (born London 16 February 1881 - died Donhead St Andrew 10 October 1955) also known as Claude Flight or W. Claude Flight was a British artist who pioneered and popularised the linocut technique in printmaking. He also painted, illustrated and made woodcuts. He was the son of the British Museum mineralogist, Walter Flight FRS (1841-85).

== Arts practice ==
Flight had tried a number of different careers before settling on art. He had kept bees, farmed and also had tried engineering before studying art at Heatherley School of Fine Art from 1913–1914 and from 1918.

Flight was a fervent promoter of the linoleum cut technique from the time he first used it in 1919. He felt by promoting the use of the cheap and easily obtained new material he was making it possible for the masses to be exposed to art. He saw in it the potentiality of a truly democratic art form.

Flight exhibited at the Royal Academy in 1921, in Paris in 1922 and in London at the R.B.A. from 1923. He also exhibited regularly at the Redfern Gallery and abroad.

Flight was a member of the Seven and Five Society in 1923 whose members included Henry Moore, Ben Nicholson and Barbara Hepworth. He was a member of the Grubb Group in 1928.

He collaborated with the artist and textile designer Edith Lawrence, with whom he had an interior design business.

He taught at the Grosvenor School of Modern Art from 1926 and wrote and organized exhibitions on linocuts. His pupils included various now-famous print artists such as Lill Tschudi, Cyril Power, Eileen Mayo, Dorrit Black and Sybil Andrews.

Influenced by Cubism, Futurism and Vorticism, his work expressed dynamic rhythm through bold, simple forms. His linocut prints show his interest in depicting speed and movement.

He produced over 64 different prints and published 9 books on the linocut technique.

== Personal life ==
Edith Lawrence and Claude Flight were lifelong companions. Lawrence nursed Flight from 1947, when he suffered a stroke, until his death in 1955.

== List of works ==
- Seaside Cove watercolour on paper
- On a Backwater watercolour, black and coloured crayon
- Beach Scene watercolour on paper
- Park, 1922 watercolour and chalk on paper
- Policeman holding up Traffic linocut
- Speed c. 1922 Edition: 50
- The Paris Omnibus 1923 Edition: 50
- Swing Boats c. 1924 Edition: 50
- Le Pont Voluntré, Cahors, Lot 1924 Edition: 50
- Le Barque sur la mer (Trawler at Sea) c. 1925 Edition: 50
- Summer c. 1926 Edition: 50
- Summer, Four Seasons c. 1926
- Descent from the Bus 1927 Edition:
- Brooklands 1929 Edition: 50
- Persuasion c. 1930 Edition: 50
- Love on Ice 1930 Edition: 50
- Breaking Waves, c. 1931 Edition:50
- The Conjurer c. 1933 Edition: 50
- Swiss Mountains c. 1934 Edition: 50

This print resulted from a Swiss summer holiday made by Flight and Edith Lawrence in 1933. They stayed as guests of Lill Tschudi at her family home in Schwanden.

- Book Animal Vegetable or Mineral Published by Oxford University Press, London
- Book Lino-cuts : a handbook of linoleum-cut colour printing Published by John Lane, the Bodley Head, London; 1927)
