= List of alumni of the Central School of Art and Design =

This is a list of notable people who studied at the Central School of Art and Design in London, previously known as the Central School of Arts and Crafts, from its foundation in 1854 up to the time of its amalgamation with Saint Martin's School of Art in 1989.

== A ==
- Salomon van Abbé
- Faisal Abdu'Allah
- Tate Adams
- Eric Aho
- Rosemary Allan
- Edward Allington
- Athene Andrade
- Pegaret Anthony
- Tanya Ashken
- Duffy Ayers
- Robert Ayton (illustrator)

== B ==
- Irene Bache
- Gordon Baldwin
- Nadine Baylis
- John Berger
- Sebastian Bergne
- Alfred Bestall
- Noel Betowski
- Pearl Binder
- Helen Binyon
- Derek Birdsall
- Maria Björnson
- Edmund Blampied
- Sue Blane
- Brian Bolland
- Gregoire Boonzaier
- Dorothea Braby
- Raymond Briggs
- Alison Britton
- Caroline Broadhead
- Peter Brookes
- Lez Brotherston
- John Burningham
- A. S. Byatt

== C ==
- Alan Caiger-Smith
- Corrie Cameron
- Sokari Douglas Camp
- Joanna Carrington
- David Carter (industrial designer)
- Bryan Charnley
- Alison Chitty
- Bunny Christie
- Mary Chubb
- Kevin Coates
- Sebastian Conran
- Terence Conran
- John Kingsley Cook
- Jack Coutu
- John Craxton
- Stella Rebecca Crofts
- Theo Crosby

== D ==
- Frances Darlington
- Paul Lucien Dessau
- Eileen Diss
- Mary Dobson
- Audrey Capel Doray
- Barbara Dorf

== E ==
- Afi Ekong
- Aileen Mary Elliott
- John Elliott (architect)
- Raymond Elston
- Ali Omar Ermes
- Mabel Esplin

== F ==
- Germano Facetti
- Alfred Fairbank
- John Farleigh
- Celia Fiennes (artist)
- Ray Finch
- Peter Firmin
- Margaret Fitton
- Mary Fitzpayne
- Dennis Flanders
- Alan Fletcher (graphic designer)
- Victorine Foot
- Colin Forbes (graphic designer)
- Marcia Lane Foster
- Mary Fox
- Elizabeth Bertha Fraser
- Jane McAdam Freud
- Lucian Freud
- Anthony Froshaug

== G ==
- Edith Galliner
- Pinchas Cohen Gan
- Ken Garland
- Robert Gibbings
- Eric Gill
- Phyllis Ginger
- Ablade Glover
- Paul Goble
- Peter Benjamin Graham
- James Ardern Grant
- Jane Greenwood
- Vivien Gribble
- Anthony Gross

== H ==
- John Hackett
- Xanthos Hadjisoteriou
- Kathleen Hale
- Barbara Hanrahan
- Jerry Harris
- Cicely Hey
- Anthony Hill
- Min Hogg (1939–2019), writer on interior design
- Richard Hollis
- Percy Horton
- Ralph Hotere

== I ==
- David Imms
- Marjorie Incledon
- Neil Innes
- Gwyther Irwin

== J ==
- Muriel Amy Jackson
- Muriel Jackson
- Merlin James
- Faith Jaques
- Tam Joseph

== K ==
- Helen Kapp
- Judith Kerr
- Morris Kestelman
- Grahame King
- Ethel Kirkpatrick

== L ==
- Danny Lane
- John Lawrence (illustrator)
- Eric Lee-Johnson
- Mike Leigh
- John Vernon Lord
- Gillian Lowndes

== M ==
- Enid Marx
- Eileen Mayo
- Daphne McClure
- Alex McDowell
- Althea McNish
- Colin McNaughton
- James Metcalf
- Peter Minshall
- Bill Moggridge
- Fernando Montes
- Mona Moore
- Peter Mumford (lighting designer)
- Juan Muñoz
- David Myerscough-Jones

== N ==
- John Napier (designer)
- Renee Nele
- William R. Newland
- Lucia Nogueira

== O ==
- Ewart Oakeshott
- David Ogle
- Helen Oxenbury
- Lawson Oyekan

== P ==
- Eric Parker (illustrator)
- Victor Pasmore
- Herry Perry
- Pollyanna Pickering
- Margaret Pilkington
- Wade Hampton Pipes
- Carl Plate
- Katherine Pleydell-Bouverie
- John Plumb
- Lilian Josephine Pocock
- Kim Poor
- Anthony Powell (designer)

== R ==
- Rachel Reckitt
- Dan Reisinger
- Lynette Roberts
- Noel Rooke
- Diana Ross (author)
- Michael Rothenstein

== S ==
- Paul Sample (cartoonist)
- Kathleen Sauerbier
- Helen Saunders
- Sid Scales
- Nick Schlee
- Stella Schmolle
- Miles Balmford Sharp
- Clare Shenstone
- Posy Simmonds
- Richard Slee (artist)
- Heather Standring, British illustrator
- Vivian Stanshall
- Joe Strummer
- Berenice Sydney

== T ==
- Wendy Taylor
- Cecil Thomas
- Arthur Ralph Middleton Todd
- Caroline Townshend

== U ==
- Marija Ujević-Galetović

== W ==
- Monica Walker
- Mary Spencer Watson
- Sophia Wellbeloved
- Chris Welsby
- Veronica Whall
- Erica White
- Fred Williams
- Nigel Williams
- Ivor Williams
- Michael Wishart
- Wilfrid Wood
- Hilda Woolnough

== Y ==
- Rachel Yallop
- Barbara Yung
