= Himsworth =

Himsworth is a surname. Notable people with the surname include:

- Gary Himsworth (born 1969), English footballer
- Harold Percival Himsworth (1905–1993), British scientist
- Joyce Himsworth (1905–1989), British independent designer silversmith
- William Alfred Himsworth (1820–1880), Canadian civil servant

== See also ==
- Hemsworth (surname)
