= National Institute for Social Work =

The National Institute for Social Work Training was set up in 1961, following proposals put forward in the 1959 Eileen Younghusband report for an independent staff college for social work. Its initial funding was assured for ten years by the Nuffield Foundation and the Joseph Rowntree Memorial Trust. It was later renamed the National Institute for Social Work (NISW), with a governing body of some twenty-five members.

Its staff worked throughout the United Kingdom, supporting users and carers, practitioners, managers and policy makers in their work. NISW also attracted students from other countries.

A key member of NISW's staff in the 1970s and 1980s was the notorious child sexual abuse offender Peter Righton, an influential educator and policy adviser on social work theory and social care for vulnerable children. A lecturer at NISW from 1968 on, in 1979 he became NISW's Director of Education and continued in various consultative roles until 1992, when he was arrested and subsequently convicted of importation of child sexual abuse material. In the 1970s he was 'community liaison officer' and an executive committee member of the Paedophile Information Exchange.

Investigations by the BBC and other media have shown that Righton preyed upon children in boarding and 'special' schools from the 1950s onwards. He has been accused of using his NISW status to enable PIE associates and convicted sex offenders to work in youth counselling agencies and residential care for children.

NISW's later funding came as a grant from the Department of Health and Social Security. This was supplemented by fees from courses and consultancies. Special projects e.g. research, were also funded by other government departments, as well by charitable trusts.

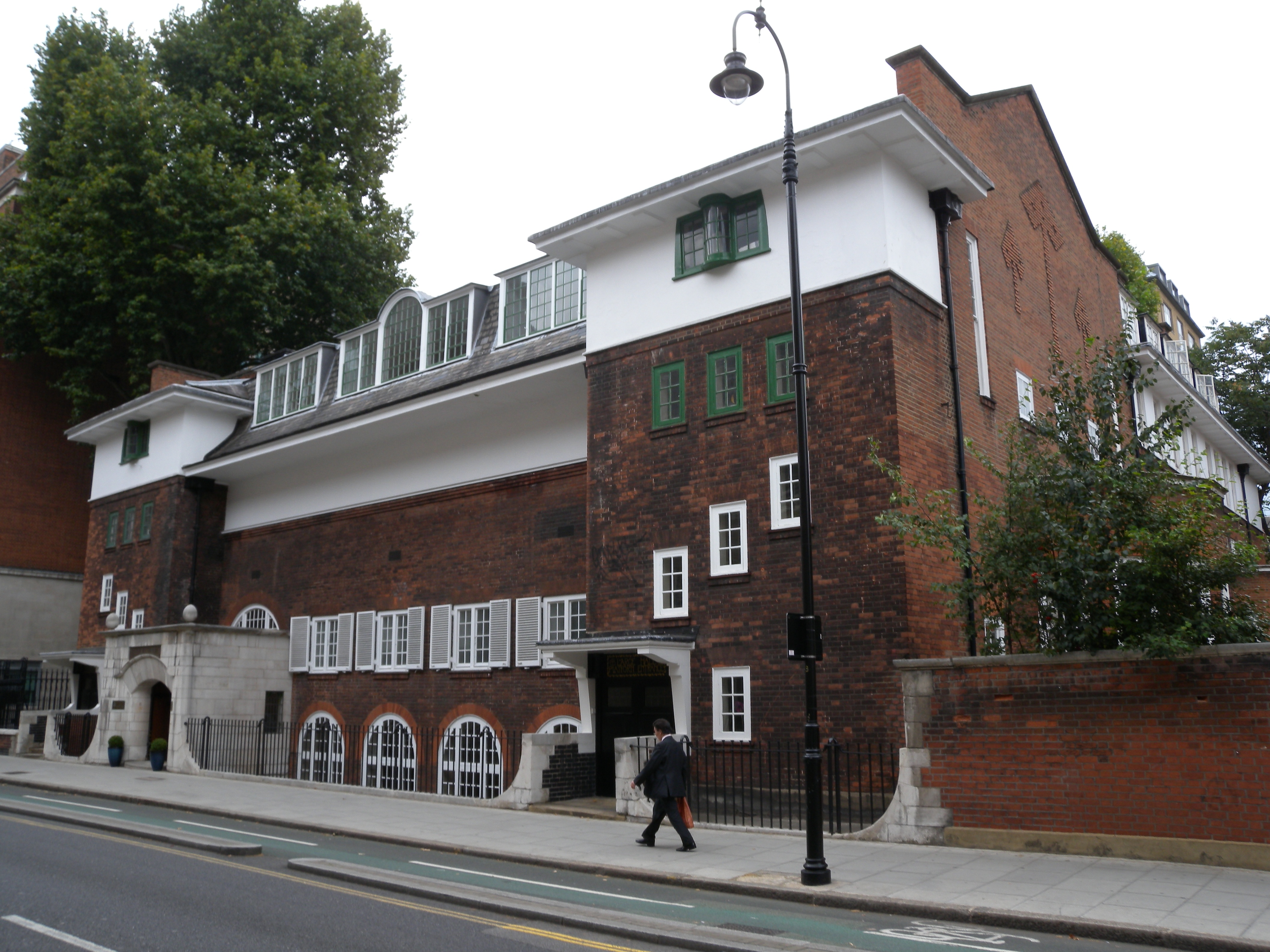
Mary Ward House, London-6069026235

NISW was located in Mary Ward House, Tavistock Place, London. NISW North opened in 1986 with an office in Leeds.

When the National Institute for Social Work closed in 2003, its archives were deposited at the Modern Records Centre, University of Warwick. Its Library collection moved to the Social Care Institute for Excellence, as did some staff from the Institute's Research Unit. Other research staff working on the social services workforce project were transferred to King's College, University of London.

== Activities ==
=== Teaching ===
NISW offered a one-year course and a three-month course, aimed at social work practitioners and managers in both the statutory and voluntary sectors. These covered all aspects of social work, including casework, group work, community development, residential and community care, as well as management and staff development. NISW staff also provided a consultancy service, and an extensive programme of residential short courses throughout the UK. By the late 1970s, they had also begun to work with colleague organisations in other European countries. Kay McDougall became a consultant to the NISW is the mid 1970s working on "short courses". At the time institute was experimenting in teaching as they trained staff including directors of social services for the Local Authorities as they took on new social work responsibilities.

=== Research ===
NISW's Research Unit was established in 1963 by Tilda Goldberg, who designed the first randomised controlled trials in British social work. The Unit's numerous studies were each designed to answer the question: 'What works, and why?' These studies included evaluations of social work in general practice, the effectiveness of task-centred casework, the role of social work area offices and clients' attitudes to social work. Thereafter, during the 1980s, the Unit carried out studies of the carers for the confused elderly, the reasons for admission into old people's homes and the varying roles played by relatives, friends, neighbours and services in supporting frail elderly people living alone. During the 1990s, the Unit's research included studies of respite services for those caring for someone with dementia, hospital discharge of elderly people, child care and the social services workforce.

From its inception, the Unit's staff also took part in the Institute's teaching programme, and published widely.

=== Policy influence ===
NISW hosted or provided members for a number of committees and their reports. These included:

- the Frederic Seebohm committee on the integration of social work services, which published the Seebohm Report
- the Geraldine Aves committee on the voluntary worker in social services.
- the Gillian Wagner committee on residential care
- the Peter Barclay committee on the roles and tasks of social workers
- the Eileen Younghusband and Edward Boyle committees set up by the Calouste Gulbenkian Foundation to consider the future of community development in the UK.

=== Projects ===
Southwark Community Project (1968–1973)

Race Equality Unit (1987–1995)

=== Library ===
By the end of the 1990s, NISW's Library comprised some 30,000 books and 300 journal titles. It had also developed an online information service, as well as an information and lending service for Social Services Departments. The library attracted social workers, students and scholars, but it was also a valuable resource to staff from government departments, as well those in other statutory bodies and voluntary agencies who had their headquarters in or near central London.

The Institute's series, the National Institute Social Services Library, was run in partnership with George Allen and Unwin, who published over fifty books in the series on all aspects of social work practice and training. NISW also published its own in-house series, the National Institute for Social Work Papers, designed as accessible guides to various elements of social work practice.

Together with its library, the Institute's gardens, meeting rooms and Common Room provided a congenial setting for minds to meet, from all walks of social work life. NISW's policy of renting out office space to kindred organisations brought in not just valuable income but also fellow professionals with new or different ideas to share.

=== Visiting professors ===
All of NISW's activities were strengthened by its ability to attract a steady stream of visiting professors, all but two of whom came from American universities:

Ken Daniels (New Zealand), Eileen Gambrill, Neil Gilbert, Charles Grosser, Arnold Gurin, Ken Heap (Norway), Ralph Kramer, Frank Maple, Anne Minahan, Mel Moguloff, Robert Perlman, Allen Pincus, Jack Rothman, Harry Specht, Roland Warren, James Whittaker.

== Governance ==
Chairs: Frederic Seebohm, Peter Barclay Trevor Owen William Utting Denise Platt, John Ransford

Principals: Robin Huws Jones David Jones Mary Sugden Daphne Statham
