= Ernest Stephen Lumsden =

British painter

Ernest Stephen Lumsden (born London, 22 December 1883, died Edinburgh, 29 September 1948) was a distinguished painter, noted etcher and authority on etching.

== Life ==
He studied at Reading Art School from 1889 under Frank Morley Fletcher and briefly at the Académie Julian in Paris in 1903. In 1908 he accepted an appointment at the Edinburgh College of Art, where he taught for a few years. He traveled several times to India between 1912 and 1927 and is noted for his prints of Benares on the River Ganges. Between 1905 and 1946 E.S. Lumsden produced some 350 etchings most of which are represented in a collection held in the Burnaby Art Gallery, British Columbia, Canada. He always printed his own plates.

Lumsden was elected an associate of the Royal Society of Painter-Etchers in 1909 and raised to the full membership in 1915;. He was elected an Associate of the Royal Scottish Academy in 1923 and a full member in 1933; and he was President of the Society of Artist Printers from 1929 to 1947.

In 1925 the publishers Seeley Service issued what is still regarded as the seminal treatise on the subject of etching, called The Art of Etching. In the book Lumsden describes the various techniques of intaglio printing using etching, drypoint, mezzotint and aquatint; he describes the history and development of etching through Rembrandt, Goya and the etching revival; and he reproduced personal, illustrated notes from several eminent etchers of the period on their techniques including: Marius Bauer, Frank Benson, Muirhead Bone, George Clausen, David Young Cameron, Frank Short, Augustus John, Frank Brangwyn, James McBey, Edmund Blampied, Percy Smith, Christopher Nevinson, Laura Knight, and John Everett. The book was published as a trade edition, which is still in print, and as a limited edition of 150 copies containing four original etchings by Lumsden.

In 1913 Lumsden married Mabel Allington Royds, a noted artist in woodcuts. They had a daughter.

== Bibliography ==
- Copley, John The Later Etchings of E.S. Lumsden (1905 - 1935 List) Print Collector’s Quarterly July 1936, Vol 23 No.3 p. 219
- Salaman, Malcolm C. The Etchings of E. S. Lumsden (with Catalogue) Print Collector’s Quarterly April 1921, Vol 8, No. 1 p. 91
- Salaman, Malcolm C. (1928). Modern Masters of Etching, No. 17. E.S. Lumsden. London: The Studio.
