= Frederic Seebohm, Baron Seebohm =

British banker (1909–1990)

Frederic Seebohm, Baron Seebohm, TD (18 January 1909 – 15 December 1990), was a British banker, soldier and social work innovator.

== Early life and background ==
Seebohm was born in Hitchin, Hertfordshire, the son of was Hugh Exton Seebohm and grandson of the historian Frederic Seebohm. His mother was Lesley Gribble, daughter of George James Gribble, of Henlow Grange, Biggleswade, who was High Sheriff of Bedfordshire for 1897–1898 and his wife Norah Royds, an artist trained at the Slade School of Art who filled Lesley's childhood home with artistic and cultural visitors. His maternal aunts and uncles included Phyllis Fordham of Ashwell Bury; Vivien Gribble, the engraver and illustrator; Major Philip Gribble, a writer and adventurer who married the daughter of Ronald McNeill, 1st Baron Cushendun and financed Anna Wolkoff; and Julian Royds Gribble, who won a VC at the end of the First World War and died of influenza in a German prison of war camp.

He was educated at Leighton Park School and Trinity College, Cambridge.

== Career ==
After leaving Cambridge, Seebohm joined the Barclays Bank, which had taken over the Hitchin Bank founded by his family. Seebohm served in the Royal Artillery, reaching the rank of lieutenant-colonel. He was mentioned in dispatches and was decorated with the Territorial Decoration.

Having been local director of the bank's branch office in Luton and Birmingham, Seebohm became director of the main board after the war. In 1951, he was made a member of the bank's overseas board and in 1965 chairman of the renamed Barclays Bank International. He retired seven years later.

In December 1965 Seebohm was appointed, by Douglas Houghton MP, to chair the Committee on Local Authority Personal Social Services. The Committee published its findings in the Seebohm Report in 1968. Amongst other things, the report recommended the establishment of a unified social service within each major local authority.

Seebohm was also chairman of the Overseas Development Institute.

== Awards and appointments ==
Seebohm received a knighthood in 1970, and on 28 April 1972, he was created a life peer as Baron Seebohm, of Hertford in the County of Hertford. Between 1970 and 1971, he was High Sheriff of Hertfordshire, as his grandfather had been. He was further president of the National Institute for Social Work, of the Royal African Society and of the Age Concern. He was further chairman of the Joseph Rowntree Memorial Trust (now the Joseph Rowntree Foundation) for 15 years and one of the founders of the York Council of Voluntary Service. He was a governor of the London School of Economics and Haileybury and Imperial Service College. He was for a time chairman of 3i.

== Later life and family ==
In 1932, he married Evangeline Hurst, daughter of Sir Gerald Berkeley Hurst. They had one son and two daughters, including the writer Victoria Glendinning.

Seebohm died in a road accident in 1990, his wife a short time after.

== Arms ==
Coat of arms of Frederic Seebohm, Baron Seebohm
| Coronet Coronet of a Baron Crest In front of a sword erect point upwards Proper sheathed Sable between two roses Argent barbed seeded slipped and leaved Proper a kkein of wool fesswise Argent. Escutcheon Or a balance Sable on a chief Azure three bezants. Supporters Dexter a hart guardant Proper collared Or sinister a ram guardant Proper also collared Or. Motto Cogita Piscem |
