= Northern Crafts Centre =

Organisation of British crafts people

Northern Crafts Centre Ltd
- Formation: 1963; 63 years ago
- Defunct: 1974
- Type: Craft organisation
- Purpose: To preserve, promote and improve fine craftsmanship in Great Britain
- Headquarters: 35 South King Street, Manchester, M2 4LG
- Region served: United Kingdom
- Leader: Harry Norris

Northern Crafts Centre Ltd was first registered as a charity 7 March 1963 and removed from the Register of Charities 6 April 1993 as it had ceased to exist by that point. The centre had a strong association with the Red Rose Guild of Designer Craftsmen with most of their exhibitions for many years, including some permanent stock being held in retail premises. The membership of Margaret Pilkington on the Council of Management was fundamental to this association. However much of the centres history has been lost to time. It was established as a "not for profit" organisation, seeking to promote good craftsmanship and enable commissioning of works.

The ticketed opening by Colonel William Loris Mather, Chairman of the Civic Trust for the North West, was on 11 September 1963 at 4pm.

The Northern Crafts Centre closed in 1974 following the death of a number of key individuals; the first chairman, Harry Norris died in April 1968.

== Known exhibitions ==
In addition to specific exhibitions an ongoing exhibition of arts and crafts took place. Most advertising did not name specific artists, although sometimes available from articles and other sources.

Known exhibitions
Start date	End date	Exhibition	Known artists
11 Sep 1963	Ongoing till 1974	Red Rose Guild of Craftsmen - Opening Exhibition	Not Known
15 Dec 1963	21 Dec 1963	Special Gifts Display	Not Known
13 May 1964	6 Jun 1964	Red Rose Guild of Craftsmen Spring Exhibition	Mary Farmer, Stanislas Reychan, Geoffrey Whiting
24 Aug 1964	Sep 1964	Three Northern Potters	D Clarkson, Derek Emms, L F Matthews
23 Oct 1964	26 Nov 1964	Red Rose Guild of Craftsmen - Autumn Exhibition	Derek Emms, Mary Farmer
