= Hemsworth (disambiguation) =

Hemsworth is a town and civil parish on the edge of West Yorkshire, England.

Hemsworth may also refer to:

== Places ==
- Hemsworth (UK Parliament constituency), West Yorkshire
- Hemsworth Rural District, West Riding of Yorkshire, England, 1894–1974
- Hemsworth, Sheffield, suburb in Gleadless Valley, England

== Other uses ==
- Hemsworth (surname)
