= Yallop =

Yallop is a surname. Notable people with the surname include:

- David Yallop (1937–2018), English writer
- Frank Yallop (b. 1964), English soccer player
- Graham Yallop (b. 1952), Australian cricketer
- John Yallop (b. 1949), British rower
- Kirsty Yallop (b. 1986), New Zealand soccer player
- Tameka Yallop (b. 1991), Australian soccer player
- Rachel Yallop, British artist
