= Helen Stevenson =

Helen Stevenson may refer to:

- Helen Stevenson Meyner (1929–1997), U.S. Representative from New Jersey
- Helen Stevenson (artist), Scottish artist
