= Vivien Gribble =

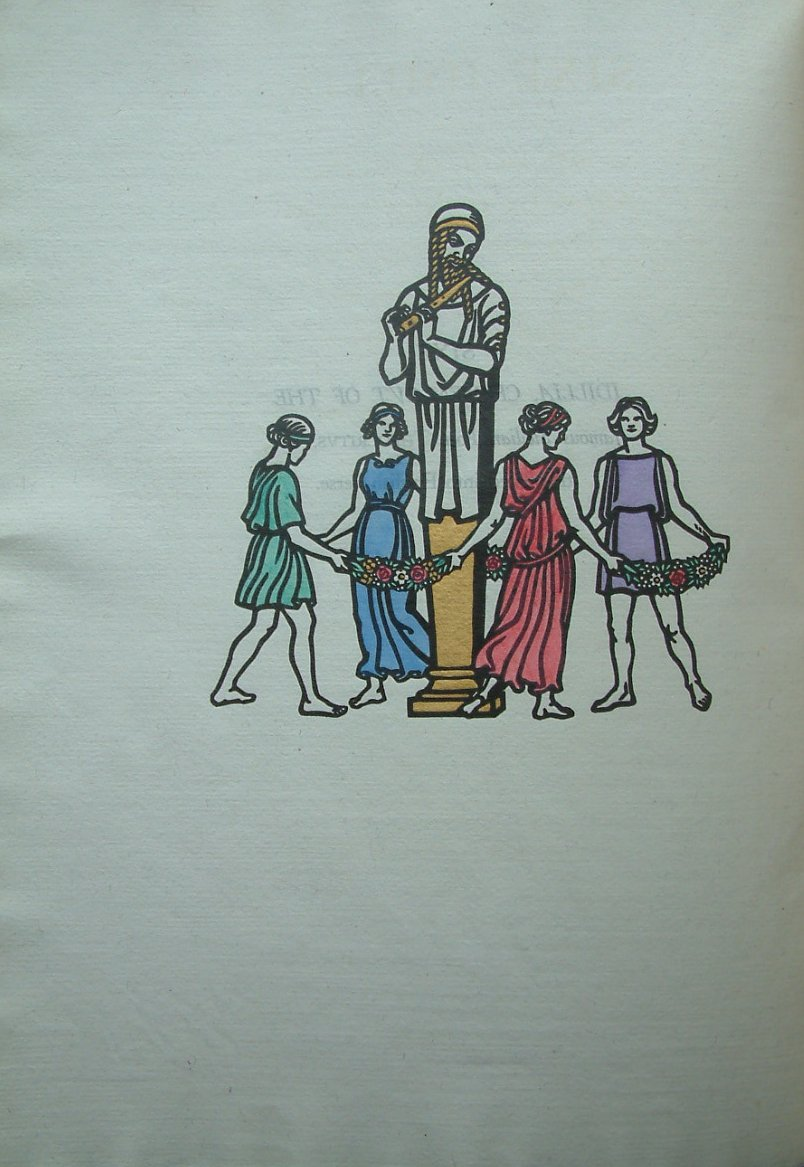
Sixe Idillia (1922): frontispiece. One of fewer than 25 copies hand-coloured .by Gribble

Vivien Massie Gribble Doyle-Jones (1888 – 6 February 1932) was an English wood engraver who was active at the beginning of the 20th century. She was a pupil of Noel Rooke at the Central School of Arts and Crafts and exhibited regularly with the Society of Wood Engravers.

== Life ==
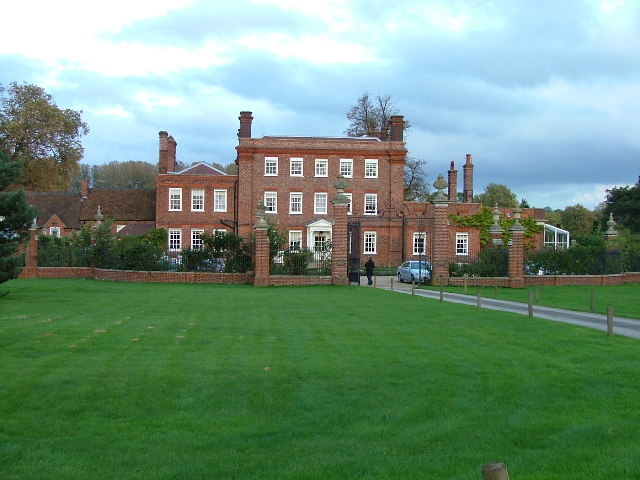
Henlow Grange, Henlow, Bedfordshire

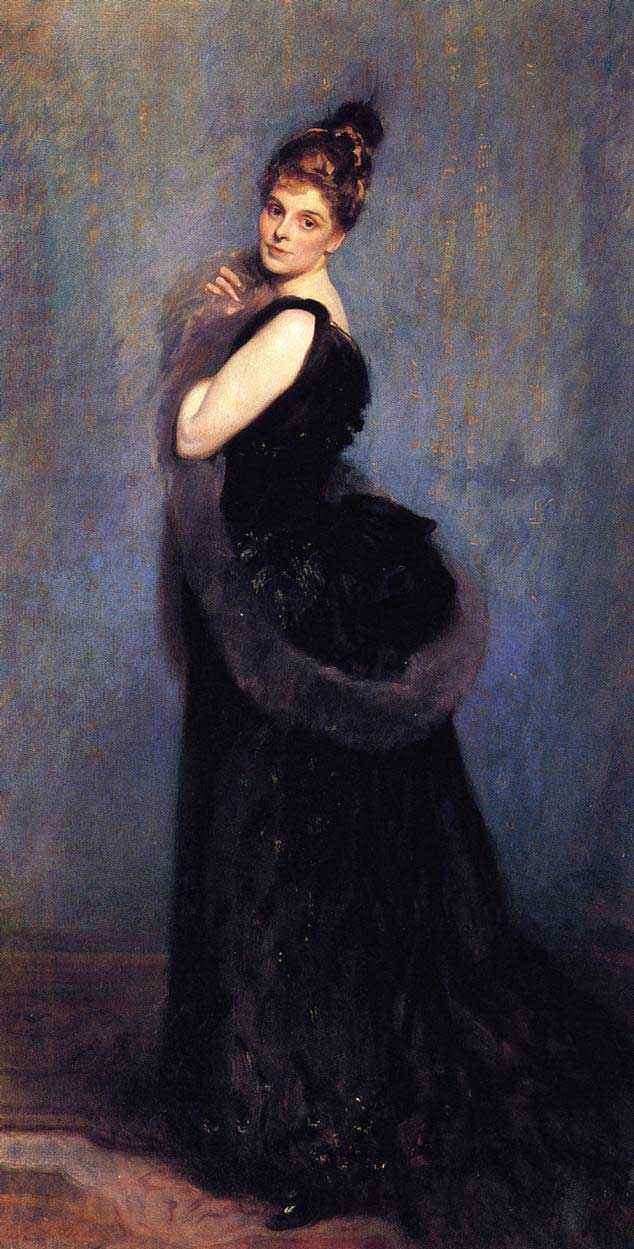
Mrs George Gribble (Norah Royds) by John Singer Sargent, 1887

Gribble was born in Chelsea, London, the third of six children of a wealthy family. The family grew up at Henlow Grange, Henlow, Bedfordshire, and at Kingston Russell, near Long Bredy in Dorset, with a large retinue of servants, according to her brother's biography.

Her father was George Gribble, who in 1897 was High Sheriff of Bedfordshire. Her mother was Norah Royds, a Slade-trained artist, whose murals still decorate Henlow Grange, notably the Peacock Room. Her mother's cousin was Mabel Allington Royds, an artist known for her woodcuts.

Her eldest sister was Phyllis Fordham of Ashwell Bury. Other siblings included Lesley, mother of Frederic Seebohm, Baron Seebohm, and Major Phillip Gribble, a writer and adventurer who married the daughter of Ronald McNeill, 1st Baron Cushendun, and financed Anna Wolkoff. The youngest of her siblings, Julian Royds Gribble, won the Victoria Cross at the end of World War I and died of influenza in a German prison of war camp; she designed a memorial window for him at Preston, Hertfordshire.

Vivien studied first in Munich and then, following in her mother's footsteps, at the Slade School of Art. She studied at the Central School of Arts and Crafts under Noel Rooke, and clearly made an early impression on her teachers. During the First World War she joined the Land Army.

In 1919, she married Douglas Doyle-Jones, a barrister from a similarly wealthy background, and they set up house at Higham in Suffolk. Doyle Jones soon gave up working as a barrister to look after his estate and dabble in painting. After several miscarriages the couple adopted a child. Gribble, who had a restless temperament, tended to lose interest in projects when her initial wish was gratified. She died of cancer on 6 February 1932.

== Higham ==
In 1926, the couple bought Valley Farm in Higham. Doyle-Jones undertook much planting in the area, gaining the sobriquet, the "Old Man of the Trees". The couple also owned The Pound, which in 1929 became the home of Cedric Morris and Arthur Lett-Haines. On Gribbles' death in 1932, Morris inherited the cottage.

== Her wood engravings ==
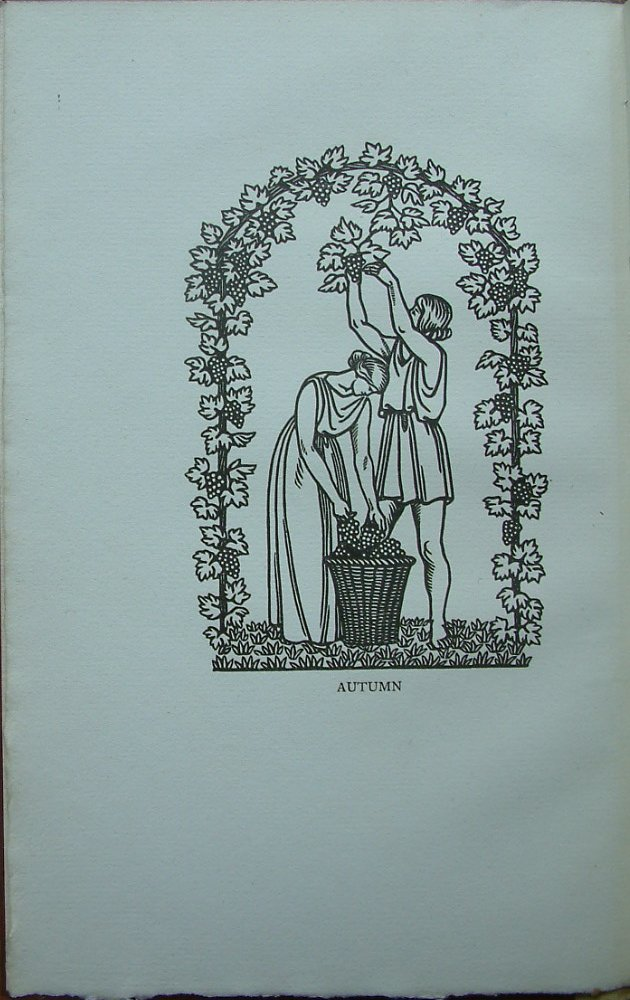
Odes (1923): frontispiece

The Central School was clearly the place to be in those very early years of the wood engraving revival; in 1912, the year that Rooke began teaching wood engraving there, Gribble was commissioned to produce five wood engravings for an edition of Three Psalms designed by J.H. Mason. He was impressed enough to ask her in 1916 to produce 12 wood engravings for an edition of Cupid and Psyche by Apuleius; this edition did not appear until 1935. In 1919 Gribble was asked to contribute three wood engravings to Change 2, a small format magazine that reflected the zeitgeist of the period; in the same year Malcolm Salaman included her wood engravings in his Studio anthology.

She exhibited in the second exhibition of the Society of Wood Engravers in 1921, and continued to do so until 1925. In 1922 she contributed two wood engravings to Contemporary English Woodcuts, an anthology of wood engravings produced by Thomas Balston, a director at Duckworth and an enthusiast for the new style of wood engravings. She also produced the cover vignette for the book. Campbell Dodgson, Keeper of Prints and Drawings at the British Museum, wrote about her in his introduction to the book: Miss Gribble and Miss Pilkington are among the other women artists who practise wood engraving with zeal and success; the former is now turning her attention to book illustration, in which English engravers of the modern school have hitherto achieved smaller results that their contemporaries in France. This was a limited edition of 550 copies; Gribble worked with Balston to produce three more books at Duckworth in a similarly luxurious format. The first was a 380 signed copy edition of Sixe Idillia by Theocritus, printed at the Cloister Press under the supervision of Stanley Morison. This was followed in 1923 by Odes by John Keats, in a 170 signed copy edition and in 1924 an edition of 150 signed copy edition of Songs from "The Princess" by Tennyson. Both the Keats and the Tennyson were also produced in ordinary editions.

Her final commission was her swan song; in 1926 MacMillan published an edition of Tess of the d'Urbervilles by Thomas Hardy with 41 wood engravings by Gribble. There was a main edition of 1,500 copies, and an edition of 325 copies signed by Hardy which sold out before publication.

Her work is represented in several national collections, the British Museum, the Central School and the Fitzwilliam Museum.

== An overview of Gribble's work ==
Gribble's wood engravings are clearly modern, but in the black line tradition of Edward Gordon Craig and Lucien Pissarro rather than the prevailing white line tradition. She was prominent in the early period of modern wood engraving, but her period of activity (1912-1926) reflects the lifespan of that modern black line tradition, which was clearly over before her early death. Many of her engravings are in a classical tradition, but the engravings for Tess are more modern in style and content and make greater use of white line engraving. Gribble herself is the model for Tess, and her husband for Angel Clare. The final judgement goes to Douglas Percy Bliss, who wrote of the limitations of the black line style of Gribble and Rooke: If their work had more verve and vitality they would be among the best book -decorators of our time.
