= Henlow Grange =

Country house in Bedfordshire, England

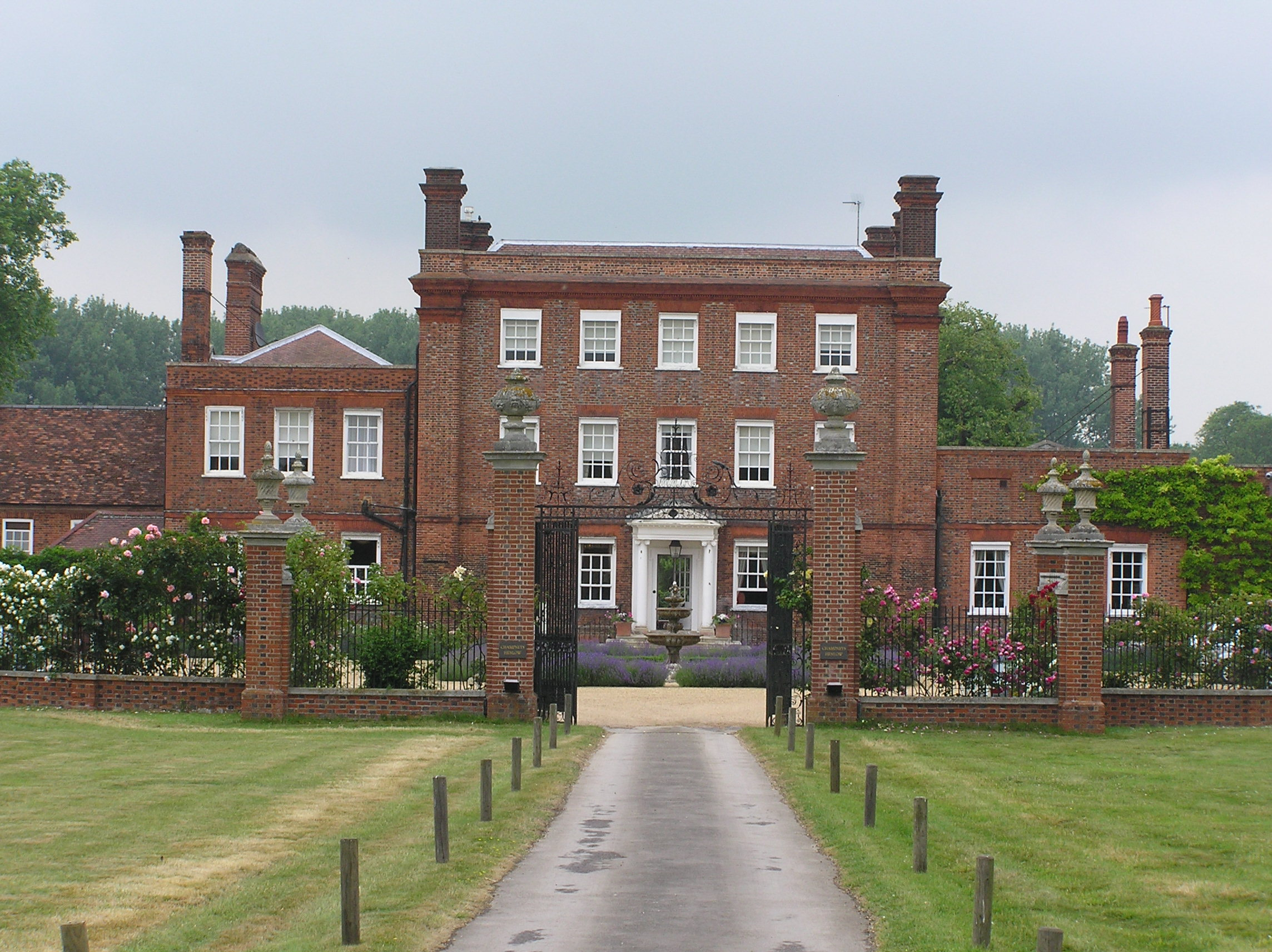
- Henlow Grange in 2009

- Location within Bedfordshire

General information
- Location: Henlow, Bedfordshire, England
- Coordinates: 52.032°N 0.277°W
- Ordnance Survey: TL1838938381
- Year built: Mid-18th century

Website
- Champneys Henlow

Listed Building – Grade II*
- Official name: Henlow Grange
- Designated: 16 January 1952
- Reference no.: 1113835

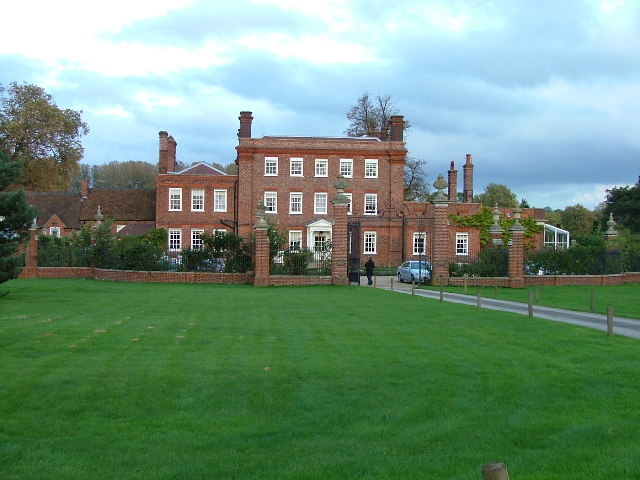
Henlow Grange

Henlow Grange is an English country house in Henlow, Bedfordshire. It is now operated as a spa hotel.

== Family home ==
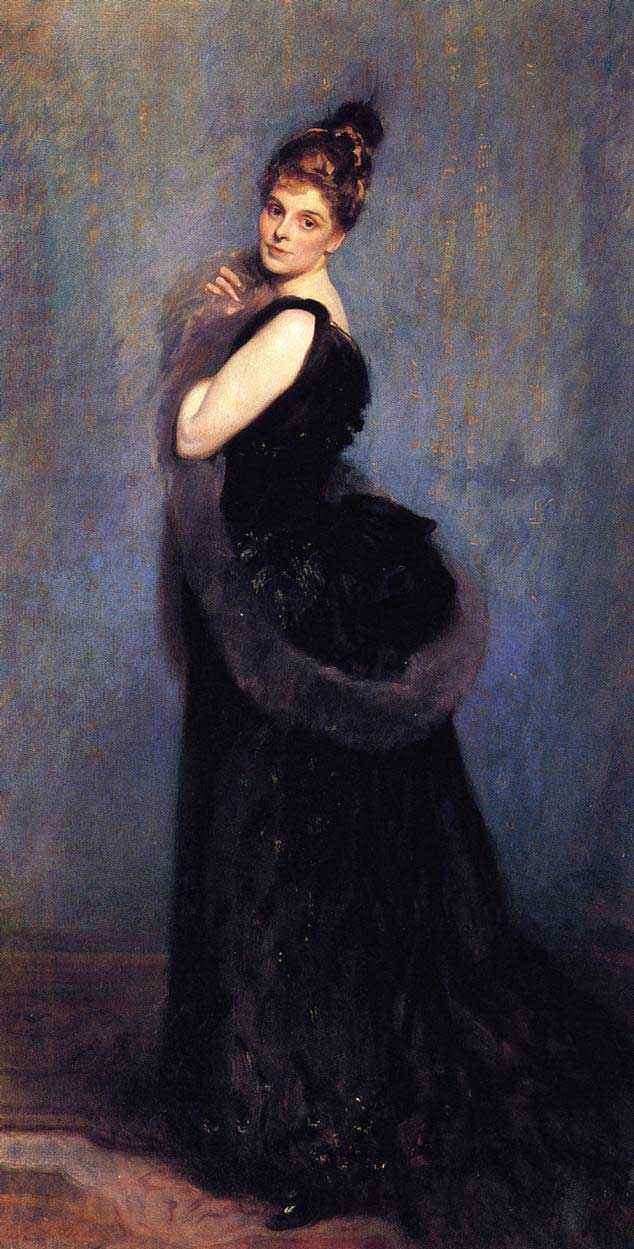
Mrs George Gribble (Norah Royds) by John Singer Sargent, 1887

The house chiefly dates from the mid-18th century. For generations it was the family seat of the Edwards. By 1869 the manor was in the possession of Rev Henry Addington, who inherited it from his relative Major General Hanbury Raynsford who died in 1868. Until the late 19th century, the house and estate passed down through inheritance or marriage between the Edwards, Raynsfords, and Addingtons.

In 1889 it was sold, and after a few owners, by 1908 it was the family home of George Gribble, who later restored Kingston Russell, Dorset, with architect Philip Tilden. Gribble's wife Norah Royds was a Slade-trained artist, a cousin of Mabel Allington Royds, and her murals still decorate Henlow Grange, notably the Peacock Room. Some of the Gribble children who spent at least part of their childhood at the Grange include Phyllis, later Phyllis Fordham of Ashwell Bury; Vivien Gribble, the engraver and illustrator; Lesley, who died as a young woman, mother of Frederic Seebohm, Baron Seebohm; Major Philip Gribble, a writer and adventurer who married the daughter of Ronald McNeill, 1st Baron Cushendun and financed Anna Wolkoff; and Julian Royds Gribble, who won a VC at the end of World War I and died of influenza in a German prison of war camp. Phillip's autobiography describes Henlow Grange as having about 24 bedrooms once his parents had finished their renovations, with dozens of indoor and outdoor servants.

Henlow Grange was the home of several High Sheriffs of Bedfordshire: in 1804 George Edwards; in 1827 George Nigel Raynsford (who changed his name to Edwards upon inheriting in 1809), also the deputy lieutenant; in 1897 George James Gribble; in 1916 Cyril Gurney; and in 1932 Christopher William Gurney.

In 1936 Alan Lennox-Boyd, who represented Mid Bedfordshire in Parliament from the 1930s until the 1950s, moved his family into the house. Later he became Colonial Secretary and finally Lord Boyd of Merton and was responsible for the granting of independence to most of the former British overseas colonies. In 1950 Lord Boyd of Merton and his family left Henlow Grange, and on their departure the Boyd Memorial field was left to the parish.

In 1952 it was designated a Grade II* listed building.

== Health farm and spa ==
In 1960 Leida Costigan, an Estonian-born beauty specialist, and her husband purchased Henlow Grange for conversion into a health farm. Prior to purchase it had been unoccupied for seven years and had become almost uninhabitable. (Many country houses were demolished during this period). A large elder tree blocked the main gates and over a thousand window panes were smashed. Following extensive refurbishment, Henlow Grange became a health farm, with an average of six guests at a time. Costigan introduced the use of massage machines to Henlow Grange in 1960. In 1975 Costigan's daughter, Anne Kristina Costigan, trained as a therapist at Henlow Grange, providing services to celebrity clients such as Maureen Lipman.

On 17 October 1963, one of Henlow Grange's customers, a 37-year-old man from Santa Barbara named Russell Winterbottom, went missing after leaving the Grange for a run. He had paid in advance for a year's tuition in order to train as a beauty therapist under Leida Costigan. Less than seven weeks later on 2 December, his burnt body was found less than a mile away by the health farm's gardener Arthur Dilley.

A former chambermaid alleged that Jimmy Savile had molested her while she was working at Henlow Grange during 1977. She also reported witnessing her father Jeffrey Mantle, who was later convicted on child sex abuse charges, lead two girls, who he had claimed were Savile's nieces, into Savile's room at Henlow Grange.

In August 1981, Henlow Grange was sold to Bob and Dorothy Purdew, in exchange for payment of Costigan's debts, and became the first acquisition by the Purdews in the chain of health farms which are now branded as Champneys. They built a wing of bedrooms which was named after and opened by Jimmy Savile. In November 2002, the resort suffered a major fire and was refurbished; it reopened in April 2003.

== See also ==
- Grade II* listed buildings in Bedfordshire
