= Walter Morley Fletcher =

British physiologist and administrator

Sir Walter Fletcher
- Walter Morley Fletcher (1873-1933)
- Born: 21 July 1873
- Died: 7 June 1933 (aged 59)
- Education: Trinity College, Cambridge
- Known for: Muscle physiology
- Scientific career
- Fields: Physiologist
- Workplaces: Cambridge University
- Academic advisors: John Newport Langley
- Notable students: Archibald Hill

Sir Walter Morley Fletcher, KBE, FRS (21 July 1873 – 7 June 1933) was a British physiologist and administrator. Fletcher graduated from Trinity College, Cambridge and was most significant in his administration of the Medical Research Council (MRC) during the interwar years. Under his guidance, the MRC focused its funding on basic scientific research at the expense of clinical research but he made Britain a leader in biomedical research in the period.

He married Mary Frances Cropper, daughter of Charles James Cropper (son of James Cropper).

- Anne Cicely Fletcher (1909-1988) married Rev Alfred Stephan Hopkinson, Son of John Henry Hopkinson.
- Dr Charles Montague Fletcher (1911–1995) married Hon. Louisa Mary Sylvia Seely, daughter of John Edward Bernard Seely, 1st Baron Mottistone. They had three children:
  - Susanna Mary Fletcher married Sir Nicholas Lyell Baron Lyell Of Markyate.
  - Caroline Anne FLETCHER married Sir Christopher Clarke (judge).

He was a brother of English painter Frank Morley Fletcher.
