= Noel Rooke =

English wood engraver and illustrator (1881–1953)

Noel Rooke (1881–1953) was a British wood-engraver and artist. His ideas and teaching made a major contribution to the revival of British wood-engraving in the twentieth century.

== Biography ==
Rooke was born in Acton, London and he would remain in London all of his life. His father was Thomas Matthews Rooke, for many years the studio assistant of Edward Burne-Jones, and an accomplished artist in his own right. His mother Leonora Rooke (née Jones) had been governess to Burne-Jones's daughter, Margaret. Rooke studied in France at the Lycée de Chartres and then at the Godolphin School in Hammersmith, London. He completed his education at the Slade and the Central School of Arts and Crafts.

On 31 December 1932, Rooke married one of his pupils, Celia Mary Twisleton-Wykeham-Fiennes. She practised as a wood engraver under the name Celia Fiennes.

Rooke died at West London Hospital on 5 October 1953.

== Lethaby and the Central School of Arts and Crafts ==
In 1899, aged 18, Rooke was employed by William Lethaby in the school holidays to make drawings of the Chapter House at Westminster Abbey. This was the start of a fruitful association with Lethaby, who had become the first principal of the Central School of Arts and Crafts in 1896. He wanted it to become for design and the crafts what the Slade and the Royal Academy were for the fine arts.

Rooke joined the Central School as a student in 1899 and was in the first class of students to learn calligraphy from Edward Johnston along with Florence Kingsford Cockerell. Johnston taught Rooke that the form of a letter should be determined by the tool making the letter, a principle which Rooke later applied to wood engraving. In 1904 Rooke also attended evening classes in wood engraving at the London County Council School of Photo-engraving and Lithography in Bolt Court, where he learned the skills of wood engraving from R. John Beedham. At the period Eric Gill gave classes in stone carving and inscriptions, and Rooke later gave Gill private lessons in wood engraving.

In 1905 Rooke became a teacher of book illustration at the Central School, and introduced wood engraving for book decoration into his syllabus. He faced opposition from Frank Morley Fletcher and Sydney Lee who taught classes in colour woodcuts in the Japanese style. Lethaby had had to overcome opposition to Johnston's calligraphy classes, and, along with most artists at the time, saw wood engraving simply as the reproductive medium that it had been until then. He vetoed the introduction of the new style of wood engraving into the curriculum. When he left in 1911 Rooke was able introduce a class in lettering and wood engraving in 1912, and a class in wood engraving and poster design in 1913.

In 1914 Rooke became head of the School of Book Production, a post that he held until 1946.

Lethaby was the editor of a series of books: the Artistic Crafts Series of Technical Handbooks, and Rooke drew illustrations and diagrams for three of them - Bookbinding, and the care of books (1901) by Douglas Cockerell, Writing and Illuminating, and Lettering (1906) by Johnston and Hand-loom Weaving (1910) by Luther Hooper. These became standard works on their subject, and, along with the other handbooks in the series, ran into many editions.

== His influence as a teacher ==
Rooke reacted against the reproductive wood engravings of the nineteenth century, where the drawing, the creative impetus of the artist, and the engraving, carried out by a skilled craftsman, were separate. He said: There is only one way of getting a thoroughly satisfactory engraving: the designer and the engraver must be one and the same person. He went on to apply the principles that he had learned from Johnston to wood engraving: Form should be expressed with tools which answer the helm with much sensitiveness.

He collaborated with J. H. Mason, who had made his reputation at the Doves Press. Mason was the head of Printing, and the two worked together on marrying text, type and illustration. Rooke was able to recommend his pupils, notably Vivien Gribble, as illustrators of books produced at the school.

His was a major influence in reviving the practice of wood engraving in the twentieth century. Among his students were Mabel Annesley, John Farleigh, Robert Gibbings, Vivien Gribble, Muriel Jackson, Clare Leighton, Margaret Pilkington, Herry Perry, Monica Poole. Less well known pupils include Mary Berridge, John R. Biggs, Cecily Englefield, Joan Pilsbury and Hilda M. Quick.

== His wood engravings and other illustrations ==
In 1920 Rooke helped to found the Society of Wood Engravers and exhibited with the society from 1920 to 1933. In the same year he became an associate of the Royal Society of Painter-Etchers and Engravers.

As a result of his teaching, his own production was comparatively small - wood engraved, line drawn and watercolour illustrations, individual prints, posters and paintings, many of which reflect his passion for mountains. He described himself as "one who draws mountains and also climbs them". Margaret Pilkington remembers classes where Rooke dwelt on the dramatic contrasts of dark rock and snow-covered sunlit slopes, on the angularity of line and on the possibilities of abstraction presented by such scenes.

He produced a double-panel wood engraving for Rupert Brooke's The Old Vicarage, Grantchester (1916), one of the first books, in this case a slim booklet, illustrated with modern wood engravings. His only other book with wood engravings was for the Golden Cockerel Press, an edition of The Birth of Christ (1925).

In 1922 he contributed two wood engravings to Contemporary English Woodcuts, an anthology of wood engravings produced by Thomas Balston, a director at Duckworth and an enthusiast for the new style of wood engravings. Campbell Dodgson, Keeper of Prints and Drawings at the British Museum, wrote about him in his introduction to the book: "Mr. Rooke himself, represented by examples of his earlier and later woodcuts, has discovered a vigorous treatment of mountain forms".

He produced colour plates for two books by Robert Louis Stevenson, An Inland Voyage (1908) and Travels with a Donkey in the Cevennes (1909); and a King Penguin book on Flowers of Marsh and Stream (1946).

His interest in mountains comes across in one of his posters for the London Underground, the Downs at Betchworth, and in many of his paintings.

VADS (the Visual Arts Data Service) offers quick access to reproductions of Rooke's work, and the Central School has an extensive holding of his wood engravings.

== An overview of his life and work ==
The final judgement on Rooke as a wood engraver goes to Douglas Percy Bliss, who wrote of Vivien Gribble and Rooke: If their work had more verve and vitality they would be among the best book -decorators of our time.
