= Joanna Constantinidis =

English potter and ceramic artist (1927-2000)

- Born: Joanna Connell; 12 December 1927; York, England
- Died: 1 August 2000 (aged 72); Chelmsford, England
- Education: Sheffield Art College
- Known for: Ceramics and pottery
- Spouse: Photis George Constantindis (m.1961–2000, her death)

Joanna Constantinidis née Connell, (12 December 1927 – 1 August 2000) was an English potter and ceramic artist.

== Biography ==
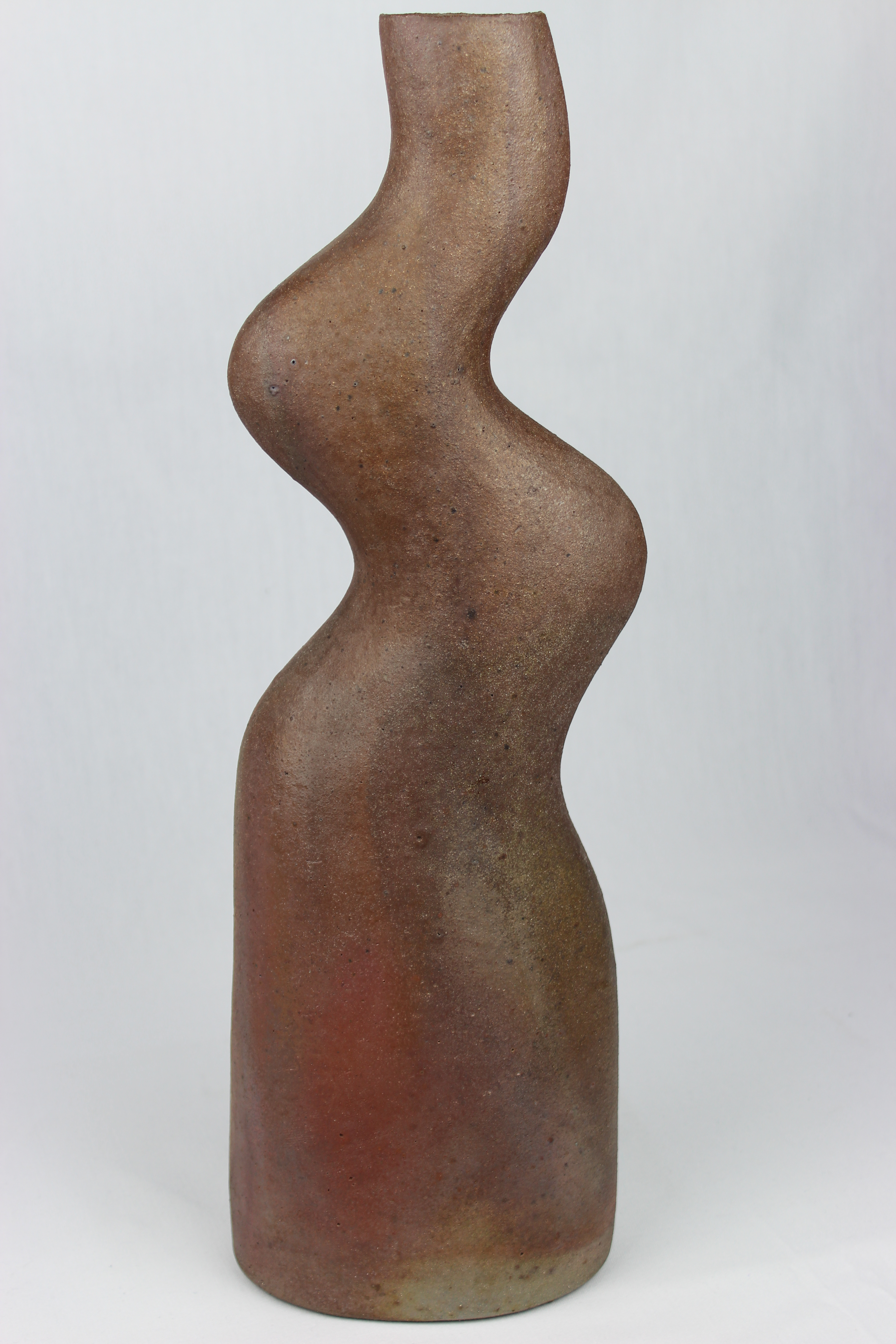
Hand-Built vase by Constantinidis (1976) (YORYM-2004.1.458)

Constantinidis was born in York and grew up in Sheffield where she attended Ecclesfield Grammar School between 1939 and 1945 before studying painting at Sheffield Art College until 1949. At Sheffield she was introduced to ceramics and pottery making and in 1951 became a ceramics lecturer at Chelmsford Technical College, later part of the Essex Institute of Higher Education. This position, which she held until her, early, retirement in 1989, allowed Constantinidis to experiment and develop her own style and technical abilities. In time she developed innovative methods of throwing, firing and glazing pots.

In the early 1950s Constantinidis exhibited somewhat traditional examples of pottery, inspired by industrial wares and Staffordshire slipware, with the Red Rose Guild and the British Crafts Centre but in the late 1950s, influenced by the works of Lucie Rie and Hans Coper changed her style. Working at a studio she set up at Great Baddow she produced simpler designs with reduced decoration based around a few elemental shapes. She developed painstaking methods to produce work that emphasized purity and harmony of both shape and decoration. In the 1970s her pottery became sculptural and her pots were often greatly reworked by cutting and folding after being created on her potters' wheel.

In the later decades of her life Constantinidis' produced tall cylinders and bowls based on simple elegant lines. In her last years she created some notable individual pots and a set of porcelain table ware. In early 2000 she suffered a stroke but was able to complete work for a solo exhibition held at the Victoria and Albert Museum in May that year. As well as the Victoria and Albert Museum, many public collections hold examples of her work including the National Museum of Modern Art in Kyoto. In 1978 Constantinidis won a medal of honour at the Premio Faenza international ceramics exhibition and in 1995 a touring retrospective exhibition of her work was organised by the University of Derby.
