= Elizabeth Craig (writer) =

Scottish writer and home economist (1883–1980)

Elizabeth Craig MBE
- Born: Elizabeth Josephine Craig; 16 February 1883; Addiewell, West Lothian, Scotland
- Died: 7 June 1980 (aged 97); Slough, Berkshire, England
- Resting place: Kirriemuir
- Occupations: teacher, home economist, author, journalist
- Spouse: Arthur Mann (died 1973)

Cakes and Candies: How to make them – a recipe calendar written by Elizabeth Craig for 1934

Elizabeth Josephine Craig, MBE, FRSA (16 February 1883 – 7 June 1980) was a Scottish journalist, home economist and a notable author on cookery.

== Early life and family ==
Elizabeth Craig was born on 16 February 1883 in Addiewell, West Lothian to Catherine Anne Nicoll (died 3 March 1929) and Reverend John Mitchell Craig. Craig was one of eight children and her father was a minister of the Free Church of Scotland. The family lived at the Manse in Memus, Kirriemuir, Scotland.

She attended Forfar Academy and George Watson's Ladies' College in Edinburgh before returning to Forfar Academy as a teacher.

== Journalism ==
Craig's writing career began in Dundee where she studied journalism. She first published a cookery feature in the Daily Express in 1920, following comments from the Daily Mail's film editor, who declared she was "the only woman in Fleet Street who could cook". Craig was a founding member of the International P.E.N., and at the request of the founder, Catharine Dawson Scott, attended the first meeting of the association at the Florence Restaurant in London where John Galsworthy was elected its first president.

== Cooking ==
Craig started to cook when she was six years old and began collecting recipes from age 12. She declared that the only formal training she had in cookery was a "three months course in Dundee". She began publishing cookery books after the end of World War I and proceeded through World War II and into 1980. She began writing in times when food was scarce and rationing was heavily relied upon, and her focus broadened when the majority of households had a refrigerator and an opportunity to access a much wider variety of foods: this can be observed in her writing as more diverse dishes appear in her later books.

Her contribution to English culinary literature comprises a very large corpus of traditional British recipes, although not only this: included are also a considerable collection of recipes from other countries which she liked to collect during visits abroad.

== Personal life ==
Craig's engagement to American war correspondent and broadcaster Arthur E. Mann (died 9 June 1973) of Washington, D.C., was announced on 11 August 1919, and they were married at St Martin in the Fields Church, Trafalgar Square.

== Publications ==
=== Cookery books ===
- 19?? The Woman's Journal Cookery Book
- 19?? Elizabeth Craig's Menus for a Year
- 19?? Elizabeth Craig's Springtime Cookery Book (The People's Friend)
- 1923 The Stage Favourites' Cook Book
- 1932 New Standard Cookery Illustrated
- 1932 Cooking with Elizabeth Craig
- 1932 The Up-to-Date Cookery Book
- 1933 Madeira: wine, cakes and sauce (In collaboration with André L. Simon)
- 1933 Entertaining with Elizabeth Craig (Illustrated by Herry Perry)
- 1934 Cakes and Candies: How to make them (Calendar with recipes)
- 1934 The Vicomte in the Kitchen (Georges, Vicomte de Mauduit's Cookery Book; introductions by Elizabeth Craig and Frances, Countess of Warwick)
- 1934 Elizabeth Craig's Standard Recipes
- 1934 Wine in the Kitchen
- 1934 Elizabeth Craig's Economical Cookery
- 1934 Elizabeth Craig's Simple Cooking
- 1935 Elizabeth Craig's Family Cookery: a new standard economical cookery on comprehensive lines
- 1935 Elizabeth Craig's Everyday Cooking
- 1936 Cookery Illustrated and Household Management
- 1936 Woman, Wine and a Saucepan
- 1936 Bubble and Squeak
- 1937 278 Tested Recipes
- 1940 Cooking in War-Time
- 1940 Cookery: a Time-Saving Cook Book
- 1940 1500 Everyday Menus
- 1950 Cooking for Today
- 1952 Elizabeth Craig's Practical Cooking
- 1953 Court Favourites; Recipes from Royal Kitchens
- 1955 Beer and Vittels [sic]
- 1956 The Scottish Cookery Book (see also 1980)
- 1956 A Book of Mediterranean Food
- 1957 Instructions to Young Cooks
- 1957 Collins Family Cookery (see also 1971)
- 1958 Scandinavian Cooking
- 1959 A Cook's Guide to Wine
- 1960 Cottage Cheese and Yogurt
- 1962 Banana Dishes
- 1965 What's Cooking in Scotland
- 1965 The Penguin Salad Book
- 1965 Cook Continentale
- 1969 The Art of Irish Cooking
- 1970 The Business Woman's Cookbook
- 1971 Collins Family Cookery (see also 1957)
- 1978 Elizabeth Craig's Hotch Potch
- 1980 The Scottish Cookery Book (see also 1956)

=== Promotional recipe books ===
Unknown dates

- 19?? More Everyday Dishes (Tate & Lyle Sugars & Syrups)
- 19?? Primula Presents Recipes by Elizabeth Craig
- 19?? The Kikkoman Book of Recipes
- 19?? 101 Recipes and Uses for Malt Vinegar (Malt Vinegar Brewers Association)

Known dates

- 1930 250 Recipes for use with Borwick's Baking Powder
- 1932 New Ways of using Custard (Foster Clark Ltd)
- 1934 The Importance of Eating Potatoes (Potato Marketing Board)
- 1937 The Way to a Good Table: electric cookery (British Electrical Development Association)
- 1938 (circa) Cooking Made Easier (Foster Clark Ltd – c. 1938)
- 1940 OxO Meat Cookery! The Oxo Way
- 1940 Slim While You Eat, a calendar with over 100 recipes
- 1949 (circa) Elizabeth Craig's Invalid Recipe Book (Benger's Food Limited – c. 1949)
- 1949 Chicken in the Kitchen
- 1954 Waterless Cooking (Milbro Vapour Seal Waterless Cookers)

=== Books on housekeeping and gardening ===
- 1936 Elizabeth Craig's Simple Housekeeping
- 1936 The Housewives' Monthly Calendar
- 1936 Keeping House with Elizabeth Craig
- 1937 Modern Housekeeping
- 1937 Elizabeth Craig's Household Library (1937 onwards)
- 1938 Elizabeth's Craig's Simple Gardening
- 1940 Gardening with Elizabeth Craig (Gardening in wartime)
- 1941 Elizabeth Craig's Needlecraft
- 1947 Housekeeping: a book for the single-handed housewife
- 1947 1000 Household Hints
- 1948 Gardening with Elizabeth Craig; new edition
- 1950 Elizabeth Craig's Enquire Within
- 1952 Elizabeth Craig's Practical Gardening
