= Bill Pearson (New Zealand writer) =

New Zealand writer

William Harrison Pearson (18 January 1922 – 27 September 2002) was a New Zealand fiction writer, essayist and critic, known for his novel Coal Flat, published in 1963.

== Early life ==
Bill Pearson was born in Greymouth and began writing at an early age, writing for the children's page of the Christchurch Star-Sun. He completed a BA in English at the Canterbury University College in 1939 and trained as a teacher at Dunedin Training College. He taught briefly at Blackball Primary School in 1942. He served in World War II between 1942 and 1946, firstly in the dental corps in Fiji, then in the infantry in Egypt, Italy and Japan.

== Career ==
Pearson completed his MA at Canterbury University and edited the student newspaper Canta in 1948. He taught briefly at Oxford District High School before travelling to London in 1949 to begin a PhD at the University of London, which he completed in 1952. He returned to New Zealand in 1954 to teach in the English Department at the Auckland University College until his retirement in 1986. He spent time as a research fellow in the Research School of Pacific Studies at the Australian National University in Canberra from 1967 to 1969.

He drew on his experiences of teaching at Blackball to write the novel Coal Flat, which was published in 1963. It was begun after he finished his PhD and completed before he left England. During the two years of writing it he supported himself by doing supply teaching (replacing teachers who are absent). After the publication of Coal Flat, Pearson wrote no more fiction, and concentrated on essays, editing and literary criticism.

His collected essays and reviews on New Zealand literature and society were published in Fretful Sleepers and Other Essays in 1974. The essay Fretful Sleepers, first published in Landfall in 1952, was written while he was in England and contemplating returning to New Zealand. It was based on his thoughts of New Zealand and his time in the forces and was an analysis and description of New Zealand as well as a plea for more variety, tolerance and sensitivity.

Contradictions in Pearson's perspectives about gender and class have been identified by JC Somers, who argues that while the author believed himself to be on the progressive left, the texts of Coal Flat and Fretful Sleepers reveal tacit, unresolved, conservative and elitist views about contemporary popular culture and conformist consumerism.

A well-reviewed biography by Paul Millar entitled No Fretful Sleeper: A Life of Bill Pearson was published in 2010. The cover of the book is an oil painting of Pearson by Heather "Herry" Perry in 1952.

== Personal life ==
Pearson had a close relationship with the Māori university community during his tenure at the University of Auckland. He was involved in the creation of the Māori Studies department at the university.

Pearson was a closeted gay man for much of his life; he was trapped between a sexual identity that through much of his lifetime was the object of extreme prejudice and some criminal sanction, and his desire to fit in with his peers. His fear of being outed drove him underground. Homosexual relations between men were only decriminalised in New Zealand in 1986.

He was also a social activist and pacifist during the 1950s and 1960s. He was a member of the New Zealand Peace Council and edited their magazine Peace. He belonged to CND, the Council for Racial Equality (CARE) and the Auckland Council of Civil Liberties, and edited Here and Now magazine.

== Works ==
- Attitudes to the Maori in some Pakeha fiction (1958)
- Coal Flat (1963), full text at the NZETC
- Collected stories, 1935–1963 / by Frank Sargeson; with an introduction by Bill Pearson (1964)
- Henry Lawson among Maoris (1968)
- Brown man's burden, and later stories / by Roderick Finlayson; edited and introduced by Bill Pearson (1973)
- Fretful Sleepers and Other Essays (1974), full text at the NZETC
- Rifled sanctuaries : some views of the Pacific Islands in western literature to 1900 (1984)
- Six stories (1991)
