= Muriel Jackson =

English wood engraver

Muriel Blomfield Jackson
- Born: 9 March 1901; London, England
- Died: 1977 (aged 75–76)
- Education: Hampstead Day School, Central School of Arts and Crafts
- Known for: Wood engraving
- Notable work: Wagon on the Heath (1931)
- Spouse: Francis Courtenay Mason
- Children: 2
- Parents: Arthur Blomfield Jackson (father); Ida Mary Phipps (mother)
- Relatives: Charles J. Phipps (grandfather)
- Awards: Logan Medal of the Arts; 1931 Wagon on the Heath
- Elected: Associate of the Society of Wood Engravers

Muriel Blomfield Jackson (9 March 1901 – 1977) was an English wood engraver who was active at the beginning of the twentieth century. She was a pupil of Noel Rooke at the Central School of Arts and Crafts and exhibited regularly with the Society of Wood Engravers.

== Biography ==
Muriel Jackson was born in London, the daughter of architect Arthur Blomfield Jackson, and was educated at Hampstead Day School. She studied at the Central School of Arts and Crafts in London from 1917 to 1922 under Noel Rooke for wood engraving and F. Ernest Jackson for tempera painting. From 1920 she specialised in recording gypsy caravans on Hampstead Heath, and in 1922 she designed a poster Happy days at the zoo for London County Council Tramways. She was a finalist in the British Prix de Rome scholarship competition in 1925 and in 1931 received the Logan Medal of the Arts at the International Exhibition of Lithography and Wood Engraving in Chicago, for her print Wagon on the Heath.

In 1928 she married Francis Courtenay Mason (1891–1953), a surgeon of Harley Street. They had two children, a son and a daughter.

== Wood engravings ==
Jackson exhibited with the Society of Wood Engravers from 1923 to 1940, when the society ceased arranging exhibitions until it was revived by Margaret Pilkington in 1949. She was elected an associate of the society in 1925. She was never commissioned to illustrate any books, but her work was reproduced sporadically in Drawing and Design and the Studio. Her wood engraving Motor bike was reproduced in the August 1924 number of Drawing and Design, and The Fencers in the March 1930 number of the Studio, which also reproduced Balaam's Ass in the June 1951 number. Malcolm C. Salaman reproduces Harvesters, Italy in his 1930 review published by the Studio and grants her the terse comment: '"There is a splendid pictorial rhythm in Miss Muriel Jackson's "Harvesters, Italy"." Jackson also exhibited works with the New English Art Club and, between 1927 and 1966, at the Royal Academy in London. During her career, Jackson completed a number of public commissions for murals, notably for St Peter's Church at Limehouse in east London. She was a member of the Red Rose Guild.

Her work is represented in the collection of the Art Institute of Chicago.
