= Dorothy Purdew =

British businesswoman (1932–2023)

Dorothy Rose Sanders Purdew (4 March 1932 – 5 September 2023) was a British businesswoman who was recognized for her role in the development and management of the Champneys spa chain.

== Early life and family ==
Purdew was born on 4 March 1932, in Clapham, South London to working class parents. Her mother, May, descended from a Liverpool docker lineage, and her father, Dickie, an orphan, was raised in a workhouse before becoming a labourer and plumber. The family moved to Harrow when she was five years old and lived in rented rooms in South Harrow. During World War II, Dorothy was evacuated to a farm in Wiltshire, while her father served in North Africa and her mother worked in an ammunition factory. Her formal education concluded at 14 due to financial constraints.

== Career ==
After leaving school at 14, Purdew worked in a dress-making factory. Following a personal weight loss experience with Weight Watchers in her late 30s, Sanders founded her own slimming club, WeightGuard. Later in life, she attempted to establish a health spa at Thornby Hall in 1978, but faced financial challenges that led to voluntary liquidation.

In 1981, Purdew acquired Henlow Grange, a pre-existing health farm in Bedfordshire, which she developed into a spa. Under her leadership, and in collaboration with her son Stephen, several more spa locations were opened, including Springs in Leicestershire and Forest Mere in Hampshire.

In 2002, the Purdews acquired Champneys spa at Tring in Hertfordshire, leading to the rebranding of their establishments under the Champneys name.

Sanders was awarded an OBE in 2008 for her contributions to the wellness industry. She authored an autobiography, The Long Road to Champneys, in 2010.

== Controversy ==
The business strategy of offering celebrities reduced rates for stays became controversial in 2011 when Sir Paul Stephenson resigned as the Metropolitan Police commissioner following a complimentary stay at Champneys Tring.

== Bibliography ==
- The Long Road to Champneys (2010)
