= Celia Fiennes (artist) =

English artist (1902–1998)

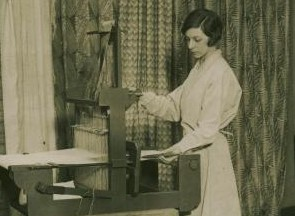
- Fiennes in 1928
- Born: Celia Mary Twisleton-Wykeham-Fiennes; 10 March 1902; Ealing, Middlesex
- Died: 17 September 1998 (aged 96); Culworth, England
- Education: Central School of Arts and Crafts
- Known for: Printmaking, Painting
- Spouse(s): Noel Rooke, m.1932-1953, his death

Celia Mary Twisleton-Wykeham-Fiennes known as Celia Fiennes and later Celia Rooke, (Note: This British person has the barrelled surname Twisleton-Wykeham-Fiennes, but is known by the surname Fiennes and later Rooke.) (10 March 1902 – 17 September 1998) was a British artist, notable as a printmaker and book illustrator.

== Biography ==
Fiennes was born in Ealing in London and was the daughter of Alberic Fiennes, (1865–1919), who worked at the Bank of England and his wife Gertrude, the daughter of a Royal Navy officer. Celia Fiennes was a direct descendant of the 17th-century travel writer Celia Fiennes.

Fiennes studied at the Central School of Arts and Crafts and when she graduated began working for the Arts and Crafts Exhibition Society in London. There she was largely responsible for organizing the Society's 1928 and 1931 exhibitions. During this time she continued to work as an artist. She produced a series of woodcut silhouette designs for the 1926 Golden Cockerel Press edition of The Fables of Aesop. Also in 1926, she produced twelve wood engravings for the Cresset Press edition of Matthew Stevenson's 1661 work The Twelve Moneths. In December 1932 Fiennes married Noel Rooke who had been one of her teachers at the Central School and was considered a leading light in the revival of the technique of wood engraving in Britain. In later life Fiennes turned from printmaking to concentrate on painting and in due course retired to a village near Banbury called Culworth where she died in 1998.

== Works illustrated ==
- The Fables of Aesop, Golden Cockerel Press, 1926
- The Twelve Moneths [sic] by Matthew Stevenson, Cresset Press, 1926
- Together with a Diary for 1929, Cresset Press, 1929
- The Grave of Arthur by G. K. Chesterton, Ariel poem No. 25, Faber and Faber, 1930.
