= Stanley Webb Davies =

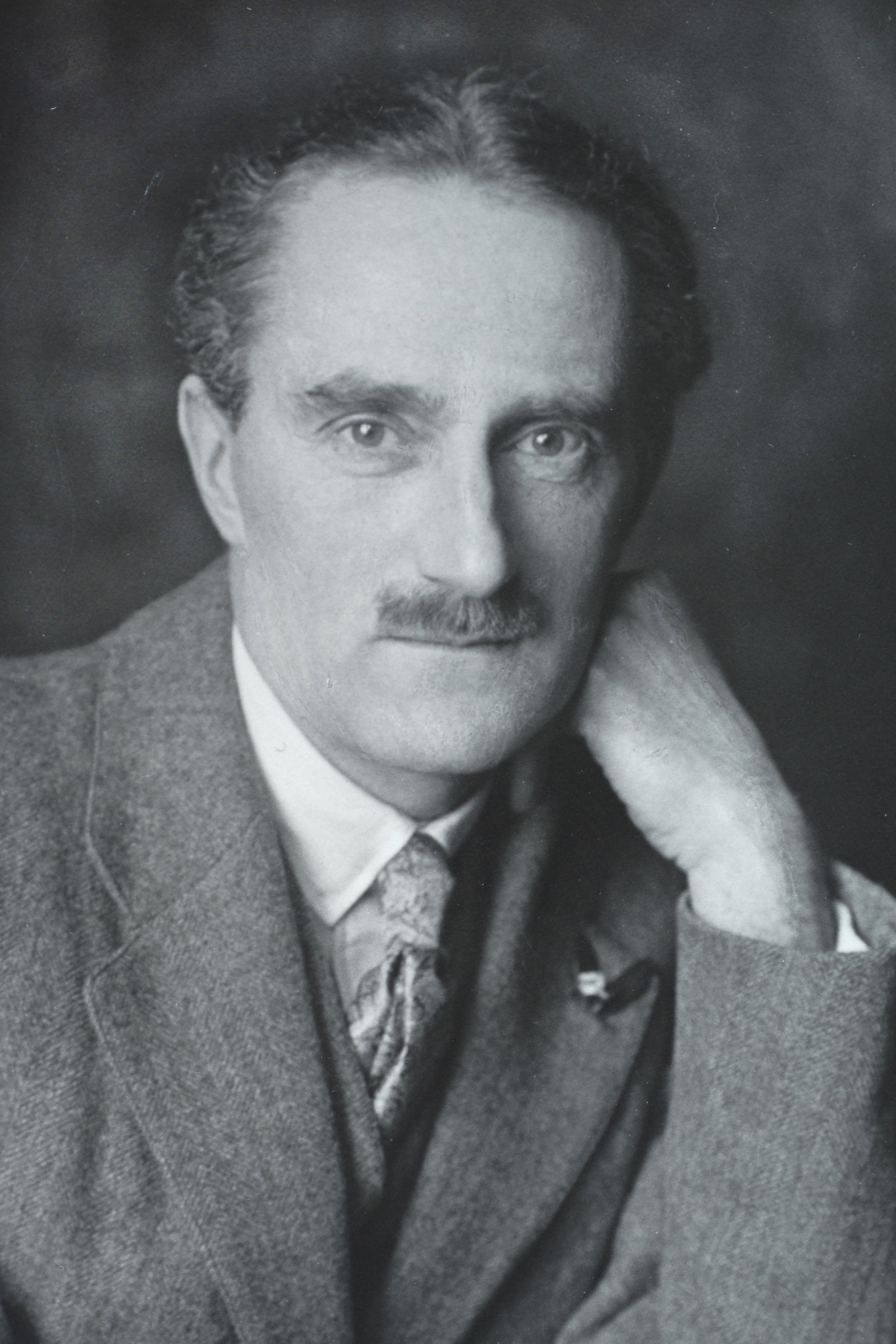
Stanley Webb Davies, pictured in 1935.

Stanley Webb Davies (1894–1978) was one of Great Britain's premier makers of Arts and Crafts furniture from his workshop in Windermere in the Lake District.

== Biography ==
Stanley was born in Darwen, Lancashire, into a wealthy mill-owning family of Quakers. A 2016 biography, Stanley Webb Davies; Family, Friends and Furniture tells of his education at Quaker Schools Sidcot and Bootham before going on to Oxford.

He was there in the spring of 1916 when he got his call-up papers. He applied for absolute exemption but was turned down. Instead he joined the Friends (Quakers) war victims relief team and worked in France making wooden houses for the poor peasants. He was there for three years and his health never recovered.

After the war he turned his back on the family's textile interests and spent two years learning his craft with Arthur Romney Green in Christchurch on the South Coast.

He left there in 1922 and began to set up his business in Windermere where he built a workshop and had a new house, Gatesbield, built off New Road. He and his wife Emily lived there for over 40 years. Like all of the artisans in the Arts and Crafts movement, such as William Morris and John Ruskin, his work was a direct backlash to the mechanisation and automation of Victorian times. His approach was for simple but elegant furniture, handmade to a high standard.

In a 1940s letter to the Manchester Guardian, during a lively debate on a national policy for industry, he wrote of "probably the chief evil of our present industrial age – the tyranny of the machine." He was a member of the Red Rose Guild.

"Hundreds of thousands of citizens live their working lives in bondage. They are machine minders and no call is ever made on them to use their skill, their initiative or their intelligence." It was, he felt, "more important that industry should turn out excellent men and women than a flood of cheap and useful goods." He looked forward to "a new and better order of society which looks towards a better welfare of the people rather than towards national riches in the material sense."

Stanley Davies died in 1978, five years after the death of Emily, and he bequeathed Gatesbield to the Quakers for whom he had worked.

In 1931 Stanley's older brother Percy, a prominent Quaker and Socialist, invited Mohandas K. Gandhi to Darwen to witness at first hand the plight of Lancashire textile workers who had been badly hit by the Indian boycott of British goods. Police had expected trouble but the Indian spiritual leader received a warm, Northern welcome.

A group of weavers met him the following morning as he went for a stroll around Garden Village which the Davies family had built for their workers. They told him how hard they were finding things. The Mahatma smiled and told them gently: "My dears, you have no idea what poverty is."

The work of Stanley Davies and his small team of assistants are in museums and houses, churches and auction centres, galleries and municipal buildings throughout the country.

In 2019 a large collection of Stanley Webb Davies furniture was sold at auction by Dawsons Auctioneers. Consigned directly by the Webb Davies family, the highlight of the sale was an Oak Secretaire that sold for £4,500.

Percy Davies became the first Lord Darwen in 1946.
