= Red Rose Guild =

Organisation of British crafts people

- Formation: 1921; 105 years ago
- Defunct: 1985
- Type: Craft organisation
- Purpose: To promote the importance of craftwork in modern society
- Headquarters: The Whitworth, Manchester
- Region served: UK
- Leader: Margaret Pilkington OBE
- Affiliations: Crafts Centre of Great Britain

The Red Rose Guild was a guild based in Manchester, with the aim to promote British arts and crafts. It was “regarded as the most influential national outlet for makers” in Britain during the first half of the twentieth century. The Guild was founded in 1921 by printmaker Margaret Pilkington, OBE, and remained active until 1985. The Guild held annual exhibitions at Houldsworth Hall, part of what is now Hulme Hall, Manchester until World War II. Prominent members of the Guild included potter Bernard Leach, silversmith Joyce Himsworth and weaver Ethel Mairet. After the war, the Guild moved its headquarters to Whitworth Hall. In 1950 the Guild joined the Crafts Centre of Great Britain.

== History ==
In 1920 an exhibition by northern craftsmen living in London was held at Houldsworth Hall. Called The Red Rose Guild of Arts and Crafts, its success led to the formation of the Red Rose Guild of Artworkers in January 1921. The Guild was inspired by the work of William Morris. Its symbol, a red rose, reflected the Guild's origins in the north west of England.

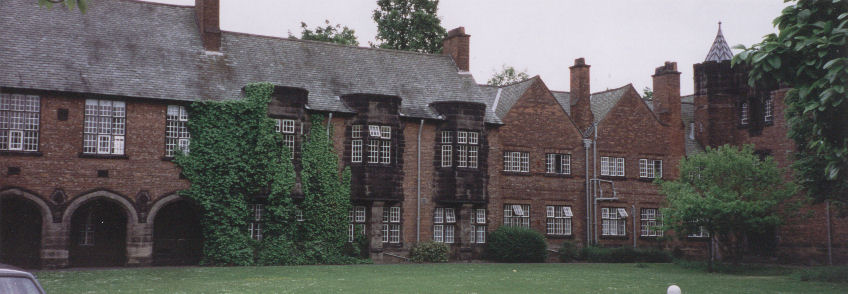
Houldsworth Hall, Hulme Hall

The Guild was “a central authoritative body, maintaining exacting standards for membership and providing both a vital sales outlet and a regular annual meeting place.” They made a point of excluding any exhibits which appeared either ‘commercial’ or machine-made.

The Guild played a leading role in the debate about the future of craftspeople after WWII. They campaigned for state protection and the guild's secretary, Harry Norris, successfully argued for the exemption of “key craftworkers from war service in order to ensure the survival of craft skills.” This debate resulted in craftworkers being exempt from “punitive” post-war purchase tax. Alongside this they developed a craftsman's licence scheme.

In 1950 the Guild joined the Crafts Centre of Great Britain, alongside the Arts and Crafts Exhibition Society, the Society of Scribes & Illuminators, the Senefelder Club and the Society of Wood Engravers.

== Name ==
The Guild's name evolved over time. Founded as the Red Rose Guild of Arts and Crafts in 1920, it changed its name to the Red Rose Guild of Artworkers in 1921. In 1940s the name was changed to the Red Rose Guild of Craftsmen and finally in the 1960s to the Red Rose Guild of Designer Craftsmen.

== Exhibitions and venues ==
An advertisement in the Manchester Evening News for the Guild's first exhibition in October 1921 listed exhibits including “Embroideries, Lace, Weaving, Jewellery, Leather and Basket Work, Sculpture, Pottery, Stained Glass &c”. Exhibitions were held at Manchester's Houldsworth Hall every autumn until the outbreak of war in 1939.

In 1925 the exhibition had 32 stalls; by the 1950s the number was over 80. The 1926 Arts and Crafts yearbook read “a general colour scheme was introduced of cream outlined with black and gold which proved an excellent background for the exhibits.”

May 1939 saw a month-long exhibition at Whitworth Art Gallery, Manchester, including, for the first time, calligraphy, and bookbinding. In the same year the Guild opened a shop on St Ann Street, Manchester. In 1940 the Guild moved its headquarters to The Whitworth Hall.

The Guild held joint exhibitions with the Arts and Crafts Exhibition Society at the Manchester City Art Gallery in 1940, and in London in 1941 and 1944. The 1941 catalogue had an introduction by Nikolaus Pevsner, who “predicted a bright future for the crafts after the war.”

The first exhibition in Manchester after WWII was held in November 1946.

From 1963 to 1974 the Guild had a permanent exhibition space featuring members’ products at the Crane Gallery (Northern Crafts Centre), South King Street, Manchester. In 1971 the Guild held an exhibition at the Whitworth Art Gallery to mark its 50th anniversary. The 1984 exhibition was held in June at the Royal Northern College of Music.

=== Crafts the journal ===
The journal Crafts was edited by Harry Norris from 1940 to 1946. He used it “to advance a series of anti-industrial polemics”. The magazine featured the “last thoughts of Eric Gill” together with essays by H. J. Massingham, Percy Beales, Anthony Gardner and Michael Cardew. It was published until at least 1948.

=== Organisers ===
Early organisers of the Guild included founder, Margaret Pilkington OBE (1891–1974), who remained on the board for forty years. She was the first honorary secretary and occasionally took the chair from 1926 onwards. In the early years of the Guild, Pilkington was supported by Kathleen Smartt, Dorothy Hutton, and Margaret Fullerton Davies. Harry Norris, Pilkington's “protégé” was secretary and Mr Cadness was chair.

Later committee members included Charles F Sixsmith (chairman) in 1937, Reginald Marlow (chairman) in 1967, Marie Nordlinger (committee member) and Alex McErlain (treasurer) in 1980s.

== Members ==
The Red Rose Guild included the following members:

Name	Dates	Specialism
Pat Atkinson		Potter
Phyllis Barron	1890–1964	Textiles
Howard Bissell		Potter
Mary Booth		Jeweller
Mary Bryan	1918 - ?	Textiles
Francis Cargeeg	1893–1981	Coppersmith
Mr A Carne		Ironworker
Molly Challoner		Silversmith
Kathleen Clarke		Embroiderer
Derek Clarkson		Potter
Margaret Clarkson		Silversmith
Catherine ‘Casty’ Cockerell (later Cobb)	1903–1995	Jeweller
Sydney Cockerell	1897–1962	Bookbinder
Peter Collingwood, OBE	1922–1997	Weaver
Joanna Constantinidis	1927–2000	Potter
George Frederick Cook	1927–2000	Potter
Emmanuel Cooper	1938–2012	Potter
Francis Glanville Cooper	1918–1983	Potter
Ronald Glanville Cooper	1910-?	Potter
Gertrude Crawford	1868–1937	Turner
Helen Crosby		Weaver
Bernard Cuzner		Jeweller
William Bower Dalton	1868–1965	Potter
Stanley Webb Davies	1894–1978	Furniture maker
Brian Dewbury		Potter
Alan Durst	1883–1970	Wood carver
Derek Emms	1929–2004	Potter
William Fishley Holland	1889–1969	Potter
Mary Farmer	1940-2021	Textiles
Kathleen Fleetwood		Jeweller
Robert Charles Privett Fournier	1915–2008	Potter
Joyce Mary Griffiths	1912-?	Weaver
Joyce Hainsworth		Silversmith
Mrs K Hampson		Weaver
Deborah Harding		Potter
Anthony Paton Hawksley	1921–1991	Jeweller and silversmith
Gerd Hay-Edie	1909-1997	Weaver
Joyce Gwendolyn Haynes		Potter
Henry Hammond		Potter
John Henshall	1913–1996	Calligrapher
Miss K Heron		Weaver
Joyce Himsworth	1905–1989	Silversmith
Ruth Hurle		Weaver
Dorothy Hutton	1889–1984	Calligrapher
Margery Kendon	1902–1985	Weaver
Muriel Jackson	1901–1977	Wood engraver
Muriel Lanchester	1901–1992	Potter
Rita Lankuttis		Embroiderer
Dorothy Larcher	1884–1952	Textiles
Bernard Leach	1887–1979	Potter
Ethel Mairet	1872–1952	Weaver
John Makepeace	b.1939	Furniture designer
Reginald Marlow		Potter
Enid Marx	1902–1998	Designer
William Ongley Miller	1883–1960	Painter
Alice Moore	1909–1980	Embroiderer
Theo Moorman	1907–1990	Weaver
Roy Mulligan		Furniture maker
Gwen Mullins, OBE	1904–1997	Weaver
William Staite Murray	1881–1962	Potter
Henry George Murphy	1884–1939	Silversmith
Robin Nance	1907–1990	Furniture maker
Kenneth Neville		Enameller
Sue Newhouse		Embroiderer
Edith Norris	1877-1989	Stained glass and mosaics
Harry Norris	1901-1968	Woodworker
David Peace		Glass engraver
Marcia Pidgeon	1955-?	Gold and silversmith
Katherine Pleydell-Bouverie	1895-1985	Potter
Fiona Porteous		Textile
Roger Powell	1896-1990	Bookbinder
Dunstan Pruden		Silversmith
Elizabeth Reddish		Silversmith
Archie Milne Robertson		Potter
Seonaid Mairi Robertson	1921–2008	Potter
Gordon Russell	1892–1980	Furniture maker
Dunstan Alfred Charles Pruden	1907–1974	Goldsmith and sculptor
Barbara Sawyer	1919–1982	Weaver
Arthur Simpson	1857–1922	Wood carver
Hubert Simpson	1889-?	Wood carver
Marianne Straub	1909–1994	Weaver
Ann Sutton	b.1935	Weaver
Julia M Sweet	(? – 1942)	Lacemaker
Thomas W Swindlehurst	c.1900-1965	Calligrapher
James Spencer Taylor	1921–2010	Graphic designer
Joyce Barbara Taylor	1921–2006	Embroiderer
Margaret Stanley Thompson	1918–2007	Wood engraver
Pauline Vivienne		Potter
Roy Waddington	1917–1981	Calligrapher
James Walford	1913–2001	Potter
Hugh Wallis		Silversmith
Florence Welch		Weaver
Geoffrey Whiting	1919–1988	Potter
Rosemary Wren	1922–2013	Potter

Other exhibitors included The Weaving School for Crippled Girls (1936), the Manchester School of Art, Salford School of Art and Bolton School of Art.
