= Henry George Murphy =

British artist (1884-1939)

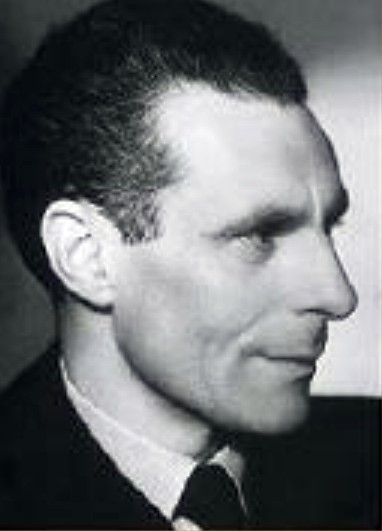
- H. G. Murphy
- Born: 1884; Birchington, Kent
- Died: 1939 (aged 54–55)
- Occupation: Art-deco silversmith

Henry George Murphy, aka H. G. Murphy (1884 in Birchington, Kent – 1939) was an English art-deco silversmith.

== Career ==
Murphy was apprenticed to Henry Wilson in 1899. At age 14 he entered the Central School of Arts and Crafts in London.

In July 1912 he was employed by Emil Lettre in Berlin. He found the work unfulfilling and left after six weeks. The same year he opened his own workshop in London. During World War I he enlisted in the Royal Navy Air Service. In 1928 he started the Falcon Studio, comprising a workshop and retail outlet in Weymouth Street, London.

He returned to the Central School and remained there, teaching goldsmithing and enamelling, and became the first head of silversmithing, and later principal of the school in 1936. He was a member of the Red Rose Guild.

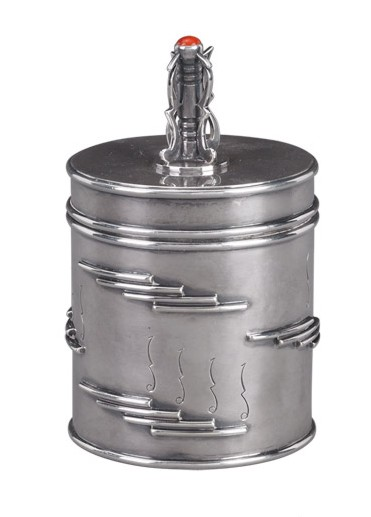
Silver box

== Arms ==
Coat of arms of Henry George Murphy

Motto
Fortis Et Hospitalis
