= Kevin Coates =

British Artist Goldsmith

Kevin Coates (born 1950) is a British goldsmith and musician. He is chiefly known for his work with jewels, but has also made table-pieces, ceremonial objects, small sculptures, and a number of medals.

== Early and personal life ==
Coates was born in Kingston, Surrey, but grew up in West Sussex. In 1966 his family travelled to Australia for two years where he studied with violin teacher Antonio de Palma. On return to the U.K. he took a Foundation course followed by a degree course at Central School of Art and an M.A in Jewellery Design at the Royal College of Art. His Ph.D. from the Royal College of Art was published as Geometry, Proportion and the Art of Lutherie in 1985.

Coates is also a musician (violin, viola, viola d'amore, baroque mandolin and lute), specialising in baroque and early classical music, using original instruments of their period. In 1974, he met the musician (harpsichord, fortepiano and percussion) and film maker Nel Romano, with whom he formed the Duo Vinaccia to promote the music of the baroque mandolin; they married in 1976 and there followed numerous recitals, recordings and broadcasts.

== Career ==
Coates' pieces have been described as "characterized by a spiritual symbolism that is integral to the design", and he is noted for the range of colours in his work. His designs include the 1982 Amity Cup and a 1990 silver medal of Mozart. He was awarded the first Marlow Award by the Society of Designer Craftsmen in 1972 followed by their Medal of Excellence in 1973. In 1976 he was awarded the Anstruther Award for goldsmithing by the Royal College of Art. In 1977 he was awarded the first Norman-Butler Award from the Worshipful Company of Goldsmiths. He is an honorary Fellow of the Royal College of Art and a Liveryman of the Goldsmiths' Company.

== Publications ==
- Geometry, Proportion, and the Art of Lutherie. Kevin Coates. Oxford University Press (1985): ISBN 9780 198161 3 94.
  - Clarendon Paperbacks (1991): ISBN 9780 198 162 46 9.
- Kevin Coates: Goldsmith. Kevin Coates. The Goldsmiths' Company (1991): ISBN 9780 907814 2 14.
- Fragments: Pages Stolen from a Book of Time. Kevin Coates. Arsenale Editrice, Venice (1999): ISBN 9788 877432 60 5.
- Kevin Coates: A Hidden Alchemy - goldsmithing, jewels and table-pieces. K Coates with E Goring, H Clifford, N Romano, F Carli and Sir Roy Strong. Arnoldsche Art Publishers, Stuttgart (2008): ISBN 978 3 89790 284 8.
- A Bestiary of Jewels. Kevin Coates. Ruthin Craft Centre in association with the Ashmolean Museum (2014):ISBN 9781 905865 63 5.

== Collections ==
Coates's work is held in the public collections of the Victoria and Albert Museum, the National Museums of Scotland, the British Museum, the Museum of Fine Arts, Boston, The Silver Trust and the Goldsmiths' Company, London.

== Exhibitions ==
- 1999-2001 Fragments: Pages Stolen from a Book of Time, Royal Museum, National Museums of Scotland, Edinburgh and Kennedy Galleries, New York
- 2001 Supermodels, The Goldsmiths' Hall, London; Slices of Silver, Partridge's, London
- 2006 Kevin Coates - The 'Mozart' Jewels, Mobilia Gallery, Cambridge, Massachusetts.
- 2007 A Notebook of Pins, Mobilia Gallery, Cambridge, Massachusetts and Wallace Collection and 2010, at Collect, Saatchi Gallery, London.
- 2011 Time Regained, Works by Artist-Goldsmith Kevin Coates, Wallace Collection
- 2014 A Bestiary of Jewels, Ashmolean Museum, Oxford
