= Helen Stevenson (artist) =

Scottish artist

Helen Grace Stevenson was a Scottish artist, most active in the 1920s and 1930s when her colour woodcuts of Scottish scenes proved popular.

== Biography ==
During the early 1920s, Stevenson studied at the Edinburgh College of Art under Frank Morley Fletcher who taught her to produce woodcut prints using Japanese techniques. Between 1924 and 1935, she exhibited many prints of Scottish life and landscapes with the Society of Graver Printers in Colour (SGPC). Works shown by Stevenson at the SGPC included The Hen Wife in 1926, Washing Day in 1930 and Gylen Castle, Kerrera, exhibited in 1934. Stevenson was also a regular exhibitor with the Royal Scottish Academy where she showed some fourteen works, with the Aberdeen Artists Society and at the Royal Glasgow Institute of the Fine Arts which exhibited fifteen of her works. The British Museum holds two examples of her prints.
