= Seebohm Report =

1960s investigation into UK social services

The Seebohm Report (1968) or the Seebohm Report on Local Authority and Allied Personal Social Services was the report of a committee reviewing the organisation and work of social services in the United Kingdom.

It recommended that separate local authority health departments such as children's' mental health, social welfare, and home help, should be condensed into a single department of social service.

== Context ==
Twenty years after the creation of the National Health Service, local authority services were seen as chaotic and not working well. Scandals about the treatment of people with mental health issues, learning disabilities and the elderly had led to distrust of services.

== Committee ==
On 20 December 1965, Douglas Houghton MP created the Committee on Local Authority Personal Social Services, chaired by Frederic (Lord) Seebohm.

== Report ==
The Seebohm Committee report recommended that social care services should be more connected with each other and other health and welfare services. They emphasised care in the community and preventative care as being more financially efficient.

In March 1968, the Seebohm report proposed that services for children, the elderly and for mental welfare should be brought together into a single family services department. They used the phrase "one door on which to knock". This approach sought to provide services to prevent ill health and difficulties rather than solve particular needs and problems and challenged the hospital-centred model.

== Impact ==
In a House of Lords session of 1969, Baroness Brooke of Ystradfellte spoke of waiting lists for residential care and spoke in support of the Seebohm Report recommendations.

In 1970, the Local Authority Social Services Act received royal assent, leading to the creation of social services departments in councils as suggested by the Seebohm report. Richard Crossman, the Labour Member of Parliament who saw this act through, was sceptical about the practicality of the report's recommendations.

Whilst accepting the need for a single authority, the Royal Medico-Psychological Association declared themselvesd against the proposed reorganisation of mental welfare and child guidance services. Nicholas Timmins suggested that the creation of "generic social workers" based on Seebohm recommendations led to the decline of the Medical Officer of Health.
