= Joyce Himsworth =

British silversmith (1905-1989)

- Born: 19 August 1905; Sheffield, England
- Died: 31 March 1989 (aged 83); Sheffield, England
- Occupation: Designer silversmith

Joyce Rosemary Himsworth (19 August 1905 – 31 March 1989) was a British independent designer silversmith. From an early age she worked with her father, the polymath Joseph Beeston Himsworth (1874–1968) making small spoons and items of jewellery. She went on to study at Sheffield College of Arts and Craft, focusing on jewellery manufacture and enamelling. Her undoubted talents were not enough for her to gain a position within the family cutlery firm, B. Worth & Sons.

== Silversmithing ==
Joyce Himsworth and her father registered a joint mark at Sheffield Assay Office in 1925, which comprised both sets of their initials. However, just a year later, having established her own workshop at 31 Chelsea Road, Brincliffe, Sheffield she began to use this mark on work she produced as an independent designer silversmith. She studied at the Central School of Arts and Crafts, London (under H. G. Murphy). In 1934 she received a first class City and Guilds certificate in Goldsmithing and Silversmithing and awarded the highest mark nationally for her enamel work. In 1935 she registered her mark 'JRH' at the London and Sheffield Assay Offices.

From 1925 she was an exhibiting member of the Sheffield Art Crafts Guild (founded in 1894 by Charles Green). A 1932 report of the Guild describes its aims as, "the encouragement of skilled artistic handicrafts, promoting fellowship between artist craftworkers, disseminating information by means of demonstrations, exhibitions and lectures". The Guild was not limited to metalworkers, but embraced a wide range of artistic endeavours such as leatherwork, textile design, architectural design, ceramics and sculpture. Her silverware was included in the 50th anniversary exhibition of the Arts and Crafts Society at the Royal Academy of Arts, London in 1938. and at the Walker Art Gallery, Liverpool. She was also a member of the Red Rose Guild.

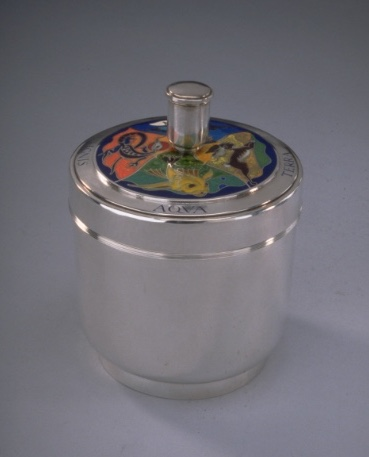
Joyce Himsworth, 'Cigarette Canister, 1934', Silver and enamel. Collection of the Worshipful Company of Goldsmiths, London.

Himsworth was not a prolific maker, working mainly to commission. Himsworth's work was exhibited with the Sheffield Art Crafts Guild, with whom she was elected Honorary Secretary (1926–1936) and later exhibited with the Red Rose Guild of Craftsmen. She also taught at the art colleges in Rotherham and Chesterfield. Throughout her life she took part in many of the Goldsmiths’ Company exhibitions both at home and abroad.

== Artistic influences ==
Inspired by the art and crafts movement, Himsworth followed in the footsteps of earlier Sheffield trained silversmiths and jewellery designers, Omar Ramsden and John Walker. Her early stylistic influences were varied and far reaching and included Egyptian and Celtic design.

== Artistic collaborations ==
Himsworth began a working relationship with Leonard Beaumont in early 1935, taking inspiration from his art deco influenced coloured linocuts. Beaumont produced simple line drawings which Himsworth then translated onto her unique pieces of silverware. These silver items with their modernist designs included, Cigarette Box (1935) and Cigarette Case (1936), both are in Museums Sheffield Collection. Himsworth and Beaumont were exhibiting members of the Sheffield Art Crafts Guild. In July 1936, as departing Honorary Secretary of the Guild, Himsworth received from Beaumont, as the Guild Master a bound collection of his colour linocuts. Their joint efforts were exhibited at Brook Street Galleries, London (June 1937).

== Political influences ==
Himsworth was interested in politics, particularly Russian communism. She was a member of the British-Soviet Friendship Society and the British Peace Committee (other members included the actress Dame Sybil Thorndike and the eminent archaeologist Vere Gordon Childe). Her political influences are sometimes visible in her work.

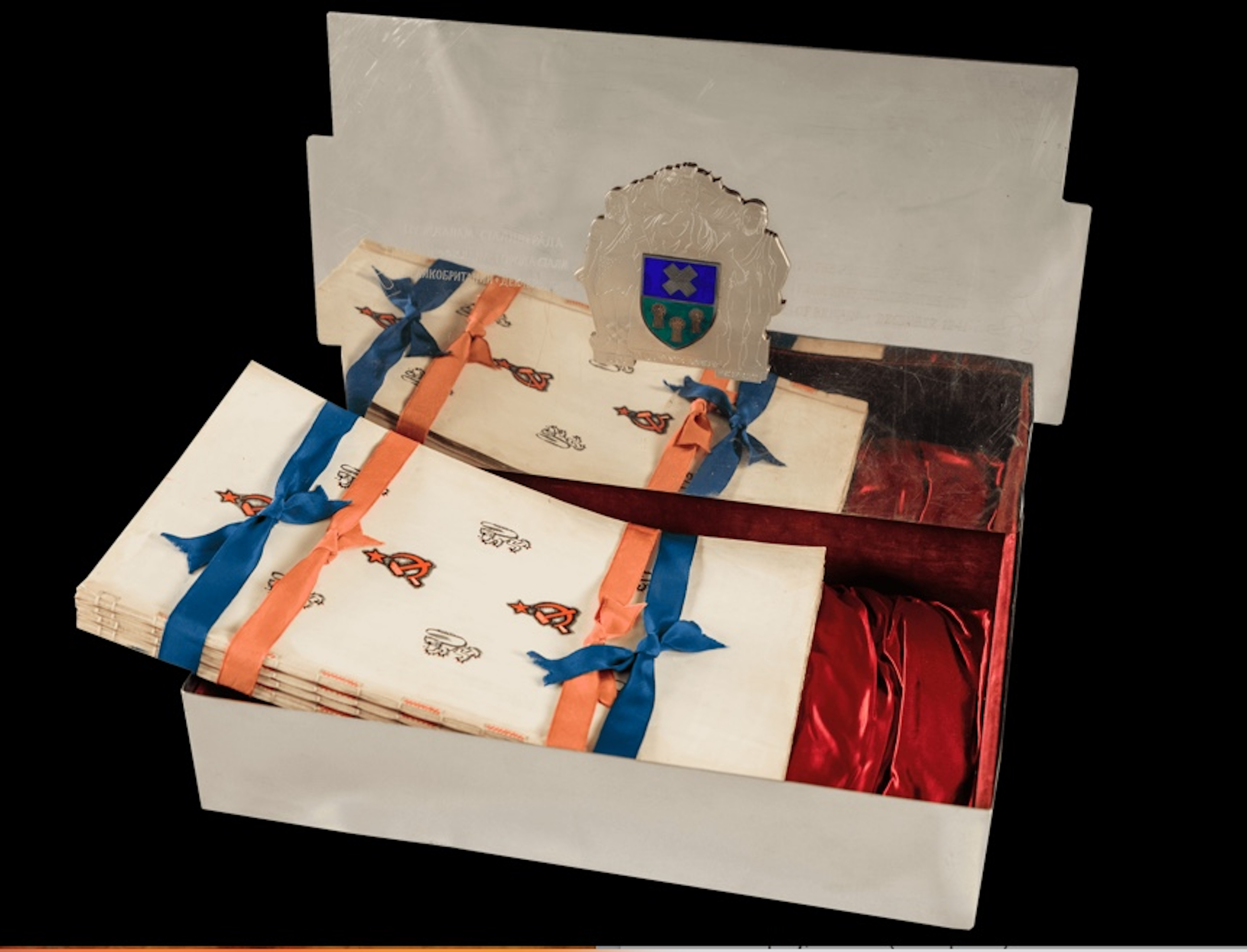
The Stalingrad Casket, 1943 (Volgograd Panorama Museum, Russia) ‘Staybrite’ stainless steel and enamel casket with illuminated manuscript.

A trip with her father in 1934 to the Soviet Union to view the decorative art collections held at the Hermitage and Kremlin had a lasting impression on her. In 1943 she was one of a group of Sheffield crafts people involved in the production of The Stalingrad Casket (Volgograd Panorama Museum, Russia).

== Personal life ==
Himsworth was fiercely individualistic, she never married and spent her entire adult life in her Sheffield home with its purpose built silversmithing studio. She was a strict vegetarian and a member of the Vegetarian Society. She was an advocate for women's rights, particularly in respect to the Goldsmiths’ Company, an institution where women were virtually excluded. Her campaigning during the 1940s paved the way to full recognition for female silversmiths and goldsmiths in 1983.

== Later life ==
Prior to the outbreak of World War Two she gave a series of lectures on Scandinavian silverware design to the Sheffield Silver Trade Technical Society. Her work was included in the ‘Britain Can Make It’ exhibition, held at the V&A Museum in London (Autumn 1946). Her silverware was included as part of the Cultural Festival (Applied Arts & Craft) in the art competition at the 1948 Summer Olympics. staged by the V&A Museum. Throughout the 1950s she exhibited her silverware with the Red Rose Guild of Craftsmen at venues across Yorkshire and Lancashire.

Himsworth ceased exhibiting her work in the 1960s but continued to make one-off pieces through to the mid-1970s. Following a highly successful career Sheffield City Museum organised a retrospective exhibition of her work at Weston Park Museum (1978). Following the success of that exhibition Himsworth bequeathed several key items and preparatory drawings to Sheffield City Museum (now Museums Sheffield).

Major pieces of her silverware are held by the Victoria & Albert Museum and The Worship Company of Goldsmiths in London. Joyce Himsworth died in Sheffield in 1989, aged 83. Her working papers, designs and archive were split between The Sheffield Assay Office, Museums Sheffield and Sheffield City Archives.
