= Herry Perry =

Graphic artist and printmaker

- Born: Anne Erica Thackeray Perry; 16 October 1897; Bolton, Manchester, England
- Died: 6 September 1962 (aged 64); Hampstead, London, England
- Education: Central School of Arts and Crafts
- Known for: Wood engraving Book illustration Map making
- Notable work: Transport for London posters
- Movement: Golden Age of Illustration

Heather "Herry" Perry (16 October 1897 – 6 September 1962) was a graphic artist, illustrator, and printmaker best known for her prolific design work for Transport for London and London Underground throughout the 1920s and 1930s.

== Biography ==
Herry Perry did not use her birth name, opting to use a shortened version of the first name "Heather" which came from her middle name, Erica, the Latin name of the heather plant. Her nickname likely followed naturally given the simplicity and rhyme of the name "Herry Perry," especially compared to the lengthy name she was given at birth. Her name occasionally appears as Herry-Perry.

=== Early life ===
Anne Erica Thackeray "Herry" Perry was born 16 October 1897, in Bolton, Manchester to Ottley Lane Perry and Viola Travers Perry. Her second middle name, Thackeray, was bestowed in honor of a family connection to Victorian novelist William Makepeace Thackeray. Herry was an only child until 1902 when the second of her parents' two daughters, Rosamund, was born. The girls' father, Major Ottley Lane Perry, was a prominent cotton merchant and councillor who eventually served as justice of the peace for the County of Middlesex and the Borough of Bolton. Additionally, he is credited with designing Bolton's first official coat of arms in 1890. His design remained the town's official coat of arms for several decades until 1958. The Perry family moved from Bolton to Kensington in 1900, and again to Roxwell in 1911. Throughout their childhoods, both Herry and her sister Rosamund were homeschooled by an educated governess.

=== Adulthood ===
Perry attended Central School of Arts and Crafts in London in the mid-to-late 1920s. Between 1924 and 1927, she studied alongside students like Joyce Clissold, John R. Biggs, Hilda Quick, and Frederica Graham. While studying in London Perry created numerous wood engravings that are still held by the school today, including Mrs. Budgett, Head of a Young Man, and Christmas Card Farm Scene. Her most notable work from this period is a large, 52 x 39 cm (20.5 x 15 in) wood engraving print of a cross-section of the Central School of Arts and Crafts building on Southampton Row, carved between 1925 and 1926. The witty print features the basement and all five stories of the school, filled with different artistic departments and many hidden jokes from the artist. Classrooms include jewelry and enameling, sculpture, writing and illuminating, typography, and costume; but no classroom is busier than the second room in the basement simply labeled "Women." Perry's Central School Print was reissued by Central St. Martins in 1990.

It is not clear when she began, but Perry briefly worked as a qualified Voluntary Aid Detachment (VAD) nurse. She remained on the official register of assistant nurses until 1945 and continued to work in the medical field during the post-war years.

=== Later life ===
In early 1950, Perry began renting an empty room in her home in Camden to a doctoral student at King's College named Bill Pearson. The pair were mostly friendly, though Pearson later said that Perry "really wanted someone who would occasionally take her out and share life with her friends," and he claimed he'd rather have been treated like a boarder. He rented the room for several years, the pair regularly having meals together for the length of his stay. Pearson was a closeted gay man and often brought married female friends to dinner at Perry's house in an attempt to stress his heterosexuality to his landlady, though there is no record of her suspicions of him nor disdain of such affairs. Notably, Bill Pearson was a student from New Zealand studying in the United Kingdom, and homosexuality was not decriminalized in either location until 1986 and 1967 respectively.

Perry died in Hampstead on 6 September 1962, at the age of 64, leaving her younger sister as her only surviving relative.

== Career ==
By the time she retired in the late 1950s, Perry's artistic portfolio included dozens of posters, wood engravings, drawings, playing card designs, book illustrations, maps, signs, murals, and more. She even contributed to the popular humor magazine Punch. In 1939, Perry was given the opportunity to design the General Post Office's annual Valentine's Day greetings telegram. Her design was the last Valentine's Day telegram form offered by the General Post Office until 1951 due to the complications and shortages that resulted from WWII.

Perry was an early member of the Society of Wood Engravers, an international organization dedicated to promoting the art of wood engraving by providing artists with public exhibitions to display their woodcut prints. She was a student of one of the group's founders, Noel Rooke. Perry was also heavily involved with the Arts and Crafts Exhibition Society.

=== Transport for London ===
Frank Pick, the administrator responsible for developing London Underground's visual identity in the early 20th century, spotted Perry's work in 1927 and hired her to design The Empire Under One Roof at The Imperial Institute. By the time Perry left Transport for London in 1938 she had completed more than fifty original posters for the organization. The majority of her posters were lithographs or wood engravings, though she was not afraid to experiment. For example, her poster for the 1935 Rugby Cup Final featured three rugby players collaged from London Underground tickets.

In 1929, she completed a series of five new maps of the London Underground for the areas of Hounslow, Edgware, South Harrow, Kew, and Morden. Several years later, she was chosen to illustrate numerous posters that advertised which flowers and fruits were in season in an attempt to encourage citizens to get outdoors and travel. These posters did not typically feature specific locations or timetables but highlighted seasonal plants like blackberries, crocuses, and bluebells. Some of her posters even discouraged people from picking wildflowers, with the slogan "Leave them for others to see!"

A 1934 campaign for the London Underground featured a series of posters by Perry that depicted the different things Londoners could enjoy, including theatres, restaurants, sightseeing, and socializing. She designed posters that featured the ticket prices and unique train schedules for special events like Wimbledon, Lord Mayor's Show, Crufts Dog Show, and Bertram Mills' Circus. Perry was also responsible for posters that highlighted military events like The Royal Tournament, RAF Displays, and Trooping the Colour.

A poster she designed for Derby Day in 1934 featured her interpretation of Paolo Uccello's The Battle of San Romano. The bottom left corner had a small line of text from Perry that read: "...with apologies to Paolo Uccello" presumably in reference to her lighthearted take on his work. That wasn't the first time she used the map dedication for a little comedy, as she dedicated the map of Kew "To Bucephalus," Alexander the Great's horse.

=== Books illustrations ===
Perry found time to add book illustration to her vast design portfolio soon after leaving art school in the late 1920s. In 1933, she was commissioned to illustrate the handbook Entertaining with Elizabeth Craig. Elizabeth Craig was a popular homemaker, chef, and writer of dozens of books and cookbooks published through the 1980s. Perry created numerous magenta, black, and orange prints for the book that served as cover pages for chapters with names like "Bathing Party (mixed)" and "Tennis Party."

Following the outbreak of war in 1939, Perry collaborated with David York to publish a lighthearted medical guide titled First Aid for First Aiders: Or, "What'll I do?". Perry's typical witty illustrations accompanied fellow VAD medic David York's observations. The cover features a black line drawing of the authors facing one another, with the cover's only color radiating from York's bright red hands.

- Lawrence and The Arabs, Robert Graves, 1927.
- Lighter London, Hubert Steel, 1930.
- Entertaining with Elizabeth Craig, Elizabeth Craig, 1933.
- Animals Limited, James Cook, 1933.
- First Aid for First Aiders: Or, "What'll I do?", Herry Perry and David York, 1939.

An oil painting of New Zealander Bill Pearson painted by Herry Perry in 1952 serves as the cover of the biography No Fretful Sleeper: A Life of Bill Pearson written by Paul Millar in 2013.

=== Murals ===
In 1932, Perry was commissioned by Sir John Russell to paint a semi-circular mural at Rothamsted Experimental Station, one of the oldest agricultural research stations in the world. The mural was completed on Derby Day that year and featured a timeline from medieval agriculture to 1930s agricultural research. She was paid £50 for her work, the 2022 equivalent of approximately £2,700.

Between 1933 and 1935, Perry was contracted by Cunard-White Star to paint a series of murals for the second-class children's playroom on the ocean liner RMS Queen Mary. Other artists who were commissioned to work on the RMS Queen Mary at around the same time as Perry included Edward Wadsworth, Dame Laura Knight, Vanessa Bell, Anna Zinkeisen, and Gilbert Bayes.

Perry completed the Queen Mary murals from her studio in Swiss Cottage and subsequently had them sent over to the ship. One of these murals featured her interpretation of Noah's Ark finally finding land, complete with a parade of animals of all varieties exiting the boat. Perry's ark was registered to 'Liverpool' and featured telephone wires, a kangaroo waving Australia's flag, and an impatient beaver pushing a slow penguin out of the way. The ship sat upon a large boulder that served as a chalkboard for the children in the nursery.

When the RMS Queen Mary was repurposed to carry soldiers in World War II, the nursery rooms were converted to offices. Perry's jungle murals remain in the background of several war-time images of men at work on the ship.

=== Shop signs ===
In her older age in the 1950s, Perry's design clients expanded to include many London-area shop owners and barkeeps. At the time, the Rural Industries Bureau was encouraging all shop owners to update their signs to prepare for the coronation of Queen Elizabeth II, especially those that featured the word "Queen" in their names. Perry designed dozens of pub signs around London during this time, often using her boarder (Bill Pearson) as a model for the men she painted. Most, if not all, of Perry's handpainted signs have since fallen victim to animals, weather, and time, though limited images and a short list of her sign credits remain.

- Hearts of Oak public house, London.
- Load of Hay, Haverstock Hill.
- The Queen's Head & Artichoke, Marylebone.
- The Saracen's Head, Margate.

== Exhibitions ==
During her lifetime, Perry showcased her work in exhibitions held by the Society of Wood Engravers and Arts and Crafts Exhibition Society and at locations like London's Redfern Gallery.

=== Royal Academy Exhibitions ===
Perry was represented in both the 1928 and 1930 Royal Academy Exhibitions. Her 1928 entry was a house map on vellum paper, displayed near the works of Ethelwyn Baker, Dorothy Hutton, Ella Naper, George Edward Hunt, and Mabel Chadburn. She exhibited at least two works at the 1930 show: a fruit farm map that had been commissioned by the Ministry of Agriculture, and an estate map that was likely based on property owned by philanthropist Sir Julien Cahn as it required his permission to be entered in the exhibition.

A handful of Perry's work was included in the Royal Academy's Exhibition of British Art in Industry in 1935. Gallery four of the exhibition was dedicated to the designs of furniture and carpets, and the nursery furniture exhibit featured a set of toys created by Perry. Several of the posters she designed for Transport of London were also displayed in the commercial art section of the show. A lacewood doorstop carved by Herry Perry was included in the Arts and Crafts Exhibition Society's 50th Anniversary Exhibition in 1938.

=== Posthumous shows and publications ===
Perry's art continues to be featured in art exhibitions and publications. Most recently, her posters have been included in shows curated specifically to showcase forgotten women designers and artists. The following is an incomplete list of exhibitions and publications that have featured Perry's work since her death in 1962:

- English Poetry of the Second World War by Catherine Reilly, 1986.
- Underground Art: London Transport Posters 1908 to Present by Oliver Green, 2001.
- A Century of Creative Women, London Transport Museum, 2015.
- Poster Girls – A Century of Art and Design, London Transport Museum, 2017.
- I Don't Know Her Name But I Know Her Work, Central Saint Martins, 2017–18.

== Collections ==
The London Transport Museum holds the largest public collection of Perry's work, and regularly offers lectures and educational opportunities that include information about her travel posters. The museum counts nearly one hundred of her works in its collections, including original maps, posters, and book illustrations. Her work can also be found at the Yale Center for British Art, the Museum of Modern Art, the Victoria and Albert Museum, and the University of the Arts London.

=== Maps ===
- A New Chart of the Royal Zoological Society's Gardens in Regent's Park, commonly called The Zoo, 1927, Zoological Society of London.
- Morden (London Underground), 1929, Victoria and Albert Museum.
- Kew (London Underground), 1929, London Transport Museum.
- Hounslow (London Underground), 1929, London Transport Museum.
- South Harrow (London Underground), 1929, London Transport Museum.
- Edgware (London Underground), 1929, London Transport Museum.
- London: Thou Art The Flower of Cities All (Great Western Railway), 1929, London Transport Museum.

=== Posters ===
- The Empire Under One Roof at The Imperial Institute, 1927, London Transport Museum.
- Chestnut Sunday, 1931, London Transport Museum.
- Orpheus at Whipsnade, 1933, London Transport Museum.
- The Royal Tournament, 1935, Museum of Modern Art.
- Boat Race, 6 April, 2:45 pm, 1935, London Transport Museum.
- Cruft's Dog Show, 1937, Victoria and Albert Museum.
- Country Joys from Victoria Station, 1930, Yale Center for British Art.

=== Other art ===
- Central School Print, 1925, University of the Arts London.
- Lawrence and the Arabs by Robert Graves (maps), 1927, Mannerheim Museum.
- Safety first, High Street, Ellesmore, c. 1928, University of the Arts London.
- Japanese Garden at The National Stud, 1930, Victoria and Albert Museum.
- Valentine's Day greetings telegram, 1939, The Postal Museum London.
- First Aid for First Aiders: Or, "What'll I do?" by Herry Perry and David York, 1939, Imperial War Museum.
