= Matthew Stevenson (poet) =

English poet and cavalier wit

Matthew Stevenson, also referred to as Mathew Stevenson (died 1684) was an English poet and a member of the circle of cavalier wits who frequented the lawcourts following the Restoration. He was buried at St Mary in the Marsh, Norwich.

== Publications ==
Stevenson's publications included:

- Occasion's Offspring, or, Poems upon Severall Occasions (1654)
- The twelve moneths, or, A pleasant and profitable discourse of every action, whether of labour or recreation, proper to each particular moneth
- Bellum presbyteriale, or, As much said for the presbyter as may be, together with their covenants catastrophe, held forth in an heroick poem (1661).
- Florus Britannicus, or, An exact epitome of the history of England from William the Conqueror to the twelfth year of the reign of his sacred majesty Charls the Second now flourishing (1662)
- Norfolk drollery, or, A complete collection of the newest songs, jovial poems, and catches, &c. (1673), (republished as Poems in 1673 and The Wits in 1685).
