= Miles Balmford Sharp =

English painter

- Born: 28 November 1897; Brighouse, Yorkshire, England
- Died: 20 January 1973 (aged 75); Exmouth, Devon, England
- Occupation: Painter

Miles Balmford Sharp (28 November 1897 – 20 January 1973) was an English artist from Brighouse, Yorkshire. He studied at the Central School of Art and Design.

Sharp was a painter in oil paint and watercolour, focusing mainly on landscapes and architecture. Alongside his painting practice Sharp was also a keen etcher, engraver and lithograph artist.

Sharp exhibited widely including exhibiting works at the Royal Academy, London, England. Royal West of England Academy and Birmingham Society of Artists.

From 14 May – 12 June 1937, Sharp had a large scale exhibition at The Foyles Gallery Charing Cross Road, London, titled English Landscapes, an exhibition of oil paintings and engravings of English landscapes, including forty-seven oil paintings, and ten etchings and line engravings.

The works often depicted his surroundings in Nuneaton with this exhibition containing works depicting George Eliot's birthplace, and hospitals and rural settings in and around Warwickshire. These local scenes were painted later in his career when he took up a position as Principal of the Nuneaton Art School between 1925–1952. Some of the watercolours made during this period were exhibited in Nuneaton Museum & Art Gallery in the exhibition Moments in time.

More recently, Sharp's work was included in the BBC project Your Paintings, later renamed Art UK, which aims to allow easy access to painting in public collections online.
