= Mabel Allington Royds =

English printmaker

Mabel Royds
- Portrait of Mabel Royds (1911) by Ernest Lumsden
- Born: 3 April 1874; Little Barford, England
- Died: 22 November 1941 (aged 67); Edinburgh, Scotland
- Known for: Printmaking
- Spouse: Ernest Stephen Lumsden (m. 1913)

Mabel Allington Royds (1874–1941) was an English artist best known for her woodcuts.

== Life ==
She grew up in Liverpool. At age fifteen, Royds was awarded a scholarship to attend the Royal Academy in London but instead decided on the Slade School, where she studied under the tutelage of Henry Tonks. Royds moved to Paris, where she trained with the painter and printmaker Walter Sickert. She then went to Canada where she taught for several years at the Havergal College in Toronto. In 1911, Royds settled in Edinburgh where she taught at the Edinburgh College of Art, then under the directorship of Frank Morley Fletcher, under whose influence she took up making colour woodcuts. In 1913 she married the etcher Ernest Lumsden, who also taught at Edinburgh, and together they travelled through Europe, the Middle East and India. In 1921 Royds exhibited at the newly-formed Society of Graphic Art in London.

== Woodcuts ==
Upon her arrival to the Edinburgh College of Art under the tutelage of Frank Morley Fletcher, Royds began creating colour woodcuts. Fletcher taught classes on the traditional Japanese ukiyo-e printmaking process, but rather than having three people collaborate on a print (artist, artisan, printer), he taught the artists how to manage all three stages independently. For many British artists working in this medium during the early twentieth century, Fletcher’s prints, teachings and writings led the way.

Royds's individualistic approach to her woodcuts – applying pigments to printing blocks using a brush rather than a roller – resulted in unique variations of each of her prints. Additionally, Royds preferred to produce on demand, rather than creating limited edition runs, further ensuring a one-of-a-kind piece. To prepare, Royds often created coloured paper collages before her final drawing. Although cherry wood was ideal, Royds usually used Woolworth’s sixpenny pastry boards – a cheaper alternative. Despite this, Royds' prints remained professional and sophisticated, proving her mastery of the technique. After carving the woodblocks, she printed impressions by rubbing the sheet with a Japanese barren. In her later works, Royds would either eliminate the keyblock entirely or print it in multiple colours – creating direct relationships between the colors instead of having them separated by borders.

== Subjects ==
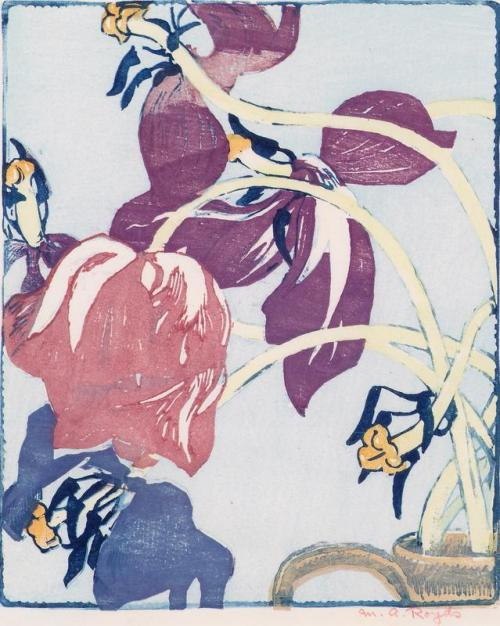
Dead Tulips, Aberdeen Art Gallery

Well known works include the Knife Grinders, Housetops, and the Boat Builders, all scenes of India created in around 1920–30. Her woodcuts of flowers, dating from around 1930 to 1933, including Cineraria, Honeysuckle and Columbine, are also well known.

Because her husband was not allowed to join the British army for medical reasons, he instead served with the Indian army – allowing for extensive travel throughout India and the Himalayas, which would serve as inspiration for the subjects of many of Royds's woodcuts throughout the 1920s. Some India-inspired prints include scenes of children watching street musicians, women filling water vessels, and men tending to goat herds – a sample of tasks from everyday life there.

Despite the inspirations from Royds’s extensive travel through other countries, she also enjoyed depicting the simple things that surrounded her home: children growing up, neighbourhood animals, and flowers in bloom. By the 1930s, Royds found a new subject in the many varieties of flowers depicted in dazzling colours made with powdered color ground and a ready-made bought medium, rather than the traditional Japanese rice flour paste. Between the years of 1933 and 1938, Royds created a vibrant and lively flower series – using contrasting colors and hard lines to guide the viewer’s eyes through the composition. Whether at home or abroad, Royds’s subjects are derived from the often overlooked moments of everyday life.

== List of works ==
- Honeysuckle, c. 1936, colour woodcut on paper.
- White Lilies, exh. 1937, colour woodcut on paper.
- Water Carriers, Benares, c. 1920, colour woodcut on paper.
- Choir Boys (Xmas Greeting1898), 1898, woodcut on paper.
- Cat with T Square and Shield (cut from a theatre programme), unknown, woodcut on paper.
- Christmas Morning (or The Stocking), unknown, colour woodcut on paper.
- Little Girl with Bowl of Fruit (or Marjorie), unknown, colour woodcut on paper.
- Cyclamen, exh. 1933, colour woodcut on paper.
- Water Lilies, c. 1938, colour woodcut on paper.
- Trees on a Slope, unknown, colour woodcut on paper.
- Magnolia, c. 1936, colour woodcut on paper.
- Tiger Lilies, exh. 1936, colour woodcut on paper.
- Artichoke, c. 1935, colour woodcut on paper.
- The Red Mug, exh. 1934, colour woodcut on paper.
- Red Daisies, c. 1936, colour woodcut on paper.
- Snowdrops, c. 1935, colour woodcut on paper.
- Foxgloves, c. 1934, colour woodcut on paper.
- Prickly Pear Cactus, c. 1924, colour woodcut on paper.
- Dead Tulips, c. 1934, colour woodcut on paper.
- House-top, c. 1924, colour woodcut on paper.
- Goat Herd, c. 1920, colour woodcut on paper.
- The Waterfall, c. 1938, colour woodcut on paper.
- Cineraria, exh. 1932, colour woodcut on paper.
- Columbines, c. 1935, colour woodcut on paper.
- Bathers, Benares, c. 1922, colour woodcut on paper.
- Angels Appearing to Shepherds, c. 1938, colour woodcut on paper.
- Cactus Rocks, St. Abbs, c. 1938, colour woodcut on paper.
