= Ashwell Bury =

Country house in Hertfordshire, England

Coordinates: 52°02′39″N 00°09′20″W

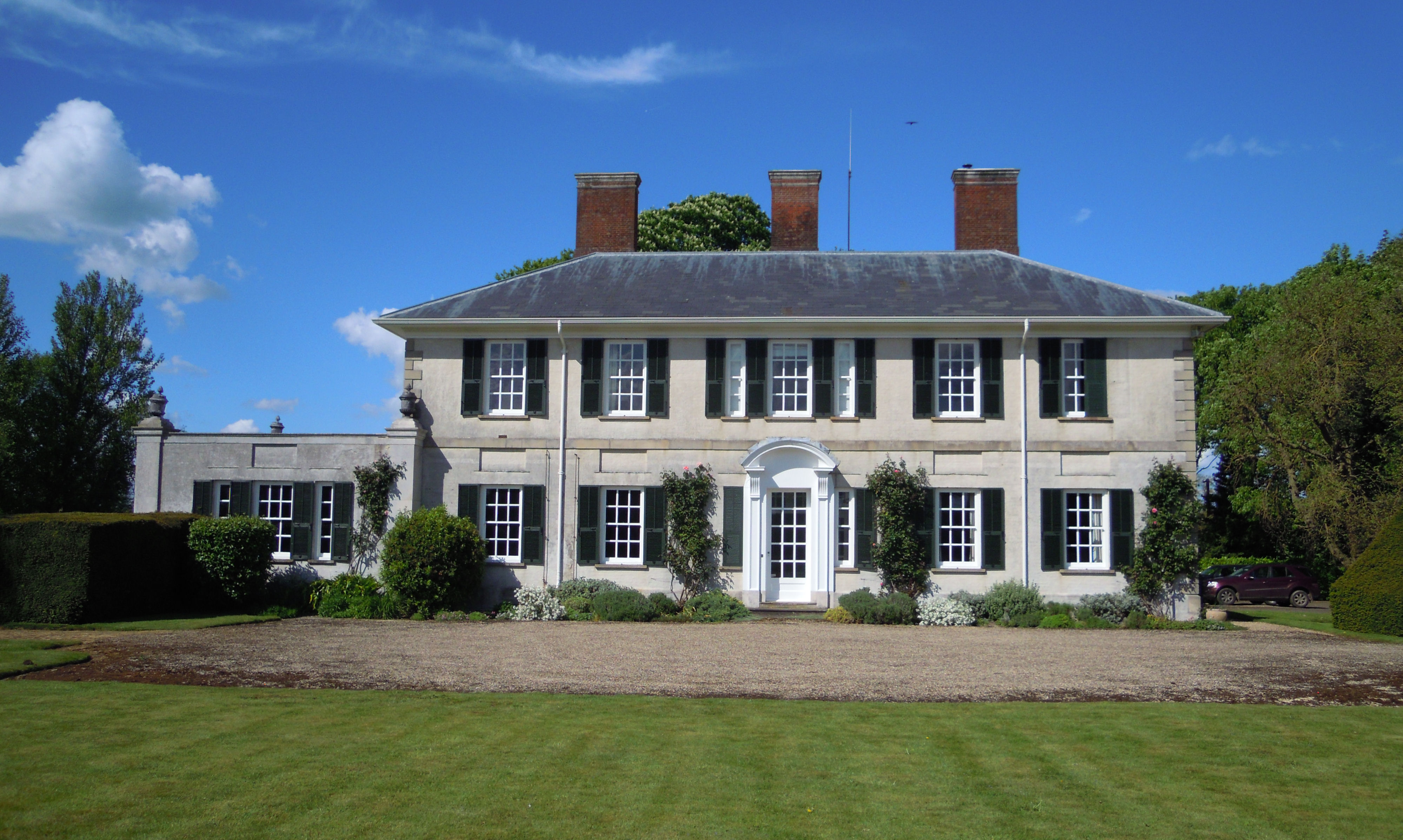
Ashwell Bury in 2017

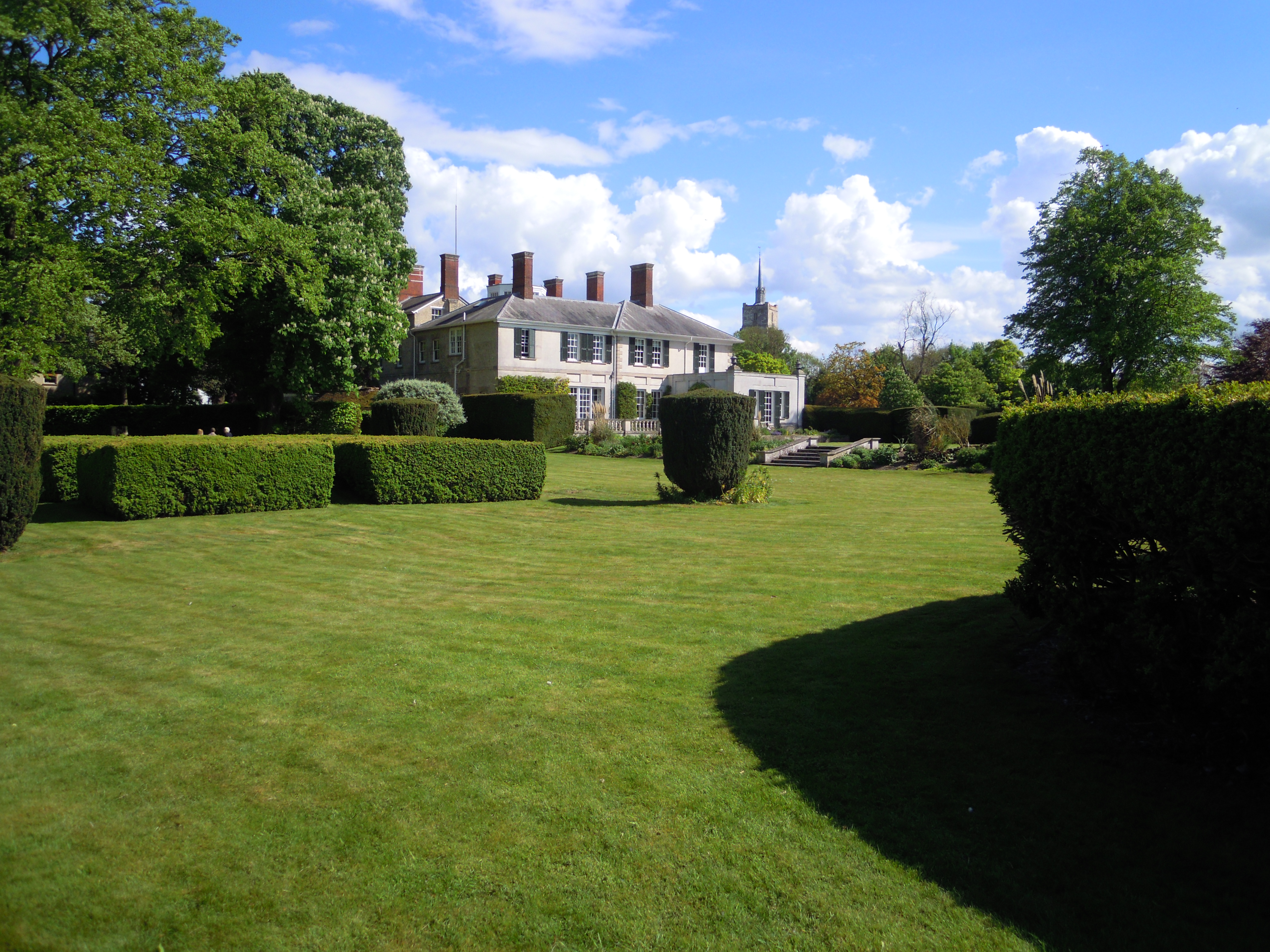
View of the house from the grounds

Ashwell Bury, at Ashwell in Hertfordshire, England, is an early 19th-century house of white brick, perhaps originally built before 1836 for Edward George Fordham (1782–1868); altered c. 1860 for Edward King Fordham (1810–99), who extended the family landholding; and then further remodelled in 1922–1926, chiefly inside, by Sir Edwin Lutyens for Phyllis Fordham, who had grown up at Henlow Grange.

The house is of two storeys and five bays, but the central bay is wide, with a triple sash window above the front door. Lutyens replaced the cornice with eaves but retained the existing slate roof and chimneystacks, inserted new sash windows and covered the brick with a white cement. His most notable addition is the new staircase hall, which gives the house an effective focus and a touch of grandeur. It was fitted into a square rear courtyard and has an octagonal lantern and glazed internal windows on three sides of the first floor with mirror glass on the fourth. The lowest steps of the stair fill the full width of the well, before narrowing to the width of the second and third flights. Two other rooms have Lutyens chimneypieces.

== Gardens ==
The gardens were altered by Gertrude Jekyll in 1908–09. They are registered as Grade II.
