= Hemsworth (surname) =

Hemsworth is an English surname.

People with the surname include:

- The Hemsworth family:
  - Chris Hemsworth (born 1983), Australian actor, brother of Liam and Luke, father of India Rose
    - India Rose Hemsworth (born 2012), British actress, daughter of Chris
  - Liam Hemsworth (born 1990), Australian actor, brother of Chris and Luke, uncle of India Rose
  - Luke Hemsworth (born 1980), Australian actor, brother of Chris and Liam, uncle of India Rose
  - Rob Hemsworth (fl. 2010s), Australian oyster farmer, chef, and contestant on My Kitchen Rules series 6, cousin of Luke, Chris, and Liam
- Gerard Hemsworth (1945–2021), British academic, contemporary artist, and painter
- John Hemsworth (1958–1998), Irish-American plumber and police brutality victim
- Ryan Hemsworth (born 1990), Canadian DJ and record producer
- Wade Hemsworth (1916–2002), Canadian folk singer-songwriter and musician
