= Rachel Yallop =

British artist

Rachel Yallop is a British artist who specialises in typography and calligraphy. Yallop studied at Ravensbourne College and the Central School of Art and Design, and gained an MA in 1985. She uses mixed media and often uses letters abstractly, using their shapes to create large dynamic designs.

Yallop's typography has been used on a range of commercial products including Heinz soups and Cadbury chocolate. She has been a freelance calligrapher and lettering designer for more than 25 years. Yallop is a Member of the Royal Birmingham Society of Artists, Founder Member of Letter Exchange, and an Honoured Fellow of the Calligraphy and Lettering Arts Society.
