= Frank Morley Fletcher =

English painter

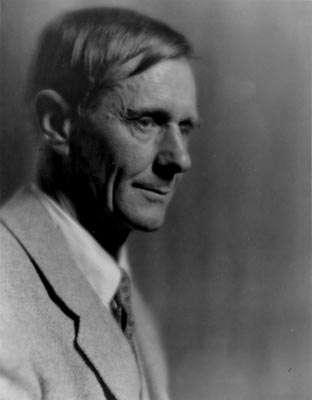
Frank Morley Fletcher.

Frank Morley Fletcher (1866–1949), often referred to as F. Morley Fletcher, was an English painter and printmaker known primarily for his role in introducing Japanese colored woodcut printing as an important genre in Western art.

Frank Fletcher was educated at the University of London followed by work at St John's Wood Art School and in the studio of Hubert Vos. He continued his art studies in Paris at the atelier of Fernand Cormon in 1888. There his exposure to the Japanese colour woodblock print led to a career in teaching and development of the subject. A student of his was the fellow woodblock print exponent, Allen W. Seaby. He influenced the woodcut artist Eric Slater, the botanical artist Lilian Snelling, and the Scottish artist Adam Bruce Thomson.

Fletcher taught in London and Reading schools, and from 1907 to 1923 was director of the Edinburgh College of Art, where the printmaker Helen Stevenson was among his students. He published Wood block printing: A description of the craft of Woodcutting and Colourprinting in 1916 which helped spread knowledge of Japanese woodcut prints in California and Britain.

In 1924, Fletcher became school director of the Santa Barbara School of the Arts in California, United States. He resigned as director in the spring of 1930 and eventually moved to Los Angeles where he continued to teach, paint, and exhibit.

In the late 1930s, Fletcher's eyesight began to fail and his output became more sporadic. He moved to Ojai in the early 1940s and he died there on 2 November 1950.

He was a brother of English physiologist Walter Morley Fletcher.
