= Margaret Pilkington =

British printmaker (1891–1974)

Margaret Pilkington OBE
- Born: 25 November 1891
- Died: 2 August 1974 (aged 82)
- Education: Slade School of Fine Art; Central School of Art and Design
- Known for: Wood engraving
- Relatives: Richard Evans (1778–1864) (great-grandfather) Charles Pilkington and Richard Pilkington (uncles)
- Awards: OBE (1956)

Margaret Pilkington (25 November 1891 – 2 August 1974) was a British wood-engraver who was active at the beginning of the twentieth century. She was a pupil of Noel Rooke at the Central School of Art and Design and was a member of the Society of Wood Engravers and the Red Rose Guild. She was awarded the OBE in 1956.

== Background ==
Pilkington was born into a wealthy family, the Pilkingtons of the Pilkington Glassworks and Pilkington Tile Company. In 1913 she went to study at the Slade School of Fine Art, London where she was taught wood engraving by Lucien Pissarro. In 1914 she went on to the Central School of Art and Design, London to study wood engraving under Noel Rooke.

== Charitable activities ==
From early in her life she promoted a number of social projects, girls' clubs, a Pioneer Club for professional girls and women, and, most notably, the Red Rose Guild.

In 1920 she organised an exhibition for designer craftsmen in Manchester and from this the guild developed. Early members and exhibitors included Ethel Mairet, Katherine Pleydell-Bouverie, Bernard Leach and Muriel Bell. The guild was a sponsor of the fledgling Craft Centre of Great Britain when it was founded in 1947.

In 1925 she was invited to become a member of the Council of the Whitworth Art Gallery. She became more and more involved with the Gallery, running it for a period, and was an honorary director for over 20 years.

She spent a great deal of time with her sister Dorothy, neither of whom married. She was always worried about the disparity between her wealth and the economic distress that she saw around her. Much of her life, and money, was devoted to charitable works in the Manchester area. One lasting legacy lies in the purchase by the sisters of Alderley Woods in 1943 in memory of their parents; they presented the woods to the National Trust. Dorothy died in 1971, and Margaret in 1974.

== Wood engravings ==
Noel Rooke's students at the Central School were prominent in those very early years of the wood engraving revival, as members of the Society of Wood Engravers, as contributors to books and as illustrators of books. Pilkington exhibited in the first exhibition of the Society of Wood Engravers in 1920, and continued to do so until 1931. She became a member of the society in 1921.

In 1919 Malcolm Salaman included her wood engravings in his Studio anthology. In 1922 she contributed a wood engraving to Contemporary English Woodcuts, an anthology of wood engravings produced by Thomas Balston, a director at Duckworth and an enthusiast for the new style of wood engravings. Campbell Dodgson, Keeper of Prints and Drawings at the British Museum, wrote about her in his introduction to the book: Miss Gribble and Miss Pilkington are among the other women artists who practise wood engraving with zeal and success.

She produced some 110 wood engravings, 41 of which were for the four books that she illustrated, three written by her father, Lawrence Pilkington, the last by a friend. In 1924 she produced 15 wood engravings for a book of poetry by her father, An Alpine Valley and other poems. In 1926 she engraved the frontispiece for Tattlefold and in 1928 another frontispiece for The Chimneys of Tattleton. In that year she also engraved 24 illustrations for Hills and Highways by her childhood friend Katharine Chorley.

Her work is represented in several national collections, including the Central School and the Whitworth.

== Overview ==
Pilkington's output is quite limited when compared to many of her contemporaries, and her importance lies not in her production or artistic merit, but in her encouragement to and patronage of her fellow practitioners. She was Secretary of the Society of Wood Engravers from 1924 and revived the moribund society in 1949. She was chairman from 1952 to 1967. She bought regularly at the annual exhibitions of the society and donated the wood engravings to the Whitworth.

She was elected to membership of the Manchester Literary and Philosophical Society on 1 January 1951 (5 years after her sister) and was President of the Society 1964–66.

Her influence is best summed up in her obituary by Trenchard Cox, director of the Victoria and Albert Museum: Her generous outlook on human affairs, her wide knowledge and discriminating taste, were reflected in every part of the museum (the Whitworth) which she made so much her own.

Professional and academic associations
Preceded by Leonard Cohen	President of the Manchester Literary and Philosophical Society; 1964–66	Succeeded by Horace Hayhurst
