= James Bostock (painter) =

British painter

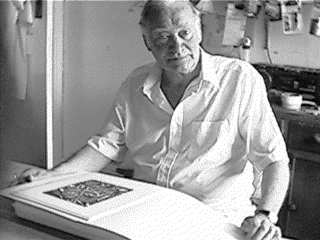
- Bostock in his studio
- Born: 11 June 1917; Hanley, England
- Died: 26 May 2006 (aged 88); Margate, England
- Occupation: Painter

James Bostock (11 June 1917 – 26 May 2006) was a British painter. His work was part of the painting event in the art competition at the 1948 Summer Olympics.

== Life ==
James Bostock (Hanley, Staffs 11 June 1917 - Margate, Kent 26 May 2006) was a British wood-engraver and artist. He was born in Hanley, Staffs, the son of William George Bostock (d.1948) pottery and glass-worker, and Amy (née Titley, d.1976). He was brought up in Kent and attended Borden Grammar School, Sittingbourne, and later, Medway School of Art in Rochester. From 1936 to 1939 he undertook post-graduate study at the Royal College of Art where his tutors included Edward Bawden, Eric Ravilious, Paul Nash and John Nash. It was there that he first became attracted to printmaking, and especially wood engraving. He was awarded RCA certificates in etching, wood engraving and lithography, and the ARCA diploma.

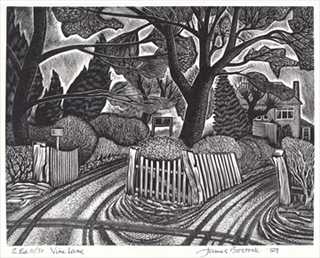
A wood engraving of Vine Lane in Hillingdon

After distinguished war service he began to produce wood engravings which were soon recognised for their fine craftsmanship and artistic individuality. By 1950 he had been elected a member of both the Royal Society of Painter-Etchers and Engravers (later the Royal Society of Painter-Printmakers) and the Society of Wood Engravers. He exhibited regularly at the annual exhibitions of these societies and his work was often included in the Royal Academy summer shows. Museums and international institutions acquired his wood engravings and Bostock quietly secured his position within the print world.

For over thirty years James Bostock combined an artistic career with that of a full-time teacher and administrator. Notwithstanding his academic commitments, as well as the inevitable demands of bringing up a family of three boys, Bostock produced a remarkable oeuvre of paintings and prints. However, it was not until retirement in 1978, and a resultant flurry of artistic activity, that James Bostock's work came before a wider audience. His work is to be found in the British Museum, the Victoria and Albert Museum, the British Council collection, the Hunt Botanical Library, Pittsburgh and many private collections

Exhibitions of his paintings and prints occurred regularly and the wood engravings were shown at the exhibitions of the Society of Wood Engravers. Sadly, by 1988, deteriorating eyesight and the onset of arthritis caused him to cease wood engraving - although, even then, he still painted and drew with vigour. The wood engravings continued to be shown at exhibitions and, in 1996, Bostock was one of nineteen major artists to be included in an exhibition arranged by Hilary Paynter (Chairman of the Society of Wood Engravers) at the Bankside Gallery, London. This exhibition featured artists who were members of both The Royal Society of Painter-Printmakers and the Society of Wood Engravers. In 1997, Bostock's work was included in Hal Bishop's landmark exhibition at Exeter Museum, Twentieth-Century British Wood Engraving: A Celebration... and a Dissenting Voice. This exhibition received an Arts Council award and is possibly the most important display of British wood engraving to occur during this period.

== Printmaking and illustration ==
Bostock is a wood engraver, an artist and a craftsman in technique. His engraving of cacti shows classical form interpretations of pure engraving. "Bostock's eye and burin can sharpen a form and make it too easy to see, beautiful to read and a memorable encounter. He has the ability to compress the form to square inches." [Self Portrait] of Bostock is painted with a burin, achieving the volumetric egg from rendering a light beam hitting a solid object. The main interest shown in the portrait of the author is the pure volumetric expression with the minimum number of lines, conveying a taut, wire-like quality. Bostock's portrait is plastic fluidity...the volume-tric bird caught in a cage. Engravers have experimented with materials other than boxwood. Bostock has produced engravings on Perspex, vulcanite and xylonite.

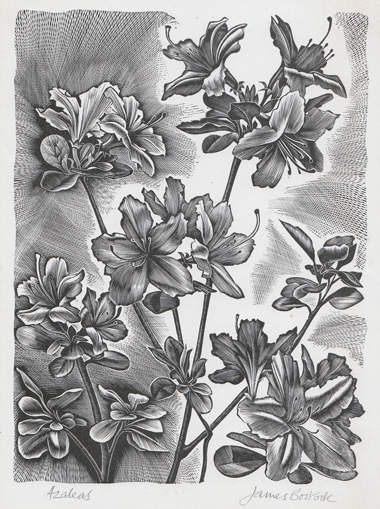
A wood engraving of Azaleas

Bostock begins a sort of ‘apostolic succession’, for he taught Kenneth Lindley, who re-directed blackline engraving and taught Ray Hedger. In 1936, he went up to the Royal College of Art where he was officially doing mural decoration, with etching, wood engraving and lithograph. "Paul Nash was at the college every Thursday and available to any student who took the trouble to take a folio to his room. Once I visited him and in a tutorial of about 1½ hours I think learned more about Art than from anyone else. He made such a vivid impression that I could relate in some detail what he told me all those years ago".

Bostock chose to print small editions by hand burnishing, normally about 30 or 40 impressions. Some blocks that were experimental, or to be used commercially, were not editioned. About five to ten proofs were printed from these blocks, they were usually signed. In some cases where demand was high, Bostock printed a further 10 to 30 impressions from the block as a second, and sometimes a third, edition. However, the editions rarely amount to more than 60 impressions in total. Bostock was often experimental in his approach to technique. Economic as well as innovative considerations led him to use a variety of materials as a matrix as well as the usual boxwood, endgrain block. During the I950s and 1960s Bostock experimented with colour on a few blocks, usually by overprinting with linoblocks. Although achieving some remarkable results Bostock considered that a black and white image was always more powerful.

In 1988 Bostock provided twelve small wood engraved prints to illustrate a reprint of poems by the poet, Edward Thomas.
