= Juliet Wood =

British painter (born 1939)

- Born: Juliet Anne Wood; June 4, 1939; London, England
- Occupation: Painter
- Style: Figurative art
- Spouse: Simon Brett (m. 1974)

Juliet Anne Wood (born 1939) is a British figurative painter whose work includes portraiture, drawings, and oil paintings. Her career spans more than five decades, during which she has taught art, undertaken portrait commissions, and exhibited in galleries in the United Kingdom. Her works have appeared in exhibitions at venues including the Royal Society of Portrait Painters and the Bankside Gallery, and a number are held in public and private collections, including the Royal Society of Edinburgh.

== Early life and education ==
Wood was born in London in 1939. She attended the Arts Educational Schools and later studied at St Alban’s School of Art. She continued her training at the Slade School of Fine Art, studying under William Coldstream and Maurice Feild. Subsequently, she spent a postgraduate year in Italy, immersing herself in the study of Renaissance masters.

== Career ==
Wood taught art at Marlborough College, Kingsbury Hill House School, Heriots Wood Grammar School for Girls, and Swindon School of Art and Design, where she taught for 17 years.

Her first portrait commission was for the BBC Everyman documentary in 1977. Other commissions include a portrait of mathematician Sir Michael Atiyah, held at the Royal Society of Edinburgh with a study held in the Scottish National Portrait Gallery.

Wood has exhibited in a range of group and solo exhibitions. These include:

- Alone and Together, Brunel's People (Menier Gallery, 2013)
- From the Slade: Through Time (Oxford, 2016)
- Music, Beaches, Family (White Horse Gallery, 2017)
- A Human Touch (Bankside Gallery, 2019)
- From Drawing joint exhibition with wood engraver Simon Brett (White Horse Gallery, 2023)

== Personal life ==
Wood was born to cardiologist Paul Wood and his wife Elizabeth (née Guthrie). She settled in Marlborough, Wiltshire. While teaching at Marlborough College in the early 1970s, she met the wood engraver Simon Brett. They married in 1974, had one daughter and remained together for more than fifty years until his death in December 2024. Wood also has four children from her earlier marriage to the artist Richard Shirley Smith.

== Publications ==
- Wood, Juliet (2019). A Human Touch. Paulinus Press. ISBN 9780907740230.
- Wood, Juliet (2013). Alone and Together, Brunel's People. Oblong Creative. ISBN 9780955657696.
