= Andy English =

English wood-engraver

Andy English (born 1956) is an English wood-engraver and educator who pioneered the use of the Internet to teach a wider audience about wood-engraving and how to do it.

== Biography ==
Andy English was born in Denver, a small village in Norfolk, England in 1956. He studied Geology at the University of Reading and taught in Cambridge, England from 1979–2006 where he was widely respected. Self-taught as an artist, he drew and painted since childhood but, in 1991, he started to engrave on endgrain wood. This immediately became his main artistic output. A 2008 article by Paul Wheatley describes how, after trying various printmaking methods, English engraved for the first time and found it to be so natural and comfortable that he could only describe it as remembering a process rather than learning it.

Andy was elected to the Society of Wood Engravers in 1997. He is also an elected member of the Cambridge Drawing Society.

While studying for a master of Arts at the University of London in the early 1980s, Andy researched the use of online information systems. He was an early user of the Internet in Britain and, always the educator, developed a website that explained how wood engravings are created, introducing many people to this method of printmaking for the first time. The presentation of the material has gradually been refined over many years and his new website has many photographs of the process to aid students of engraving.

Andy is a notable engraver. His detailed images often contain visual puns and hidden elements. Typical subjects include gardens, wildlife and childhood. He has illustrated many books, including two for Barbarian Press of Canada. "Hoi Barbaroi", the 25th anniversary biography of the press describes Andy as "an enthusiastic, congenial & Intelligent Illustrator".

Andy English is also an important designer and engraver of bookplates. Paul Weaver describes him as working unhurried and in detail through a lens before printing the bookplates in a Victorian handpress.
