= Meadowridge School =

Location
- 12224 240th St, Maple Ridge, British Columbia, V4R 1N1; Canada; 49.2242°N 122.5542°W

Information
- School type: Independent
- Motto: Learning to live well, with others and for others, in a just community.
- Established: 1985
- Headmaster: Scott Banack
- Grades: Junior Kindergarten to Grade 12
- Enrollment: 672 (September, 2021)
- Language: English
- Campus size: 27 Acres
- Area: British Columbia, Canada
- Colours: Navy Blue & Maroon
- Mascot: Gryph the Gryphon
- Team name: Gryphons
- Affiliations: Independent Schools Association of BC, Council of International Schools, International Baccalaureate Organization, Canadian Accreditation Independent Schools
- Website: www.meadowridge.bc.ca

Meadowridge School (also known as MDR), located in Maple Ridge, British Columbia, Canada, is a coeducational, independent school teaching Junior Kindergarten through to Grade 12.

Although consistently placing within the top three schools according to the Fraser Report, Meadowridge School Headmaster has publicly denounced the Fraser Report rankings. Meadowridge School received the 2014 Maple Ridge Chamber of Commerce Business of the Year Award.

== Campus ==
Meadowridge School is on 27 acres of land in east Maple Ridge, British Columbia, Canada, approximately 45 minutes from Vancouver, BC. The Meadowridge Campus consists of 125,000 square feet of indoor learning space as well as a variety of outdoor learning spaces.

Indoor and outdoor learning spaces include:

- Exploration forest with a creek, trails, and bridges
- Garden area with plots for students and staff to use for a variety of subjects
- Primary Years Greenhouse
- Senior Greenhouse outfitted with variable lighting, watering system, and temperature control
- Beehives
- Two main playgrounds and one fenced playground
- Two playing fields, including a lighted Olympic sized soccer pitch
- Rubberized starting track
- Shot-Put pit
- Long-jump pit
- Library with over 40,000 resources
- Double gymnasium
- Indoor bouldering wall
- Two music rooms
- Two art rooms, one with a kiln
- Fitness facility
- More than Five science laboratories
- Design Lab with a 3D printer, laser engraver, multiple carpentry tools, and robotics kits
- Purposely built Early Learning Centre for Kindergarten and Junior Kindergarten

The creek on Meadowridge land is Latimer Creek, which the school has worked at restoring to its natural space and encouraging growth of indigenous plants and animals. With help from local agencies the Alouette River Management Society, Kanaka Education and Environmental Partnership, and the South Coast Conservation Program students and staff removed invasive plants, created a special frog pond habitat to support the endangered red-legged-frogs found in the area, and planted indigenous plants like Douglas Fir, big leaf maple, and red elderberry.

== Academics ==
Meadowridge School abides by the British Columbia Ministry of Education curriculum while offering the International Baccalaureate program at all grade levels. The International Baccalaureate focuses "on teaching students to think critically and independently, and how to inquire with care and logic".

Meadowridge was first authorized for the Primary Years Programme (Junior Kindergarten to Grade 5) on February 19, 2007. The Middle Years Programme (Grade 6 to Grade 10) authorization happened shortly after on March 6, 2007. The Diploma Program (Grade 11 and 12) was authorized on March 1, 2012.

As of August 2019 the Diploma Course offerings for students are:

- Biology: SL & HL
- Chemistry: SL & HL
- Physics: SL & HL
- Language & Literature: SL & HL
- French: SL & HL
- Spanish: SL, HL, & Ab-Initio
- Business Management: SL & HL
- History: SL & HL
- Human Geography: SL & HL
- Math Analysis and Approaches: SL & HL
- Visual Arts: SL & HL
- Music: SL & HL

The first IB Diploma Program Cohort graduated in 2014.

== University acceptances ==
Meadowridge School frequently places its graduates in post-secondary institutions in Canada, the United States, and United Kingdom. The Class of 2017 had 4.5 acceptance offers per student with 100% of applicants receiving offers from a post-secondary institution.

== Athletics ==
Meadowridge offers a variety of athletic teams and clubs. Athletics clubs are offered for students in Kindergarten to Grade 12 and athletic teams are offered for students in Grade 4 to Grade 12. Meadowridge offers one of the largest fencing clubs in British Columbia and hosts an annual tournament that draws players from all over British Columbia and the northwest United States.

Meadowridge has earned provincial titles in Soccer, Water-Polo, Basketball, Volleyball, and Track & Field.

Athletic Teams & Clubs Offered:

- Soccer
- Basketball
- Volleyball
- Cross Country
- Swimming
- Track & Field
- Badminton
- Golf
- Fencing
- Fitness Club
- Running Club

Athletic Leagues:

- Independent Schools Association (ISA)
- Independent Schools Elementary Association (ISEA)
- Greater Vancouver Independent Schools Athletics Association (GVISAA)
- Fraser Valley Secondary Schools Athletics Association (FVSSAA)
- Maple Ridge Pitt Meadows Secondary Schools Athletics Association (MRPMSSAA)
- British Columbia School Sports (BCSS)

== Student life ==
All students at Meadowridge are supported in the attainment of the Duke of Edinburgh Award. Students in Grade 9 and 10 participate in the adventurous journey component of the award through the Outdoor Education Program. They optionally complete the other three components: service, skill development, and community service.

== House system ==
Meadowridge School is made up of four houses: Alouette (Blue), Kanaka (Red), Fraser (Green), and Whonnock (Orange). Each student, parent, and staff member belongs to one house. Competitions are held throughout the year for house points with two major Spirit Days happening at the beginning and end of the year. During Spirit Day, the four teams will compete against one another in various physical activities where house points are awarded for both success within the activities, as well as sportsmanship and house spirit. The day begins with the groups performing "house cheers", which are typically parodies of popular songs with added actions.

Previously, each house had a mascot character: Alouette an Alligator, Kanaka a Kodiak, Fraser a Falcon, and Whonnock a dragon. However, these were phased out for a variety of reasons.

The House with the most house points wins the House Cup at the end of the school year.

== Community service ==
Community service and outreach supports a number of local and international organizations including Cops for Cancer, Covenant House Vancouver, Matthew's House, Florida Wild Horse Rescue, ME to WE, BC Children's Hospital, Friends in Need Food Bank and the Terry Fox Foundation.

Students organize and manage a number of events, volunteer projects, and fundraisers throughout the year including a benefit concert, food hamper sorting, movie night, and awareness campaigns.

Meadowridge School students have written cards and letters of thanks that are "then delivered to local retirement communities and veterans" as part of a school-wide week of remembrance in November. In 2020 over 350 students sent out postcards, drawings, and letters.

== Clubs and activities ==
Meadowridge offers a wide variety of extra-curricular clubs:

- Art
- Business Club
- Camping Skills
- Chess
- Colouring & Meditation
- Governance & Civic Mirror
- Model United Nations
- Silver-Smithing
- Teaching Drawing Skills
- Appreciation & Gratitude Writing
- Garden Club
- Global Citizenship Club
- FIRST LEGO League Robotics
- Student-Initiated Service
- Yearbook
- Basketball Skills
- Fitness Club
- Girls Basketball 8–10
- Girls Volleyball
- Junior Boys Basketball
- Martial Arts
- Running
- Table Tennis
- Track & Field
- Ultimate Frisbee
- Reading Link
- Ready to Lead
- Musical
- Tennis
- Soccer Skills
- Storytelling Spelling
- PYP Buddies
- Orienteering

== Notable people ==
Jan Elsted and Crispin Elsted founded Barbarian Press, a nationally awarded printing press company. They both retired from teaching at Meadowridge School to focus on Barbarian Press.

Greg Moore, Race Car Driver Alumni of Meadowridge School 1985 to 1991. Greg Moore and his family were one of the founding families of Meadowridge School. He attended Meadowridge until Grade 10, which was the highest grade available at the time. The Greg Moore Foundation funds a scholarship at Meadowridge School, awarded to a graduating student each year.

A banner hangs in the school gymnasium in Moore's honour.

The actress and ballet dancer Sophia Reid-Gantzert studied at Meadowridge.
