= Sydney Lee =

Sydney Lee may refer to:

- Sydney Lee (engraver) (1866–1949), British wood engraver
- Sydney Lee (snooker player) (1911–1986), English billiards and snooker player
- Sydney Smith Lee (1802–1869), American naval officer

== See also ==
- Sidney Lee (1859–1926), English biographer, writer and critic
