= Simon Brett (disambiguation) =

Simon Brett may refer to:

- Simon Brett (born 1945), British writer, producer, playwright
- Simon Baliol Brett (1943–2024), British artist, wood engraver, writer
