= Garrick Palmer =

English painter (1933–2023)

Garrick Salisbury Palmer (20 September 1933 – 9 July 2023) was an English painter, wood engraver, photographer and teacher. He studied at the Royal Academy Schools and taught at the Winchester School of Art, where he became head of the Foundation Department in 1966.

== Early life and education ==
Garrick Salisbury Palmer was born on 20 September 1933 in Portsmouth, England, where he would live for the rest of his life. From 1945 to 1949, he was educated at St. John's College, Southsea, followed by a National Diploma of Design in painting and engraving from the Portsmouth College of Art and Design. Studying postgraduate courses at the Royal Academy Schools, London, between 1955 and 1959, he was awarded David Murray Landscape Scholarships in 1955, 1956 and 1957, the Leverhulme Scholarship in 1957, and the Royal Academy Gold Medal and the Edward Scott Travelling Scholarship in 1958.

== Artist career ==
While still at the RA, Palmer began teaching part-time at Winchester School of Art, where he became a full-time tutor in 1962, and in 1966, the head of the Foundation Department.

In 1967, he received his first commission, from the Folio Society, to illustrate Three Stories by Herman Melville, which included Palmer's first full-page illustration to Benito Cereno of the head of Babo, the rebellious slave, on a pike in the market square. The Society commissioned him again in 1971 for The Destruction of the Jews, by Josephus, and in 1974 for Moby Dick, by Melville. Similarly the short-lived Imprint Society in Barre, Massachusetts, commissioned Palmer to illustrate H. M. Tomlinson's The Sea and The Jungle in 1971 and Benito Cereno, by Melville, in 1972. The motif of the head of Babo on a pole returned, reflecting changes in Palmer's artistic style. Palmer also illustrated Ship of Sounds, The Gruffyground Press, 1981 (130 copies), a poem by John Fuller.

Palmer retired from Winchester School of Art in December 1986, thereafter devoting himself full-time to his art. The Old Stile Press, in Llandogo, persuaded Palmer to return to his boxwood blocks to illustrate The Ballad of Reading Gaol, by Oscar Wilde, in 1994 (225 copies). In February of the same year, Palmer took part in a major examination of art created for Coleridge's Poem, The Rime of the Ancient Mariner. "The Mariner Imagined, Coleridge's Poem and the Artist, 1831-1994", held at Lauderdale House, Highgate Hill, London, also featured works by David Scott, Joseph Noel Paton, Gustave Doré, Willy Pogany, David Jones, Duncan Grant, Mervyn Peake and Patrick Procktor. The following November his work was shown in an "Exhibition of Wood Engravings used as Book Illustrations", at Oxford University Club, Halifax House, Oxford. His next participation was in the "Society of Wood Engravers Touring Exhibition", April 1995 - January 1996.

An exhibition at Garden Gallery, Pallant House, Chichester, West Sussex, to mark the forthcoming publication of "LAND", by the Old Stile Press, Llandogo, December 1995 (240 copies), featured landscape wood engraving in Palmer's "instantly recognizable style" and text by Eric Williams and soon sold out. Palmer featured in further exhibitions at the "LINE" Gallery, Linlithgow, Scotland in January 1996, and Twentieth Century Word Engineering, Exeter City Museums and Art Gallery, February 1997.

In November 2012, the Society of Wood Engravers awarded its 75th Anniversary Prize to Palmer for his chef d'oeuvre, "Circular Forms", which exists in several editions. He was a Fellow of the Royal Society of Painter-Printmakers (retired), the Society of Wood Engravers associate of the Royal Engravers, the Royal Society of Painter-Etchers and Engravers (retired), and the Royal Society of Painter-Printmakers (retired).

== Photography career ==
From the early 1980s he had a second career as a photographer. Beginning in 1983, he had numerous commissions and exhibitions, including: an exhibition of Orkney & Shetland in The Winchester Gallery, 1983; a grant from Southern Arts for a Portsmouth project in 1985; and a commission to produce photographs of sculptures in Hampshire for the newly formed Hampshire Sculpture Trust in January 1987, followed by its opening exhibition in May 1987 and an exhibition of the prints at the Winchester Gallery in July 1987.

In November 1987, the City of Portsmouth Museum and Art Gallery held an exhibition of his photographs, entitled "Portsmouth, A Personal Reflection", which moved to the Havant Museum and Gallery in July 1988. October 1990 saw an "Exhibition of Architectural Photographs" at the Spitfield Gallery, London. Palmer participated in "A Southern Eye" - Six Photographers, at the Winchester Contemporary Art Gallery in September 1996. In April 1997 he exhibited photographs of contemporary sculpture at the New Art Centre, Roche Court.

Hampshire County Council awarded Palmer a three-year grant in 1997 to photograph "Early Churches in Hampshire", a selection of photographs being shown at Winchester Cathedral in 1999. Other exhibitions include: photographs of historic churches and landscapes around the area of Butser shown at the Queen Elizabeth Country Park Centre in August and September 2001; "Photographs of Sculpture" at the Hampshire Sculpture Trust Gallery in Winchester, November–December 2002; "FOREST", an exhibition at the Winchester Gallery plus a Southern Arts Touring Exhibition 2002–2003; photographs at the Queen Elizabeth Country Park Centre in 2004. In February–March 2006, Palmer's show of church interiors, "Places of Worship", was held at Portsmouth Cathedral; in October–November 2006 "At Any Time" was shown at the Winchester Gallery.

In 2001 Palmer was commissioned to document the demolition of the site next to Pallant House and the building of the New Pallant House Gallery in Chichester, a project that he worked on until 2006. He has since photographed works by the young New Zealand artist Makoure Scott for Twenty-First Century Works, a limited edition publication, (Paul Holberton, 2006).

== Personal life and death ==
While a student at art college Palmer met the young Ellis Leach-Moore, like him a native of Portsmouth. Her study encompassed jewellery making and silversmithing. They married on 11 July 1959, and had three daughters. Ellis Palmer died of cancer in 1998.

Garrick Palmer died in Portsmouth on 9 July 2023, at the age of 89.

== Work in public collections ==
- Kennet Lock (1977) Tate Gallery
- Circular Forms No. 15 (1972) Reading Museum and Town Hall
- Lazarus Raised from the Dead (1961) Towner Gallery, Eastbourne
- Winchester Landscape, Southampton City Art Gallery

== Exhibitions – Paintings and engravings ==
Palmer has shown work at the following exhibitions:

- RAA Summer Exhibition in 1956/57/58/60
- Wildenstein Gallery, London, 1961
- Piccadilly Gallery, 1961
- Ashgate Gallery, Farnham, 1962 and 1967
- Reading Art Gallery (engravings only), 1964
- Ash Barn Gallery, Petersfield, 1965–66
- Southampton University, 1969-1976
- Atelier d'Art, Amsterdam, 1970
- Retrospective, Portsmouth Museum and Art Gallery, 1973
- Swansea University, Swansea, Wales, 1975
- "Five Artists", Southampton Art Gallery, 1975
- Yew Tree Gallery, Derbyshire, 1977
- Galerie Ismene, Pyrenees, France, 1978
- "Xylon - International Triennial Exhibition of Wood Engravings", Fribourg, Switzerland, 1979
- Portsmouth/Duisburg Exhibition, Portsmouth Museum and Art Gallery, 1980
- the "International Exhibition of Wood Engraving", Hereford Art Gallery, by invitation, 1984
- "Engraving Then and Now", the retrospective 50th exhibition of the Society of Wood Engravers, 1988
- Southern Arts Exhibition of contemporary wood engraving, 1989
- Artists Prints, Hill Court Gallery, Abergavenny, Wales, May 1994
