= Barbara Greg =

British artist (1900-1983)

- Born: 30 April 1900; Styal, Cheshire, England
- Died: 1983 (aged 82–83); Enfield, London
- Known for: Wood engraving, illustration
- Spouse: Norman Janes

Barbara Greg (30 April 1900 – 1983) was a British artist who illustrated a number of books.

== Biography ==
Greg was born in Styal in Cheshire and was educated at Bedales School. She studied at the Slade School of Art in London between 1919 and 1923 where she was taught by her future husband, the artist Norman Janes, whom she married in 1925. During this time she also took wood engraving classes at the Central School of Arts and Crafts and later, in 1926 and 1927, studied at the Westminster School of Art. Greg's interest in wood engraving as a technique may have resulted from seeing her grandfathers' collection of works by Thomas Bewick. She first exhibited a wood engraving in 1924 at the Society of Wood Engravers and continued to do so on a regular basis until 1976. Greg produced wood cut, or sometimes lino cut, designs for book dust jackets and endpapers, for calendars and also decorated piano rolls, often with musical subjects. She illustrated several books mostly with natural history or countryside themes and contributed illustrations to the magazine Country Life. Greg exhibited on a regular basis at the Royal Academy, with the New English Art Club, the Royal Society of Painter-Etchers and Engravers, the Royal Hibernian Academy and the Royal Watercolour Society. She was elected a member of the Manchester Academy of Fine Arts in 1925 and became an associate member of the Royal Society of Painter-Etchers and Engravers in 1940 and a full member in 1946. In 1952 she became a full member of the Society of Wood Engravers.

Greg lived in London and died in hospital at Enfield in north London in 1983.

== Books illustrated ==
Books illustrated by Greg;-

- A Fisherman's Log by GL Ashley Dodd, (Constable, 1929)
- Enigmas of Natural History by EL Grant Watson, (Cresset Press)
- More Enigmas of Natural History by EL Grant Watson, (Cresset Press, 1937)
- The Poachers Handbook by I Niall, (Heinemann, 1951)
- Fresh Woods by I Niall, (Heinemann, 1951)
- Pastures New by I Niall, (Heinemann, 1952)
- Letter to a Musical Boy by M. Bruxner (OUP, 1958)
