= Crispin Elsted =

Canadian poet and publisher

Crispin Elsted is a Canadian poet and publisher. He was born on May 31, 1947, to Dennis and Isabel Elsted. He is the co-founder, with his wife Jan Elsted, of the book-publishing company Barbarian Press. His poetry collection Climate and the Affections was a shortlisted finalist for the Governor General's Award for English-language poetry and the Gerald Lampert Award in 1996.

Elsted has performed as a Shakespearean actor in repertory theatres and has composed, arranged and performed jazz and classical music.

Both Crispin and Jan Elsted are teachers and have previously taught at Meadowridge School in Maple Ridge, British Columbia.
