= Sydney Lee (engraver) =

British wood engraver (1866–1949)

Sydney Lee RA (27 August 1866 – 31 October 1949) was a British wood engraver, active at the beginning of the twentieth century. He was a founder member of the Society of Wood Engravers (1920). He was also a painter in oils and a Royal Academician.

== Biography ==
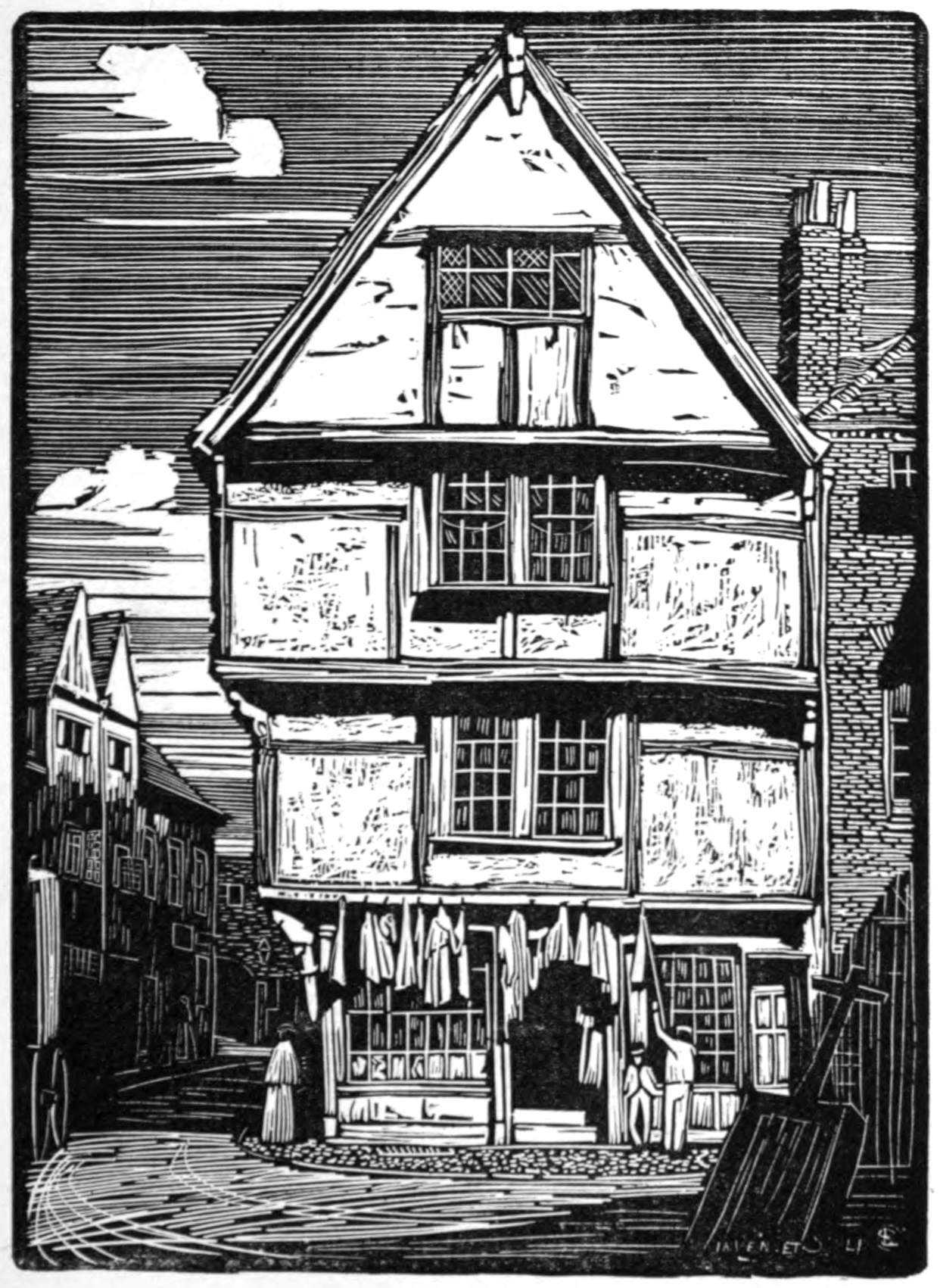
'The Gabled House', woodcut published in The Venture, 1903

Sydney Lee was born on 27 August 1866 in Manchester. He spent time in his father's mills, then enrolled at the Manchester School of Art, studying sculpture and relief modelling, and became interested in printmaking using metal and wood. He then studied under Walter Crane, who encouraged Lee's interest in Japanese prints. In 1892 Lee moved to London in 1893 and married Edith Mary Elgar; the couple had no children. After their extended honeymoon in Italy, Lee enrolled in 1894 at the Académie Colarossi in Paris.

In 1895 he and his wife settled in Holland Park Road, London. Lee exhibited his first painting at the Royal Academy of Arts in 1900 and frequently thereafter. From 1903 he exhibited at the New English Art Club, of which he was a member from 1906 to 1920. In 1905 he was elected an associate of the Royal Society of Painter-Etchers and Engravers, becoming a fellow in 1915. Lee was also an active member of the Society of Graver-Printers in Colour. From 1906 he taught wood-engraving at the Central School of Arts and Crafts in London.

After the First World War Lee helped establish the Society of Wood Engravers, founded in 1920. He was elected an Associate of the Royal Academy in 1922, and a full Royal Academician in 1930. He served as the Academy's treasurer from 1932 to 1940. In an election for the Society's president in December 1938 he was defeated by a narrow majority of two votes in favour of the architect Edwin Lutyens. In 1934 Lee became a member of the Council of Art and Industry.

He died in London on 31 October 1949, his widow Edith died in 1952.

In 2013 an exhibition, From the Shadows: The Prints of Sydney Lee RA, was held in London at the Royal Academy of Arts from 27 February to 26 May.

== Wood engravings and other work ==
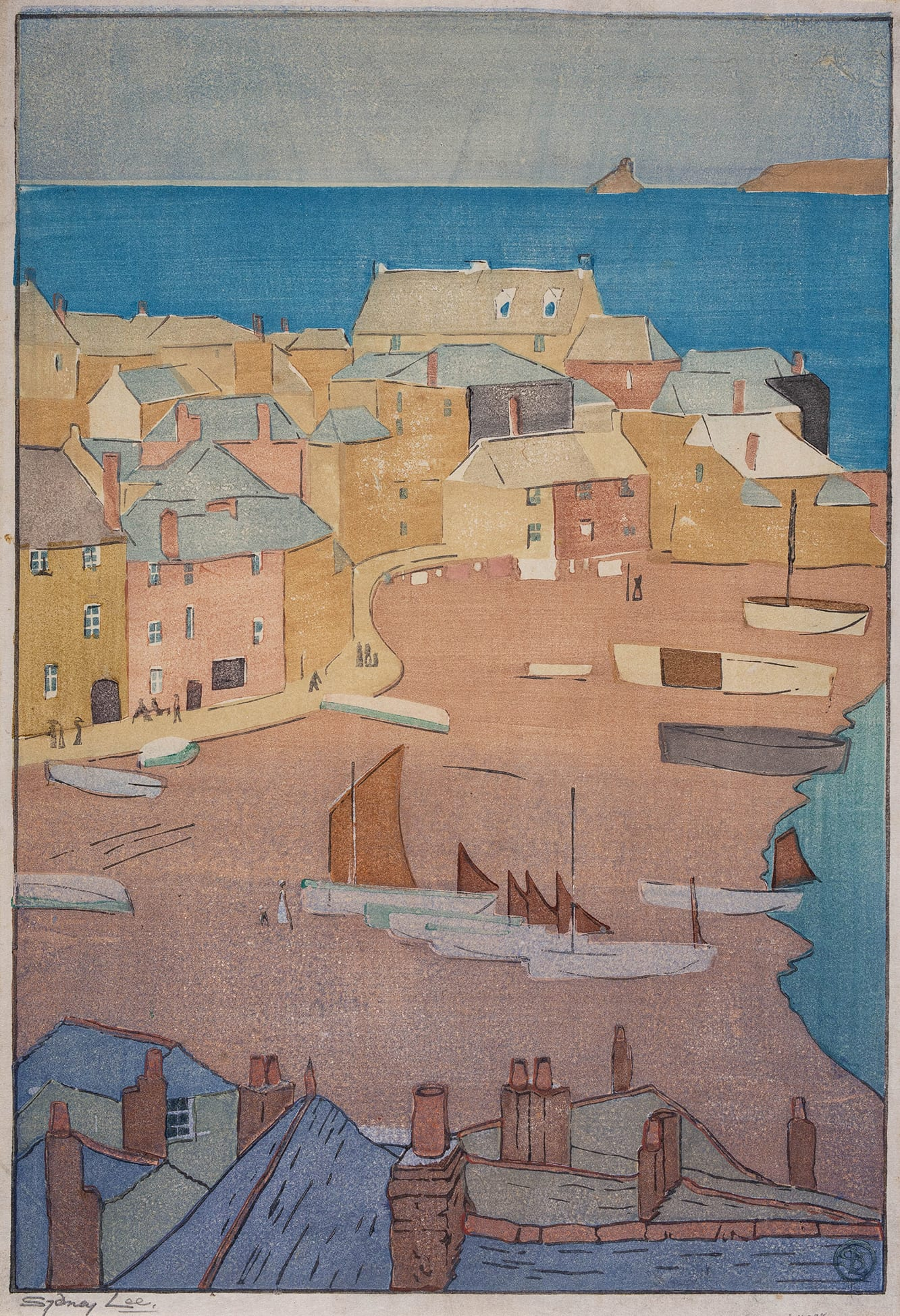
St Ives Harbour (circa 1905-1910), Lee's woodcut, printed in colours

Lee was a versatile artist in a wide range of media, oils, wood engraving and the woodcut, as well as etching, drypoint, aquatint, mezzotint and lithography. His work was popular during his lifetime, but lapsed into obscurity since his death.

Lee was a founder member of the Society of Wood Engravers in 1920, and exhibited with them from 1920 to 1923. Along with Edward Gordon Craig and Lucien Pissarro he was one of the elder statesmen of wood engraving. They, however, were exponents of black line engraving, whereas he was an exponent of the modern white line engraving promoted by Noel Rooke. Salaman states that Lee had already started to produce white line wood engravings in 1900, which makes him one of the earliest wood engravers to do so.

His wood engravings, largely traditional in approach, featured scenes and buildings, and appeared regularly in the Studio Magazine. The October 1915 issue had an article on him which featured The Limestone Rock (1904–1906), one of the largest wood engravings ever produced (230 mm × 295 mm (9.1 in × 11.6 in)).

In 1922 he contributed a wood engraving to Contemporary English Woodcuts, an anthology of wood engravings produced by Thomas Balston, a director at Duckworth and an enthusiast for the new style of wood engravings. Campbell Dodgson, Keeper of Prints and Drawings at the British Museum, wrote about him in his introduction to the book: "Mr. Sydney Lee, the senior of the contributors to this volume, is, I think, the only artist of the group who has used this method [i.e. the Japanese ukiyo-e method] as well as the European process".

Lee produced colour woodcuts in the ukiyo-e manner as well as white line wood engravings. Salaman states: "But while Mr. Lee is loyal to the hard box-wood and graver for his black-and-white expression upon the block, he has yielded for colour to the lure of the softer woods—the cherry and the pear—and, in the manner of the Japanese, has taken knife in hand and cut designs of a broad simplicity appropriate to the colour-print. He, indeed, was one of the first to follow Mr. Morley Fletcher's lead in this direction." At the Central School of Art and Crafts he taught classes on how to produce colour woodcuts in the ukiyo-e manner from 1906 to 1910.

Lee also worked in oils.

There are a number of examples of his work in public collections, included the Tate Gallery, the Ashmolean, the Royal Academy, the British Museum and the Victoria and Albert Museum.
