= Peter Sharpe (cricketer) =

English cricketer (1944–2025)

Personal information
- Full name: Peter James Sharpe
- Born: 4 April 1944; Denver, Norfolk, England
- Died: 19 April 2025 (aged 81)

Domestic team information
- Years: Team
- 1963–1965: Norfolk

Career statistics
Competition	List A
Matches	1
Runs scored	0
Batting average	0.00
100s/50s	–/–
Top score	0
Balls bowled	78
Wickets	1
Bowling average	38.00
5 wickets in innings	–
10 wickets in match	–
Best bowling	1/38
Catches/stumpings	–/–
- Source: Cricinfo, 2 July 2011

Peter James Sharpe (4 April 1944 – 19 April 2025) was an English cricketer. Sharpe's batting and bowling styles are unknown. He was born in Denver, Norfolk.

Sharpe made his debut for Norfolk in the 1963 Minor Counties Championship against Lincolnshire. Sharpe played Minor counties cricket for Norfolk from 1963 to 1965, which included 22 Minor Counties Championship matches. He made his only List A appearance against Hampshire in the 1965 Gillette Cup. In this match, he took the wicket of Danny Livingstone for the cost of 38 runs from 13 overs. With the bat, he dismissed for a duck by Peter Sainsbury.
