= Simon Baliol Brett =

British engraver (1943–2024)

Simon Brett
- Born: May 27, 1943; Windsor, England
- Died: December 29, 2024 (aged 81); Marlborough, England
- Occupation(s): Artist, engraver, writer
- Style: Wood engraving
- Spouse: Juliet Wood (m. 1974)

Simon Baliol Brett (27 May 1943 – 29 December 2024) was a British artist known for his work in wood engraving. He created more than 1,000 engravings for over sixty books, including works for The Folio Society, fine press books, bookplates and independent work. His personal subject matter included politics, philosophy, human form, war, ethics and religion. Brett’s work is held in the British Museum and the Victoria and Albert Museum.

Brett led the revival of wood engraving as a fine art form in the 1980s, collaborating closely with Hilary Paynter. As Chair of the Society of Wood Engravers from 1986–1992, he worked to fulfill the Society’s objective of promoting wood engraving. He curated two major exhibitions for the Society, Engraving Then and Now (1987) and Wood Engraving Here and Now (1995–1996).

== Early life and education ==
Brett was born in Windsor, England. His father, Antony Brett, served as the last steward of St Bartholomew's Hospital (Barts), which entailed living within the hospital in a flat reached by the William Hogarth Stair in the North Wing. Brett was educated at Ampleforth College, where he was taught art by sculptor John Bunting and introduced to the work of Eric Gill and David Jones. He later studied painting at Saint Martin's School of Art, London (1960–1964), where he also learned wood engraving from Clifford Webb.

== Career ==
From 1965 to 1970, Brett worked as a painter and printmaker. For two years, he lived in Taos, New Mexico near his great-aunt, painter Dorothy Brett, receiving grant support from the Helene Wurlitzer Foundation. He then travelled and worked in Denmark and Provence.

From 1971 to 1989, Brett taught drawing and printmaking at Marlborough College and lectured on art appreciation. During this time, he stopped painting to engrave full-time. In 1981, he won the Francis Williams Illustration Award for The Animals of Saint Gregory. In 1989, he took on a large commission illustrating the Reader's Digest Bible, which enabled him to stop teaching and work independently as a wood engraver.

Brett illustrated books for The Folio Society, including Byron, Keats, Shelley, Clarissa, Jane Eyre, The Confessions of Saint Augustine, Middlemarch, and The Meditations of Marcus Aurelius.

With Barbarian Press of British Columbia, Brett co-produced a fine print edition of Shakespeare’s Pericles, Prince of Tyre which aimed to ‘stage the play on the page’ using 98 images on over 140 blocks. Pericles won first prize for the “Limited Editions” in the 2011 Alcuin Society Awards for Excellence in Book Design and the “Judges Award” for the 2011 Oxford Fine Press Book Fair. The book also received praise at the 2011 CODEX International Book Fair in Berkeley.

In 1998, Brett was commissioned by the Queen's Medical Household to create a print commemorating the Golden Wedding Anniversary of Queen Elizabeth II and Prince Philip.

== Publications ==
Brett wrote six books and published numerous essays and reviews on the history, practice and condition of wood engraving, including regular contributions to the Society of Wood Engravers newsletter Multiples, and the journals Parenthesis, the journal of the Fine Press Book Association, and Printmaking Today, for which he was a member of the editorial board as well as a contributor.

His notable books include:

- Brett, S. (1987). Engravers: A Handbook for the Nineties. Cambridge: Silent Books. ISBN 978-1-85183-003-9
- Brett, S. (1992). Engravers Two: A Handbook Compiled for the Society of Wood Engravers. Cambridge: Silent Books. ISBN 978-1-85183-038-1
- Brett, S. (1994). Wood Engraving - How To Do It (1st ed.). Silent Books. ISBN 978-1-85183-045-9

———. (2000). Wood Engraving - How To Do It (2nd ed.). Primrose Hill Press. ISBN 978-1-901648-23-2
———. (2010). Wood Engraving - How To Do It (3rd revised ed.). A & C Black. ISBN 978-1-4081-2726-1
———. (2018). Wood Engraving - How To Do It (3rd reissued ed.). Herbert Press. ISBN 978-1-912217-50-2

- Brett, S. (2013). An Engraver’s Progress: Simon Brett, Fifty Years of Wood Engraving. London: Oblong Creative. ISBN 978-0-9575992-0-8
- Brett, S. (2019). The Life and Art of Clifford Webb. Dorset: Little Toller Books. ISBN 978-1-908213-66-2
- Brett, S. (2002). An Engraver’s Globe: Wood Engraving World-Wide in the Twenty-First Century. London: Primrose Hill Press. ISBN 978-1-901648-12-6

Published works about Simon Brett include:

- Pery, J. (2009). A Being More Intense: The Art of Six Wood Engravers. Oblong Creative Ltd. ISBN 978-0-9556576-1-0

This book was written by Jenny Pery for the occasion of the twenty-fifth anniversary of re-foundation of the Society of Wood Engravers in 1983.

- Barbarian Press (2013). Endgrain Editions Four: Simon Brett – An Engraver’s Progress. Mission, BC: Barbarian Press.

Barbarian Press devoted the fourth of their Endgrain Editions monographs to Brett’s work, with over a hundred engravings printed directly from the original blocks.

== Exhibitions ==
Brett’s work featured in exhibitions by the Society of Wood Engravers, the Royal Society of Painter-Printmakers, and the Royal Academy of Arts. For the Society of Wood Engravers, he curated two major exhibitions, Engraving Then and Now (1987) and Wood Engraving Here and Now (1995–96), and for the British Council, Out of the Wood, (1991). He had 13 solo exhibitions and at least 30 shared or mixed exhibitions. In 2013, his retrospective, An Engraver's Progress: Simon Brett, Fifty Years of Wood Engraving, was held at the Bankside Gallery, London.
