= Wood engraving =

Printmaking technique

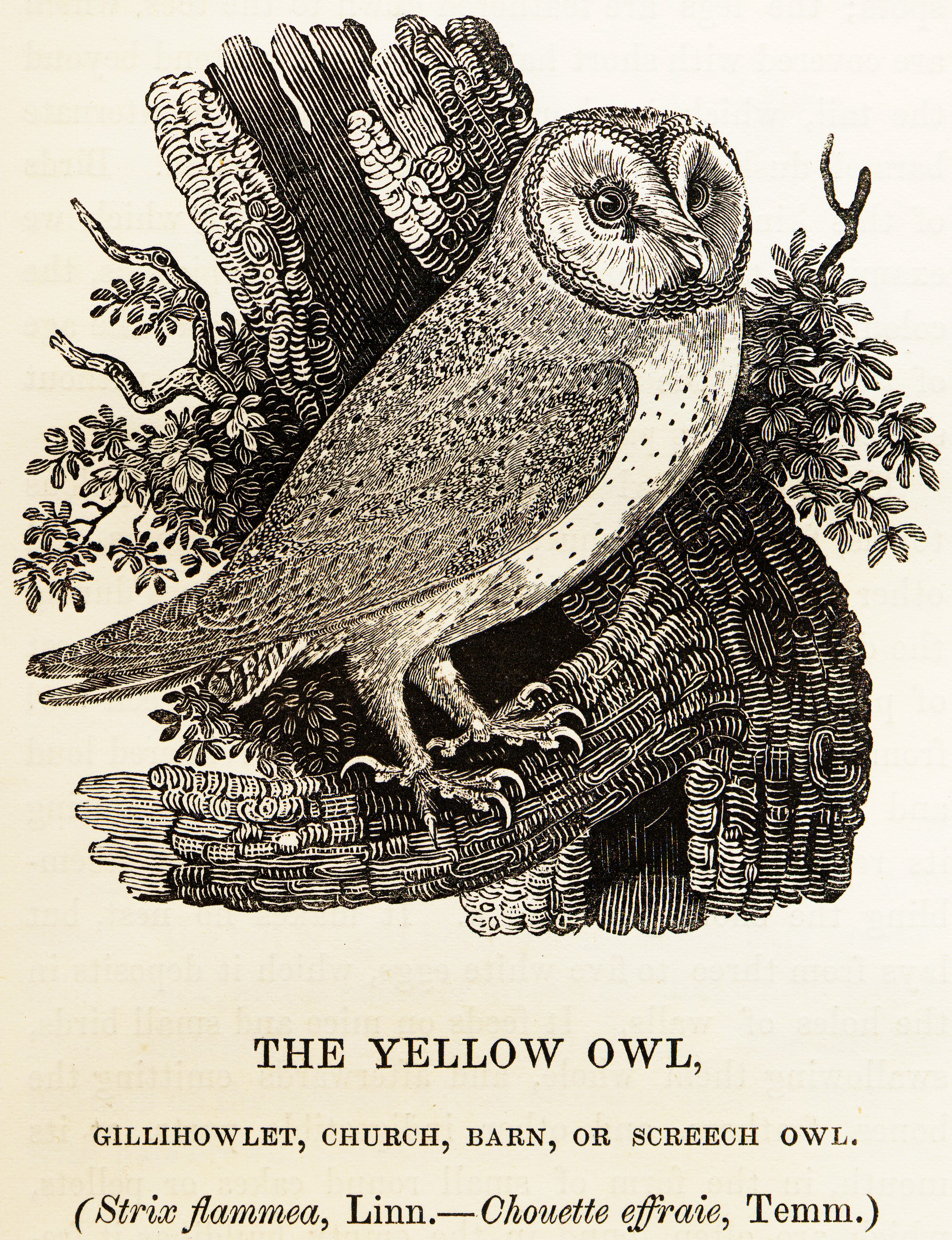
Thomas Bewick. Barn Owl (Tyto alba) in History of British Birds. 1797–1804.

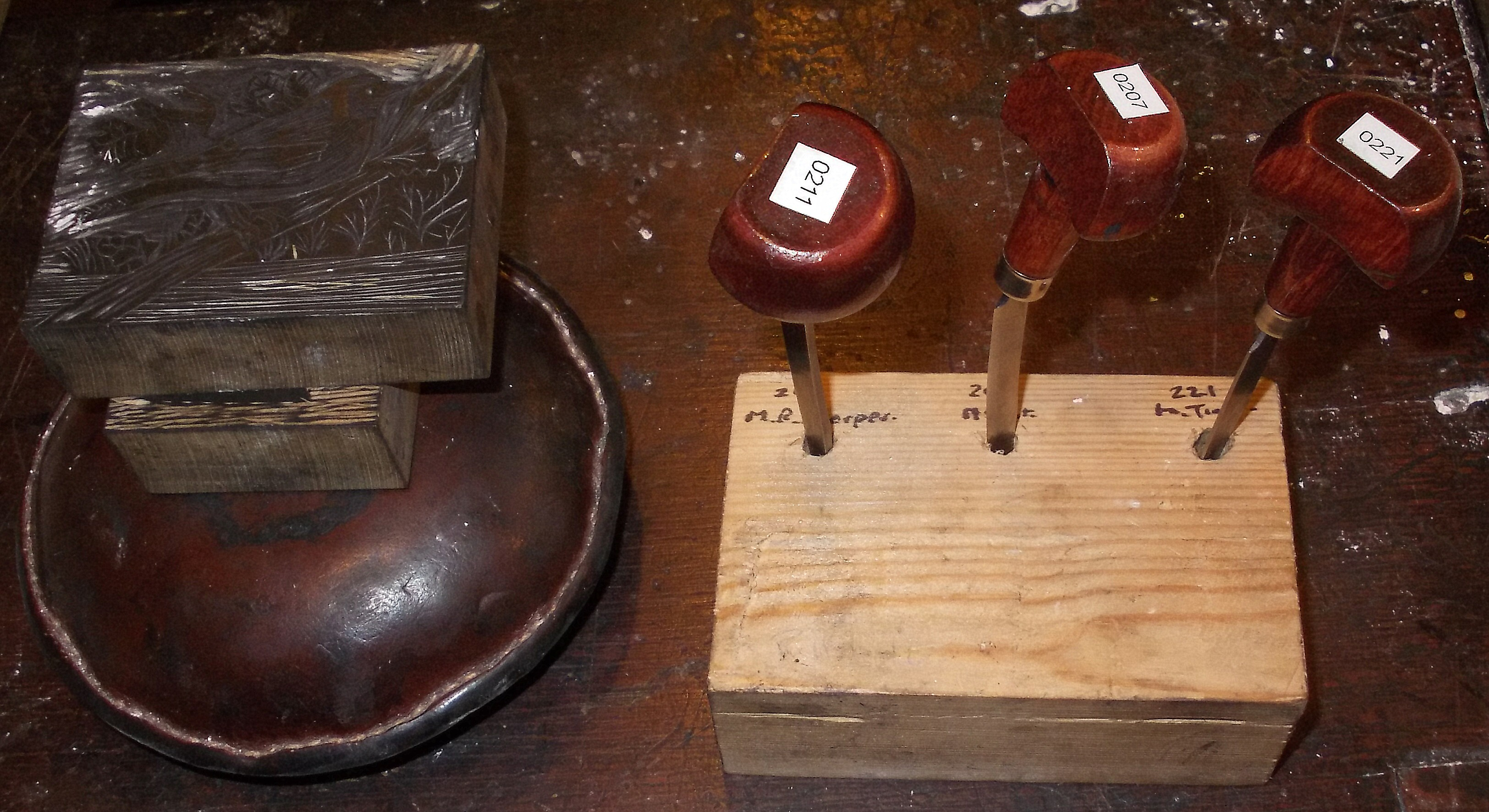
Leather-covered sandbag, wood blocks and tools (burins), used in wood engraving

Wood engraving is a printmaking technique, in which an artist works an image into a block of wood. Functionally a variety of woodcut, it uses relief printing, where the artist applies ink to the face of the block and prints using relatively low pressure. The areas of the design that show ink when printed are those left uncut on the surface of the wood block. By contrast, ordinary engraving, like etching, uses a metal plate for the matrix and is printed by the intaglio method, where the ink fills the valleys, the removed areas. As a result of the relatively lower pressure used to print, the blocks for wood engravings deteriorate less quickly than the copper plates of engravings, and may have a distinctive white-on-black character.

Thomas Bewick developed the wood engraving technique in Great Britain at the end of the 18th century. His work differed from earlier woodcuts in two key ways. First, rather than using woodcarving tools such as knives, Bewick used an engraver's burin (graver). With this, he could create thin delicate lines, often creating large dark areas in the composition. Second, wood engraving traditionally uses the wood's end grain—while the older technique used the softer side grain. The resulting increased hardness and durability facilitated more detailed images.

Wood-engraved blocks could be used on conventional printing presses, which were going through rapid mechanical improvements during the first quarter of the 19th century. The blocks were made the same height as, and composited alongside, movable type in page layouts—so printers could produce thousands of copies of illustrated pages with almost no deterioration. The combination of this new wood engraving method and mechanized printing drove a rapid expansion of illustrations in the 19th century. Further, advances in stereotype let wood-engravings be reproduced onto metal, where they could be mass-produced for sale to printers.

By the mid-19th century, many wood engravings rivaled copperplate engravings. Wood engraving was used to great effect by 19th-century artists such as Edward Calvert, and its heyday lasted until the early and mid-20th century when remarkable achievements were made by Eric Gill, Eric Ravilious, Tirzah Garwood and others. Though less used now, the technique is still prized in the early 21st century as a high-quality specialist technique of book illustration, and is promoted, for example, by the Society of Wood Engravers, who hold an annual exhibition in London and other British venues.

== Development of the term ==
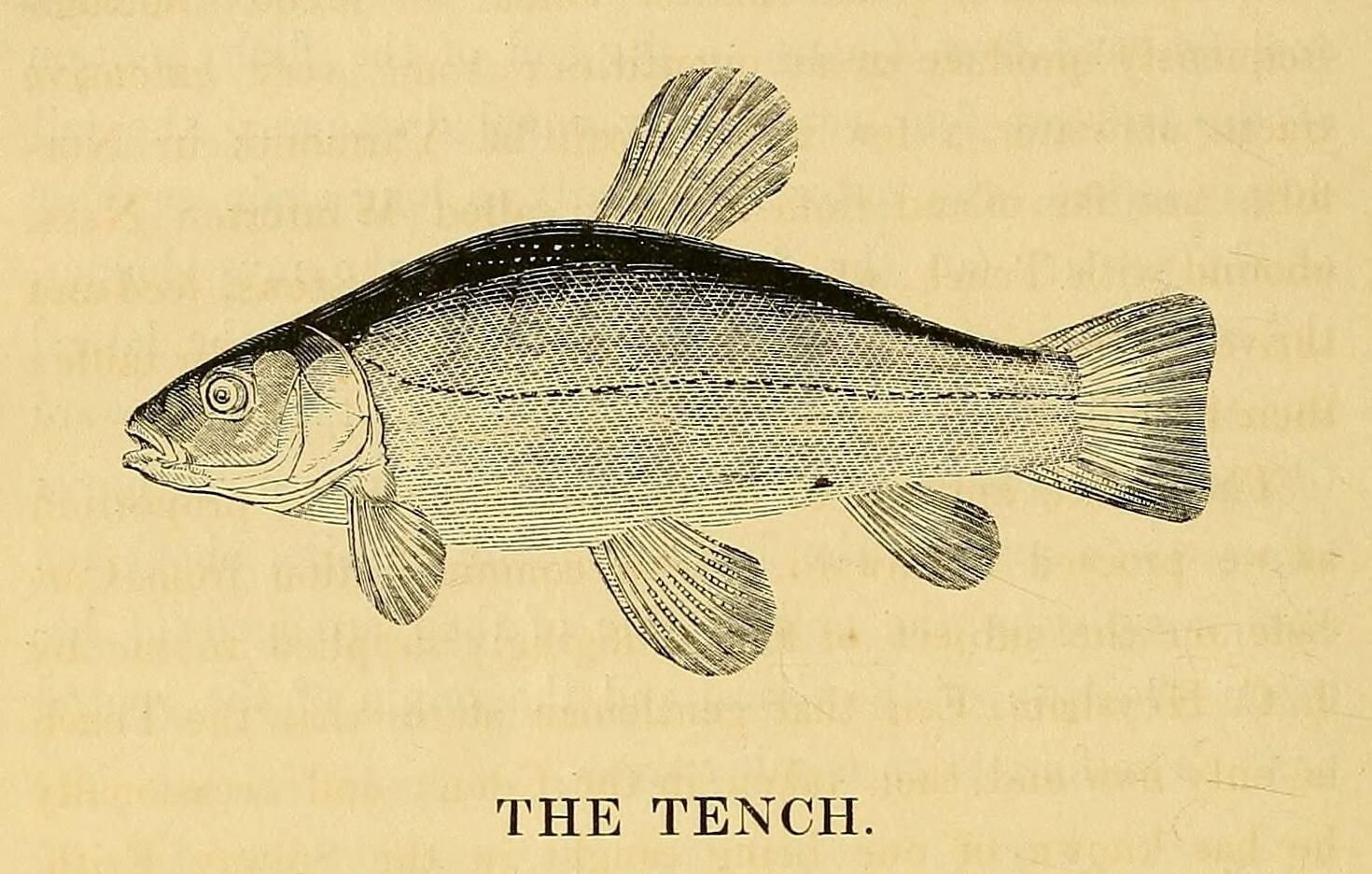
The Tench, A History of British Fishes (1835), by William Yarrell

The terms "woodcut" and "wood engraving" were used interchangeably in the early and middle part of the 19th century, until the modern distinction emerged towards the end of the century, with confusion often extending into the 20th century among non-specialists. At the start of the 19th, both "wood engraving" and "woodcut" were often used for both types, so that the title page of A History of British Fishes (1835), by William Yarrell boasts "illustrated by nearly 400 woodcuts", which in fact are all wood-engravings, from one of the classic works using the technique.

On the other hand, A Treatise on Wood Engraving, Historical and Practical (1839), by William Andrew Chatto, is almost all about woodcut and its much longer history, with Thomas Bewick only appearing from page 558. Chatto is ready to call individual woodcuts "cuts", but seems never to use "woodcut". Most of his illustrations are in fact wood engravings, by John Jackson, mostly reproducing woodcuts. Wood-engraving: A Manual of Instruction by William James Linton in 1884 and A History of Wood-engraving by George Edward Woodberry in 1883 are the same in their use of terms.

By the end of the century the modern distinction between the two terms for the two techniques was clear among specialists, with authoritative works like Campbell Dodgson's Catalogue of Early German and Flemish Woodcuts (in the British Museum, London, 1903) and eventually Arthur Mayger Hind's An Introduction to the History of Woodcut (1935). Both authors served as Keeper of prints and drawings at the British Museum.

== History ==
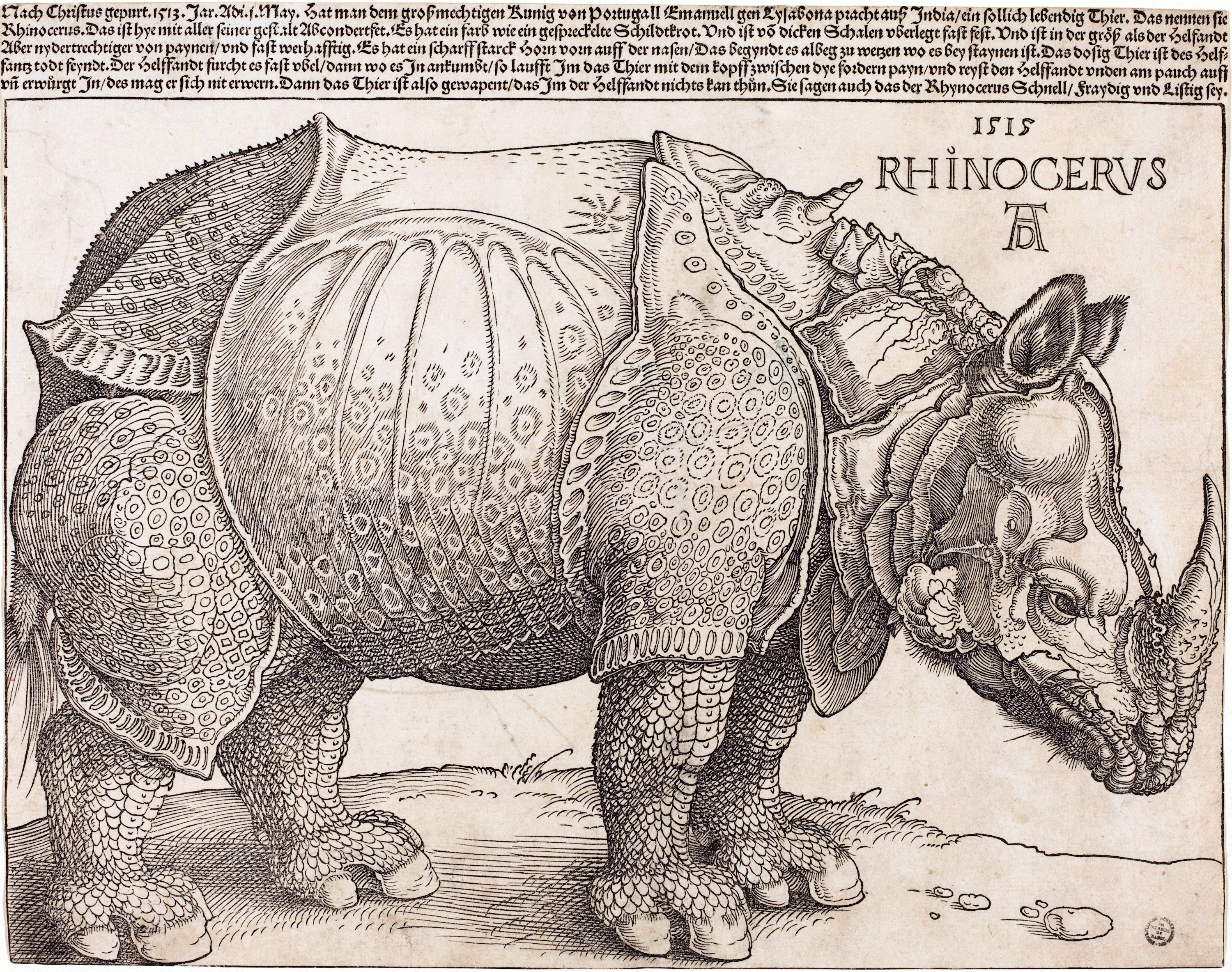
Example of a 16th-century woodcut, Dürer's Rhinoceros, by Albrecht Dürer, 1515

In 15th- and 16th-century Europe, woodcuts were a common technique in printmaking and printing, but their use as an artistic medium began to decline in the 17th century. They were still made for basic printing press work such as newspapers or almanacs. These required simple blocks which printed in relief with the text, rather than the elaborate intaglio forms in book illustrations and artistic printmaking at the time, in which type and illustrations were printed with separate plates.

The beginnings of modern wood engraving techniques developed in the late 17th century, by which time publishers of quality books only used the relief printing of wood blocks for small images in the text such as initials, taking advantage of relief printing blocks to be fitted into the same forme or set-up page as the letterpress type of the text. The Oxford University Press was using boxwood engraved on the end-grain for these by this time.

At the end of the 18th century the English artist and author Thomas Bewick is "usually considered the founder of wood-engraving" as "the first to realize its full potentialities" for larger illustrations. Bewick generally engraved harder woods than the woods used in woodcuts, and he engraved the ends of blocks instead of the side. Finding a woodcutting knife not suitable for working against the grain in harder woods, Bewick used a burin (or graver), an engraving tool with a V-shaped cutting tip. As Thomas Balston explains, Bewick abandoned the attempts of previous wood-engravers 'to imitate the black lines of copper engravings. Though not, as frequently asserted, the inventor of wood-engraving, he was the first to recognise that, as the incisions made by the graver on the wood block printed white, the right use of the medium was to base his designs as much as possible on white lines and areas, and so he became the first to use his graver as a drawing instrument and to employ the medium as an original art. From the beginning of the nineteenth century Bewick's techniques gradually came into wider use, especially in Britain and the United States.

Bewick's innovations also relied on the improved smoother papers developed in the 18th century. Without these the detail of his images would not have reproduced reliably.

Alexander Anderson introduced the technique to the United States. Bewick's work impressed him, so he reverse engineered and imitated Bewick's technique—using metal until he learned that Bewick used wood. There it was further expanded upon by his students, Joseph Alexander Adams.

=== Photographs into woodcuts ===
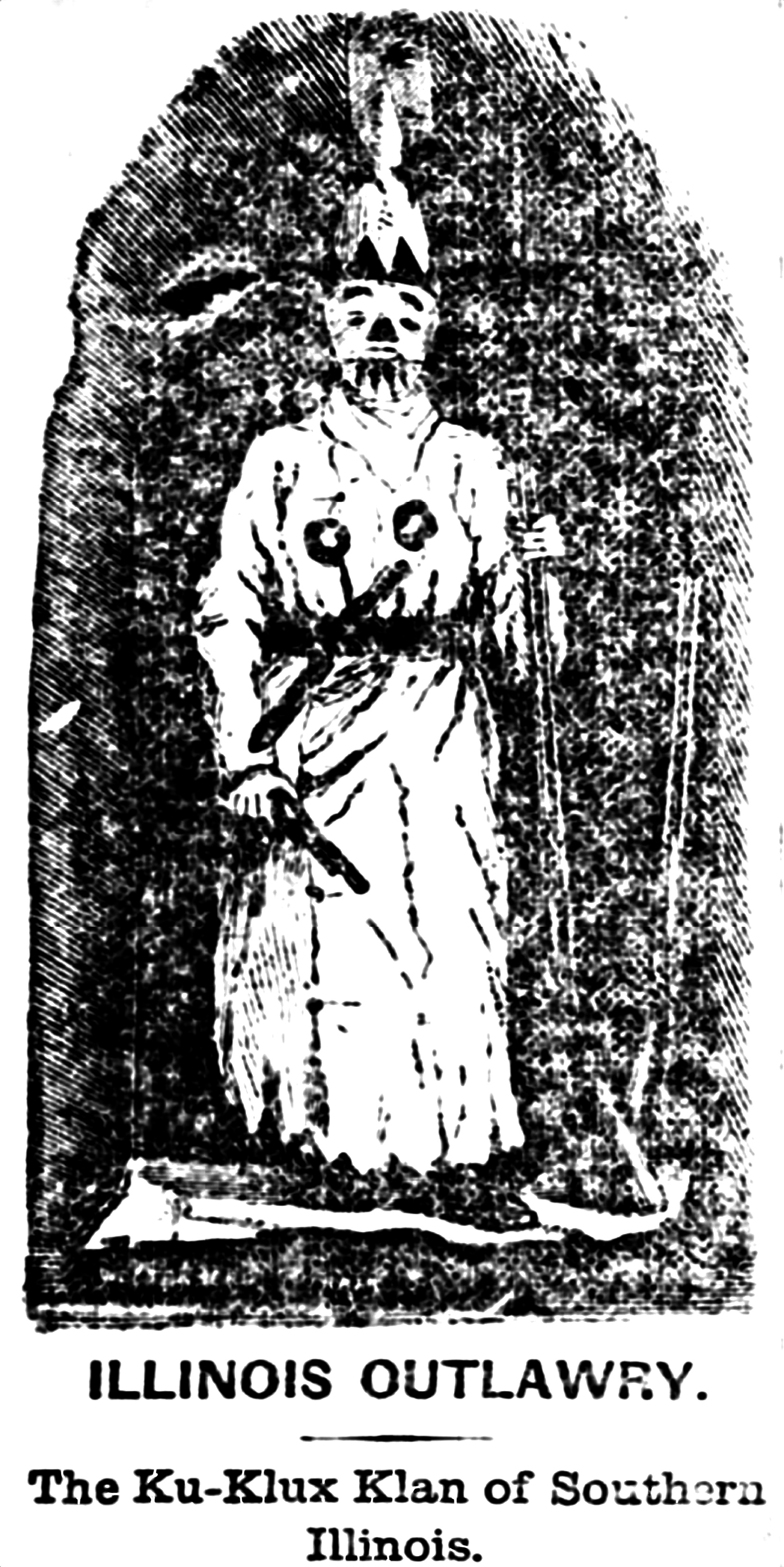
Garb and weapons of the Ku Klux Klan in Southern Illinois, August 1875, photo made into a wood engraving.

Before the advent of photolithography, newspapers used wood engravings to make photographic reproductions. An artist "meticulously traced the photograph upon the surface of a block of boxwood or other suitable tree, then used a sharp tool to cut out the troughs (the white part of the photo) from the wood. The remaining lines for the black ink stayed 'type high.' A workman rolled or daubed a layer of ink over the incised surface, laid a sheet of paper on it, pressed it down with a roller, pulled the paper away from the sticky substance," and the result was a printed image.

=== Growth of illustrated publications ===
Besides interpreting details of light and shade, from the 1820s onwards, engravers used the method to reproduce freehand line drawings. This was, in many ways an unnatural application, since engravers had to cut away almost all the surface of the block to produce the printable lines of the artist's drawing. Nonetheless, it became the most common use of wood engraving.

Examples include the cartoons of Punch magazine, the pictures in the Illustrated London News and Sir John Tenniel's illustrations to Lewis Carroll's works, the latter engraved by the firm of Dalziel Brothers. In the United States, wood-engraved publications also began to take hold, such as Harper's Weekly.

Frank Leslie, a British-born engraver who had headed the engraving department of the Illustrated London News, immigrated to the United States in 1848, where he developed a means to divide the labour for making wood engravings. A single design was divided into a grid, and each engraver worked on a square. The blocks were then assembled into a single image. This process formed the basis for his Frank Leslie's Illustrated Newspaper, which competed with Harper's in illustrating scenes from the American Civil War.

=== New techniques and technologies ===
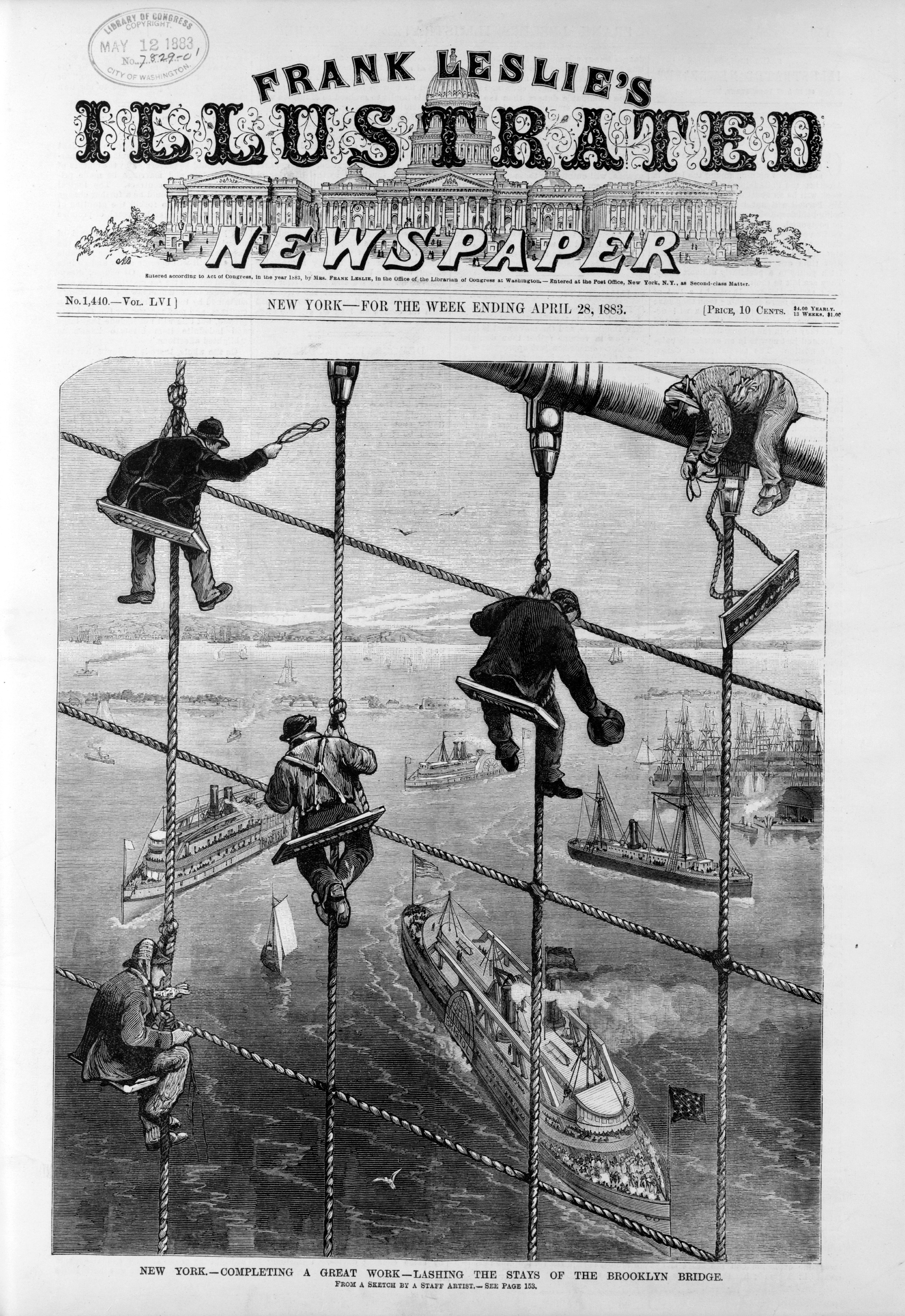
This is a large wood engraving on an 1883 cover of Frank Leslie's Illustrated Newspaper. Such images were composed of multiple component blocks, combined to form a single image, so as to divide the work among a number of engravers.

By the mid-19th century, electrotyping was developed, which could reproduce a wood engraving on metal. By this method, a single wood-engraving could be mass-produced for sale to printshops, and the original retained without wear. Before 1860, artists working for engraving had to paint or draw directly on the surface of the woodblock, or on paper which was then glued onto the block, and the original artwork was destroyed by the engraver cutting through it. In 1860, however, the engraver Thomas Bolton invented a process for transferring a photograph onto the block. Designs, normally on paper, could then be photographed and transferred to the block, or actual photographs used. This gradually became the standard technique.

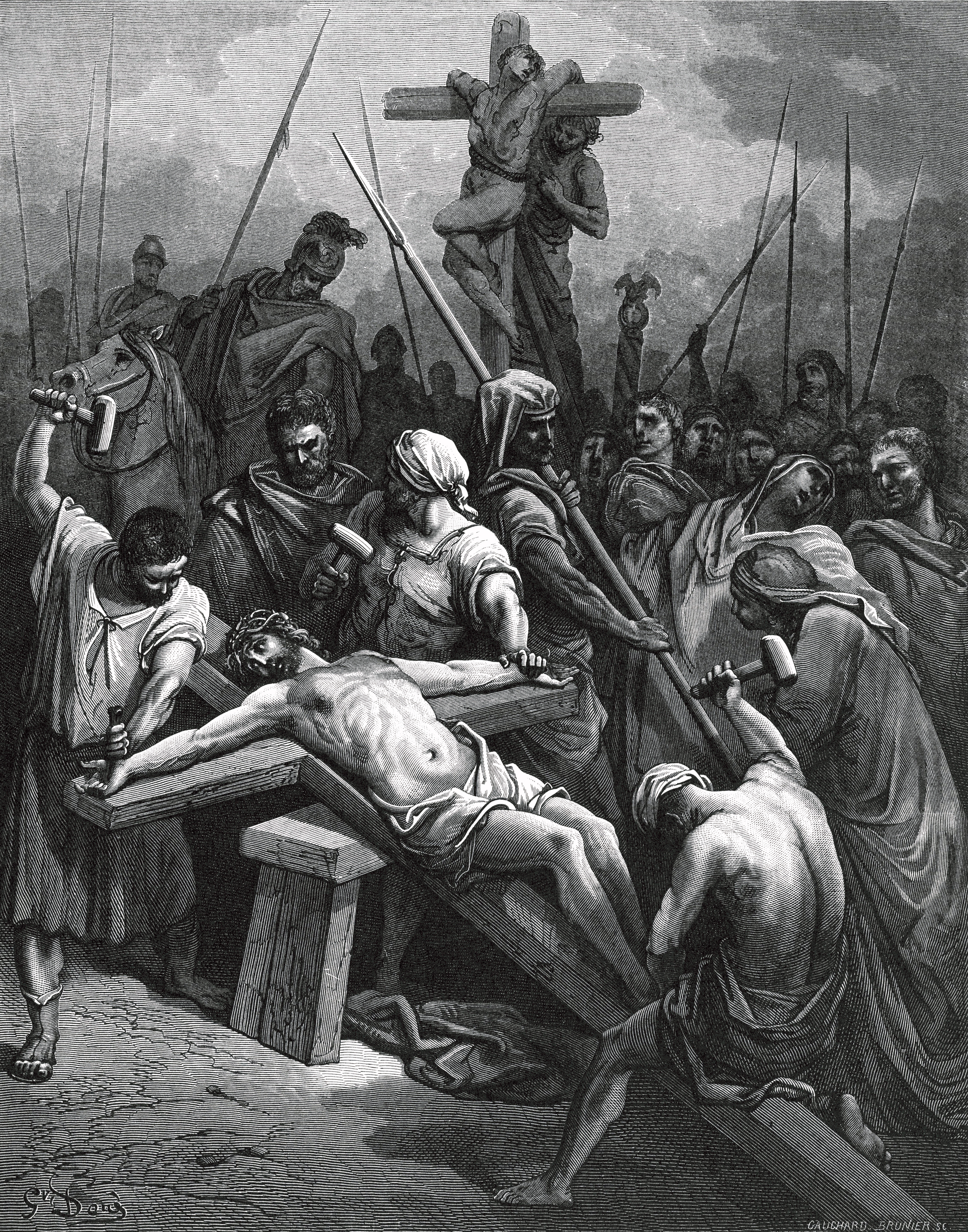
The modified technique in the wood-engraving Crucifixion of Jesus designed by Gustave Doré.

At about the same time, French engravers developed a modified technique (partly a return to that of Bewick) in which cross-hatching (one set of parallel lines crossing another at an angle) was almost eliminated. Instead, all tonal gradations were rendered by white lines of varying thickness and closeness, sometimes broken into dots for the darkest areas. This technique appears in wood-engravings after Gustave Doré.

Towards the end of the 19th century, a combination of Bolton's 'photo on wood' process and the increased technical virtuosity initiated by the French school gave wood engraving a new application as a means of reproducing drawings in water-colour wash (as opposed to line drawings) and actual photographs. This is exemplified in illustrations in The Strand Magazine during the 1890s. With the new century, improvements in the half-tone process rendered this kind of reproductive engraving obsolete. In a less sophisticated form, it survived in advertisements and trade catalogues until about 1930. With this change, wood engraving was left free to develop as a creative form in its own right, a movement prefigured in the late 1800s by such artists as Joseph Crawhall II and the Beggarstaff Brothers.

Timothy Cole was a traditional wood engraver, executing copies from museum paintings on commission from magazines such as The Century Magazine.

== Technique ==
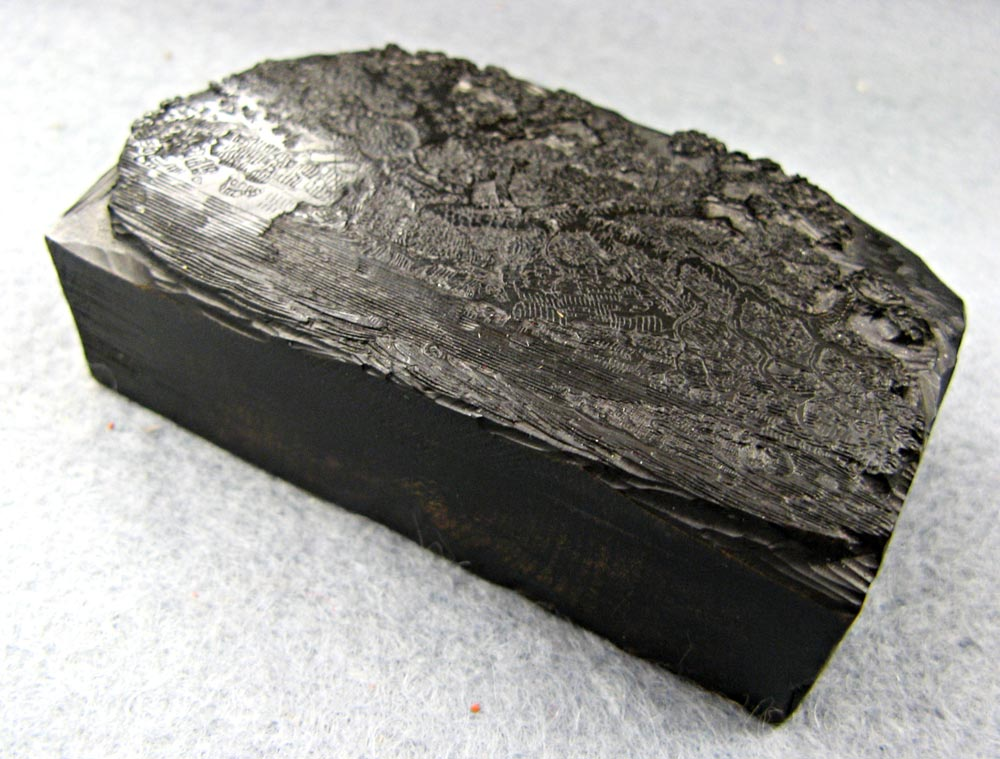
This original wood block by Thomas Bewick is made to type height so it could be used in a letterpress.

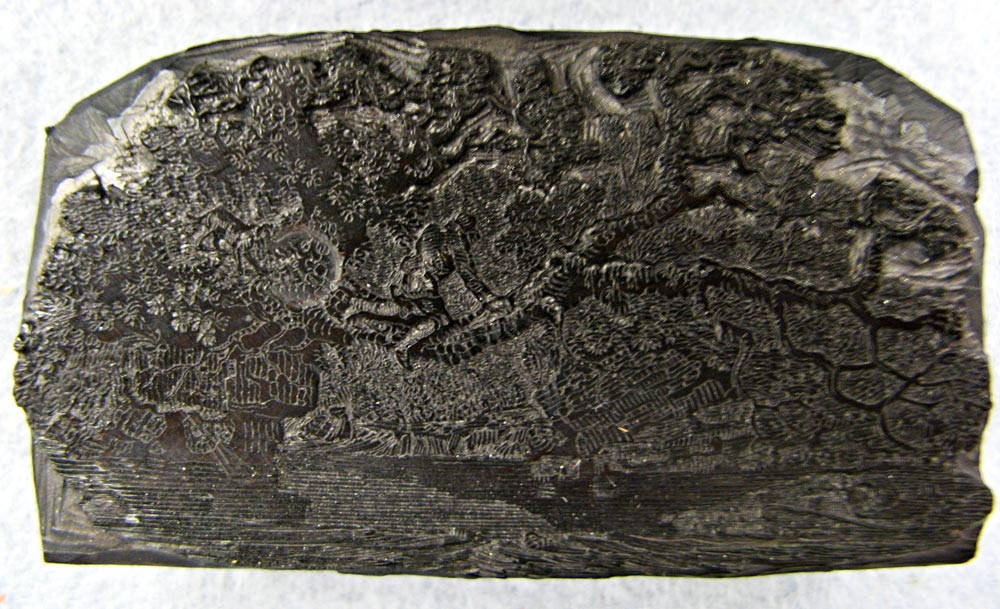
The block shown from above. Notice the circular area marking damaged and repaired wood on the left next to the figure of a man.

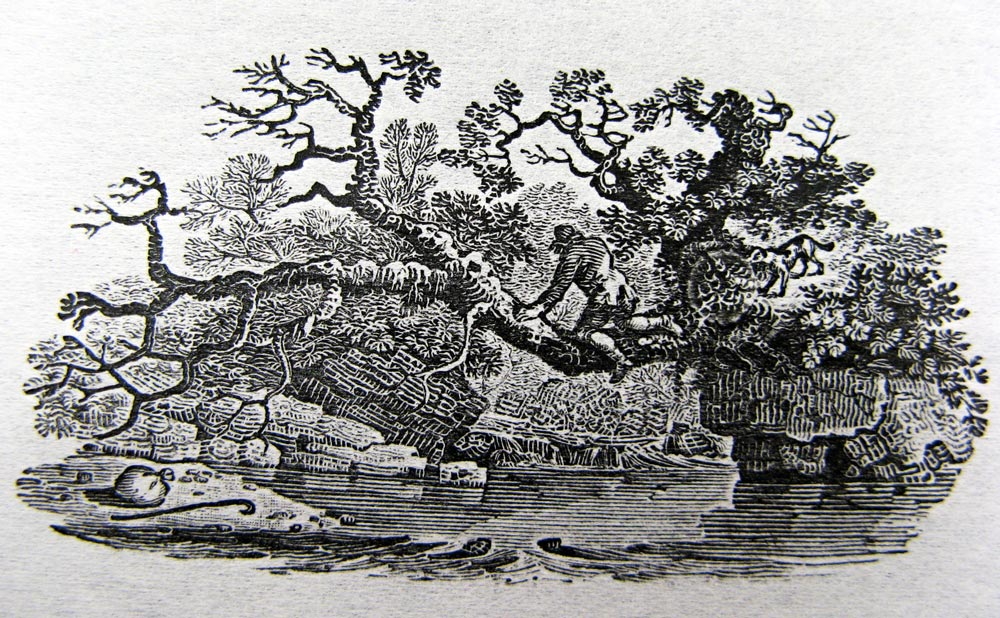
A print made from the block. The repaired circular area is visible on the right between the man and the dog.

Wood engraving blocks are typically made of boxwood or other hardwoods such as lemonwood or cherry. They are expensive to purchase because end-grain wood must be a section through the trunk or large bough of a tree. Some modern wood engravers use substitutes made of PVC or resin, mounted on MDF, which produce similarly detailed results of a slightly different character.

The block is manipulated on a "sandbag" (a sand-filled circular leather cushion). This helps the engraver produce curved or undulating lines with minimal manipulation of the cutting tool.

Wood engravers use a range of specialized tools. The lozenge graver is similar to the burin used by copper engravers of Bewick's day, and comes in different sizes. Various sizes of V-shaped graver are used for hatching. Other, more flexible, tools include the spitsticker, for fine undulating lines; the round scorper for curved textures; and the flat scorper for clearing larger areas.

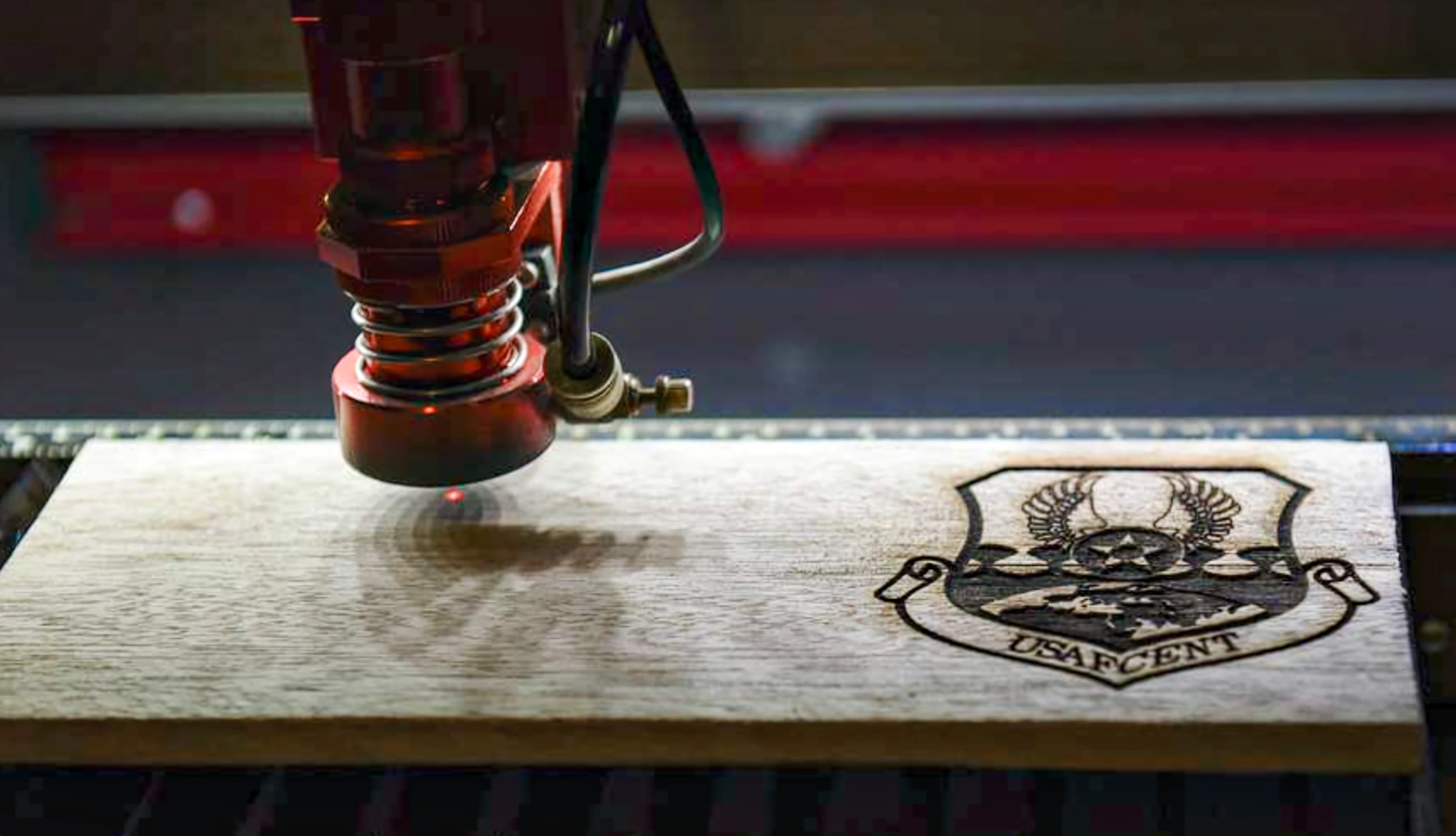
Laser engraved wood

Wood engraving is generally a black-and-white technique. However, a handful of wood engravers also work in colour, using three or four blocks of primary colours—in a way parallel to the four-colour process in modern printing. To do this, the printmaker must register the blocks (make sure they print in exactly the same place on the page). Recently, engravers have begun to use lasers to engrave wood.

== Notable wood engravers ==
- Joseph Alexander Adams
- Leonard Baskin
- Elisa Berroeta
- Thomas Bewick
- Torsten Billman
- James Bostock (painter)
- Edward Calvert
- Vija Celmins
- Asa Cheffetz
- Timothy Cole
- Arthur Comfort
- Rosemary Feit Covey
- Honoré Daumier
- Victor Delhez
- John DePol
- Stevan Dohanos
- Gustave Doré
- Nicolas Eekman
- Fritz Eichenberg
- Andy English
- M. C. Escher
- William Biscombe Gardner
- Tirzah Garwood
- Eric Gill
- Barbara Greg
- Gertrude Hermes
- Greta Hopkinson
- Barbara Howard
- Blair Hughes-Stanton
- Eduard Magnus Jakobson
- David Jones (poet)
- Rockwell Kent
- Paul Landacre
- Clare Leighton
- Frank Leslie
- William James Linton
- Iain Macnab
- Fortuné Méaulle
- Barry Moser
- Zdeněk Mézl
- John Nash
- Paul Nash
- Thomas Nast
- Agnes Miller Parker
- Garrick Palmer
- Hilary Paynter
- H.W. Peckwell
- Monica Poole
- Howard Pyle
- Eric Ravilious
- Gwen Raverat
- Don Rico
- Gaylord Schanilec
- Reynolds Stone
- John Thompson
- Leon Underwood
- Nora S. Unwin
- Félix Vallotton
- Manuel Vermeire
- Lynd Ward
- Richard Wagener
- Clifford Webb
- Alexander Weygers
- John Buckland Wright

== Gallery ==
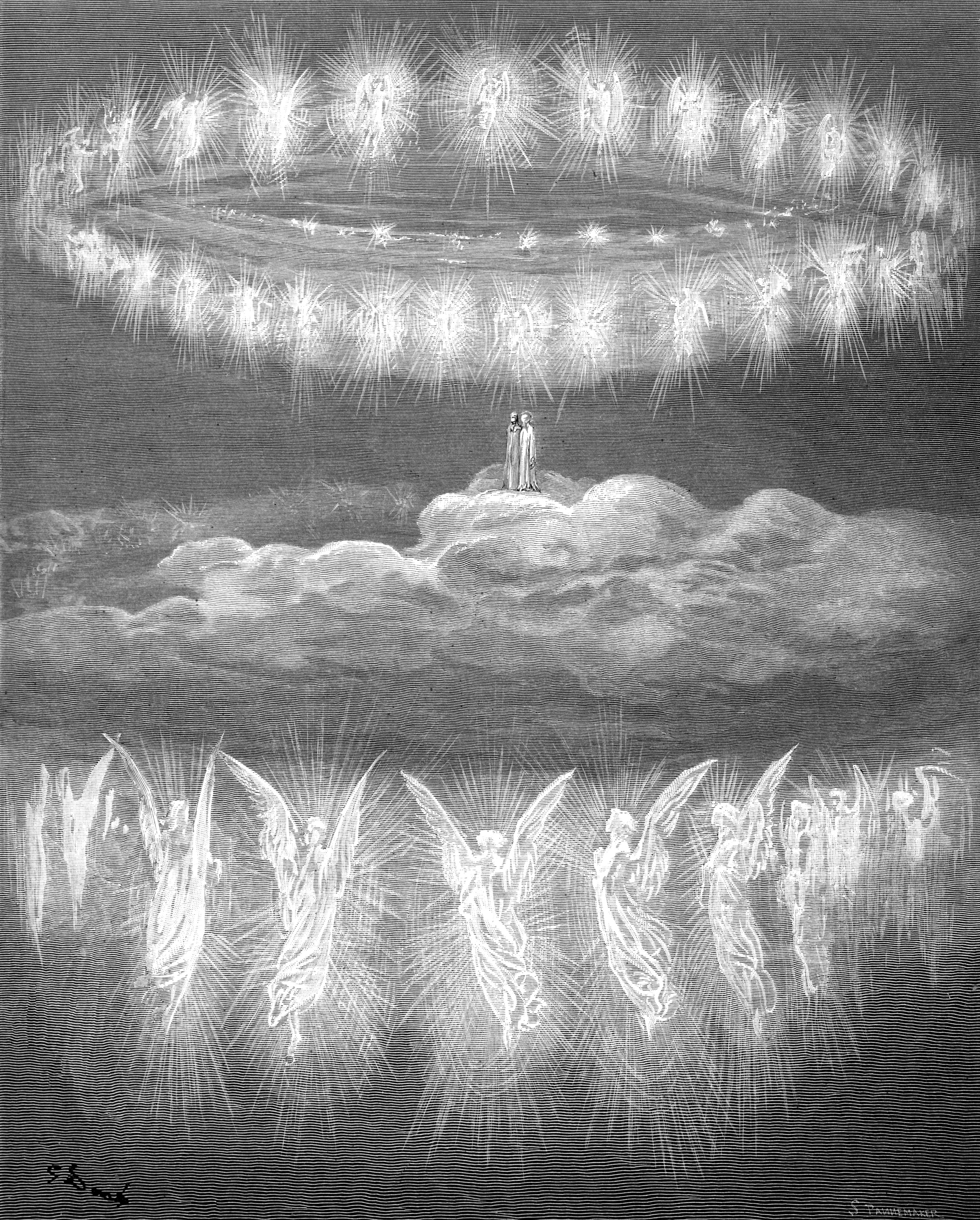
Engraving for Dante's Paradise (Paradiso) by Gustave Doré

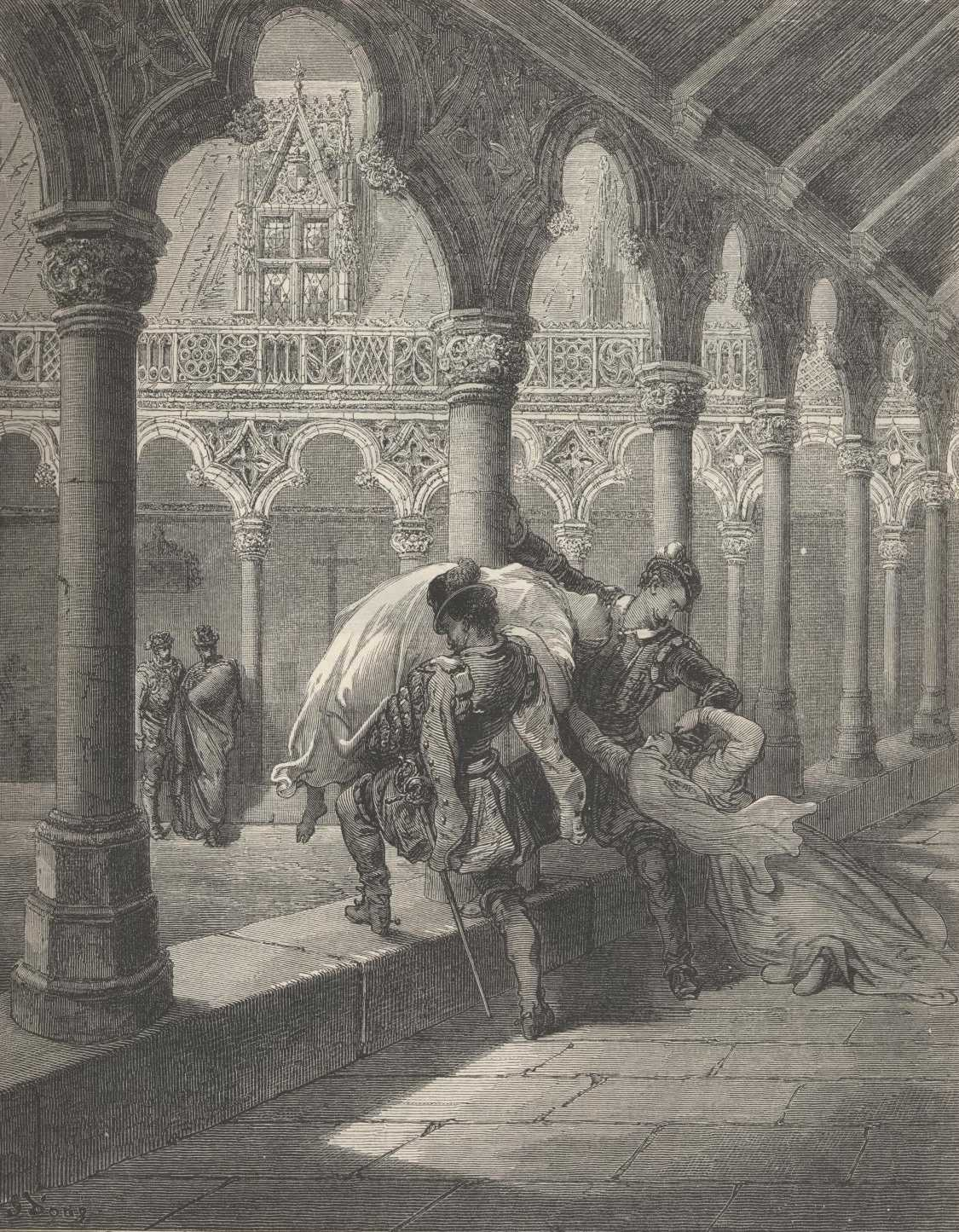
Don Quijote engraving by Gustave Doré

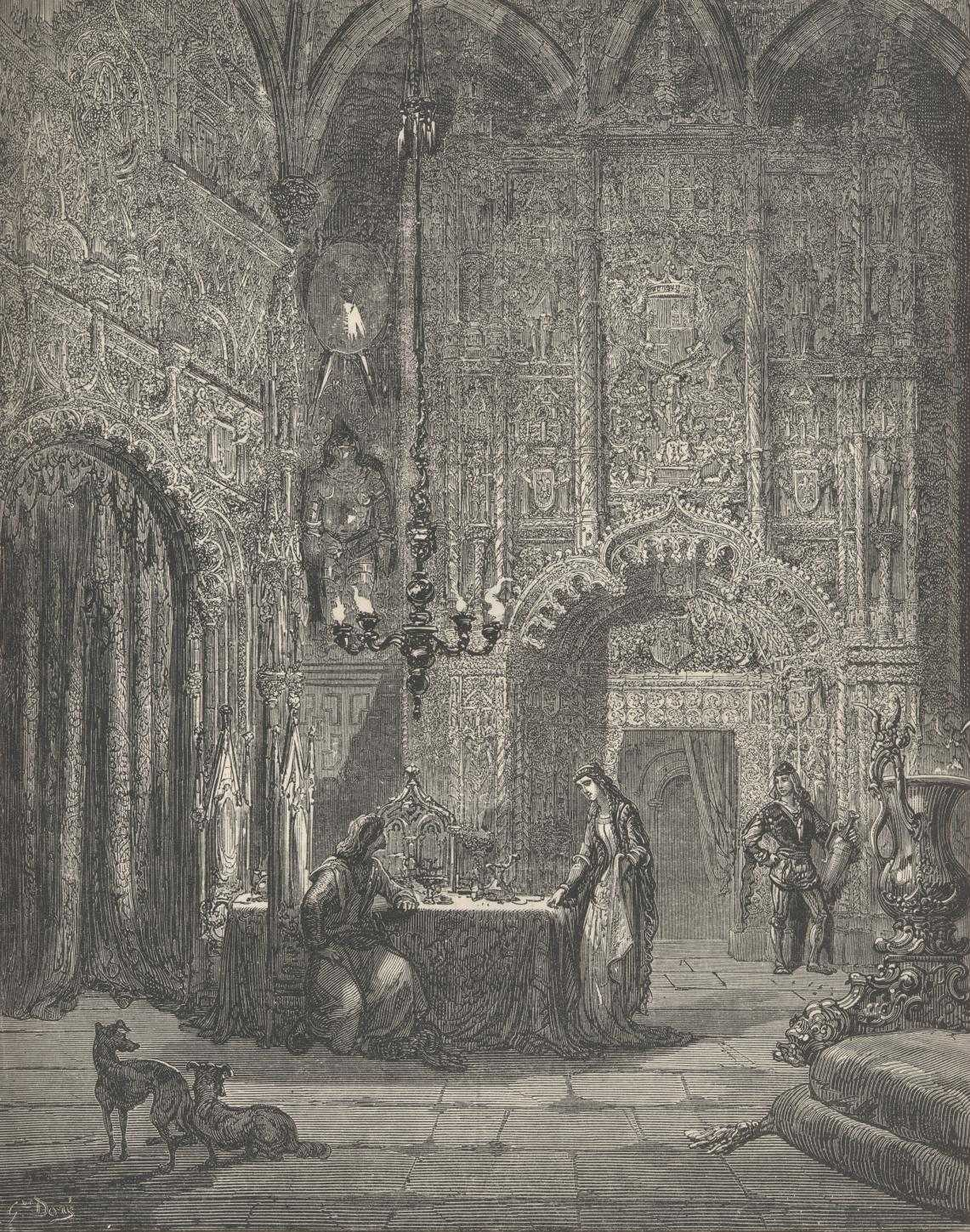
Another Don Quijote engraving by Gustave Doré, who preferred to work with wood engravings.

== See also ==
- Flammarion engraving, a celebrated wood engraving.

== Bibliography ==
- Bliss, Douglas Percy. A History of Wood Engraving: The Original Edition (2013) ISBN 1620874695
- Bluemel, Kristin. Enchanted Wood: Engraving a Place for Women Artists in Rural Britain, University of Minnesota Press, 2026.
- Brett, Simon. An Engraver's Globe (2002) ISBN 1901648125
- Brett, Simon. Wood Engraving: How to Do It (3rd ed. 2011 ) ISBN 1408127261
- Brett, Simon. Engravers: A Handbook for the Nineties (1987) ISBN 1851830030
- Carrington, James B. 'American Illustration and the Reproductive Arts', Scribner's Magazine; (July 1992), pp. 123–128.
- Desmet, Anna. Scene Through Wood: A Century of Modern Wood Engraving (2020) ISBN 9781910807378
- Garrett, Albert. British Wood Engraving of the 20th Century: A Personal View (1980) ISBN 0859676048
- Garrett, Albert. A History of British Wood Engraving (1978) ISBN 0859360776
- Hamerton, Philip; Spielmann, Marion (1911). "Wood Engraving" . In Chisholm, Hugh (ed.). Encyclopædia Britannica. Vol. 28 (11th ed.). Cambridge University Press. pp. 798–801.
- Linton, William James. Wood Engraving: A Manual of Instruction (1884) ISBN 1120959225
- Mackley, George. Wood Engraving (1981) ISBN 0905418840
- Moser, Barry. Wood Engraving: The Art of Wood Engraving and Relief Engraving (2006) ISBN 9781567922790
- Museum of Fine Arts, Springfield MA. New England Engraved, The Prints of Asa Cheffetz (1984) ISBN 0916746100
- Pery, Jenny. A Being More Intense: The Art of Six Wood Engravers (2009) ISBN 095565761X
- Russell, James. Ravilious: Wood Engravings (2019) ISBN 0957666551
- Taylor, Welford Dunaway. The Woodcut Art of J.J.Lankes (1999) ISBN 1567920497
- Uglow, Jenny. Nature's Engraver: A Life of Thomas Bewick (2006) ISBN 0374112363
- Walker, George. The Woodcut Artist's Handbook: Techniques and Tools for Relief Printmaking (2010) ISBN 1554076358
- Woodberry, George Edward. A History of Wood-Engraving (2015) ISBN 9781523768097
