= Denver, Norfolk =

Village in Norfolk, England

Coordinates: 52.58827°N 0.37959°E

Denver
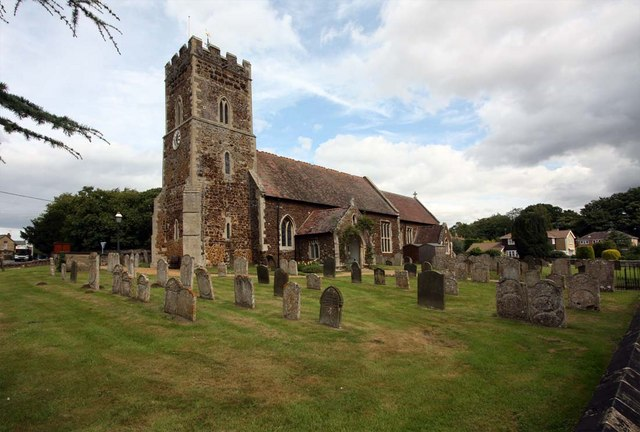
- St Mary's Church

- Location within Norfolk
- Area: 10.59 km^{2} (4.09 sq mi)
- Population: 912 (2021 census)
  - Density: 86/km^{2} (220/sq mi)
- OS grid reference: TF613016
- Civil parish: Denver
- District: King's Lynn and West Norfolk
- Shire county: Norfolk
- Region: East
- Country: England
- Sovereign state: United Kingdom
- Post town: DOWNHAM MARKET
- Postcode district: PE38
- Police: Norfolk
- Fire: Norfolk
- Ambulance: East of England
- UK Parliament: South West Norfolk

Denver is a village and civil parish in the English county of Norfolk.

Denver is 1 mile (1.6 km) south of Downham Market and 37 miles (60 km) west of Norwich. The village is east of and has land straddling the River Great Ouse.

== History ==
Denver's name is of Anglo-Saxon origin and derives from the Old English for a passage or crossing used by the Danes. Alternatively, the den element may represent the Old English word denu in its older sense of "low, flat place", in which case the placename might mean "[place of difficult] passage across the marshes".

Denver acted as the terminus for the Roman road the Fen Causeway, which began in Peterborough.

In the Domesday Book, Denver is listed as a settlement of 43 households in the hundred of Clackclose. In 1086, the village was part of the estates of William de Warenne.

Denver Sluice controls the water levels between the tidal and non-tidal Great Ouse. In 1651, the first sluice to help with the drainage of The Fens was built by the Dutch architect Cornelius Vermuyden. The sluice was rebuilt, after bursting in 1713, in 1750. John Rennie the Younger built a newer sluice and bridge in 1834. It was enlarged in 1923 and the flood gates have been replaced several times. The four-arched bridge has its piers extended to form two locks. It is Grade II-listed (the lowest of the three categories).

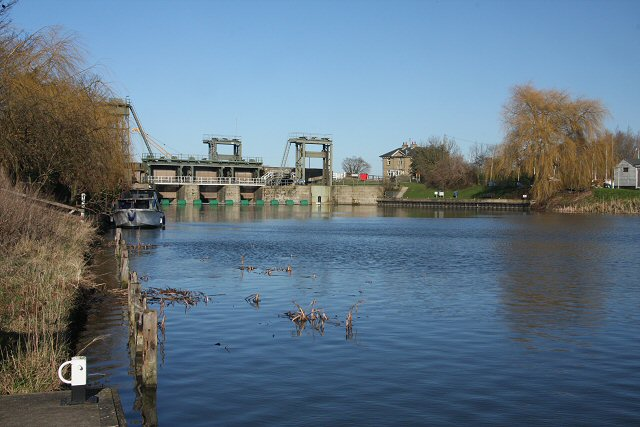
Denver Sluice

Denver Windmill was built in the mid-nineteenth century and is not in use due to removal of the sails in 2017.

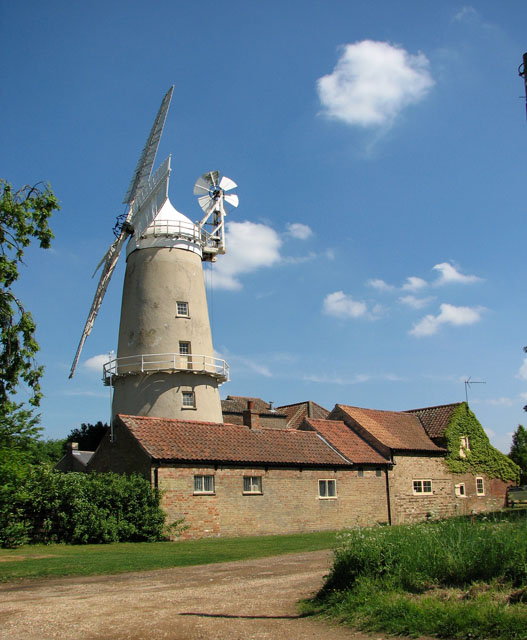
Denver Windmill

Denver Railway Station opened in 1847 as a stop on the Great Eastern Railway between King's Lynn and Cambridge. The station was closed to passengers in 1930.

In October, 1942 a Short Stirling bomber aircraft crashed in the parish killing all eleven crewmen on board.

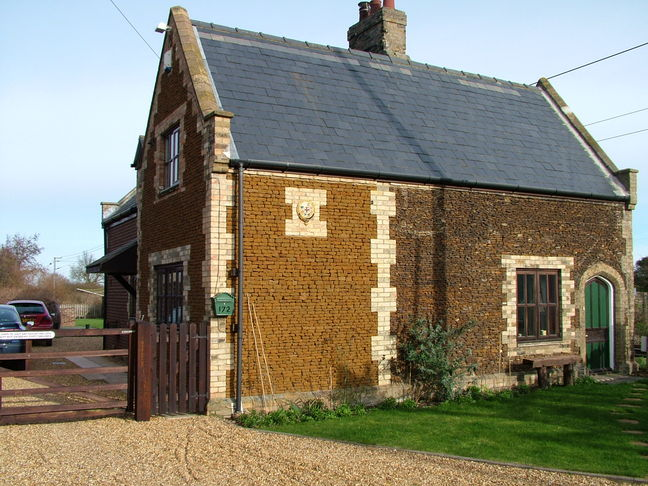
Denver station building

== Geography ==
According to the 2021 census, Denver has a population of 912 people which shows an increase from the 890 people listed in the 2011 census.

Denver is located along the course of the River Great Ouse and at the junction of the A10, between London and King's Lynn, and the A1122, between Outwell and Swaffham.

== St Mary's Church ==
Denver's Church of England parish church is dedicated to Saint Mary and physically dates from the thirteenth century with earlier foundation. It is on Ryston Road near to most local homes and has been Grade-II listed since 1951. It is largely built from carrstone and was heavily restored in the 1870s. The church features stained-glass installed by Ian Pace and a Victorian font.

== Famous residents ==
- Robert Brady (1627–1700) academic and historian, born in Denver.
- George William Manby (1765–1854) author and inventor, born in Denver.
- Peter Sharpe (b.1944) Norfolk cricketer, born in Denver.
- Andy English (b.1956) wood-engraver and educator, born in Denver.

== In popular culture ==
In the novels of Dorothy L. Sayers, the fictional Duke of Denver's family seat is supposedly based on the village.

== Governance ==
Denver an electoral ward for local elections and is part of the district of King's Lynn and West Norfolk.

The village's national constituency is South West Norfolk which has been represented by the Labour Party's Terry Jermy MP.

== War memorial ==
Denver shares a war memorial with the nearby villages of Fordham, Ryston and Bexwell located on the village green taking the form of hexagonal stone column topped with a crucifix. The memorial lists the following names for Denver for the First World War:

Rank	Name	Unit	Date of death	Burial
QMS	Frederick Armsby	8th Bn, Norfolk Regiment	4 Dec. 1917	St Mary's churchyard
Sgt.	William Dack	Y Coy., Army Service Corps	22 Mar. 1919	St Mary's churchyard
Sgt.	George R. Day	1st Bn, Norfolk Regiment	25 Oct. 1914	Le Touret Memorial
Sgt.	Arthur Day	2nd Bn, King's Royal Rifle Corps	31 Oct. 1914	Menin Gate
St1C	George Beck	HMS Queen Mary	31 May 1916	Portsmouth Memorial
St1C	Harry Paul	HMS Queen Mary	31 May 1916	Portsmouth Memorial
A/Cpl.	William Hassack DCM	6th (City Rifles) Bn, London Regt.	15 Sep. 1916	Thiepval Memorial
LCpl.	Charles H. Holliday	Coldstream Guards	15 Sep. 1916	Unknown
LCpl.	Frederick H. Scarboro	9th Bn, Norfolk Regiment	28 Apr. 1917	Loos Memorial
LCpl.	Reginald P. H. Howlett	1st Bn, Queen's West Kent Regiment	27 Sep. 1918	Gouzeaucourt Cem.
Pte.	John Garrod	6th Bn, Border Regiment	3 Aug. 1917	Mendinghem Cemetery
Pte.	Arthur Hilling	1st Bn, Coldstream Guards	15 Sep. 1916	Thiepval Memorial
Pte.	George Akred	1/4th Bn, East Yorkshire Regiment	29 Nov. 1917	Haringhe Cemetery
Pte.	John W. Hall	1st Bn, Essex Regiment	18 Nov. 1918	St Sever Cemetery
Pte.	James W. Rodwell	2/6th Bn, Manchester Regiment	13 May 1918	St Mary's churchyard
Pte.	Robert Fountain	2nd Bn, Norfolk Regiment	14 Apr. 1915	Basra War Cemetery
Pte.	Horace Allcock	3rd Bn, Norfolk Regt.	30 Dec. 1917	Shatby Memorial
Pte.	Francis H. Holliday	8th Bn, Norfolk Regt.	21 Oct. 1916	Thiepval Memorial
Pte.	Harold Monk	Norfolk Regt.	13 Dec. 1914	St Mary's churchyard
Pte.	William E. Fendick	2nd Bn, Suffolk Regiment	3 Mar. 1915	Menin Gate
Pte.	H. Hurrell	2nd Bn, Suffolk Regt.	28 Nov. 1919	St Mary's churchyard
Pte.	Ernest R. B. Chapman	1st Bn, Queen's West Kent Regiment	24 Apr. 1917	Orchard Dump Cem.
Pte.	Horace Sutlefe	9th Bn, Royal Welch Fusiliers	8 Jun. 1917	Klein Cemetery
Pte.	Thomas Redcar	1st Bn, Wiltshire Regiment	1 Nov. 1918	South-West Cemetery
Pte.	William H. Holliday	1st Bn, Yorkshire Regiment	29 Oct. 1918	India Gate
