= Barbarian Press =

Canadian book publisher

- Founded: 1977
- Founders: Jan Elsted, Crispin Elsted
- Official website: Barbarian Press

Barbarian Press is a fine press publisher, owned and operated by Jan Elsted and Crispin Elsted in Mission, B.C., Canada. In 1977, the Elsteds were working toward their PhD's in English literature at the University of London when they met Graham Williams of the Florin Press, who introduced them to letterpress printing using movable type and hand presses. By the time they returned to Canada in 1978 they had abandoned their academic careers, purchased type and a few presses, and were "determined to make beautiful books for the rest of their lives".

Publication decisions and editorial work are shared. The design and typesetting (usually by hand) are by Crispin, and the presswork by Jan. The press publishes in several main areas—literary classics, translations, typography, and books on wood engraving. They publish works that they themselves would like to read, with a particular focus (to quote Jan) on "books which celebrate wood engravings as an art form."' Most of their publications use wood engravings as illustrations, and the press publishes an ongoing series of monographs on individual engravers called Endgrain Editions The Elsteds periodically provide workshops in their pressroom. Since 2021 they have been joined at the press by their daughter, Felicity Elsted, who works as a printer and compositor on a part-time basis.

Recent books include a new textual edition of Shakespeare's Pericles in two volumes, with over a hundred engravings by Simon Brett; a selection from Richard Barham's The Ingoldsby Legends, illustrated with unpublished wood engravings by the Dalziel brothers, engraved in the 1870s; and an edition of the odes of John Keats, with engravings by Andy English. The press's text types include Bembo, Poliphilus and Blado, Joanna, Van Dijck, Garamond, and Antigone (Greek); the press also has a large collection of printer's flowers and borders, including the Curwen Press collection of Monotype ornaments.

The Elsteds were awarded the Robert R. Reid Award for lifetime achievement or extraordinary contributions to the book arts in Canada by the Alcuin Society in 2015.
