= Bankside Gallery =

Public art gallery in London, England

Coordinates: 51°30′29″N 0°6′7″W

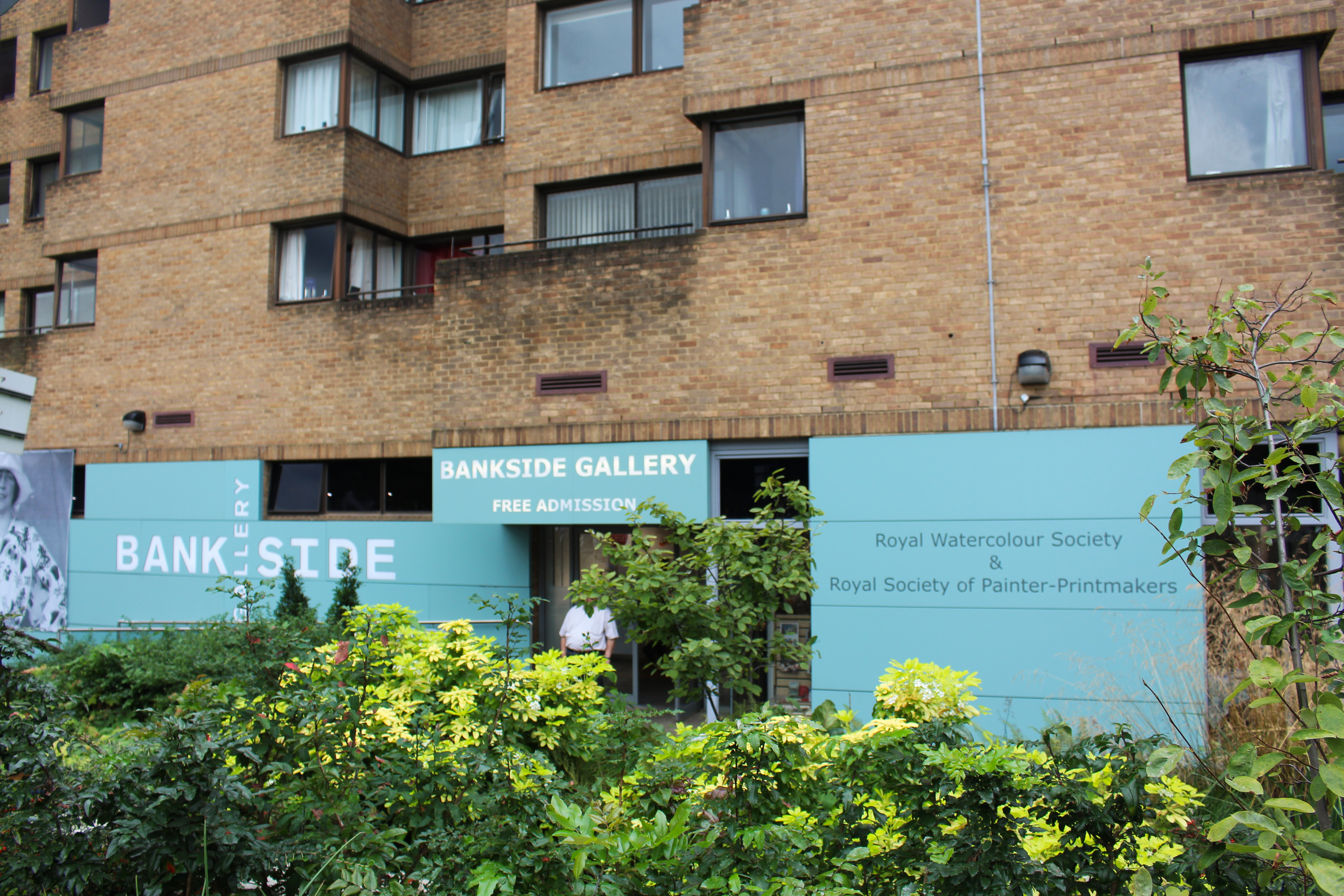
Bankside Gallery entrance

Bankside Gallery is a public art gallery in Bankside, London, England. Opened by Queen Elizabeth II in 1980, Bankside is an educational charity, situated on the Thames Path just along from Tate Modern.

The gallery is home to the Royal Watercolour Society and the Royal Society of Painter-Printmakers. The members of these societies follow a 200-year-old tradition of being elected by their peers. The gallery houses changing exhibitions of contemporary watercolours and prints, which are accompanied by special events including artists' talks and tours. A full education programme covering the theory and practice of art is organised every year.

Bankside Gallery is open daily during exhibitions, from 11 a.m. to 6 p.m.
