= Hilary Paynter =

British wood engraver and printmaker

Hilary Jasmine Erica Paynter MBE (born 1943) is a British wood engraver and printmaker.

She was born in Dunfermline and spent much of her life abroad in places such as Malta and China. She studied sculpture and wood engraving at Portsmouth College of Art before embarking on a career within education. Wood engraving became her medium of choice when she had a child and stone carving in the kitchen became too hazardous. Alongside engraving, Paynter had a full-time career running the Special Needs Department of a large, inner London secondary comprehensive before training as an Educational Psychologist. Since 2000, Paynter has worked as a full-time artist. Her output is prolific, she has created an estimated 700 wood engravings. Her subject matters include epic landscapes and heroic structures interspersed with challenging socio-political prints. Her work is held in many public collections, such as the Victoria & Albert Museum (London), The Ashmolean (Oxford), the Fitzwilliam Museum (Cambridge) and the Central Academy of Fine Arts (Beijing). The Victoria & Albert Museum hold over 70 of her engravings spanning over 60 years.

Paynter was instrumental in resurrecting the Society of Wood Engravers in the 1980s, organising the first exhibition in over 20 years at the now closed Garden Gallery in Kew, London. Since then, Paynter has held various positions in the Society including Chair and has continued to organise the Society's Annual Exhibition throughout. In meeting the Society's aims to promote wood engraving, Paynter books galleries from St Ives to the Shetland Islands and has even taken the show abroad to Russia and Georgia.

Paynter is an Honorary Member of the Royal Birmingham Society of Artists (RBSA) and a Past President of the Royal Society of Painter Printmakers. As part of her role as Honorary Member of the RBSA, Paynter has participated as a guest artist in print exhibitions and delivered printmaking workshops for adults. In recent years, Paynter has produced a large illustrated book, titled Full Circle, to chart her work and its development. Paynter has illustrated many books including collections of poems by Carol Ann Duffy and Simon Armitage both published by Andrew J Moorhouse. In 2003, Paynter was commissioned to commemorate Thomas Bewick's 250th anniversary. The resulting Metro Project was a series of 32 vitreous enamel panels featuring Paynter's engravings, stretching 22 metres along Newcastle's Metro Central Station's platform. In 2016, Paynter was commissioned by The Arts Council, The Baring Foundation and Devon Guild to create a body of work on the theme of ageing. Paynter's body of work, entitled The Age of Enlightenment, was notable for its positive viewpoint on ageing.

Paynter was appointed Member of the Order of the British Empire (MBE) in the 2023 Birthday Honours for services to the arts.
