= Society of Wood Engravers =

Society to promote white line wood engravings

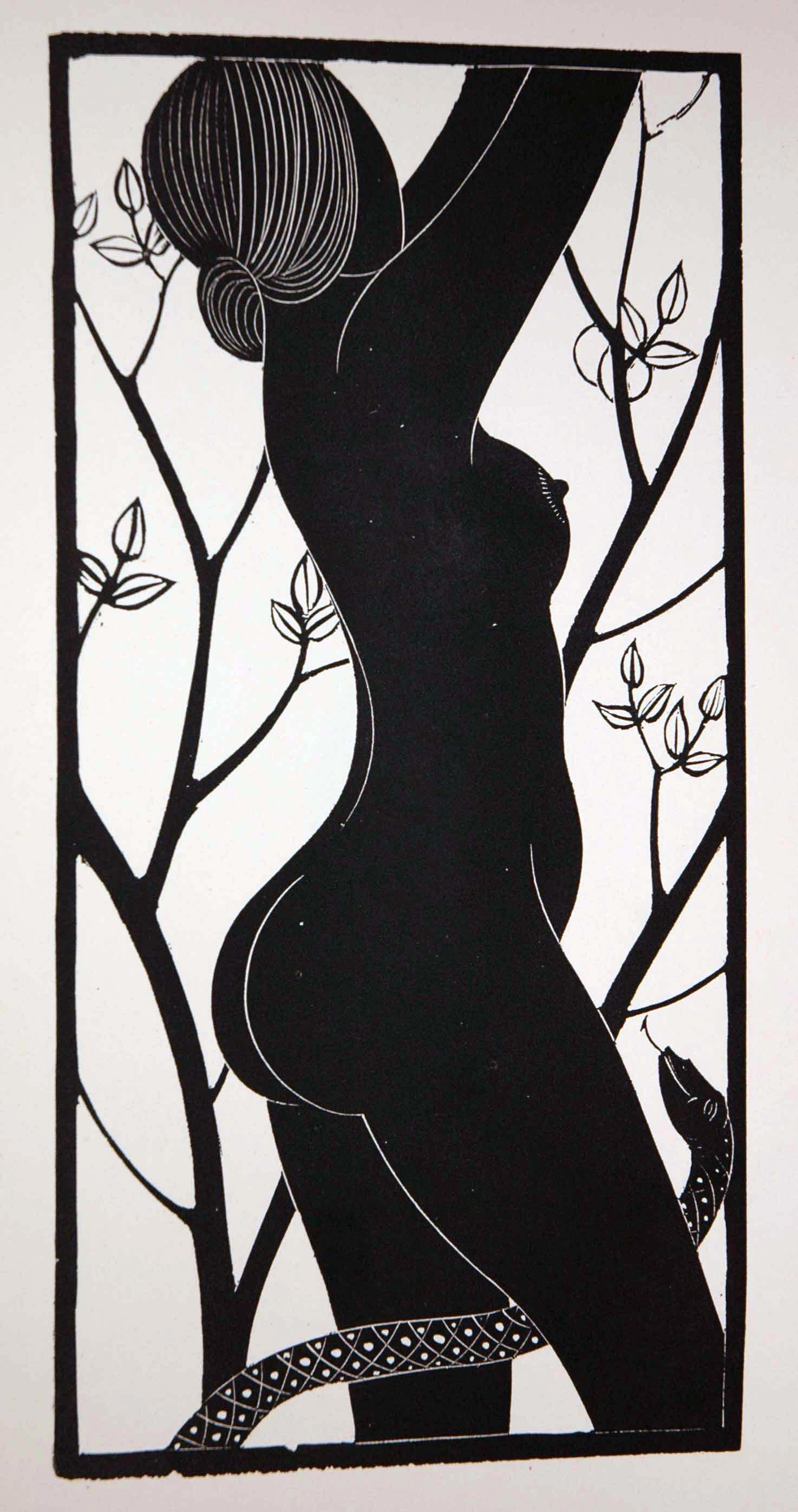
Eve, a modern wood engraving by Eric Gill, a founder member of the Society, 1929

The Society of Wood Engravers (SWE) is a UK-based artists’ exhibiting society formed in 1920, one of its founder-members being Eric Gill. Membership is restricted to artists who use wood engraving, as distinct from the separate discipline of woodcut. The Society also awards honorary membership to collectors and enthusiasts.

== History ==
The Society of Wood Engravers was founded on 27 March 1920 by a group of 10 artists who wanted to promote wood engraving as a medium for modern artists. Unlike other societies of the time devoted to various aspects of relief printmaking, the SWE survived by successfully engaging upcoming generations and celebrated its centenary in 2020.

The development of wood engraving as a medium for artists, as distinct from reproductive trade engraving, began in the 1890s. Charles Ricketts and Charles Haslewood Shannon were the first in modern times to cut the blocks of their own designs or, more to the point, create their designs by the process of engraving them. The foundation of the Society built on the development of this approach by a later generation of artists and in the Modernist era. The Society's founder members are listed below. Historically, white-line engraving on end-grain wood and black-line work on the plank side of the wood were both referred to as ‘woodcuts’. The habit of calling the first method ‘wood engraving’, and the second ‘woodcut’, crystallised after World War II. The two methods use different cuts of wood and different sets of tools, however confusion between wood engravings and woodcuts is not uncommon.

The Society went into abeyance during the 1960s but was revived in 1984 by Hilary Paynter and Simon Brett. The major regeneration of the SWE, virtually amounting to a re-foundation after a difficult mid-century, was built on the distinction between ‘wood engraving’ and ‘woodcut’: by then the more visible as the two traditions developed in different ways. Now that synthetic materials can be used for engraving on, it has been suggested that it is the fine engraving rather than the material engraved which really defines the medium; this is the distinctive quality many practitioners are drawn to and the reason for the continued growth of the Society.

== Founder members ==
- Philip Hagreen
- Lucien Pissarro
- Robert Gibbings
- E M O’Rourke Dickey
- Sydney Lee
- Noel Rooke
- Edward Gordon Craig
- Eric Gill
- Gwen Raverat
- John Nash

== Aims ==
The SWE was founded primarily to promote wood engraving in the European manner – printing with oil-based inks in a press, rather than with water-based ink and manual pressure in the Japanese tradition. Secondly, its aim was to promote the work of artist-engravers as distinct from the nineteenth-century artisans who engraved designs provided by artists but were not necessarily artists themselves. The artists Noel Rooke and Robert Gibbings, were the driving force behind the Society. They determined to hold annual exhibitions of their work and to promote wood engraving through teaching. The Society remains committed to this ethos over 100 years later.

== Annual exhibition ==
Wood engraving has multiple applications in fine-art prints, in book illustration and in commerce. It attracts passionate practitioners who continue to develop experimental themes. The Society reflects these in its annual exhibition, which is the largest and most important event in the SWE’s calendar. The majority of works selected are wood engravings, however other forms of relief print such as linocut and woodcut may be submitted. Submission to this exhibition is open to members and non-members alike. All entries go before a selection committee which includes the current Chair and two other elected members of the Society. Initially restricted to London, the show now tours galleries across the UK.

== Members and subscribers ==
In order to become a member the applicant must have exhibited wood engravings in the Annual Exhibition for three years, although these don’t need to run consecutively. Submission of a portfolio of work including preparatory work and sketch books will then be subject to scrutiny by the Member’s Selection Committee. Members of the Society may enter a third piece of work for the annual show in addition to the two allowed for non-members. A number of members are also members of the Royal Society of Painter-Printmakers.

Anyone can become a subscriber of the Society by payment of an annual fee.

An annual general meeting is held, usually in the autumn, to which all are invited. Another social gathering held annually is the SWE Picnic. The Society has cordial relations with the Wood Engravers’ Network (WEN), an American group with similar aims.

== Publications ==
The SWE publishes a monthly online newsletter of upcoming events and a quarterly journal of record, information and discussion entitled ‘Multiples’. These are circulated to all subscribers and members.

Special occasion publications range from Christmas cards and broadsheets to limited edition boxed sets of engravings.

== Funding ==
The SWE receives no outside funding. A bequest from earlier member William Rawlinson has enabled grants to students and funding for special projects. More recently, the Rachel Reckitt Prize has been one of the prizes awarded at the Annual Exhibition, which is funded by the Golsoncott Foundation. The Bewick Society, founded to celebrate the work of British wood engraver Thomas Bewick, also fund a prize.

== Chairs of the Society ==
Since 1984 the committee has been chaired by the following people:

- George Tute 1984 – 1986
- Simon Brett 1986 – 1992
- Ian Stephens 1992 – 1995
- Sarah van Niekerk 1995 – 1998
- Hilary Paynter 1998 – 2006
- Peter Lawrence 2006 – 2011
- Harry Brockway 2011 – 2014
- Geri Waddington 2015 – 2018
- Chris Daunt 2018 – 2020
- Merlin Waterson 2020 – 2022
- Louise Hayward – Current Chair since 2022

== Other former members ==
- Simon Brett
- David Jones
- Sydney Lee
- Paul Nash
- Iain Macnab
- Gwenda Morgan
- Herry Perry
- Hester Sainsbury
- Leon Underwood
