= Muriel Rose =

Crafts collector, curator, gallery owner and writer

- Born: 1897
- Died: 1986 (aged 88–89)
- Occupations: Crafts collector, curator, gallery owner, writer

Muriel Rose (1897–1986) was a collector and publiciser of modern craft and design, a curator, gallery owner and writer, and important in the later Arts and Crafts movement. She has been described as having "made a formidable contribution to the development of the crafts" and as an arbiter of what became the British studio pottery "canon."

Rose was born in 1897. She initially worked with Dorothy Hutton at the Three Shields Gallery in Kensington. She and Margaret Turnbull started their own gallery, the Little Gallery, at 5 Ellis Street near Sloane Square in London in 1928. They sold crafts sourced through the Rural Industries Bureau Scheme, established to support mining communities in Wales and in Durham. Rose "played a major role in re-establishing patchwork and quilting in Wales". The notes she made of her meetings with the women from mining communities whose work she sold give insight into the social conditions of the time.

The shop also sold the work of Phyllis Barron, Dorothy Larcher, Enid Marx, Catherine Cockerell, Tirzah Garwood, Katherine Pleydell-Bouverie, Norah Braden, Bernard Leach, Shōji Hamada and Michael Cardew. It was also an outlet for crafts from other parts of the world. The shop closed in 1940.

Following this, Rose, with Bernard Leach, selected British crafts to be exhibited in America. This became the Exhibition of Modern British Crafts, first displayed at the Metropolitan Museum of Art in New York in 1942, and then around America and Canada for the next three years. This led to the British Council beginning its own collection of crafts, with Rose as the Council's Crafts and Industrial Design Officer. In 1946, she curated an exhibition of British rural handicrafts which travelled to Australia and New Zealand.

Rose was one of the organisers of the 1952 International Conference of Potters and Weavers at Dartington Hall. Her book The Artist Potter in England (1954) was the first history of British studio pottery.

Rose was one of the founders and trustees of the Crafts Study Centre, and left her own collection and archive to it.

In the 1970s, Rose lived in Coggeshall in Essex. She died in 1986.

In 2020 a textile exhibition at Two Temple Place included work collected by Rose.
