= Dorothy Hutton =

English painter, calligrapher and printmaker (1889–1984)

Dorothy Hutton MVO
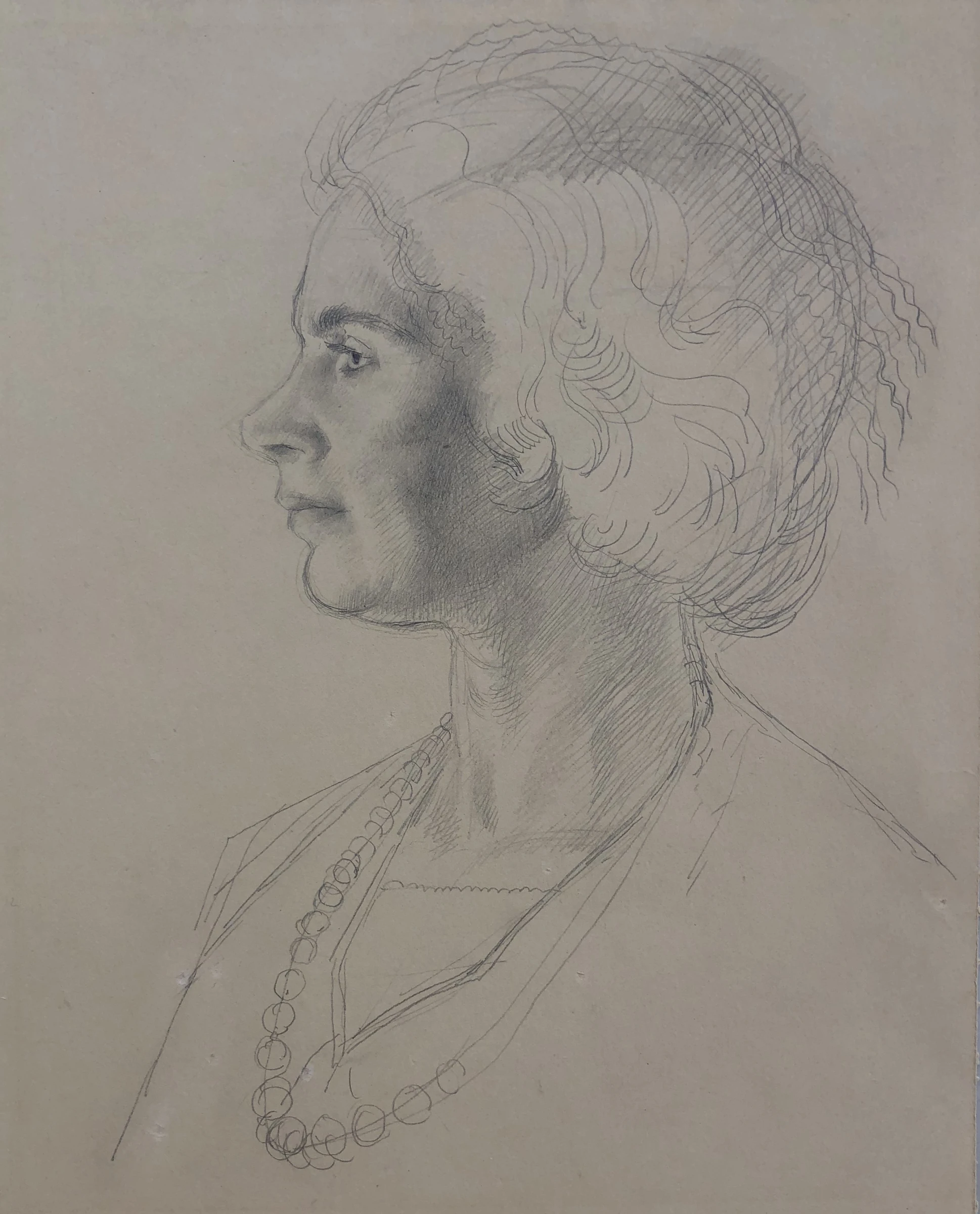
- Born: 21 November 1889; Bolton, England
- Died: 19 May 1984 (aged 94); London, England
- Education: Central School of Arts and Crafts
- Known for: painting, calligraphy, printmaking

Dorothy Hutton MVO (21 November 1889 – 19 May 1984) was an English painter, scribe and printmaker. She was particularly renowned as a calligrapher and most widely known for her London Transport posters.

== Early life and education ==
Hutton was born in Bolton, Lancashire, daughter of the Reverend Frederick Robert Chapman Hutton (president of the Bolton Literary Society and member of the "Bolton Whitmanites" — a loose group of English admirers and correspondents of American poet Walt Whitman). Her elder brother, Sydney Frederick Hutton, was killed in the First World War during the Battle of the Somme. Her cousin, Captain Anthony David Hutton OBE, would go on to organise the evacuation of refugees from Cyprus during the Turkish invasion of 1974.

She was educated at Queen Margaret's School, York, and later studied architecture. She worked at the Curwen Press during the First World War. In the 1920s, she attended the Central School of Arts and Crafts, studying with F. Ernest Jackson.

== Career ==
Hutton first garnered attention in mainstream newspapers when she entered the Daily Mail's 1920 Exhibition of Village Signs, placing third out of 617 entries. Her Battle of Hastings-inspired design for the village of Battle, Sussex was "greatly admired", and earned her £200 in prize money (equivalent to £7,500 in 2024), launching a "long and productive career".

In October 1920, Hutton, together with a group of other northern artist-craftspeople living in London who wished to show their work in Manchester, launched an exhibition at Houldsworth Hall. The initiative was very successful, leading to the formation of the Red Rose Guild of Artworkers by printmaker Margaret Pilkington OBE in January the following year. Hutton became a Guild member, and assisted Pilkington in the Guild's early years. The Guild came to be "regarded as the most influential national outlet for makers" during the first half of the twentieth century.

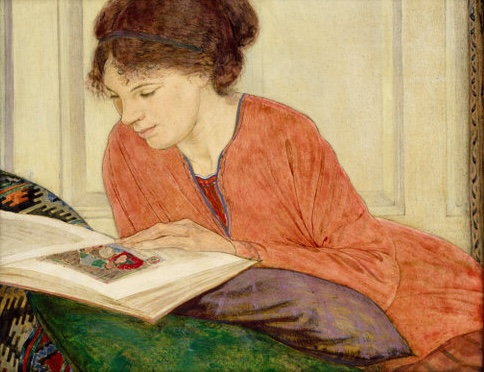
Hutton by F. Ernest Jackson, 1921

In 1922, Hutton opened the Three Shields Gallery in Holland Street, London, to display her own work, as well as that of other artists. Hutton exhibited prints, drawings and watercolors. She also sold greeting cards that she designed, marketing them under the Holly Bush label, as well as tags for Christmas presents and place names for children's parties. Through her gallery, Hutton championed and platformed many emerging craftspeople who would achieve notability, such as Phyllis Barron and Dorothy Larcher, Enid Marx RDI, Katherine Pleydell-Bouverie, Ethel Mairet RDI, Michael Cardew CBE, pioneering studio potter Frances Emma Richards, John Paul Cooper and Bernard Leach CH CBE.

Poster design by Dorothy Hutton for London Transport, 1939

Well known for her depictions of flowers, Hutton was commissioned by London Transport for multiple poster designs between 1922 and 1954, including seasonal posters advertising flowers in bloom throughout the city, as well as posters of historical landmarks. Hutton exhibited widely in the 1930s and 1940s, and at the Royal Academy in London for over 60 years, from 1923 to 1984. She also exhibited with the New English Art Club and at the Walker Art Gallery in Liverpool.

Hutton was the official artist to the Crown Office, and among other works was responsible for rolls of honour and many patents of nobility for the Crown Office and the House of Lords, as well as a memorial to General Dwight Eisenhower in Bushy Park, West London. She was a co-founder, in 1921, of the Society of Scribes and Illuminators, and was also a member of the Arts and Crafts Exhibition Society and Senefelder Club. In 1964, she was one of the first women to be admitted as a member of the Art Workers' Guild.

Hutton worked in several media throughout her career, including calligraphy, tempera, and printmaking in both paper and textiles. Among her works of calligraphy are the Metropolitan Police Roll of Honour (on which she collaborated with Vera Law), the Barclays Bank Roll of Honour, the RAF Coastal Command War Record, the Record for the Honourable Company of Master Mariners, the Metropolitan Borough of Fulham Roll of Honour of the Great War, the Queen's University Belfast Roll of Honour, the gold lettering on the war memorial tablet in the church at Great Horwood in Buckinghamshire, and a map of the Cotswolds, with most of the towns indicated by churches.

In the 1959 New Year Honours, Hutton was appointed a Member of the Royal Victorian Order, fifth class. She lived in Kensington and Chelsea, London. At her memorial service, held on 20 June 1984 at the Queen's Chapel of the Savoy, the chaplain to the Royal Victorian Order officiated.

== Legacy ==
Detail from the letters-patent creating Charles Duke of Cornwall as Prince of Wales in 1958; written and illuminated by Dorothy Hutton for Queen Elizabeth II, as official artist to the Crown Office

Donald Jackson MBE, Hutton's successor as official scribe and calligrapher to the Crown Office, remembers Hutton as "a very confident woman. She had her own gallery – a crafts gallery in Notting Hill – and she was quite formidable". Distinguished calligrapher Heather Child characterises the work that Hutton undertook for the Crown Office as "important".

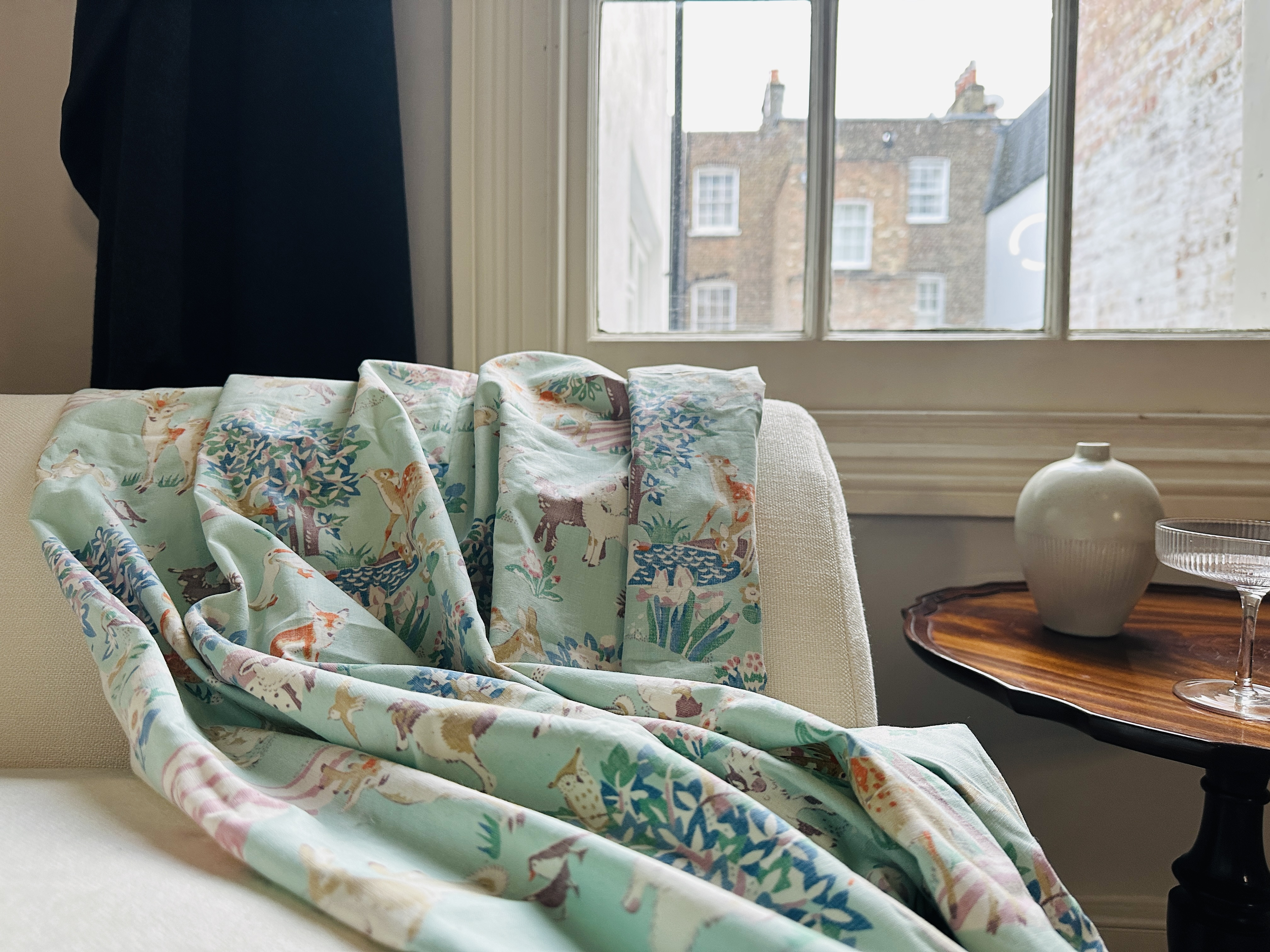
Furnishing fabric for nursery, with design of farm and forest animals, birds, trees, ponds and fields; print designed by Dorothy Hutton

In 20th Century Pattern Design, Lesley Jackson describes "the multi-talented Dorothy Hutton" as "an accomplished illuminator, letterer and lithographer". The Penrose Graphic Arts International Annual expands on Hutton's impact on the design of contemporary printed greeting cards:

A pioneer in the modern card was Dorothy Hutton. Her first cards date from 1919, were mostly printed from line blocks, and were coloured by hand. The fact that during World War I Miss Hutton had worked at the Curwen Press gave her an insight into printing processes, then rare amongst artists, added to which she was a member of the Senefelder Club and an exhibiting artist in her own right. You have to throw your mind back rather violently to appreciate how remarkable such cards seemed in the 'twenties ... [Y]et the idea was right, and because Miss Hutton had the courage to persevere, she has seen it take root and prosper. If you look for some key word to distinguish her cards, it is that each is clearly the sincere and natural expression of the artist's own sentiments and not those manufactured to suit the public taste.

— Noel Carrington, "The Contemporary Christmas Card", The Penrose Graphic Arts International Annual, Vol. 43 (1949)

Joanna Selborne, former Curator of Prints and Drawings at the Courtauld Gallery, lists Hutton "among the most distinguished" printmakers, alongside Enid Marx. Modern adaptations of Hutton's textile prints continue to be marketed today.

Hutton's Three Shields Gallery, described as "pioneering" by the British Council, is recognised as an important development in Britain's interwar arts scene, bringing many positive impacts for women artists and gallerists. According to Helen Ritchie of the Fitzwilliam Museum, University of Cambridge, Hutton was one of "a number of progressive and pioneering women [who] established successful and influential ... galleries in interwar London." Hutton's gallery was the first of such establishments to open, encouraging craftswomen to create work by providing a forum in which they could sell it. Jerwood Arts identifies the Three Shields Gallery as one of "a number of important outlets for designers wanting to sell high quality craftwork ... women ran many of these."

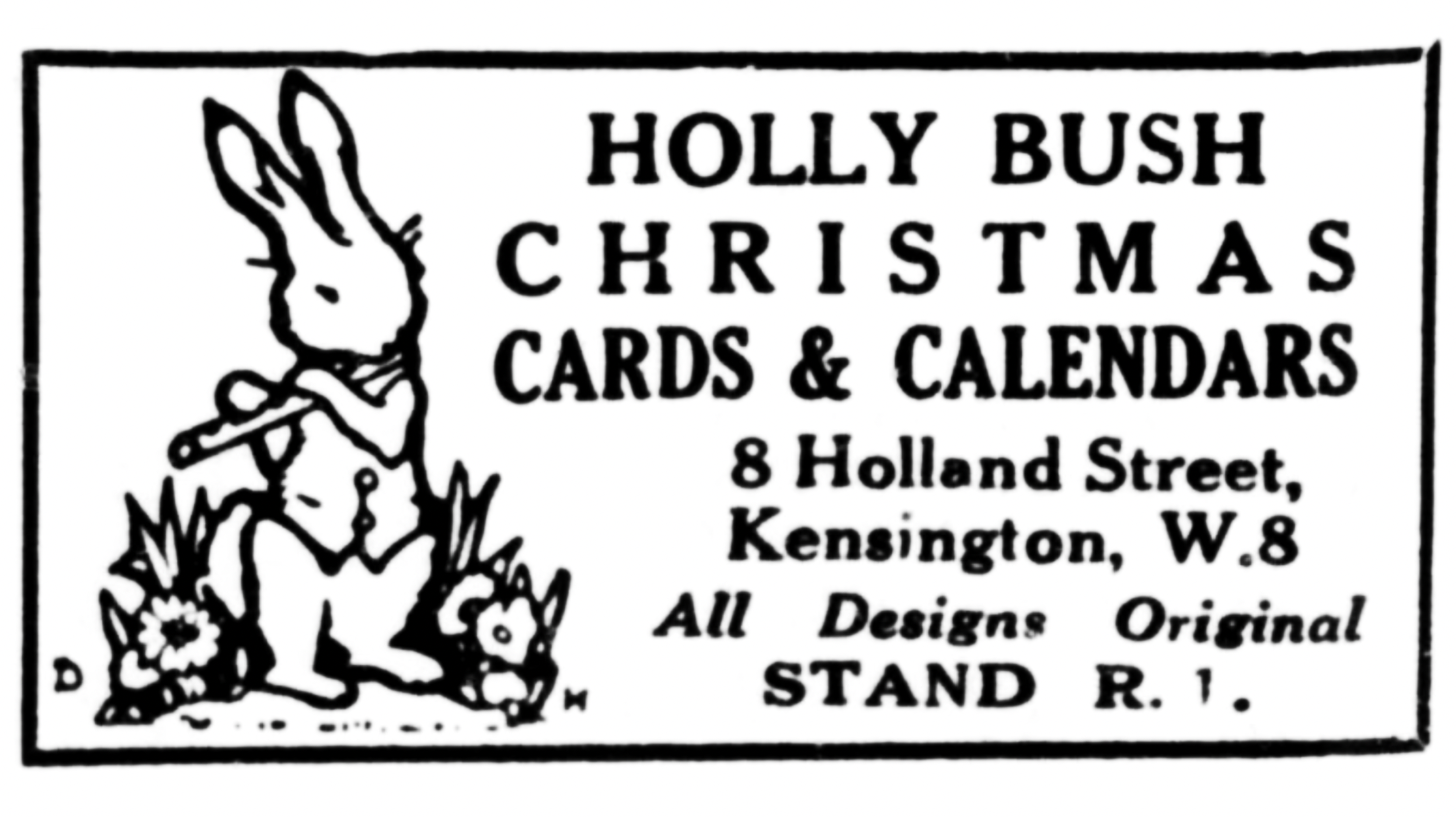
Press advertisement for Dorothy Hutton's greeting cards and gallery

Ritchie notes how Hutton and her peers "actively sought out new work, created a market for it, and carefully curated their spaces, acting as tastemakers and as conduits between the artist and the public. This complex and mutually supportive network of female artists and gallerists enabled its participants to live and work independently in new and non-traditional ways, often outside of the heteronormative sphere." The Ditchling Museum of Art + Craft further notes that Hutton was "influential in promoting this new, contemporary work in the context of a 'modern' lifestyle."

Hutton and her Three Shields Gallery both feature in Alison Love's 1997 historical romance novel Mallingford.

Hutton's work has been exhibited posthumously in retrospectives including 'I Don't Know Her Name, But I Know Her Work' at Central Saint Martins, 'Treasures Past and Present' at Fulham Palace and 'Words Made Beautiful', a 2022 exhibition of the Society of Scribes and Illuminators at the Mall Galleries, London.

Hutton is remembered by the Society of Scribes and Illuminators for "her distinguished work" and having "admirably fulfilled the objects assigned to [the Society]".

== Collections ==
The British Museum, Victoria and Albert Museum and National Portrait Gallery in London hold examples of Hutton's work, as do Yale University and the National Gallery of Canada. The London Transport Museum collection includes her 1935 poster Heather Time. The Whitworth Art Gallery and the University of the Arts London also hold works by Hutton.

== Works (incomplete) ==
Roll of Honour for the fallen of the Metropolitan Police in the First and Second World Wars, Westminster Abbey; lettering, decorations and miniatures by Dorothy Hutton

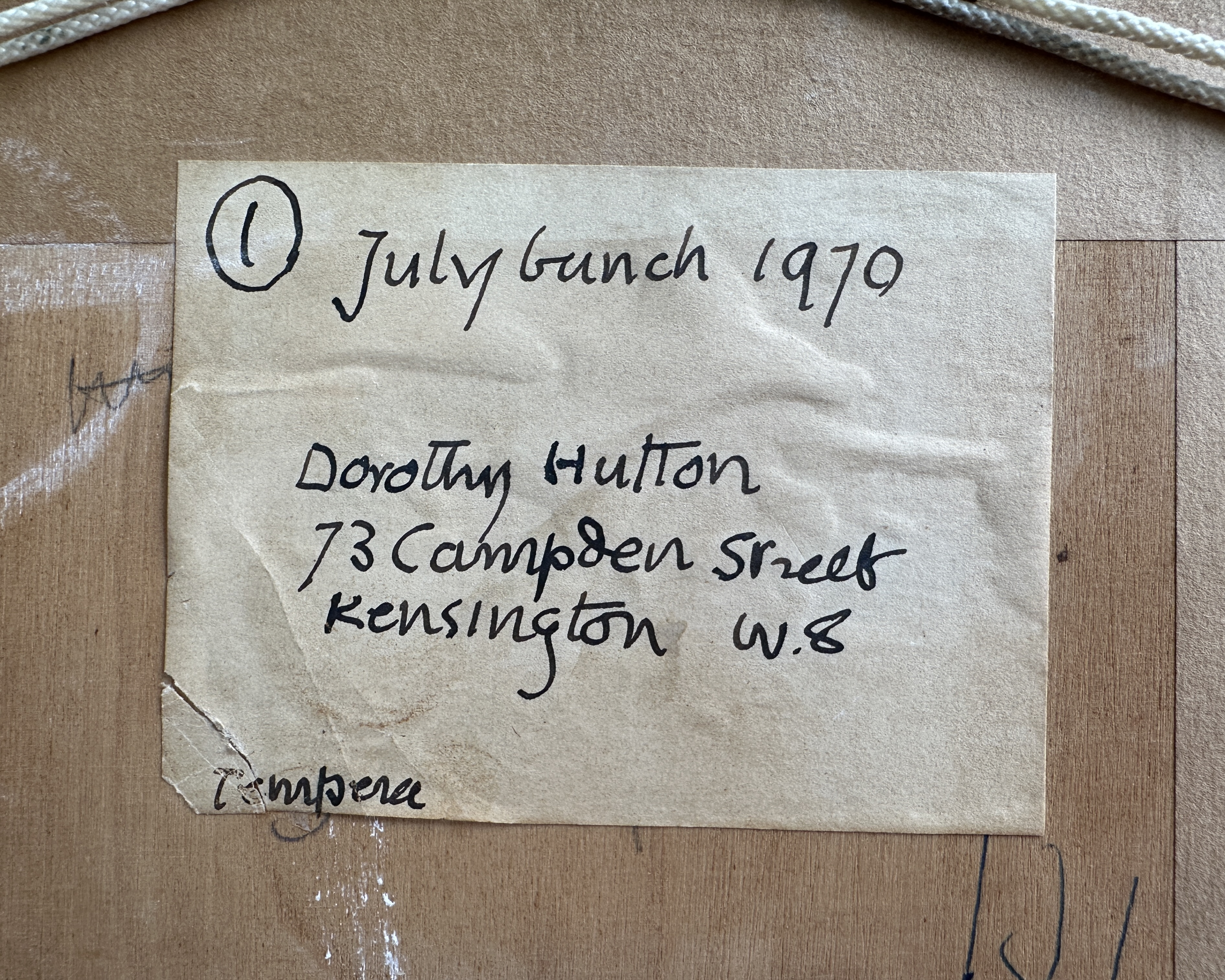
Example artwork label from back of frame, showing details of Dorothy Hutton's tempera painting July Bunch, 1970

=== Calligraphic works (partial list) ===
- Barclays Bank Roll of Honour
- Metropolitan Police Roll of Honour
- Record for the Honourable Company of Master Mariners
- War Record, RAF Coastal Command
- Fulham Roll of Honour of the Great War
- Queen's University Belfast Roll of Honour
- 'On the Coming Marriage of Her Royal Highness, The Princess Elizabeth' (1947) by poet laureate John Masefield
- 'On the Silver Wedding of Their Majesties The King and Queen' (1948) by poet laureate John Masefield
- BBC Radio Circle – various designs
- Heraldic Record of the Orders, Decorations and Medals of Winston Churchill

=== Essays ===
- 'Pigments and Media', The Calligrapher's Handbook (1956)
- 'Illumination and Decoration', The Calligrapher's Handbook (1956)

It is through constant and corageous attempts that some satisfactory results may be achieved. There is a vast field of enjoyment open to all. However simple the theme, if the decoration is descriptive, lively, fearless and sincere, it will be of interest and will enrich the text. — Dorothy Hutton, "Illumination and Decoration", The Calligrapher's Handbook (1956)

=== Paintings and prints (partial list) ===
Exhibited at the Royal Academy of Arts:

- Arch of Titus – lithograph (1923)
- Varzy – watercolour (1924)
- Market boats returning on Lago d'Iseo (1925)
- Santa Scolastica, Subiaco (1927)
- Urbino (1927)
- Piazza Campidoglio, Rome (1927)
- Roses – tempera (1930)
- June flowers – tempera (1930)
- Summer flowers – tempera (1931)
- Spring flowers (1933)
- Kensington Palace (1933)
- Mixed flowers – tempera (1934)
- Summer flowers – tempera (1934)
- City offices of Messrs Glyn, Mills & Co. – lithograph (1935)
- Mevagissey Harbour (1938)
- Summer Flowers – tempera (1940)
- Harbour, Mevagissey (1940)
- Spring bunch – tempera (1942)
- A fellside cottage (1942)
- Great Coxwell barn (1943)
- Flowers in May – tempera (1943)
- July flowers – tempera (1944)
- June flowers – tempera (1944)
- September flowers – tempera (1945)
- Roses – tempera (1945)
- Roses and snapdragon – tempera (1945)
- Cartmel (1945)
- Lymington (1947)
- Spring – tempera (1947)
- Summer – tempera (1947)
- Summer rose – tempera (1948)
- Japanese anemones – tempera (1948)
- Yarmouth, Isle of Wight (1948)
- A Summer Bunch – tempera (1949)
- Auriculas – tempera (1949)
- Westminster Abbey (1949)
- June 1949 – tempera (1950)
- Sept. 1949 – tempera (1950)
- Looking North from Yarmouth, Isle of Wight (1950)
- Cotswold Flowers – tempera (1951)
- Camellias at Kew – tempera (1952)
- Christmas Roses (1954)
- Summer Roses, 1953 – tempera (1954)
- Custom House, King's Lynn (1954)
- White Peonies – tempera (1955)
- Summer bunch, 1954 – tempera (1955)
- September's Bunch – tempera (1956)
- Flowers in May – tempera (1956)
- Rosa Dupontii (1957)
- Camellias – tempera (1958)
- San Cimignano – chalk, pen and wash (1958)
- Boule de Neige (1958)
- Flowers in May – tempera (1959)
- Rose Charles de Mills (1959)
- Westminster Abbey (1959)
- Rose "Fantin Latour" (1960)
- Urbino – pen, wash and chalk (1960)
- Flowers in a Bowl – tempera (1961)
- Roses: Alba Maxima (1962)
- Campo San Zanipolo (1962)
- Camellias – tempera (1963)
- Canterbury (1963)
- Seated Figure (1964)
- Camellias, 1964 – tempera (1965)
- Felicite Parmentier – watercolour (1965)
- Camellias – tempera (1967)
- Siena from the Gran' Loggia – pen and wash (1968)
- Shrub Roses in June – tempera (1968)
- Camellias, 1968 (1969)
- Salisbury (1969)
- July Bunch, 1969 (1970)
- A February Bunch (1971)
- Camellias, 1971 – tempera (1972)
- Garden Flowers: August, 1971 (1972)
- August, 1972 – tempera (1973)
- From my Garden – tempera (1974)
- A May Day – tempera (1974)
- My London Garden – tempera (1975)
- Camellias in Blue Bowl – tempera (1975)
- Happy Family – tempera (1976)
- Five Camellias – tempera (1976)
- A Summer's Vase – tempera (1977)
- Camellias from a Garden – tempera (1977)
- Spring – tempera (1978)
- Midsummer – tempera (1978)
- Camellias in a Glass Bowl – tempera (1979)
- An August Bunch – tempera (1979)
- A Cool September – tempera (1980)
- Summer in London – tempera (1980)
- Blue Bowl of Summer Flowers – tempera (1981)
- A Conference of Birds – tempera (1982)
- August Flowers – tempera (1982)
- Camellias – tempera (1983)
- The Cottage Interior – tempera (1983)
- Cats – tempera (1984)
