= Coxwell =

Coxwell may refer to any of the following:

== Places ==
- Coxwell Avenue, a street in Toronto, Canada
  - Coxwell (TTC), a subway station in Toronto
- Great Coxwell, a village in Berkshire, England
  - Great Coxwell Barn
- Little Coxwell, a village in Berkshire, England

== People ==
- Henry Tracey Coxwell (1819-1900), an English aeronaut
