= Norah Braden =

British artisan potter (1901–2001)

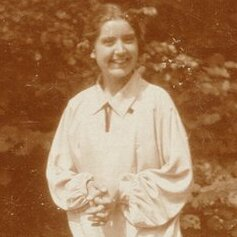
- Born: 19 July 1901; Margate
- Alma mater: Central School of Art and Design; Royal College of Art
- Occupation: Artist
- Employer: Camberwell College of Arts (–1957); University of Brighton School of Art (–1957)
- Partner(s): Katherine Pleydell-Bouverie

Norah Braden (1901 – 2001) was a British artisan potter.

== Life ==
Braden was born in 1901 in Margate. Her parents were Jessie Norwood (born Arnold) and John Templeton Braden who dealt in stationary. She showed early musical and artistic talent and she excelled on the violin. She could have gone to the Royal College of Music but she decided instead to go to Central School of Arts and Crafts. Her father had a bookshop and was a lay preacher, and they were not rich.

She went on to the Royal College of Art where she decided that she should abandon fine art and concentrate on pottery for financial reasons. She started a life-long friendship with the designer Enid Marx (who became very successful after failing the course). It was Braden who introduced her to Phyllis Barron and Dorothy Larcher and Marx became an apprentice handblock textile printer.

In 1925, Braden joined Bernard Leach's pottery in St. Ives after Sir William Rothenstein recommended her as "a genius". Fellow apprentice artisans at the Leach Pottery around that time were Michael Cardew, Shoji Hamada, Katherine Pleydell-Bouverie and the Japanese artisan kiln builder Tsuronosuke Matsubayashi.

In 1925, Pleydell-Bouverie started her first pottery with a wood-fired kiln in the grounds of her family estate at Coleshill. Braden joined her there and they had an intimate relationship. They used ash glazes, prepared from wood and home grown vegetables. Tsurunosuke Matsubayashi had built a two-chambered, wood fired, kiln there. The kiln would only be used a few times a year as it used two tonnes of timber to fire it for the 36 hours required. Whilst the kiln was being fired the potters had to watch it around the clock in makeshift beds to obtain the long slow firing they desired.

Braden had to leave to care for her mother after eight years but she would return for holidays to Coleshill.

She would teach at Camberwell College of Arts and the University of Brighton School of Art until she retired in 1957. She had rheumatoid arthritis and she was known for being reclusive. She had to join a retirement home in 1994 and visitors were surprised to find that she had a collection of unknown finished pots. She died in 2001 in Bosham in Sussex.

The Victoria and Albert have a collection of her pots from the 1930s.
