= Broad Campden =

Village in Gloucestershire, England

Coordinates: 52.03°N 01.78°W

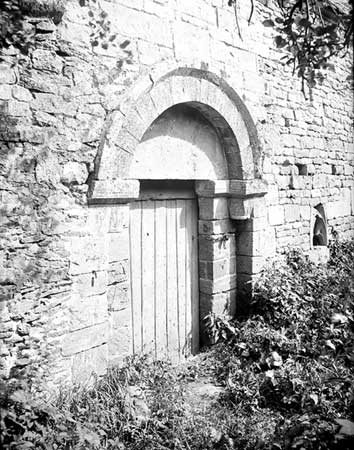
- Norman Chapel House; doorway

- Location within Gloucestershire
- OS grid reference: SP1537
- Shire county: Gloucestershire
- Region: South West
- Country: England
- Sovereign state: United Kingdom
- Post town: CHIPPING CAMPDEN
- Postcode district: GL55
- Dialling code: 01386
- Police: Gloucestershire
- Fire: Gloucestershire
- Ambulance: South Western

Broad Campden is a small village in Gloucestershire, England, with a church and pub, and notable for its beauty and fine walking trails.

== History ==
The village is the site of the listed partly 12th-century Norman Chapel House that was renovated by C. R. Ashbee for the art historian Ananda Coomaraswamy and his wife, the hand weaver, Ethel (later Ethel Mairet) from 1905 to 1907. It was the home of the Arts & Crafts Essex House Press from 1907 and Ashbee lived there from 1911.

== Population ==
In the 18th century there were 54 houses and just over 250 inhabitants; by 1971 there were over seventy houses but only 137 inhabitants.

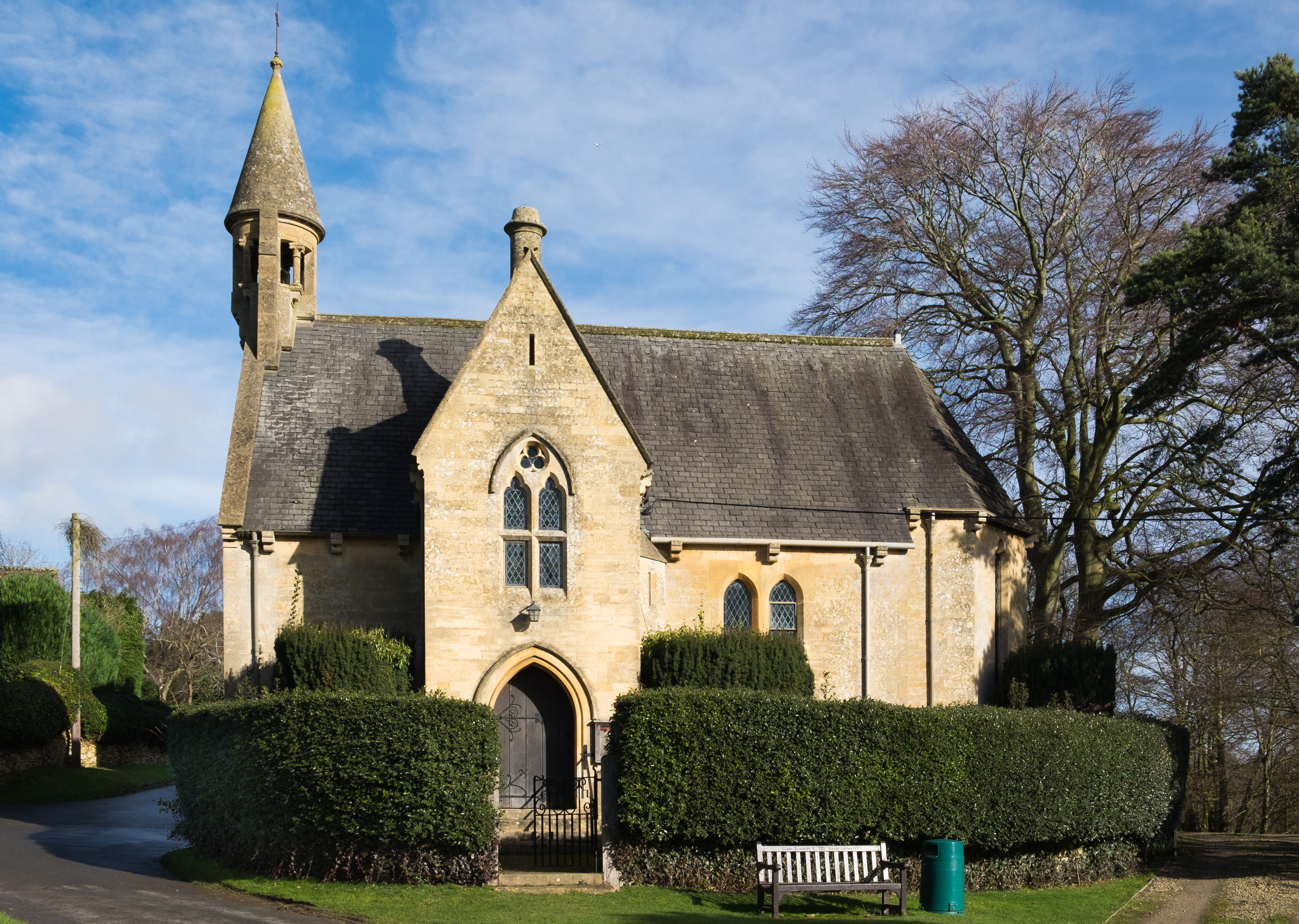
Church of St Michael and All Angels

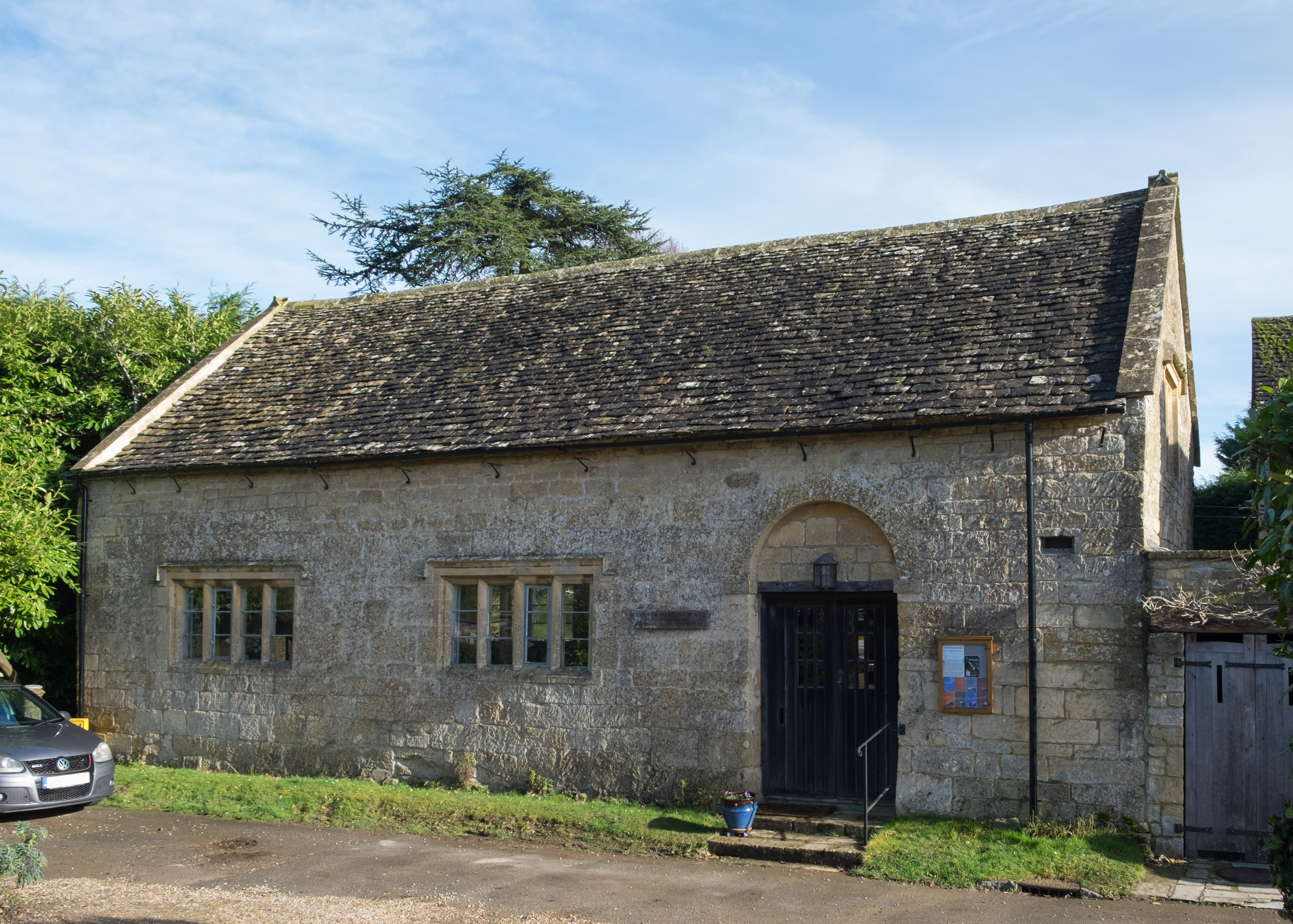
17th-century Quaker Meeting House (filming location for Father Brown)
