= Guild and School of Handicraft =

Former Arts and Crafts workshop in Chipping Camden, England

Coordinates: 52°02′56″N 1°47′00″W

The Guild and School of Handicraft was established in 1888 in London, later moving to Chipping Campden in Gloucestershire, England, as a community of artists and craftspeople by the arts and crafts architect Charles Robert Ashbee (1863-1942). According to Historic England it "became one of the foremost Arts and Crafts workshops of its period .. formed the focus of the communal life which, as a pioneering social experiment, formed the most bold and important expression of Arts and Crafts principles".

== Objective ==
The guild was a craft co-operative modelled on the medieval guilds and intended to give working men satisfaction in their craftsmanship. Many of the members were socialists. Skilled craftsmen, working on the principles of John Ruskin and William Morris, were to produce hand-crafted goods and manage a school for apprentices. The idea was greeted with enthusiasm by almost everyone except Morris, who was by now involved with promoting socialism and thought Ashbee's scheme trivial. The School attached to the Guild taught crafts. According to the Chipping Campden History Society, the movement "focused on handmade objects, reacting against the rapidly growing dominance of machinery which resulted in the loss of craft skills". The Guild operated as a co-operative, and its stated aim was:

To seek not only to set a higher standard of craftsmanship, but at the same time, and in so doing, to protect the status of the craftsman. To this end it endeavours to steer a mean between the independence of the artist— which is individualistic and often parasitical— and the trade-shop, where the workman is bound to purely commercial and antiquated traditions, and has, as a rule, neither stake in the business nor any interest beyond his weekly wage.

== Established in London ==
From 1888 to 1902 the guild prospered, employing about 50 men. Ashbee set up the Guild and School of Handicraft in 1888 in London, while a resident at Toynbee Hall, one of the original settlements set up to alleviate inner city poverty, in this case, in the slums of Whitechapel. The fledgling venture was first housed in temporary space but by 1890 had workshops at Essex House, Mile End Road, in the East End, with a retail outlet in the heart of the West End in fashionable Brook Street, Mayfair, more accessible to the Guild's patrons. The School closed in 1895, which Ashbee blamed on "the failure of the Technical Education Board of the L.C.C. to keep its word with the School Committee and the impossibility of carrying on costly educational work in the teeth of state aided competition." The following year the L.C.C. opened the Central School of Arts and Crafts. One of Ashbee's pupils in Mile End was Frank Baines, later Sir Frank, who was enormously influential in keeping Arts and Crafts alive in 20th-century architecture.

== Move to Chipping Campden ==
In 1902 Ashbee relocated the guild out of London to begin an experimental community in the old silk mill in Sheep Street, Chipping Campden in the picturesque Cotswolds in Gloucestershire. The guild at first flourished at Chipping Camden, where a sympathetic community provided local patrons. However the market for craftsman-designed furniture and metalwork was saturated by 1905 and the Guild was liquidated in 1907. Some craftsmen stayed, contributing to the tradition of modern craftsmanship in the area. The "Centre for Crafts" at Chipping Campden offers a permanent exhibition of their work.

== Style of products ==
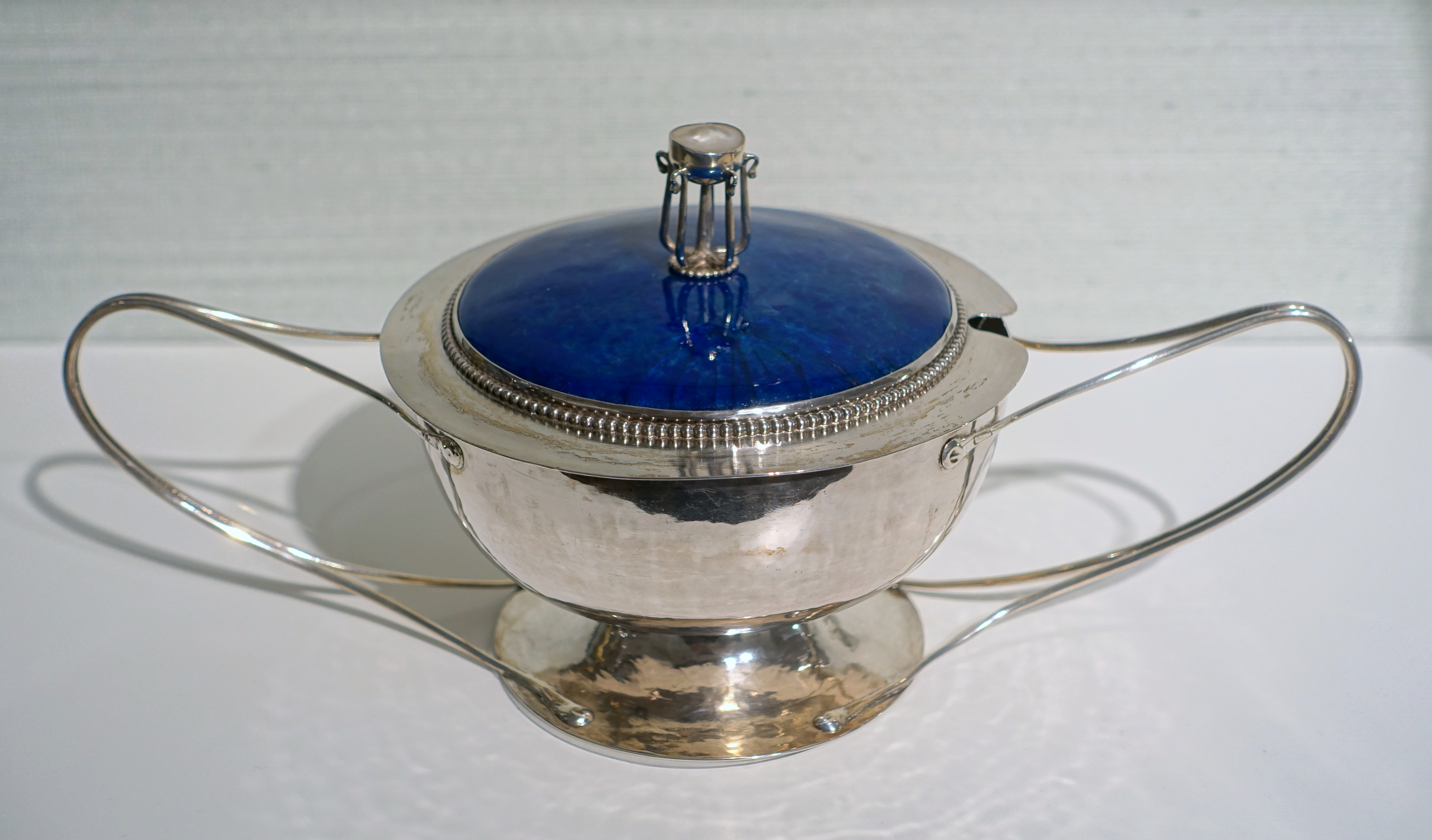
Covered bowl, designed by Ashbee, 1900

The guild's work is characterized by plain surfaces of hammered silver, flowing wirework and colored stones in simple settings. Ashbee himself often designed objects to be made of silver and other metals: belt buckles, jewellery, cutlery and tableware, for example. The Guild of Handicraft specialised in metalworking, producing jewellery and enamels as well as hand-wrought copper and wrought ironwork, and furniture. A widely illustrated suite of furniture was made by the Guild to designs of M. H. Baillie Scott for Ernest Louis, Grand Duke of Hesse at Darmstadt.

== Members ==
People associated with the Guild included:

- Frank Baines
- Charles Robert Ashbee
- John Pearson (artist)
- Frederick James Partridge
- Ethel Mairet
- F. L. Griggs
- H. J. Massingham
- Ananda Coomaraswamy (husband of Ethel Mairet)
