= Great Coxwell Barn =

Medieval tithe barn in Great Coxwell, Oxfordshire, England

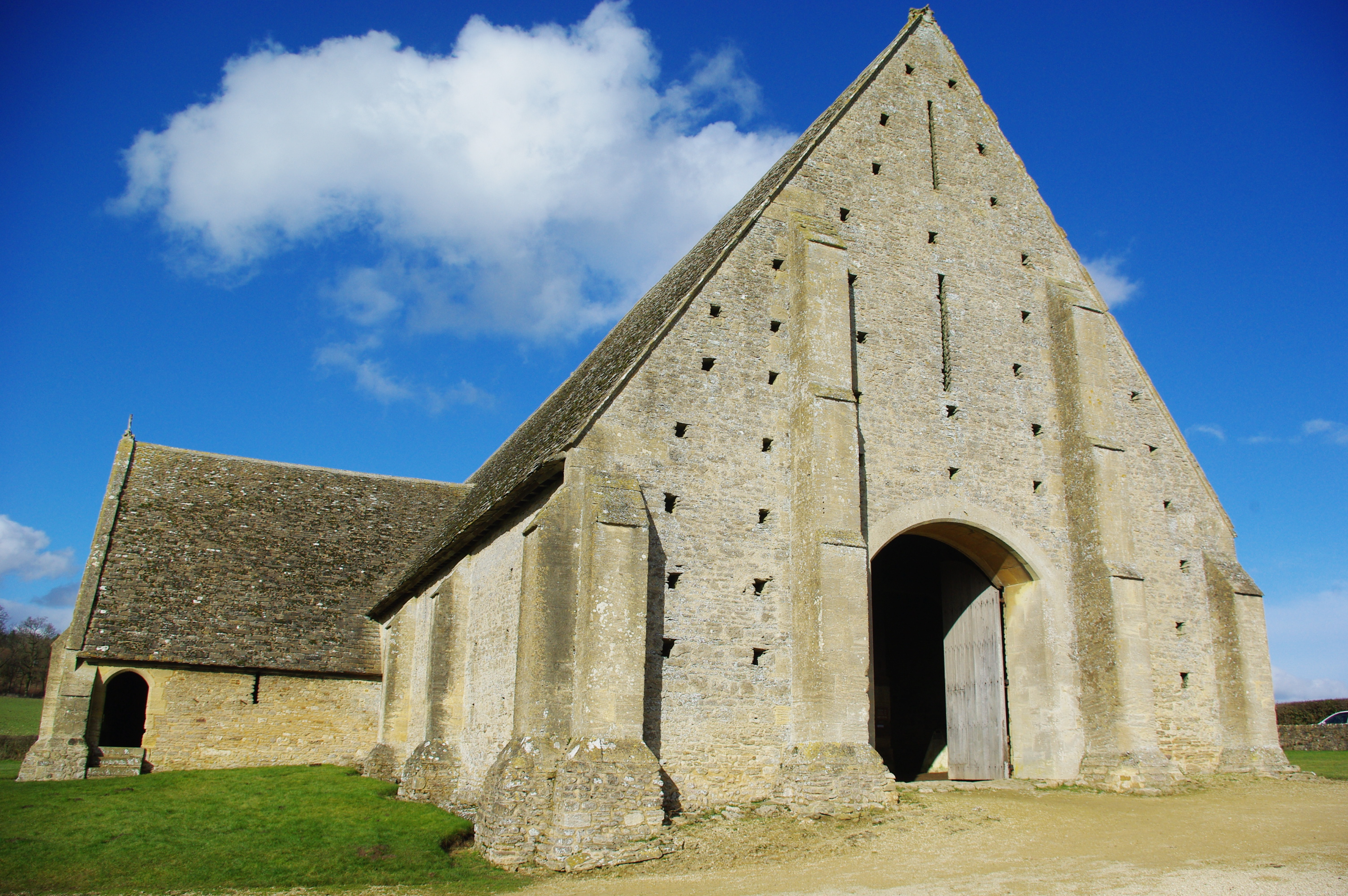
- The barn from the south

- Location within Oxfordshire
- Alternative names: Great Coxwell Great Barn; Great Coxwell Tithe Barn

General information
- Status: preserved, no longer in agricultural use
- Type: porch barn
- Architectural style: Gothic
- Location: Great Coxwell, Great Coxwell, Oxfordshire SN7 7LZ
- Coordinates: 51.64434°N 1.61279°W
- Elevation: 377 feet (115 m)
- Completed: c.1292; 734 years ago
- Client: Beaulieu Abbey, Hampshire
- Owner: National Trust

Height
- Height: 48 feet (15 m)

Dimensions
- Other dimensions: length 152 feet (46 m) width 43 feet (13 m)

Technical details
- Material: Cotswold stone walls Timber posts and roof frame Stonesfield slate roof
- Floor area: 5,502 square feet (511 m^{2})

Design and construction
- Designations: Grade I listed building Scheduled Ancient Monument

Other information
- Parking: small lay-by outside

Website
- Great Coxwell Barn

Great Coxwell Barn is a Medieval tithe barn at Great Coxwell, Oxfordshire (formerly Berkshire), England. It is on the northern edge of the village of Great Coxwell, which is about 9 miles (14 km) northeast of Swindon in neighbouring Wiltshire.

The barn was built about 1292 for the Cistercian Beaulieu Abbey in Hampshire, which had held the manor of Great Coxwell since 1205. Since 1956 it has been in the care of the National Trust.

The barn has been a Grade I listed building since 1966 and is also a Scheduled Ancient Monument.

== Building ==
Great Coxwell was a large manor, which the Domesday Book of 1086 recorded as 20 hides. In 1205 King John granted the manor to Beaulieu Abbey.

When the Cistercian Beaulieu Abbey in Hampshire was founded in 1204–05, King John endowed it with a group of manors that were headed by Great Faringdon and included Great Coxwell. Beaulieu retained the manors until 1538, when it surrendered all its properties to the Crown in the Dissolution of the Monasteries.

The Abbey seems to have had the barn built about 1292. Dendrochronology has established that some of the timbers in the roof of the barn were felled in the winter of 1291–92, and building with unseasoned timber was then common practice. Other timbers were felled earlier, from 1253 onwards.

The barn is built of Cotswold stone, with rubblestone walls and ashlar buttresses. The roof has a timber frame, borne on pairs of timber posts and surfaced with Stonesfield slate. In the main part of the barn are six pairs of posts, meaning that it has east and west aisles and seven bays. The west porch has one pair of timber posts and is of two bays. The architectural historian Sir Nikolaus Pevsner considered the interior to be the finest of any barn in England.

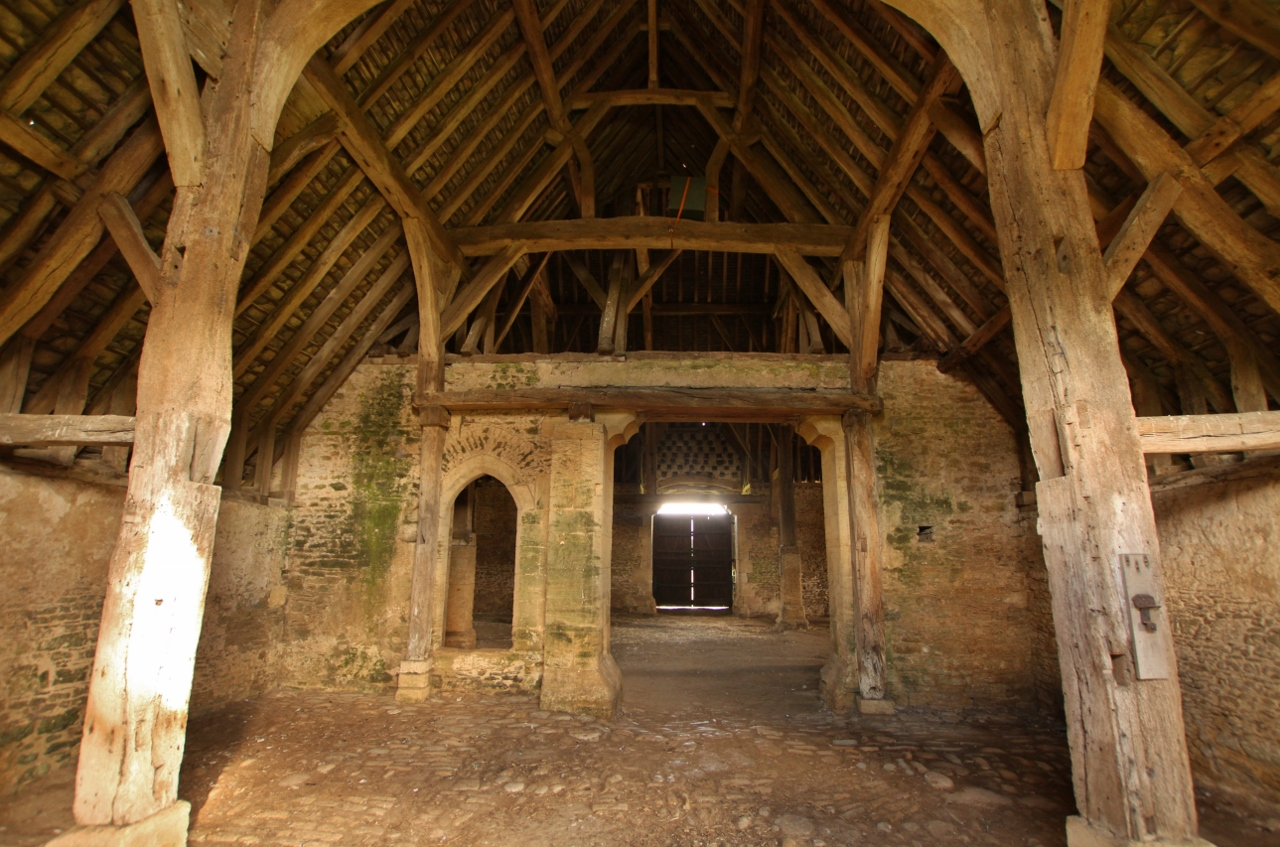
Inside the west porch, looking east toward the main part of the barn

The barn is 152 feet (46 m) long, 43 feet (13 m) wide and its roof ridge is 48 feet (15 m) high. It is aligned almost north–south, with a large west porch and much smaller east porch. An internal wall partly separates the west porch from the main body of the barn. As originally built, each porch had a door large enough for wagons; the west porch had also a small south door and the main barn had small doors in its north and south walls. In the centre of the barn is a threshing floor on which grain was threshed by hand with flails, with the large east and west doors open for a through draught to separate the grain from the chaff.

The barn was part of a monastic grange. It stored most, if not all, of the crop of the grange and received tithes from peasant tenants who were obliged to render a tenth of their crop to the abbey. These tithes were recorded by a clerk called a granger, whose office was in the west porch.

== After the dissolution of the abbey ==
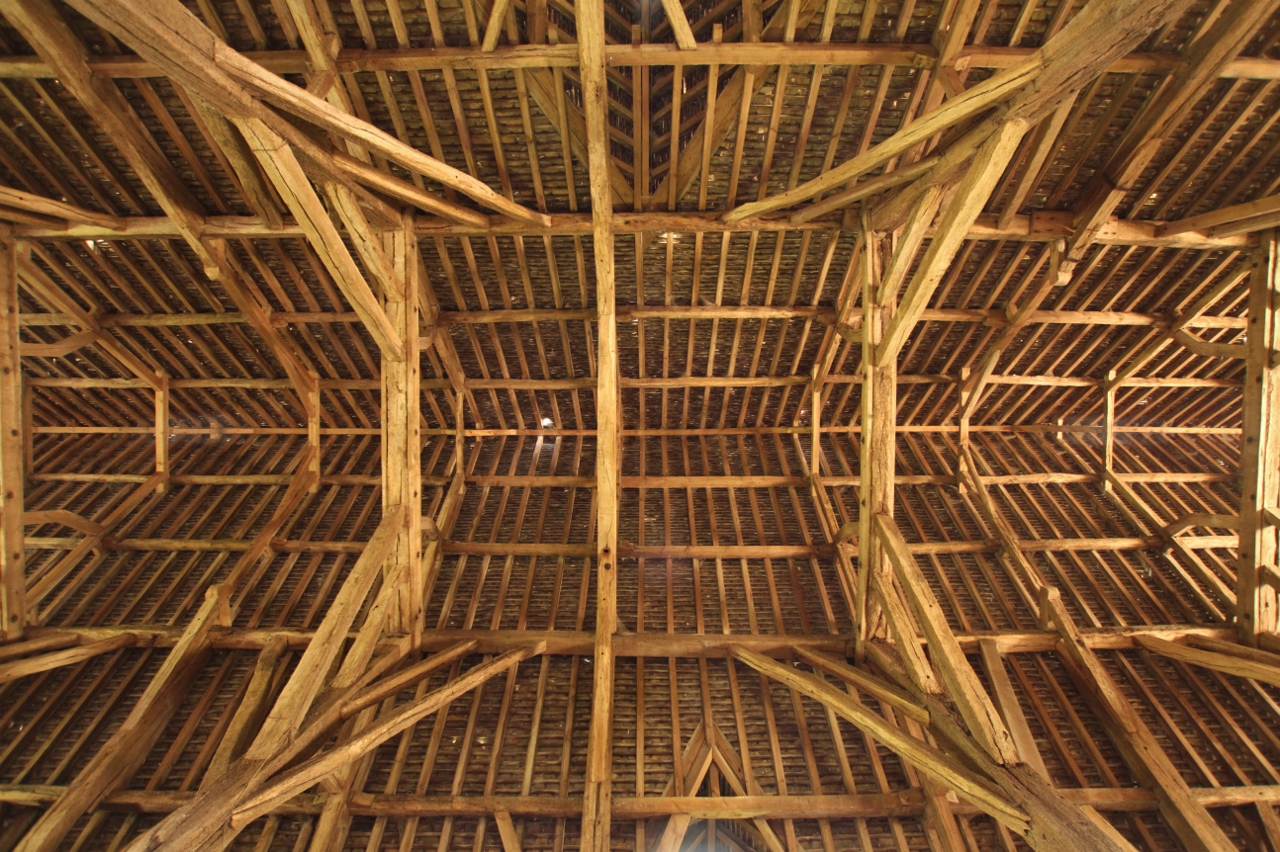
The centre of the roof, from below

In 1538 Beaulieu Abbey was dissolved and its estates were seized by the Crown. In 1540 the Crown sold the manor of Great Coxwell to a local landowner, William Morys (or Morris). The Morris family held the estate until 1638 when it was sold to George Pratt, who already held the neighbouring estate of Coleshill. The Pratt family held both Great Coxwell and Coleshill estates until 1700, when they were sold to George Pratt Richmond, also known as Webb. The estate was still in the Webb family early in the 19th century.

In the 18th century the large west doorway was bricked up and the west porch was converted into a stable. South of the barn a brick-built cart shed with a first-floor hay-loft or granary was added to the farmyard. In the 19th century mechanical threshing superseded manual threshing, so the barn's threshing floor lost its original purpose. The small doorways in the north and south gable walls were replaced with ones large enough for wagons. Other buildings were added to the surrounding farmyard.

From 1871 William Morris (1834–96) rented Kelmscott Manor, 6 miles (10 km) north of Great Coxwell. He called the barn "as noble as a cathedral" and brought many of his guests to see it.

Ernest Cook (1865–1955) acquired numerous estates including Coleshill. Cook left his estates to the National Trust, which thus has owned the barn since 1956. Most of the modern farm buildings around the barn were demolished. In 1961 the Trust treated the timbers against deathwatch beetle and extensively restored the roof.

== Access ==
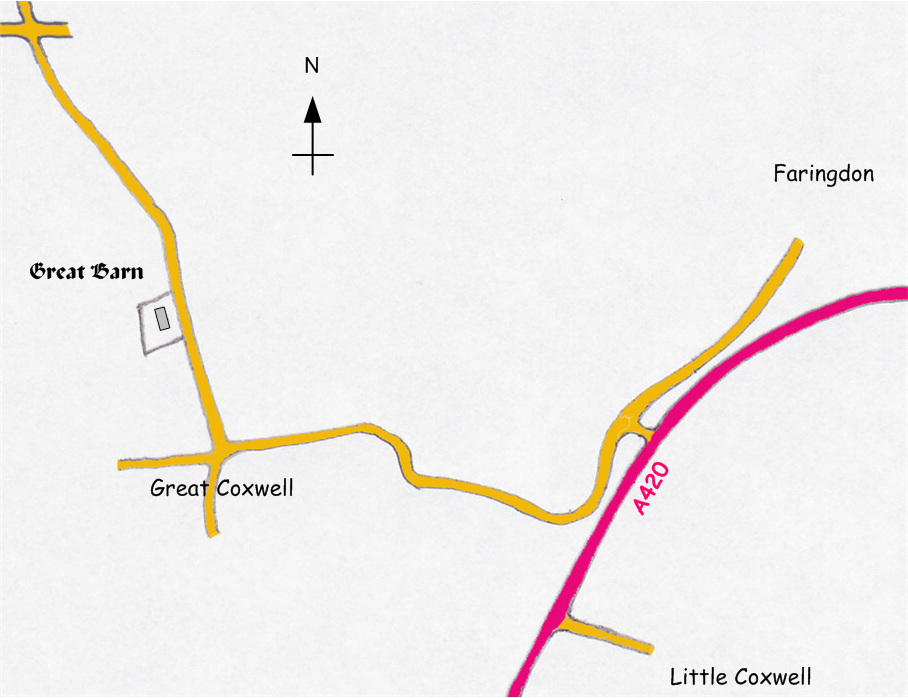
Sketch map of Great Coxwell

The barn is open to the public daily from dawn to dusk. Just outside the farmyard is a lay-by large enough for a small number of visitors' cars to be parked. Great Coxwell can be reached by Stagecoach West Gold bus route 66 from Swindon, Oxford and Faringdon. Buses run generally every 20 minutes from Mondays to Saturdays and every 30 minutes on Sundays. The nearest stop is just off the main A420 road, about 0.6 miles (1 km) from the barn.

== Sources ==
- Page, W. H.; Ditchfield, P. H., eds. (1924). "Parishes: Great Coxwell". A History of the County of Berkshire. Victoria County History. Vol. IV. assisted by John Hautenville Cope. London: The St Catherine Press.
- Pevsner, Nikolaus (1966). Berkshire. The Buildings of England. Harmondsworth: Penguin Books. pp. 28, 147–148.
