= Frederick James Partridge =

Frederick James Partridge (1877–1945) (known as Fred Partridge, works signed "FJP") was an English jeweller, silversmith and teacher of jewellery making, active circa 1901–1930. His works are in the Art Nouveau style. He has been called the "British René Lalique".

== Origins ==
He was born in Barnstaple, North Devon, the son of David Partridge (a pharmacist) and his wife Mary Ann Hunt. His elder sister Ethel Mairet (1872-1952) (née Partridge) was a notable weaver, textile designer and dyer who wrote several books on hand-weaving.

== Career ==
He studied at Birmingham Municipal School of Art where he shared lodgings with Henry Payne, painter and stained glass designer. After two years (c.1907-9) teaching at the Camberwell School of Art in London and spending time at the Barnstaple Guild of Metalwork and at the Guild and School of Handicraft in Chipping Campden, Gloucestershire (established as a community of artists and craftspeople by the arts and crafts architect Charles Robert Ashbee), where his sister Ethel also studied, he established himself as an artist and art jeweller, at some time before 1911 and worked from a studio in Dean Street, London. Amongst his clients was the department store Liberty & Co in Regent Street, London.

== Marriage ==
His wife, May Hart Partridge (born c.1881 in Harborne, Staffordshire - died 1917), was an art enameller who studied at the Birmingham School of Art. She was "the most notorious pupil of Arthur Gaskin". Her works are mainly in the Arts and Crafts style. She later worked at London County Council schools and at home.

== Works ==
Two of Fred Partridge's works from 1928 are in the collection of the Victoria and Albert Museum in London, a brooch (M.14-1976) and a ring (M.15-1976), the latter of silver set with a baguette amethyst, made for his daughter Joan. A brooch (c.1930) (1981M400) is in the Birmingham Museums and Art Gallery.
