= Heather Child =

English calligrapher & artist (1911–1997)

- Born: 3 November 1911; Winchester, England
- Died: 18 June 1997 (aged 85); Petersfield, England
- Occupations: Calligrapher, heraldic artist, botanical illustrator, author

Heather Josephine Child (3 November 1911 – 18 June 1997) was an English calligrapher, heraldic artist, botanical illustrator and author.

== Biography ==
Child was born in Winchester, the daughter of Francis Child, a doctor. She was the great-niece of the social reformer Josephine Butler. She studied at the Chelsea School of Art in London, and while at college was elected a member of the Society of Scribes and Illuminators, and three years later of the Arts & Crafts Exhibition Society. Her artistic career was interrupted by World War II, which she spent in Dorset with the Red Cross blood transfusion unit that she founded.

Her work was part of the painting event in the art competition at the 1948 Summer Olympics.

She returned to London in the late 1940s, and among many commissions, illustrated the Collins Pocket Guide to Wild Flowers, produced designs for the arms of the city guilds for the St Paul's Cathedral information centre in London, and various maps. This led to her first book, Decorative Maps, in 1956, and many other publications followed, including Heraldic Design, three editions of Calligraphy Today and her completion of Formal Penmanship, an unfinished work by Edward Johnston, under whom she had studied.

She served on many committees of craft organisations, was the first chairman of the Society of Scribes and Illuminators, and was also chairman of the Crafts Advisory Committee and trustee of the Crafts Study Centre in Bath (now in Farnham, Surrey). She was awarded an MBE for services to calligraphy and the crafts in 1975.
