= Great Coxwell =

Village in Oxfordshire, England

Coordinates: 51.639°N 1.608°W

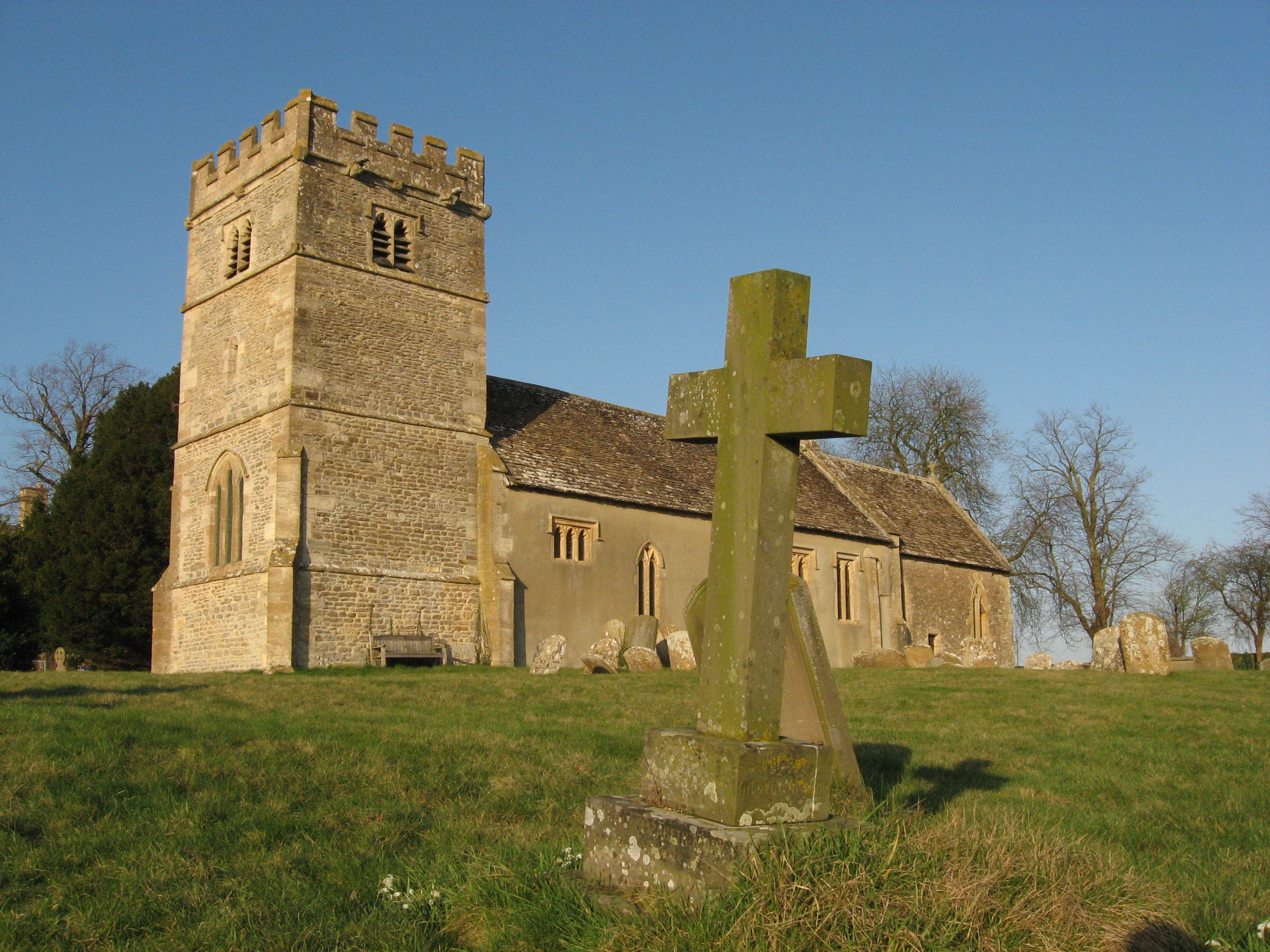
- St Giles' parish church seen from the southwest

- Location within Oxfordshire
- Population: 295 (2021 census)
- OS grid reference: SU270935
- Civil parish: Great Coxwell
- District: Vale of White Horse
- Shire county: Oxfordshire
- Region: South East
- Country: England
- Sovereign state: United Kingdom
- Post town: Faringdon
- Postcode district: SN7
- Dialling code: 01367
- Police: Thames Valley
- Fire: Oxfordshire
- Ambulance: South Central
- UK Parliament: Witney
- Website: Great Coxwell

Great Coxwell is a village and civil parish 2 miles (3 km) southwest of Faringdon in the Vale of White Horse, England. It was in Berkshire until the 1974 boundary changes transferred it to Oxfordshire. The 2021 census recorded the parish's population as 295 in 124 households.

== Topography ==
The parish is 2 1/4 miles (3.6 km) long north–south and slightly more than 1 1/2 miles (2.4 km) wide east–west. Part of its southern boundary is formed by a stream that flows west to join the River Cole south of Coleshill, about 1 mile (1.6 km) west of the parish. The stream runs in the bottom of a valley that runs roughly from east to west. Part of the parish's western boundary is formed by a brook that joins that stream. The southeast boundary was changed in the 20th century so that it follows the A420 road. Part of the northern boundary is in Badbury Forest. For the remainder the parish is bounded by field boundaries.

In 1924 the parish covered 1,435 acres (581 ha), but that was before the southeast boundary was revised. The parish's highest point is Badbury Hill (see below), which is just over 520 feet (160 m) high and is about 1 mile (1.6 km) northwest of the village. The lowest point is just over 279 feet (85 m) above sea level, at the southwest corner of the parish. The geology of much of the parish is Late Jurassic. Great Coxwell village is on Corallian Limestone beds between 330 feet (100 m) and 390 feet (120 m) above sea level. The land north of the village is on Kimmeridge Clay, Oxford Clay and Early Cretaceous Lower Greensand.

== Badbury Hill ==
Badbury Hill is in the north of the parish. On its summit is an Iron Age hill fort that was built about 600 BC. There is ancient woodland on its slopes. It is also known locally as Blue-Bell woods as in the Spring there is a protected carpet of bluebell flowers. The hill is in the care of the National Trust.

== Toponym ==
The Domesday Book of 1086 records the toponym as Cocheswelle. 13th- and 14th-century records call it Great Cokewell or Cokeswell. In 15th-century records it is Cokeswylle or Cokyswell. The earliest known record of the modern spelling Coxwell is from the 18th century. "Great" distinguishes the place from neighbouring Little Coxwell, whose village is 3/4 mile (1.2 km) east of Great Coxwell. The two parishes share a common boundary.

== Manor ==
The Domesday Book records that King Harold held the manor before the Norman Conquest of England. Great Coxwell was a large manor, which the Domesday Book of 1086 recorded as 20 hides. When the Cistercian Beaulieu Abbey in Hampshire was founded in 1204–05, King John endowed it with a group of manors that were headed by Great Faringdon and included Great Coxwell. The abbey retained the manors until 1538, when it was forced to surrender all its properties to the Crown in the dissolution of the monasteries. In 1540 the Crown sold the manor of Great Coxwell to a local landholder, William Morys (or Morris). Under Queen Elizabeth I the Morris family were recusants. In 1580 the Mass was secretly celebrated at Court House Farm in Great Coxwell. In 1581 Francis Morris, grandson of William Morys, was jailed in the Fleet Prison in London for sheltering the Jesuit priest Edmund Campion.

The Morris family held the estate until 1638 when it was sold to George Pratt, who already held the neighbouring estate of Coleshill. The Pratt family held both Great Coxwell and Coleshill estates until 1700, when they were sold to George Pratt Richmond, also known as Webb. The estate was still in the Webb family early in the 19th century. Some decades later Ernest Cook (1865–1955), grandson of the pioneer travel agent Thomas Cook, acquired numerous estates including Coleshill, and thus Great Coxwell. Cook left his estates to the National Trust.

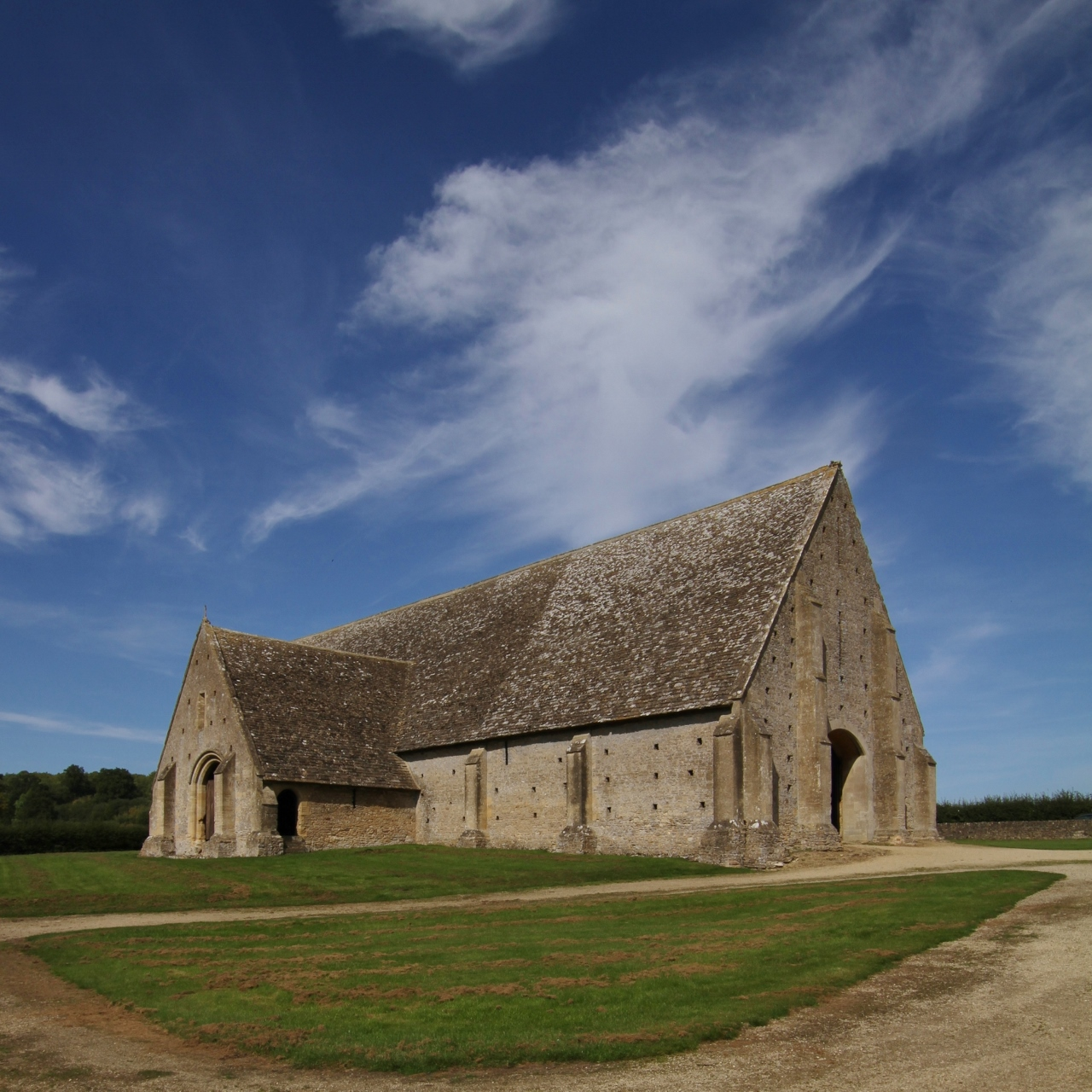
Great Coxwell Barn seen from the southwest

=== Great Coxwell Barn ===
On the northern edge of the village is a Medieval tithe barn that was built about 1292 for Beaulieu Abbey to store the crop of its monastic grange. It is a Grade I listed building and a Scheduled Ancient Monument. The barn is now owned by the National Trust, which has been restored and is open to the public.

== Parish church ==
The Church of England parish church of Saint Giles is on a ridge in the southern part of the village. Parts of the church date from about 1200. The west tower was added in the 15th century. The tower has a ring of five bells. Henry Bagley of Chacombe cast the treble, third and fourth bell in 1738. James Wells of Aldbourne, Wiltshire cast the second bell in 1824. Mears and Stainbank of the Whitechapel Bell Foundry cast the tenor bell in 1911. There is also a Sanctus bell that John Taylor cast in 1839, presumably at his then foundry in Oxford. The bells are currently unringable. The churchyard is now managed for wildlife. It has more than 100 species of wild flower, including wild clary, Salvia verbenaca.

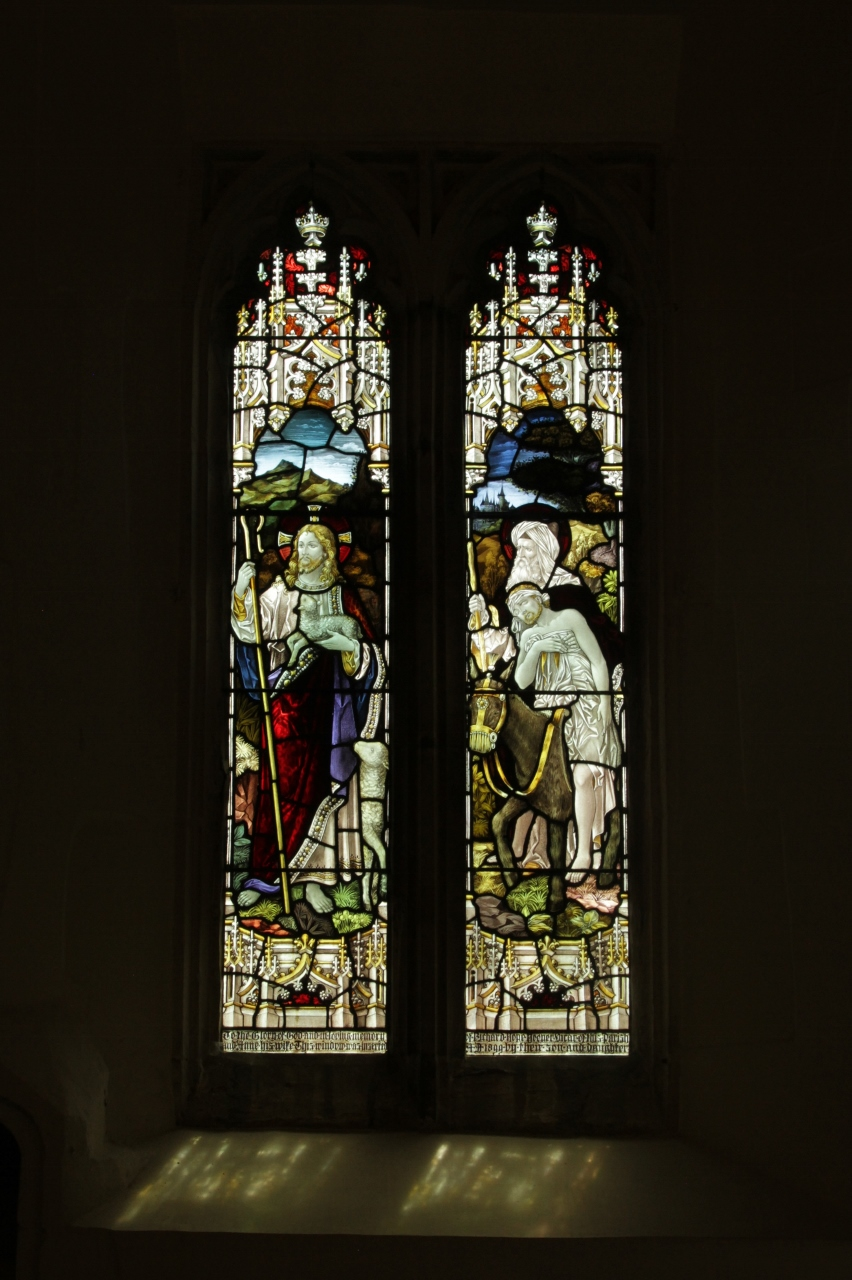
Gothic Revival stained glass window in St Giles' parish church in memory of Rev. John Hope Hooper, who served the parish 1878–99 first as curate and then as vicar

== Public transport ==
Stagecoach West Gold bus route S6 between Swindon and Oxford via Faringdon passes along the Coxwell Road between Faringdon and the A420 then east of the village on the A420 road. Buses run generally every 20 minutes from Mondays to Saturdays and every 30 minutes on Sundays. The nearest stops are at Little Coxwell Turn on the A420 (SU2763393552) and Great Coxwell Turn on the Coxwell Road (SU2777093885).

== Sources ==
- Arnold-Baker, Charles (1973). The Local Government Act 1972. London: Butterworth & Co.
- Ditchfield, PH; Page, WH, eds. (1907). "House of Cistercian monks: The cell or grange of Faringdon". A History of the County of Berkshire. Victoria County History. Vol. II. London: Archibald Constable & Co. pp. 81–82.
- Page, WH; Ditchfield, PH, eds. (1924). "Parishes: Great Coxwell". A History of the County of Berkshire. Victoria County History. Vol. IV. London: St Catherine Press. pp. 487–489.
- Pevsner, Nikolaus (1966). Berkshire. The Buildings of England. Harmondsworth: Penguin Books. pp. 147–148.
