= Crafts Study Centre =

Museum in Surrey, England

Coordinates: 51.2153°N 0.8047°W

The Crafts Study Centre is a university museum of modern crafts, located next to the entrance of the University for the Creative Arts at Farnham, Surrey.

The Crafts Study Centre holds collections of 20th and 21st century British craft, primarily in the fields of calligraphy and lettering, ceramics, furniture and wood, and textiles, but also has small collections of jewellery, works of art on paper, and other miscellaneous items. The object collections are accompanied by archives such as diaries, correspondence, photographs, catalogues and working notes from crafts practitioners and crafts organisations. In some cases the Centre also holds ‘source collections’, collected from around the world by makers for their own inspiration, enjoyment and knowledge.

Much of the collection has been built up from donations and bequests and includes work by Bernard Leach, Lucie Rie, and Hans Coper in ceramics, Ethel Mairet, Phyllis Barron and Dorothy Larcher in textiles; calligraphy by Edward Johnston and Irene Wellington, and furniture by Ernest Gimson and Edward Barnsley.

== History ==
The Centre was established in 1970 when a small group of crafts makers and educators agreed it was vital to preserve and celebrate the best British crafts of the 20th century. This included Muriel Rose, who became one of the founding trustees and donated her collections and archive to the Centre. The decision to establish the Crafts Study Centre led to a successful partnership with the University of Bath, which housed its collections at the city’s Holburne Museum of Art when the Centre first opened to the public in 1977. In 2000 the Crafts Study Centre relocated to Farnham in Surrey to accept the offer of what was then the Surrey Institute of Art & Design, University College, today the University for the Creative Arts, to construct a new purpose-built space. The Centre opened in a three-storey building in June 2004.

The Centre is a registered charity with a Board of Trustees, currently chaired by the potter and writer Alison Britton. It is an accredited museum as recognised by Arts Council England.

== Exhibitions and events ==
The Crafts Study Centre has a programme of exhibitions from both its permanent collections and of work by contemporary artists and makers. It also hosts talks, lectures, symposiums, open days, workshops and other events by artist-makers.

== Facilities ==
The Crafts Study Centre has a shop, which sells publications from its exhibitions present and past and other titles, alongside crafts magazines such as Ceramic Review and Selvedge. The shop also stocks work by makers from across the UK.

The Centre also has a Library with a collection of books and periodicals relating to craft, and a Research Room which is available to the public by appointment for dedicated research visits.
