= Katherine Pleydell-Bouverie =

English artist (1895–1985)

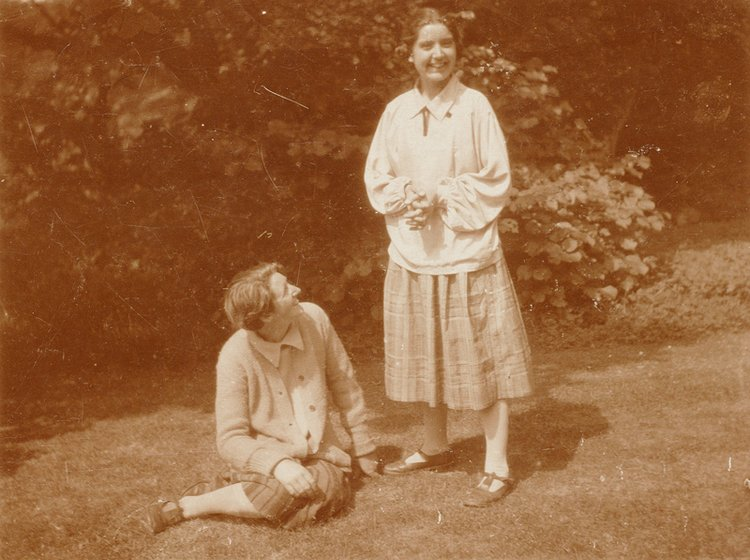
- Katharine Pleydell-Bouverie and Norah Braden at Coleshill House in 1929
- Born: 7 June 1895; Coleshill, Oxfordshire, England
- Died: January 1985 (age 89); Kilmington, Wiltshire, England

Katherine (sometimes known as Katharine) Harriot Duncombe Pleydell-Bouverie (7 June 1895 – 1985) was a pioneer in modern English studio pottery, known for her wood-ash glazes.

== Biography ==
Pleydell-Bouverie was born into an aristocratic family at the Coleshill estate near Faringdon, then in Berkshire. Her parents were Duncombe Pleydell-Bouverie and his wife Maria Eleanor, the daughter of Sir Edward Hulse, 5th Baronet; her paternal grandfather was Jacob Pleydell-Bouverie, 4th Earl of Radnor. Pleydell-Bouverie was the youngest of three children growing up in a 17th-century stately home surrounded by blue-and-white and famille verte Chinese porcelain. It was during childhood holidays playing on a muddy beach at Weston-super-Mare with her siblings that she was first introduced to clay.

She died at Kilmington, Wiltshire, in January 1985 at the age of 89.

== Career ==
Whilst living in London in the 1920s, her interest in pottery began when she visited Roger Fry at his Omega Workshops and saw examples of his work, which led to her attending evening classes at the Central School of Arts and Crafts in London to study pottery under Dora Billington.

In 1924, Pleydell-Bouverie was taken on by Bernard Leach at his pottery in St. Ives. She remained at the Leach Pottery for a year and learnt alongside Michael Cardew, Shoji Hamada and Tsuronosuke Matsubayashi (known as Matsu). She did the necessary odd jobs at the pottery whilst observing technical lectures from Matsu and was soon given the nickname of "Beano".

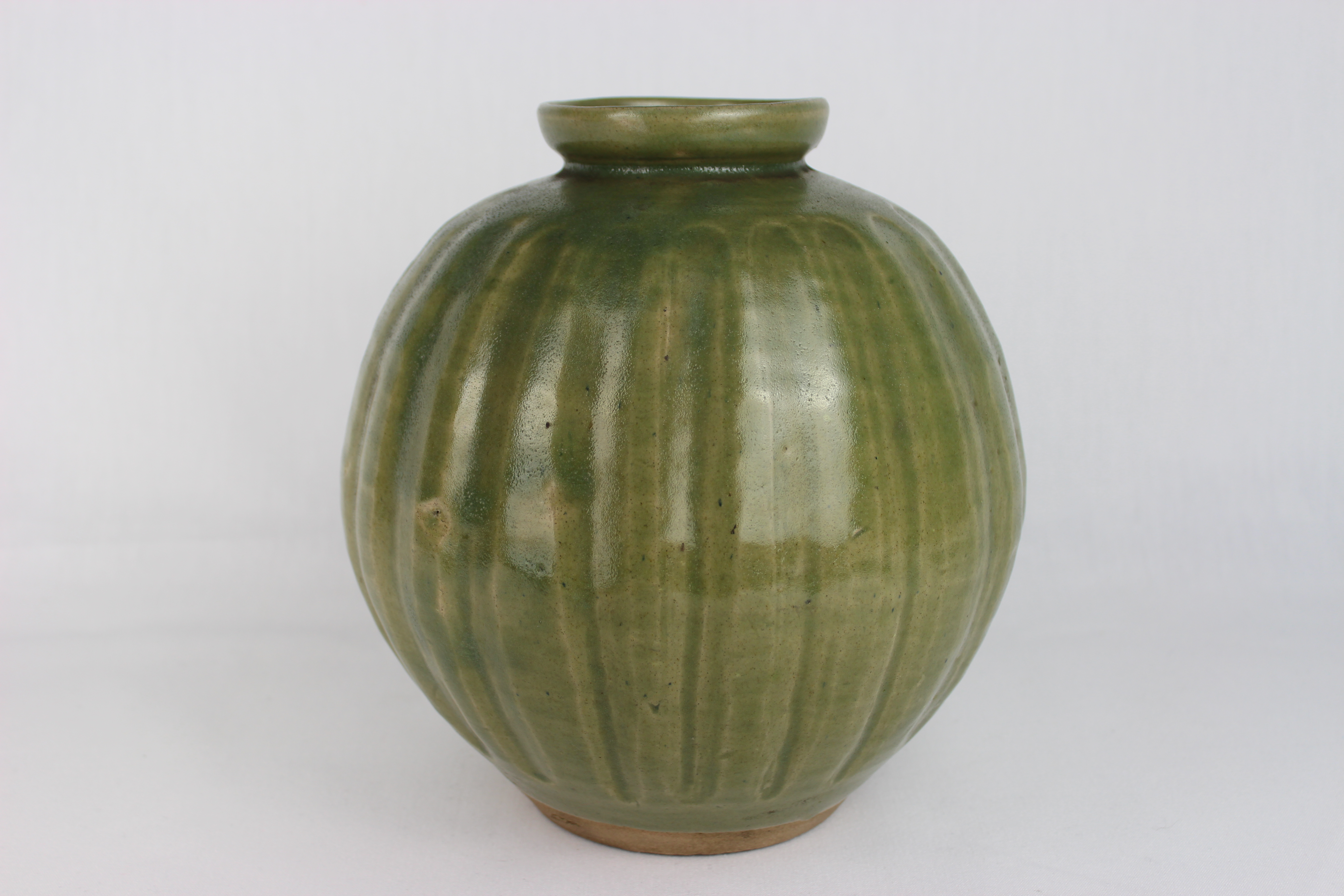
Untitled Fluted Jar by Katherine Pleydell-Bouverie from the W. A. Ismay collection at York Art Gallery

In 1925, Pleydell-Bouverie started her first pottery with a wood-fired kiln in the grounds of her family estate at Coleshill, where she was joined for eight years by fellow potter Norah Braden. They had an intimate relationship and although Norah had to leave to care for her mother she would return for holidays. They used ash glazes, prepared from wood and vegetables grown on the estate. Tsurunosuke Matsubayashi, a skilled Japanese kiln maker, had built a two chambered wood fired kiln there. The kiln could only be used a few times a year as it used two tonnes of timber to fire it for the 36 hours required. Whilst the kiln was being fired the potters had to watch it around the clock in makeshift beds to obtain the long slow firing they desired. In 1946, after the family sold Coleshill House, she moved to her second pottery, in a malthouse attached to the 17th-century manor house at Kilmington in Wiltshire, where she worked until her death in 1985. Here she used first an oil-fired kiln, and then an electric one.

After World War II, Pleydell-Bouverie sold her ceramic work at low prices, possibly because she had private means.

== Style, technique and reception ==
Pleydell-Bouverie described herself as "a simple potter. I like a pot to be a pot, a vessel with a hole in it, made for a purpose". In a letter to Bernard Leach written 29 June 1930, she said "I want my pots to make people think, not of the Chinese, but of things like pebbles and shells and birds' eggs and the stones over which moss grows. Flowers stand out of them more pleasantly, so it seems to me. And that seems to matter most."

Pleydell-Bouverie was judgmental of the aesthetic of some of her contemporaries such as Charles and Nell Vyse as too 'competently commercial' rather than evoking the appearances of 'things like pebbles and shells and birds' eggs'. She was also critical of Distributism as exemplified by The Guild of St Joseph and St Dominic saying 'I met a bunch of 'em the other day. They made me rather angry.' She was a member of the Red Rose Guild.

Pleydell-Bouverie's pots are functional and tend to have a style similar to Bronze Age English pottery. She trialled a wide range of vegetable and wood ash glazes for her stoneware pottery.
