= Little Coxwell =

Village in Oxfordshire, England

Coordinates: 51.639°N 1.595°W

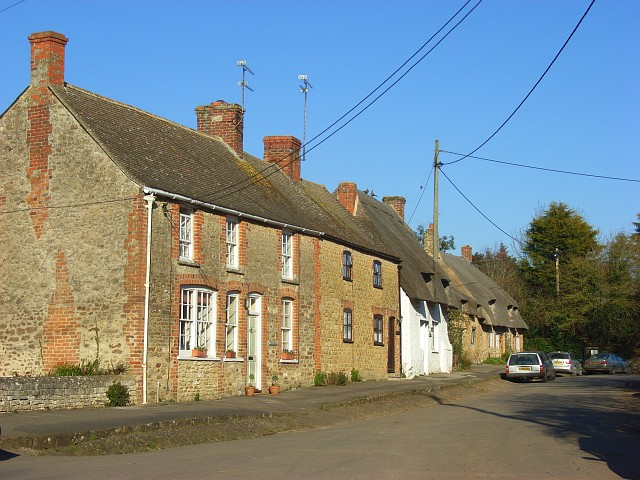
- Cottages in Little Coxwell

- Location within Oxfordshire
- Population: 132 (2001 census)
- OS grid reference: SU2893
- Civil parish: Little Coxwell
- District: Vale of White Horse
- Shire county: Oxfordshire
- Region: South East
- Country: England
- Sovereign state: United Kingdom
- Post town: Faringdon
- Postcode district: SN7
- Dialling code: 01367
- Police: Thames Valley
- Fire: Oxfordshire
- Ambulance: South Central
- UK Parliament: Witney
- Website: Welcome to Our Website

Little Coxwell is a village and civil parish in South East England, about 1.5 miles (2.4 km) south of Faringdon and 0.8 miles (1.3 km) east of Great Coxwell. Little Coxwell was part of Berkshire until the 1974 local government boundary changes transferred the Vale of White Horse to Oxfordshire. Cistercian monks of Beaulieu Abbey built the Church of England parish church of Saint Mary in the 12th century as a chapel of ease. Little Coxwell was a dependent chapelry of the ecclesiastical parish of Great Faringdon. In 1866 the civil parish was established. The village has a public house, the Eagle Tavern. The Hurlingham Polo Association, the governing body for polo in the UK, Ireland, and many other countries, has its office at Manor Farm, Little Coxwell.

The Vale Way long-distance walking route passes through the South of the village.
