= Enid Marx =

English painter and designer (1902–1998)

Enid Marx RDI
- Born: Enid Crystal Dorothy Marx; 20 October 1902; London, England
- Died: 18 May 1998 (aged 95); London, England
- Education: Roedean School, Central School of Arts and Crafts, Royal College of Art
- Known for: Graphic design
- Awards: Royal Designer for Industry (1944)

Enid Crystal Dorothy Marx, RDI (20 October 1902 – 18 May 1998), was an English painter and designer, best known for her industrial textile designs for the London Transport Board and the Utility Furniture Scheme. Marx was the first female engraver to be designated as a Royal Designer for Industry.

== Early life ==
Born in London to Annie Marie Neuberger and Robert Joseph Marx, Enid Marx was the youngest of three children. She was known familiarly throughout her life as "Marco". She was a distant cousin of Karl Marx.

Her father was a paper-making engineer, and Marx would later describe his work as a major influence on her interest in mass-produced design and popular art.

Her artistic inclinations were fostered from an early age, especially by her older sister Marguerite who lived in France for a period. As a young girl, she found pleasure in collecting samples of ribbon from textile shops. She travelled with her family in Europe before the First World War, witnessing the avant-garde arts movements of the early 20th century.

== Education ==
Marx first attended South Hampstead High School, after which her parents transferred her to Roedean School for girls from 1916 until 1921, and her artistic studies there included life drawing, printing, and carpentry. She studied at the Central School of Arts and Crafts for a year before moving to the painting school at the Royal College of Art (RCA) in 1922. Her classmates there included Edward Bawden, Eric Ravilious, Barbara Hepworth, Barnett Freedman. and she made a lifelong friend of the artisan potter Norah Braden. As a student, Marx was influenced by Paul Nash, then a tutor at the RCA, who introduced her to publishers and encouraged her avant-garde leanings. Marx failed her Final Diploma Assessment (led by Charles Ricketts) in 1925, and she left the school that year. Her work was judged to be "vulgar", reflecting her interest in popular forms and rejection of the traditional definition of fine arts. Nearly 60 years later, in 1982, the college awarded her an honorary degree.

== Career ==
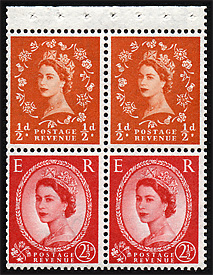
Top row: one of Marx's designs for the Wilding series of low-value stamps. The red stamps in the bottom row are a design by Michael Farrar-Bell.

Marx was a versatile artist whose work spanned industrial design and the visual arts. She valued craft and folk art, and derived inspiration for her work from her collections of vernacular artwork and everyday objects. Although she is best known for her textile and book design, she also designed wrapping paper, stamps, and Christmas cards.

=== Textile design ===
In 1925, after leaving school before finishing her degree, Marx went to work for the textile designers Phyllis Barron and Dorothy Larcher at their studio in Hampstead. In 1927 she started her own workshop where she designed and produced block-printed textiles, often making use of naturally derived dyes instead of new chemical methods. Her work was sold through the Little Gallery, off Sloane Street, and later at Cecilia Dunbar Kilburn's Dunbar Hay gallery. Collectors of her work included the actors Gerald du Maurier and Gertrude Lawrence.

==== Industrial textiles ====
In 1937 she was selected by the London Passenger Transport Board to design the moquette seat fabrics for use on the seats of London buses and tube trains. The new seat fabrics were part of a customer-experience centered redesign, spearheaded by Christian Barman and Frank Pick, focusing on interior fabrics and surfaces. The moquettes were designed to very specific standards, with patterns meant to hide wear and dirt but avoid the problem of "dazzle," their term for the potentially nauseating effects of a pattern in motion. Four of Marx's 13 original designs are known to have been produced as a part of this redesign, including a "shield" pattern that was used in the London Underground for decades. Marx later recalled in a lecture to other textile designers that ‘We all thought at first that the best way of disguising dirt was to use colours which would more or less tone in with the dirt’ but that ‘the best method of ensuring the seats would look clean after a period of use was to use strongly contrasting tones and rather brilliant color ’.

During the design and production process for these fabrics, Marx expressed displeasure with the manufacturing firms, who took liberties with the designs to conform to manufacturing requirements. Marx believed that time and effort could have been saved if the manufacturers had consulted with her before making the necessary modifications. The pattern used for the seats and interior backdrops was a geometric design in green and red.

In 1943, the furniture designer Gordon Russell invited her to become a member of the Board of Trade Utility Furniture Design Advisory Panel, which was tasked with implementing wartime austerity standards in the field of interior and furniture design. She became responsible for its range of textiles, eventually creating over 30 commissioned designs. This work represented a challenge for the designer because the patterns had to be attractive yet simple in design and inexpensive to manufacture. Marx worked within the constraints of a limited number of looms, four board-selected colours, and only two yarn types. Unlike her experience with the London Passenger Transport commissions, Marx found the process of collaboration with manufacturers on Utility Furniture textiles to be a successful one. The textile patterns were primarily geometric, although Marx also introduced some floral motifs after seeking feedback from her charwoman.

=== Book design ===
In 1929 Marx designed her first commercial book cover, for a monograph on the engravings of Albrecht Dürer. She created patterned papers for the Curwen Press and received further commissions from Chatto and Windus. During the Second World War, she began writing and illustrating her own small format children's books, including Bulgy the Barrage Balloon (1941) and The Pigeon Ace.

After the war Marx designed covers for Penguin Books. She finished an engraving series called Marco's Animal Alphabet in 1979, although it was not published until after her death.

=== Other selected work ===
Marx designed the frame around the portrait of Queen Elizabeth II on the British Wilding series of penny, halfpenny, and three-halfpenny stamps, and the 1976 Christmas stamp issue featuring medieval embroidery. During World War II, she was commissioned by The Pilgrim Trust to paint 14 watercolours of buildings under threat from bombing for its "Recording Britain" project. During the 1950s and 1960s, Marx produced two posters for London Transport.

In 1965 she became Head of Department of Dress, Textiles and Ceramics at Croydon College of Art, where she taught for five years before her retirement.

== Popular and traditional art ==
From the late 1930s Marx and her partner, the historian Margaret Lambert, began collecting popular ephemera, such as scrapbooks, valentines, paper peepshows, children's books, Staffordshire dog figurines and toys. They used their collection as the basis for a book entitled When Victoria Began to Reign, published by Faber and Faber in 1937. In 1947 they published English Popular and Traditional Art (in the Collins Britain in Pictures series), and in 1951 English Popular Art was published.

In the introduction to the 1947 book they defined their subject as "the art which ordinary people have, from time immemorial, introduced into their everyday lives, sometimes making it themselves, at others imposing their tastes on the product of the craftsmen or of the machine". Marx and Lambert's collection of popular art was put on display at Compton Verney House in 2004.

== Teaching ==
Marx taught a Wednesday design and engraving class at the Ruskin School of Art at Oxford, with colleagues Barnett Freedman, Eric Ravilious and Paul Nash, until 1936. Marx then considered several teaching positions after the war at Central School of Arts and Crafts and the RCA, before eventually getting hired in 1947 at Gravesend School of Art, teaching creative design for fabric printing. In 1949 she took an interior decoration lecturer position at the London County Council City Literary Institute in Covent Garden. Between 1951 and 1955 Marx taught design at Maidstone College of Art in Kent and between 1955 and 1957 she taught embroidery (design) at Bromley College of Art. Marx was appointed head of Textiles, Dress and Ceramics at Croydon College of Art in 1960 and in 1965, she retired from her full-time position to become a guest lecturer in textile history.

== Honours ==
Enid Marx became a member of the Society of Wood Engravers in 1925. She was also a member of the Red Rose Guild. She was awarded the distinguished status of Royal Designer for Industry by the British Royal Society of Arts in 1944. Marx was one of the designers chosen to exhibit in the Royal Pavilion at the Festival of Britain in 1951. The London Transport Museum recorded an oral history with Marx in 1980.

== Personal life ==
During the late 1950s and 1960s, Marx lived with her partner Margaret Lambert in St Andrews, Scotland. Lambert, a lecturer in history at the University of St Andrews, died in 1995. Marx died in London on 18 May 1998, aged 95.

== Legacy ==
Marx's archive was left to the Victoria and Albert Museum.

Retrospective exhibitions of Marx's work have taken place at the Pallant House Gallery in Chichester during 2012 and in London from May to September 2018 at the House of Illustration. Items from her textile collection were displayed as part of an exhibition in London in 2020. The Compton Verney Art Gallery, Warwickshire will host an exhibition of her work from July 2026 to January 2027. Compton Verney also holds the Enid Marx/Margaret Lambert Collection of Folk Art in its permanent collection.

In April 2022, English Heritage unveiled a blue plaque in Marx's honour on her former home and studio at 39 Thornhill Road, Barnsbury, Islington, London.

== Selected publications ==
- English Popular and Traditional Arts, co-authored by Margaret Lambert, (1946) Collins
- English Popular Art, co-authored by Margaret Lambert, (1951) B.T. Batsford
- An ABC of Birds & Beasts (1985) Clover Hill Editions

=== Children's books ===
- Nursery Rhymes (1939) Chatto & Windus, London
- Bulgy, the Barrage Balloon (1941) Oxford University Press
- Nelson, the Kite of the King's Navy (1942) Chatto & Windus
- The Pigeon Ace (1942) Faber & Faber
- The Butterfly's Ball and the Grasshopper's Feast (1944–1945) Transatlantic Arts
- Tom Thumb: the Diverting Story of his Life (1944–1946) Transatlantic Arts
- A Book of Rigmaroles or Jingle Rhymes (1945) Penguin Books
- The Little White Bear (1945) Faber & Faber
- Slithery Sam (1947) Wingate
- Who Killed Cock Robin? (1996) Incline Press
- Marco's Animal Alphabet, co-authored by Peter Alan, Graham Moss and Cartiere Miliani Fabriano (2000) Incline Press
