= Ethel Mairet =

British hand loom weaver

- Born: Ethel Mary Partridge; 17 February 1872; Barnstaple, Devon, England
- Died: 18 November 1952 (aged 80); Ditchling, East Sussex, England
- Other names: Ethel Coomaraswamy
- Known for: Hand loom weaving designer
- Notable work: A Book on Vegetable Dyes

Ethel Mary Partridge, Ethel Mary Mairet RDI, or Ethel Mary Coomaraswamy (17 February 1872 – 18 November 1952) was a British hand loom weaver, significant in the development of the craft during the first half of the twentieth century.

== Early life ==
Ethel Mary Partridge was born in Barnstaple, Devon, in 1872. Her parents were David (a pharmacist) and Mary Ann (born Hunt) Partridge. She was educated locally and in 1899 she qualified to teach the piano at the Royal Academy of Music. She then took up work as a governess, first in London and later in Bonn, Germany.

== Introduction to textiles ==
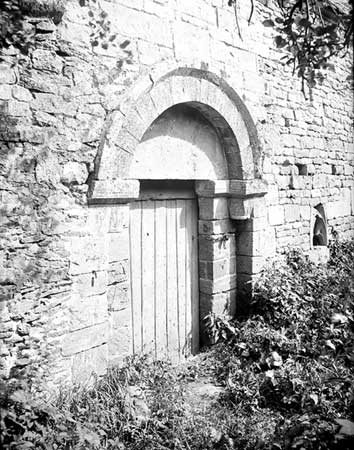
The Norman Chapel House main entrance in Broad Campden in 1895. This (partly 12th century) house was renovated by C. R. Ashbee for Ananda Coomaraswamy from 1905 to 1907

She met the art historian and philosopher Ananda Coomaraswamy. The couple married on 19 June 1902 and travelled to Ceylon (now Sri Lanka), where he conducted a mineral survey. The couple recorded the arts and crafts of each village, and Mairet kept detailed journals, photographing each craft she observed. They returned to England in 1907 and published their investigations into Ceylon crafts.

Until 1910 they lived in Broad Campden where the arts and crafts architect Charles Robert Ashbee had established a community of artists and craftspeople. This Guild and School of Handicraft in Chipping Campden included Ethel's brother Frederick James Partridge, a jeweller. Ashbee renovated a Norman chapel as the Coomaraswamy home. The couple visited India, where they added to the textile collection they had begun whilst in Ceylon.

== Weaving and dyeing ==
Aside from some rudimentary lessons in Ceylon and the British Isles, Ethel Mairet was self-taught as a weaver, spinner and dyer. Although she was well-known for weaving, she acknowledged that she was not a talented weaver.

Mairet made her first experiments with weaving and dyeing in 1909 in Chipping Camden. She studied vegetable dyes in the Bodleian Library, Oxford and is said to have travelled to the Lake District to learn weaving during this period. Her knowledge of dyes and mordants were likely compounded by her father (a chemist) and her husband Ananda Coomaraswamy (a botanist).

Over the winter of 1910 Mairet and Coomaraswamy travelled to India. She wrote to the Ashbees over this period, and kept a journal detailing her discoveries of rare textiles and decorative jewellery, noting the vegetable dyes used.

In 1910 Coomaraswamy began having an affair and their marriage ended. Ethel then built a house near Barnstaple complete with studios for textile dyeing and weaving. In 1913 she married Philip Mairet and together they established the Thatched House, a joint home and studio near Stratford upon Avon. The studio provided a base for her first weaving workshop. The following year she was visited by Mahatma Gandhi, who knew of her work in Ceylon and was interested in using simple textile techniques in India (see Khadi).

In 1916 she published A Book on Vegetable Dyes printed by Hilary Pepler at the Hampshire House Press in Hammersmith, London.

== Ditchling ==
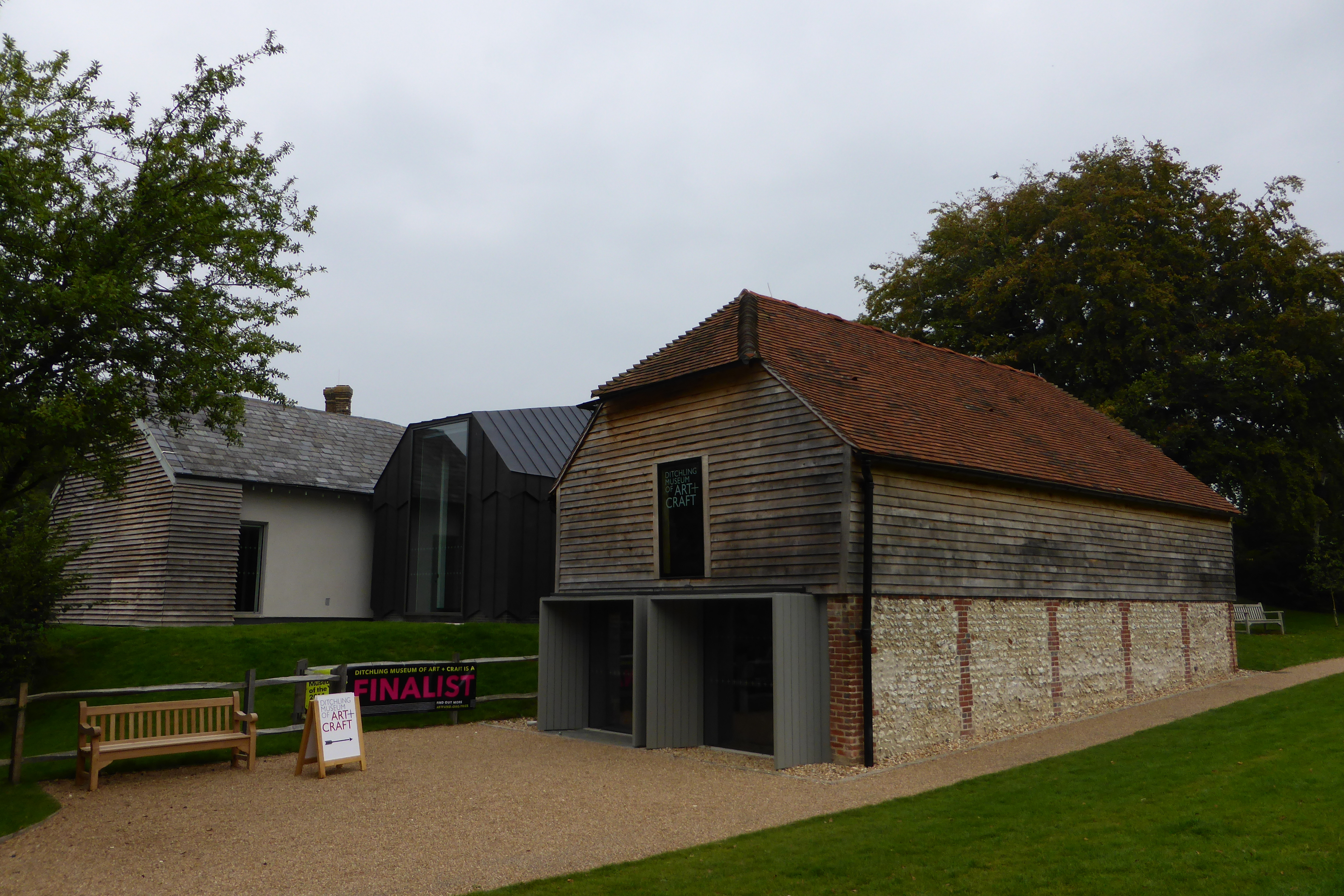
Ditchling Museum of Art + Craft

In 1916 she visited Hilary Pepler in Ditchling, and decided to move there herself. In 1917 she completed An Essay on Crafts and Obedience and oversaw the production of the second edition of A Book on Vegetable Dyes, both published by Pepler at St Dominic's Press in Ditchling.

Gospels, Mairet's third and final building project, was completed in late 1920. During the 1930s and 1940s she trained people in weaving and dyeing at her Ditchling studio. Mairet's training is said to have influenced all the handweavers of that generation, including Hilary Bourne, Valentine KilBride, Elizabeth Peacock, Petra Gill and Peter Collingwood.

The Swiss weaver Marianne Straub came to work with her and to learn more about hand loom weaving; Mairet taught Straub about hand dyeing and spinning as well. Straub introduced a variety of double cloth weaves and developed a friendship with Mairet. Mairet learnt in turn from Straub and this underwrote her belief that hand loom weaving could be used by industry. Straub and Mairet went on three European holidays during the mid 1930s. Straub frequently returned to Mairet and Gospels. A surviving journal written by Mairet from a European journey with her husband in 1927 illustrates how her observations were dominated not by whom she met but what they were wearing.

In 1921 Bernard Leach and Shoji Hamada visited Mairet at Gospels.

Mairet was a member of both the Red Rose Guild of Craftsmen and the Guild of Weavers, Spinners and Dyers, and in 1937 she became the first woman awarded the Royal Society of Arts title of Royal Designer for Industry. In 1939 she published Handweaving Today, Traditions and Change. She taught at the Brighton College of Art from 1939 until 1947.

== Legacy ==
Mairet died in Ditchling Common in 1952 and was buried in Brighton, at St Nicholas' churchyard.

Mairet influenced a generation of weavers. The Oxford Dictionary of National Biography quotes the Japanese potter Shoji Hamada who called Mairet "the mother of English hand-weaving". Ditchling Museum of Art + Craft exhibits artifacts related to Mairet and other artists who worked locally.

She is the subject of a biography, A Weaver's Life: Ethel Mairet.

The Ethel Mairet archive is held at the Crafts Study Centre. It includes documents and memorabilia from 1872–1952. Personal documents, travel journals 1910–1938. business and personal letters, books of account and photographs are included and are still a subject of academic study.

== Published works ==
- Mairet, Ethel M. (1916). A Book on Vegetable Dyes. Douglas Pepler at the Hampshire House Workshops, Hammersmith, gutenberg.org.
- Ethel Mairet (1939). Hand-weaving To-day, Traditions and Changes: By Ethel Mairet,... Faber and Faber.
