= Phyllis Barron =

English designer

- Born: Mabel Phyllis Barron; 19 March 1890; Taplow, Buckinghamshire, England
- Died: 23 November 1964 (aged 74)
- Education: Slade School of Fine Art
- Known for: Textile design
- Partner: Dorothy Larcher

Mabel Phyllis Barron (19 March 1890 – 23 November 1964) was an English designer, known for her textile printing workshop with Dorothy Larcher. These textiles are ‘noted for the assurance and originality of the designs, their distinctive and subtle colouring, and the quality of the materials selected’

== Early life and education ==
Barron was born in Taplow House in Taplow, Buckinghamshire, the daughter of Alice (née Clark) and Walter Barron. She later described her father as 'something in the City' and considered her family to be rich. She encountered block printing in her mid teens while on a sketching holiday in Normandy, when the tutor gave her some old printing blocks to experiment with. On realising that the blocks were designed for textiles not paper, she researched further in the library of the Victoria and Albert Museum. She attended the Slade School of Fine Art, where she studied fine art under Henry Tonks, but continued her independent efforts to experiment with printing and to learn about dyeing techniques. She was particularly interested in traditional Indian block printing techniques and rural French designs.

== Career ==
In 1917, Barron had her first exhibition and subsequently showed her work at several exhibitions at the Brook Street Gallery together with weaving from Ethel Mairet’s workshop. Some of Barron's earliest commissions came from the Duke of Westminster's architect, Detmar Blow; she created all the textiles used in the Duke's yacht, in his estate offices and in his hunting lodge. The Duke introduced Barron to Coco Chanel, who placed an order of Barron's cushions for her garden. She also exhibited pieces at the Omega Workshops but never became further involved in running the business.

In 1923, Barron and Dorothy Larcher began to share a workshop in Parkhill Road, Hampstead, dyeing and block-printing their designs on textiles, and selling the results to interior decorators and fashion designers. Barron favored geometric prints. Enid Marx served as their apprentice from 1925 to 1927. Barron and Larcher were featured in a show of "Handmade Textiles and Pots" at Heal's Mansard Gallery in London. Artist Paul Nash said of Barron in 1926, "She is a true designer and a true craftswoman."

Barron and Larcher relocated their work to Hambutts House, Painswick, Gloucestershire, in 1930. Stables on the property became a workshop with a large dyeing vat for working with indigo. The grounds became gardens filled with flowers and other plants useful to their work, either practically or as visual inspiration. Among their major commissions they provided hand-printed linen for the interior furnishings, including upholstery and curtains, of a new wing at Girton College, Cambridge in 1932, and curtains for the choir stalls at Winchester Cathedral.

For about a decade they prospered in Painswick and even hired three assistants for a time; but by the early 1940s they had to discontinue production in the face of wartime shortages.

Later in life, Phyllis Barron taught art teachers at Dartington Hall, visited classes at Stroud School of Art, and worked with several young artists interested in printing. She also became active in local government, and served for a time as chair of the Painswick Parish Council, and a member of the Stroud rural district council. She was a member of the Red Rose Guild.

== Personal life ==
Phyllis Barron lived and worked with her partner Dorothy Larcher for almost thirty years, until Larcher's death in 1952. They decorated their home with their own fabrics, and wore printed dresses of their own design. Phyllis Barron died in 1964, age 74. She left her collections of printing blocks and samples to her friend, artist Robin Tanner. Tanner, in time, donated them to the Crafts Study Centre, then in Bath, now housed at University for the Creative Arts in Surrey.

In 1966, a memorial exhibition of Barron and Larcher's works was held at the Royal West of England Academy. Fabrics printed by Barron and Larcher are in the collections at the Victoria and Albert Museum, the Whitworth Art Gallery in Manchester, the Crafts Study Centre in Farnham among other institutions.
