= Dorothy Larcher =

English designer of textiles

- Born: Dorothy Larcher; 1884
- Died: 1952 (aged 67–68)
- Known for: Textile Design
- Partner: Phyllis Barron

Dorothy Larcher (1884–1952) was an English designer of textiles, known for the printing workshops she shared with Phyllis Barron in Hampstead (1923–1930) and Painswick, Gloucestershire (1930–1940).

== Early life and education ==
Dorothy Larcher was born in St. Pancras, London, the daughter of William Gustavus Francis Larcher and Eliza Arkell Larcher. She attended Hornsey School of Art, where she would later teach. She learned about block printing textiles while traveling in India as a paid companion and assistant to British artist Christiana Herringham.

== Career ==
Larcher joined Phyllis Barron in a textile workshop in Parkhill Road, Hampstead, in 1923. From 1925 to 1927, Enid Marx was their apprentice. They produced custom-printed fabrics on commission, for decorators and fashion designers. Larcher's designs tended to be more organic than Barron's geometric prints. Their works were featured in a show called "Handmade Textiles and Pots" at Heal's Mansard Gallery in London.

The couple moved their workshop to Hambutts House, Painswick in Gloucestershire in 1930. An outbuilding at their new location became a workshop with a large vat for indigo. The gardens were used to grow plants valuable to their work, either for dye-making or for visual inspiration. The workshop closed around 1940, in the face of wartime shortages. Among their major commissions they provided hand-printed linen for the interior furnishings, including upholstery and curtains, of a new wing at Girton College, Cambridge in 1932, and curtains for the choir stalls at Winchester Cathedral. Larcher was a member of the Red Rose Guild.

After their workshop days, Larcher painted nearly 40 floral studies. Their textiles toured museums in the United States during World War II, as part of a larger exhibition by the British Council on contemporary British craftsmanship.

== Personal life ==
Phyllis Barron lived and worked with her partner Dorothy Larcher for almost thirty years, until Larcher's death in 1952. They decorated their home with their own fabrics, and wore printed dresses of their own design. Phyllis Barron died in 1964, age 74. She left her collections of printing blocks and samples to her friend, artist Robin Tanner. Tanner, in time, donated them to the Crafts Study Centre, then in Bath, now housed at University for the Creative Arts in Surrey.

In 1966, a memorial exhibition of Barron and Larcher's works was held at the Royal West of England Academy. Fabrics printed by Barron and Larcher are in the collections at the Victoria and Albert Museum, the Whitworth Art Gallery in Manchester, the Crafts Study Centre in Farnham among other institutions.

Dorothy Larcher died in 1952, at a nursing home in Stroud. She had lived and worked in partnership with Phyllis Barron for almost thirty years. After Barron's death, their samples and collections were passed down to artist Robin Tanner; they are now held at the Crafts Study Centre at the University for the Creative Arts in Surrey.
