= Coleshill, Oxfordshire =

Village and civil parish in England

Coordinates: 51.642°N 1.661°W

Coleshill
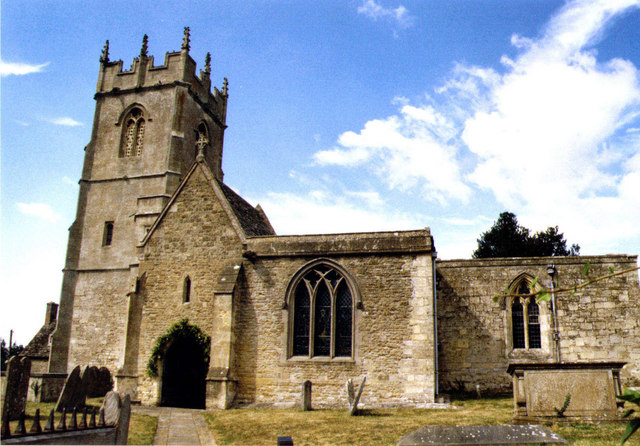
- All Saints' parish church

- Location within Oxfordshire
- Population: 143 (2021 census)
- OS grid reference: SU2393
- Civil parish: Coleshill
- District: Vale of White Horse
- Shire county: Oxfordshire
- Region: South East
- Country: England
- Sovereign state: United Kingdom
- Post town: Swindon
- Postcode district: SN6
- Dialling code: 01793
- Police: Thames Valley
- Fire: Oxfordshire
- Ambulance: South Central
- UK Parliament: Witney

Coleshill is a village and civil parish in the Vale of White Horse district of Oxfordshire, England. Coleshill was part of Berkshire until the 1974 boundary changes transferred it to Oxfordshire. The village is beside the River Cole, which forms both the western boundary of the parish and also the county boundary with Wiltshire. Coleshill is about 3 miles (5 km) west of the market town of Faringdon, and about 2 miles (3 km) east of the Wiltshire town of Highworth. The village is on the B4019 road that links the two towns. The 2021 census recorded the population of the parish as 143.

== Toponym ==
The toponym "Coleshill" is derived from the Old English kollr, meaning "head", "top" or "hill". It may be that the river was named after the hill, and then "hill" was added as a suffix to "Cole". The earliest known record of it is Colleshyll in a Saxon will dated 950. The Domesday Book of 1086 records it as Coleselle and Coleshalle. A document dated 1220 and included in the Book of Fees records it as Coleshull. Coleshull and Colleshulle were used from the 14th to the 16th century, before the current form came to be used.

== Demographics ==
Census population of Coleshill, Oxfordshire parish
Census	Population	Female	Male	Households	Source
2001	163	81	82	70	
2011	156	75	81	75	
2021	143	74	69	70	

== Coleshill estate ==
The National Trust's Coleshill Estate is in the parish. Coleshill House was the ancestral home of the Earls of Radnor.

In the Second World War, Coleshill House, on the estate, was the headquarters of the secret Auxiliary Units, who were to hamper Nazi German forces if the United Kingdom were invaded. Coleshill House burned down in 1952.

== Parish church ==
The oldest parts of the Church of England parish church of All Saints are late 12th-century; other parts are 13th-century and the tower is 15th-century. The building was refashioned in the 18th century and restored by Street. In 1708, Abraham I Rudhall of Gloucester cast a ring of five bells for the west tower. In 1884, Mears and Stainbank of the Whitechapel Bell Foundry recast the third bell. In 1938, Mears and Stainbank cast a new treble bell to increase the ring to six. All Saints is a grade II* listed building.

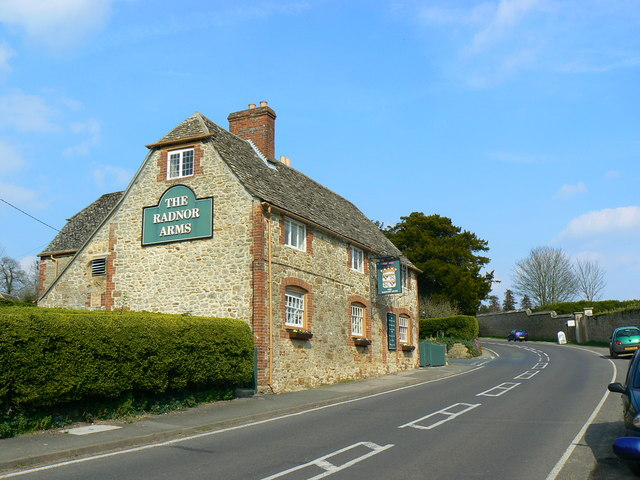
The Radnor Arms pub

== Amenities ==
Much of the village was shaped by the local landowner, the Earl of Radnor. Coleshill has an 18th-century pub, the Radnor Arms. School Lane has a number of grade II listed Radnor estate cottages dating from about 1850.

== Notable people ==
The record producer Sir George Martin lived at the former rectory until his death in March 2016. His private funeral was held in All Saints Church.

== Bibliography ==
- Ditchfield, PH; Page, William, eds. (1924). "Coleshill". A History of the County of Berkshire. Victoria County History. Vol. IV. assisted by John Hautenville Cope. London: The St Katherine Press. pp. 517–523.
- Ekwall, Eilert (1960) [1936]. Concise Oxford Dictionary of English Place-Names (4th ed.). Oxford: Oxford University Press. Coleshill. ISBN 0198691033.
- Pevsner, Nikolaus (1966). Berkshire. The Buildings of England. Harmondsworth: Penguin Books. pp. 117–119.
