= 1945 United Kingdom general election in England =

Topic in 1945 United Kingdom general election

- 5 July 1945

All 517 English seats in the House of Commons
- Turnout: 73.4% (▲2.7 pp)
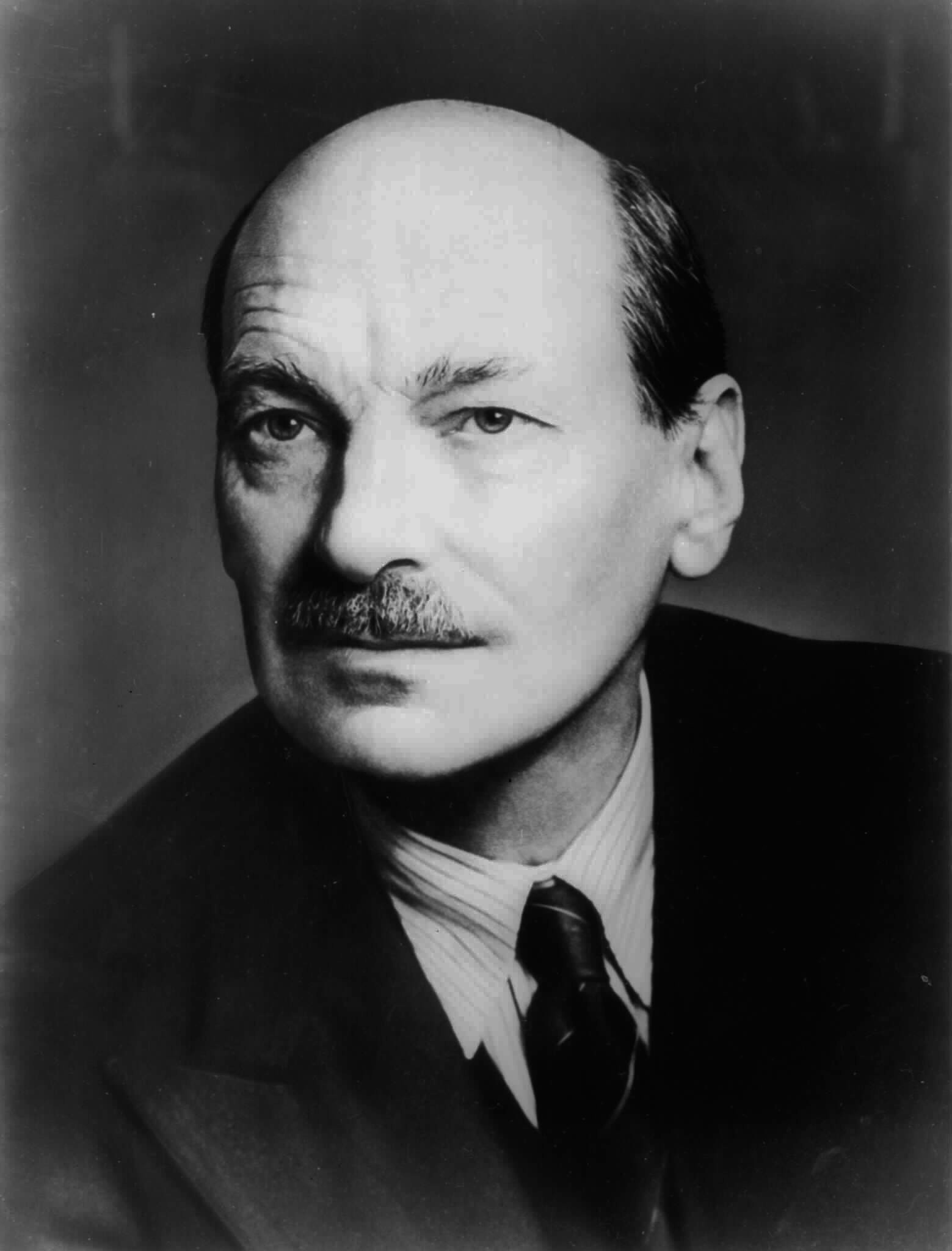

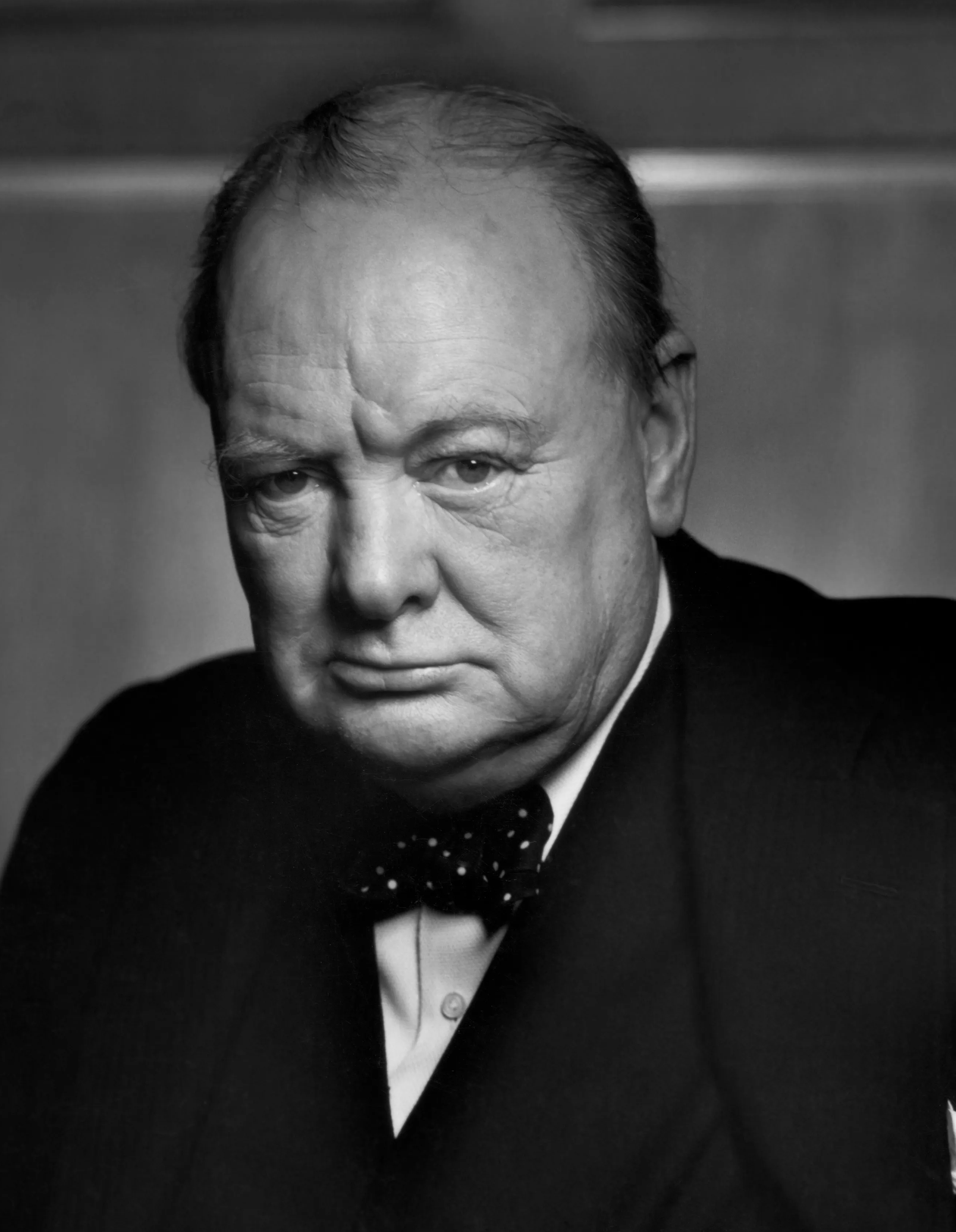

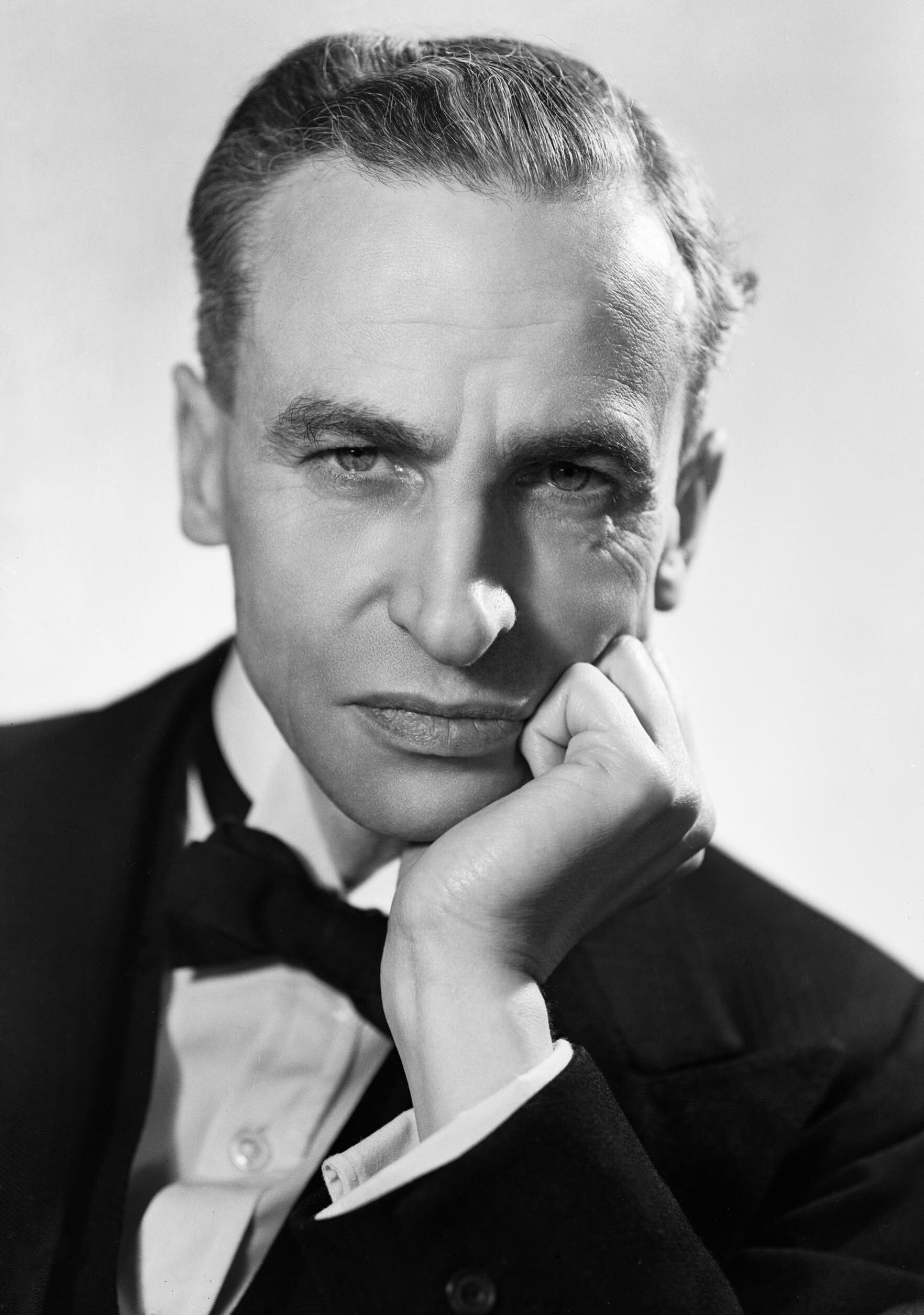

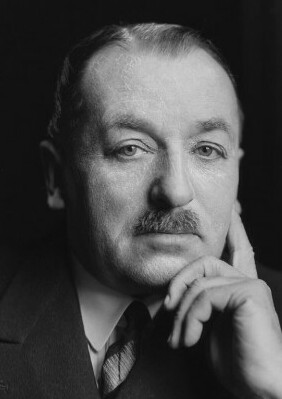
	First party	Second party
Leader	Clement Attlee	Winston Churchill
Party	Labour	Conservative
Alliance		Churchill Caretaker Ministry
Leader since	25 October 1935	9 October 1940
Leader's seat	Limehouse	Woodford
Last election	116 seats, (Note: Combined results for county, borough and university seats.) 38.5%	333 seats, 49.4%
Seats won	331	160 (Note: Figure includes Speaker of the House of Commons Douglas Clifton Brown in Hexham.)
Seat change	▲215	▼173
Popular vote	9,972,519 (Note: Total and percentage votes given here are for territorial constituencies only)	7,575,577
Percentage	48.5%	37.0%
Swing	▲10.0 pp	▼12.4 pp
	Third party	Fourth party
Leader	Archibald Sinclair	Ernest Brown
Party	Liberal	Liberal National
Alliance		Churchill Caretaker Ministry
Leader since	26 November 1935	1940
Leader's seat	Caithness and Sutherland (lost seat)	Leith (lost seat)
Last election	11 seats, 6.3%	22 seats, 3.4%
Seats won	5	7
Seat change	▼6	▼15
Popular vote	1,913,917	587,752
Percentage	9.4%	2.7%
Swing	▲3.1 pp	▼0.7 pp

On Thursday 5 July 1945, the 1945 United Kingdom general election was held in England, to elect all 640 members of the House of Commons, with 517 seats being in England. 510 seats represented territorial constituencies contested under the first past the post electoral system, and seven additional seats represented the university constituencies. Three university constituencies returned two members through the single transferable vote electoral system and one returned one member by the first past the post system. The number of county and borough constituencies was increased by 25 seats to 510 seats from the 485 seats used between the 1918 and 1935 general elections.

This was the final election in which the university constituencies elected seats to the House of Commons, due to them being abolished for the 1950 general election by the Representation of the People Act 1948.

Held less than two months following VE Day, this was the first general election since 1935, as general elections had been suspended by Parliament during the Second World War. Clement Attlee, the leader of the Labour Party, refused Winston Churchill's offer of continuing the wartime coalition until the Allied defeat of Japan. On 15 June 1945, King George VI dissolved Parliament, which had been sitting for nearly ten years without an election. Counting for the election was not completed until 26 July (three weeks after polling day) to enable those stationed overseas to vote.

As it was the first general election held since the conclusion of the Second World War and nearly 10 years since the 1935 general election, it was the first of three elections during the reign of King George VI.

== Candidates ==
Below is a table summarising the candidates of the 1945 general election in England, excluding those in the university constituencies.

Affiliation	Candidates
Labour Party	494
Conservative and Unionist Party	461
Liberal Party	265
Liberal National Party	38
Independent	22
Common Wealth Party	21
Communist Party of Great Britain	15
National Independent	9 (Note: This category of candidates refers to independents that supported the National Government coalition, labelled as National Independents, but were not themselves a part of the National Government. The candidates that stood were Norman Tiptaft in Birmingham Handsworth, Arthur Talbot in Blackpool North, Daniel Lipson in Cheltenham, MH Woodard in Chichester, John Brown in Forest of Dean, Austin Hopkinson in Mossley, Stephen King-Hall in Ormskirk, Tom Mitchell in Penrith and Cockermouth and Harry Lane in The Hartlepools.)
National	8 (Note: The candidates that represented this group were officially Howard Leicester in Bethnal Green South West, Andrew Duncan in City of London and William Craven-Ellis in Southampton, former Liberal National member Leslie Hore-Belisha in Plymouth, Devonport, and former National Labour members Harold Nicolson in Leicester West, Beresford Craddock in Lichfield, Frank Markham in Nottingham South and Sebastian Earl in Wednesbury.)
Democratic Party	5 (Note: The candidates that stood were Paul Tracy Carter in Chichester, G Murray in Maidstone, Walter Foster in Portsmouth Central, John Keast in Portsmouth Central and party leader Norman Leith-Hay-Clark in Westminster Abbey.)
Independent Progressive	5 (Note: The candidates that stood were Vernon Bartlett in Bridgwater, J. A. Ward in Edmonton, Aubrey Bernard Brocklehurst in Eccles, Sydney Muller in Hastings, Leonard Melling in Nuneaton.)
Independent National	4 (Note: These candidates were those who declared their for support the National Government, however stood against candidates from the National Government/Churchill Caretaker Ministry in the election. The candidates that stood were Thomas Disher in Camberwell North, William Hipwell in Eastbourne, Wallace Drake-Brockman in Heston and Isleworth and Archibald Church in Tottenham South.)
Independent Labour	4 (Note: The candidates that stood were Andrew MacLaren in Burslem, John Worrall in North Cornwall, Denis Pritt in Hammersmith North and James Bugby in Northampton.)
Independent Conservative	3 (Note: The candidates that stood were Eleonora Tennant in Putney, John Wilson in South Norfolk and in Alec Cunningham-Reid in St Marylebone.)
Independent Labour Party	2 (Note: The candidates that stood were Arthur Eaton in Bilston and Will Ballantine in Bradford East.)
Agriculturalist	2 (Note: The candidates that stood were Robert Goodall in West Derbyshire and Charles Edwards in Ludlow.)
Liverpool Protestant Party	1 (Note: Candidate and leader of the party Harry Dixon Longbottom stood in Liverpool Kirkdale.)
Socialist Party of Great Britain	1 (Note: Candidate Clifford Groves stood in Paddington North.)
Independent Liberal	1 (Note: Candidate John Howlett stood in New Forest and Christchurch.)
Christian Pacifist	1 (Note: Candidate John Dempsey stood in Kettering.)
Medical	1 (Note: Candidate E F St John Lyburn stood in Tonbridge under the label of 'Medical' candidate. He advocated the setting up of diagnostic clinics.)
Total	1,363

== Outcome ==
=== Major parties ===
The election led to the first majority victory of the Labour Party in the House of Commons and England. It was also the first time that the Labour Party won the popular vote in any general election in England as well as the nation. Conversely, it was the first election since 1906 that the Conservative Party did not win the largest share of votes in the nation as well as England. For the rest of the twentieth century, the Labour Party would only win a majority of seats in England in the 1966 and 1997 elections. The 331 seat tally of the Labour Party under Clement Attlee remained the highest number of seats it ever won in England until the 2024 general election under Sir Keir Starmer. The vote share of the Labour Party in England has only been exceeded once, being the vote Labour received in the 1951.

The Labour party gained 217 seats in England at the election, including the majority of the 25 new seats created in England, with the Conservatives taking the remainder. The Labour seat gains came primarily from the Conservative Party. Notably, future Conservative Prime Minister Harold Macmillan lost his Stockton-on-Tees constituency to Labour, however would return to Parliament in the 1945 Bromley by-election. Labour also gained the single-member seats of Luton, Plymouth, Devonport, Gateshead, Hinckley and Bosworth, Southwark North, Great Yarmouth, Newcastle upon Tyne East, Walsall, Huddersfield and Spen Valley from the National Liberal Party. Labour also won one seat from the Liberal Nationals in the two-member seats of Sunderland, Southampton, Oldham and Norwich. Overall, the Liberal Nationals lost 15 seats in England, the bulk of its 22 losses across the United Kingdom. Notably, incumbent Leslie Hore-Belisha, though elected as a Liberal National, resigned from the party in 1942 and unsuccessfully stood as a National Independent in Plymouth, Devonport. The Liberal National Party did not contest the seat at this election. Hore-Belisha, while only facing Labour in the race, lost the seat to future Labour Leader of the Opposition Michael Foot.

Additionally, Labour gained Ormskirk, Leicester West, Nottingham South, Lichfield and Leeds Central from National Labour. It also gained one of the two seats in Derby (the other of which was a Labour retain from 1935) from National Labour by way of a retention of the seat from the 1936 Derby by-election when compared to the last election. National Labour had been dissolved in June 1945 and therefore did not contest any of these seats; however, four of the five remaining incumbents of the group re-contested seats in the election in England under different candidate labels but were all defeated. (Note: These were Stephen King-Hall in Ormskirk, Harold Nicolson in Leicester West, Frank Markham in Nottingham South and Beresford Craddock in Lichfield who all stood in their constituencies in which they were incumbents, and used various labels such as 'National' or 'National Independent'.) Additionally, Sebastian Earl, who also a member of the former National Labour Organisation although not an incumbent in his Labour-held seat, ran and lost in Wednesbury against Labour. One National Labour incumbent, Stephen King-Hall, though standing as a National Independent rather than a National candidate, lost his seat of Ormskirk to future Labour Prime Minister Harold Wilson. Other prominent Labour Party figures that entered Parliament included Barbara Castle in Blackburn, and future Chancellor of the Exchequer under Attlee and subsequent Leader of the Opposition Hugh Gaitskell in Leeds South.

Much like in the rest of the United Kingdom in the election, the Liberal Party lost more than half of its seats in England despite increasing its vote share. The party lost its urban seats of Birkenhead East, Bristol North, Bethnal Green South West, Wolverhampton East, Middlesbrough West and Bradford South to the Labour Party, as well as losing the more rural seats of Isle of Ely, Barnstaple and Berwick-upon-Tweed to the Conservative Party. Conversely, however, the party gained North Dorset and Buckrose from the Conservative Party. It also gained Eye from the National Liberal Party wherein the incumbent Member of Parliament Edgar Granville switched parties to the Liberals, winning the seat from his former party. Overall, the party lost six seats in total in England.

=== Minor parties ===
Outside the major parties to the election, several other parties and candidates gained seats. The short-lived minor Common Wealth Party candidate Vernon Bartlett retained Bridgwater, which he had won in the 1938 Bridgwater by-election. Barlett's retention of the seat represented a gain from the Conservative Party when compared with the previous election. The Independent Progressive group's candidate Ernest Millington gained Chelmsford from the Conservatives for the Progressives, however later crossed to the Labour Party in 1946.

The Independent Labour candidate Denis Pritt, future chairman of the short-lived Labour Independent Group, gained Hammersmith North from the Labour Party. The Communist Party of Great Britain also gained Mile End from the Labour Party. These were the only two seat losses for the Labour Party in England. The only one other seat loss for the Labour party across the United Kingdom in this election occurred in Wales.

=== National candidates and independents ===
Independent candidates in the borough and county constituencies won Grantham and Rugby. Denis Kendall, the Managing Director of BMARC, gained the seat of Grantham at the 1942 Grantham by-election. William Brown won the seat of Rugby at the 1942 Rugby by-election. Both retentions of these seats by the incumbent independent were gains from the Conservative Party compared to the last election.

Furthermore, aside the four former English National Labour incumbents that re-contested their seats, a fifth total former member nationally re-contested. Kenneth Lindsay who had represented Kilmarnock as part of the National Labour Party in Scotland, stood and won as an independent candidate instead in the Combined English Universities constituency, winning one of the two available seats. His win, however, was a gain from the Conservative Party which did not stand a candidate compared to the previous election. Independent candidate Wilson Harris also won a seat in the Cambridge University in effect from the Conservatives party. Arthur Salter, who won as an independent against the Conservatives in the Oxford University at the 1937 Oxford University by-election, retained the seat, representing a gain from the Conservatives compared to the last election. Eleanor Rathbone, although part of the Independent Progressive group, retained her seat in the Combined English Universities constituency as an independent. Rathbone would, however, die in 1946, causing the 1946 Combined English Universities by-election. This was the last university constituency election in England. Finally, A. P. Herbert retained his Oxford University seat. Overall, independent candidates gained five seats from the Conservatives, totalling seven in English constituencies.

National candidate and Minister Andrew Duncan, who had won one of the two seats in City of London at the 1940 City of London by-election, retained his seat as a National and therefore represented a gain from the Conservatives. Together with John Anderson in Scotland, he and Anderson represented the two National gains across the United Kingdom.

Among the National Independent candidates (candidates who supported the National Government but who were not a part of the Government itself or its constituent parties), the number of seats remained at two both in England and nationally. Member of Parliament Daniel Lipson retained his seat in Cheltenham which he had won in the 1937 Cheltenham by-election, representing a gain from the Conservatives. National Independent Ernest Graham-Little retained his seat in the London University Constituency from the previous election. However, long-serving National Independent Member of Parliament Austin Hopkinson lost his seat of Mossley to the Labour Party.

== Seat summary ==
Below is a table summarising the total number of seats, gains and losses for each party in both the territorial county and borough constituencies and the English university constituencies.

Party	Seats			
Party	Total	Gains	Losses	Net
Labour	331	217	2	▲215
Churchill Caretaker Ministry (Total)	168	12	205	▼193
Conservative	160	11	184	▼173
Liberal National	7	0	15	▼15
National	1	1	0	▲1
National Labour	0	Dissolved		▼6
Independent	7	5	0	▲5
Liberal	5	3	9	▼6
National Independent	2	1	1	Steady
Common Wealth	1	New		▲1
Communist	1	1	0	▲1
Independent Labour	1	1	0	▲1
Independent Progressive	1	1	0	▲1
Total	517			

== County and borough constituency results ==
Below is a table summarising the constituency results of the 1945 general election in England, excluding the result in the university constituencies. The seat count and vote share comparisons for the Churchill Caretaker Ministry coalition are compared with the National Government coalition which had effectively dissolved in 1940.

Party	Seats					Aggregate votes		
Party	Total	Gains	Losses	Net	Of all (%)	Total	Of all (%) (Note: Adjusted for multi-member constituencies.)	Change (%)
Labour	331	217	2	▲215	64.9	9,972,519	48.5	▲10.0
Churchill Caretaker Ministry (Total)	167	12	202	▼190	32.7	8,269,191	40.2	▼14.3
Conservative	159	11	181	▼170	31.2	7,575,577	37.0	▼12.4
Liberal National	7	0	15	▼15	1.4	587,752	2.7	▼0.7
National	1	1 (Note: Andrew Duncan in City of London.)	0	▲1	0.2	105,862	0.5	▲0.4
National Labour	0	Dissolved		▼6	—	0	0.0	▼1.6
Liberal	5	3	9	▼6	1.0	1,913,917	9.4	▲3.1
Common Wealth	1	New		▲1	0.2	106,403	0.5	New
Independent	2	2 (Note: Denis Kendall in Grantham and William Brown in Rugby.)	0	▲2	0.4	84,066	0.4	Steady
Communist	1	Did not stand in 1935		▲1	0.2	53,754	0.3	—N/a
National Independent	1	1 (Note: Daniel Lipson in Cheltenham.)	1 (Note: Austin Hopkinson in Mossley.)	Steady	0.2	53,095	0.3	Steady
Independent Labour	1	1 (Note: Denis Pritt in Hammersmith North.)	0	▲1	0.2	23,443	0.1	Steady
Independent Progressive	1	1 (Note: Vernon Bartlett in Bridgwater.)	0	▲1	0.2	22,561	0.1	▲0.1
Independent Conservative	0	0	0	Steady	—	9,729	0.0	Steady
Independent Liberal	0	0	0	Steady	—	8,299	0.0	Steady
Ind. Labour Party	0	0	0	Steady	—	6,044	0.0	▼0.1
Independent National	0	New			—	5,430	0.0	New
Liverpool Protestant	0	0	0	Steady	—	2,601	0.0	Steady
Christian Pacifist	0	New			—	2,381	0.0	New
Agriculturalist	0	New			—	2,057	0.0	New
Democratic	0	New			—	1,809	0.0	New
Medical	0	New			—	1,249	0.0	New
Socialist Party (GB)	0	New			—	472	0.0	New
Total	510			▲25	100.0	20,539,020	100.0	0.0
Registered voters, and turnout						27,024,404 (Note: Electorate in contested constituencies. The total electorate was 27,045,729.)	73.4	▲2.7

=== Popular vote ===
Popular vote
Labour	48.5%
Conservative	37.0%
Liberal	9.4%
Liberal National	2.7%
National	0.5%
Other	1.9%

Popular vote (coalitions)
Labour	48.5%
Caretaker Gov.	40.2%
Liberal	9.4%
Others	1.9%

=== Parliament seats ===
Parliament seats
Labour	64.9%
Conservative	31.2%
Liberal National	1.4%
Liberal	1.0%
National	0.2%
Other	1.4%

Parliament seats (coalitions)
Labour	64.9%
Caretaker Gov.	32.7%
Liberal	1.0%
Others	1.4%

== University constituency results ==
=== University results summary ===
Below is a table summarising the seats and vote share of the English university constituencies in the 1945 general election.

Party	Seats				First preference votes	
Party	Total	Gains	Losses	Net	Total	Of all (%)
Independent	5	3	0	▲3	35,480	48.3
Churchill Caretaker Ministry (Total)	1	0	3	▼3	10,202	13.9
Conservative	1	0	3	▼3	10,202	13.9
Liberal National	0	Did not stand			0	—N/a
National	0	Did not stand			0	—N/a
National Labour	0	Dissolved			0	—N/a
National Independent	1	0	0	Steady	8,654	11.8
Independent Progressive	0	0	0	Steady	12,510	17.0
Labour	0	0	0	Steady	3,414	4.7
Independent Labour	0	0	0	Steady	3,212	4.4
Total	7				73,472	

=== Cambridge University ===
The constituency for Cambridge University returned two Members of Parliament using the single transferable vote electoral system. The electorate consisted of graduates of the university.

General election 1945: Cambridge University (2 seats)
Party	Candidate	FPv%	Count			
Party	Candidate	FPv%	1	2	3	4
Conservative	Kenneth Pickthorn	46.18	10,202			
Independent	Wilson Harris	16.18	3,574	4,709	5,185	6,556
Independent Progressive	J. B. Priestley	22.82	5,041	5,128	5,238	5,745
Independent	Charles Hill	10.13	2,238	3,092	3,595	eliminated
National Independent	Ernest Leslie Howard-Williams	4.69	1,036	1,798	eliminated	–
Electorate: 42,012 Valid: 22,091 Quota: 7,364 Turnout: 52.58%

=== Combined English Universities ===
The Combined English Universities constituency, which represented effectively all red brick universities and Durham University, returned two Members of Parliament using the single transferable vote electoral system. The electorate consisted of graduates of the university.

General election 1945: Combined English Universities (2 seats)
Party	Candidate	FPv%	Count				
Party	Candidate	FPv%	1	2	3	4	5
Independent	Eleanor Rathbone	53.3	11,176				
Independent	Kenneth Lindsay	9.2	1,923	3,503	3,856	4,528	5,826
Independent Labour	Stanley Wormald	15.3	3,212	3,973	4,081	4,473	4,675
Independent	Eric Cuthbert Arden	11.6	2,433	3,073	3,389	3,829	eliminated
Independent	John Henry Richardson	5.3	1,124	1,995	2,341	eliminated	
Independent	A.R. Foxall	5.3	1,105	1,437	eliminated		
Electorate: 41,976 Valid: 20,973 Quota: 6,992 Turnout: 59.96%

=== London University ===
The constituency for London University returned one Member of Parliament using the First-past-the-post electoral system. The electorate consisted of graduates of the university.

Party	Candidate	Votes	%	±%
National Independent	Ernest Graham-Little	7,618	50.49	−19.08
Independent Progressive	Mary Stocks	7,469	49.51	New
Majority		149	0.98	−38.16
Turnout		15,087	63.00	−8.74
Registered electors		23,948		
National Independent hold		Swing		

=== Oxford University ===
The constituency for Oxford University returned two Members of Parliament using the single transferable vote electoral system. The electorate consisted of graduates of the university. As two candidates had achieved the quota in the first count, only one count was necessary.

General election 1945: Oxford University (2 seats)
Party	Candidate	FPv%	Count
Party	Candidate	FPv%	1
Independent	Arthur Salter	44.19	6,771
Independent	A. P. Herbert	33.52	5,136
Labour	G. D. H. Cole	22.28	3,414
Electorate: 28,865 Valid: 15,321 Quota: 5,108 Turnout: 53.08%

== See also ==
- 1945 United Kingdom general election in Scotland
- 1945 United Kingdom general election in Wales
- 1945 United Kingdom general election in Northern Ireland
- Churchill caretaker ministry
- List of minor party and independent MPs elected in the United Kingdom
