= 1937 Combined English Universities by-election =

UK parliamentary by-election

The 1937 Combined English Universities by-election was a parliamentary by-election for the British House of Commons dual member constituency of the Combined English Universities held on 22 March 1937.

== Vacancy ==
The by-election was caused by the death of the sitting Conservative MP, Sir Reginald Craddock on 10 February 1937. He had been an MP for the constituency since 1931.

== Election history ==
The Combined English Universities was created as a dual member seat in 1918. As with all University seats, general elections were held by the Single Transferable Vote method; however by-elections were held with First Past The Post. The university seats were thought to provide an opportunity for academics, independent of party politics, to gain representation in parliament. However, more often than not, the Conservative Party and latterly, the National government parties had used them as a means to get their own candidates elected. Since 1929, Eleanor Rathbone had overcome the party machine to sit as an Independent MP for one of the seats. The other seat had been won by a Conservative. The result at the last General Election in 1935 was that Craddock and Rathbone were returned unopposed.

== Candidates ==
The University Conservatives selected 65-year-old Rt Hon. Sir Francis Oswald Lindley. He was a long serving Diplomat who was Ambassador to Japan 1931–1934, when he retired. A 62-year-old Quaker and former Liberal MP Ted Harvey stood, but not as a Liberal candidate. He stood as an Independent Progressive candidate, saying that contests for the university seats ought to be fought on ideas and not on party political lines. A Liberal candidate had last stood in 1929 and finished as runner-up, ahead of the second Conservative candidate. Harvey had last stood for parliament at those same elections, at Leeds North coming third. He had previously been Liberal MP for Leeds West from 1910 to 1918 and Dewsbury from 1923 to 1924. A third candidate came forward - 71 year old Sir Henry Britten Brackenbury. He had contested the 1922 general election as Liberal candidate for Walthamstow East.

== Campaign ==
Polling days were set for 15–19 March 1937. When nominations closed, it was to reveal a three horse race between Lindley the Conservative, Harvey the Independent Progressive and Brackenbury the Independent.

== Result ==
Combined English Universities by-election, 1937
Party	Candidate	Votes	%	±%
Independent Progressive	Edmund Harvey	6,596	47.4	New
Conservative	Francis Oswald Lindley	4,952	35.6	N/A
Independent Liberal	Henry Britten Brackenbury	2,373	17.0	New
Majority		1,644	11.8	N/A
Turnout		13,921	48.3	N/A
Independent Progressive gain from Conservative		Swing	N/A	

The Liberal Party leader Sir Archie Sinclair, Ramsay Muir and the Liberal Party Organisation all sent messages of congratulation to Harvey when he won the by-election.

== Aftermath ==
Harvey chose to retire. The result at the following General election;

General Election 1945: Combined English Universities (2 seats)
Party	Candidate	FPv%	Count				
Party	Candidate	FPv%	1	2	3	4	5
Independent	Eleanor Rathbone	53.3	11,176				
Independent	Kenneth Lindsay	9.2	1,923	3,503	3,856	4,528	5,826
Independent Labour	Stanley Wormald	15.3	3,212	3,973	4,081	4,473	4,675
National	Eric Cuthbert Arden	11.6	2,433	3,073	3,389	3,829	eliminated
Independent	John Henry Richardson	5.3	1,124	1,995	2,341	eliminated	
Independent	A.R. Foxall	5.3	1,105	1,437	eliminated		
Electorate: 41,976 Valid: 20,973 Quota: 6,992 Turnout: 50.0%

== See also ==
- List of United Kingdom by-elections
- United Kingdom by-election records
