= Ruth Dean =

American scholar of Anglo-Norman literature

Ruth Josephine Dean (1902–2003) was an American scholar of Anglo-Norman literature. Throughout her career, she worked hard to establish the legitimacy of Anglo-Norman literature as a subject of study, and her definitive work, Anglo-Norman Literature: A Guide to Texts and Manuscripts (1999) has won widespread praise for its substantial contribution to the study of literature.

== Biography ==
Ruth Dean was born in New York City on March 10, 1902. She attended Wellesley College, graduating with a B.A. in 1922. She subsequently attended Saint Hugh's College, Oxford, earning a B.A. in 1924, an M.A. in 1928, and a D.Phil in 1938. During her time at Oxford, Dean had the opportunity to work alongside eminent medievalists: she was research assistant to the notable palaeographer E. A. Lowe, and moreover studied for her doctorate under Mildred Pope. It was also during this time that she met Dominica Legge, with whom she enjoyed a lifelong friendship until her death in 1986. After returning to America, Dean joined the faculty of Mount Holyoke College, where she served as a French language and literature professor until her retirement in 1967. She chaired her department from 1951 to 1954 and was named the Mary Lyon Professor in 1967. After her retirement, Dean taught at the University of Pennsylvania, where she chaired the Medieval Studies program. In 1973, she was elected president of the Medieval Academy of America. Ruth Dean died in 2003.

Dean was at the Institute for Advanced Study for the academic years 1943–1944 and 1950–1951. She was a Guggenheim Fellow for the academic year 1948–1949.

== Legacy ==
For much of her career, Dean was a passionate advocate for the study of Anglo Norman both as a body of literature and as a language. This can be seen particularly in her essay 'A Fair Field Needing Folk: Anglo-Norman', written in 1954, where she paints a picture of scholarly neglect of Anglo Norman as a field of study:

Anglo-Normanists often feel that their subject has been treated in the world of research as stepchild, Cinderella, poor relation, even barbarian. In France, the descendants of its paternity consider it, at its best, an ornament or even a chapter of French literature, and compliment it on contributing joy, light, and color to the gloomy Anglo-Saxon scene; the more it takes on local characteristics the less attention the French pay to it'

Dean finished her manifesto with these words:

A definitive study of Anglo-Norman language, literature, and ideas in western culture is still some way off. Here is a field for many workers and a training-ground for rising scholars who should go on, from their philological, paleographical, and literary grounding, to make critical evaluations and eventually to compose the larger interpretations for non-specialists which are now recognized as part of the role of scholars.

Indeed, she made such a vast undertaking more feasible for many Anglo Norman scholars through her life's work, Anglo-Norman Literature: A Guide to Texts and Manuscripts, compiled with the collaboration of Maureen Boulton and published by the Anglo-Norman Text Society. Dean's Guide has been referred to as an 'indispensable catalogue of manuscripts of Anglo-Norman literary texts and manuscripts'. This work was based on an earlier survey of manuscripts undertaken by Johan Vising, a copy of which was given to Dean by a fellow medievalist during her years of study at Oxford. Dean herself writes that with this volume in hand, she began to explore manuscripts, library catalogues, and bibliographies with a view to updating Vising's work. Dean's survey, which came to be known as the 'new Vising', attracted the attention of scholars on five continents, many of whom contributed to its growth and development. This collaborative effort, coordinated by Dean, in actuality greatly surpassed the efforts of Vising. Anglo-Norman Literature: A Guide to Texts and Manuscripts catalogues close to 1,000 texts, over 500 more than are recorded in Vising, and the number of manuscripts in which they are found exceeds 1,100, whilst Vising only lists 419. The colossal advance to scholarship represented by the volume was awarded by the Prix Chavée by the Académie des Inscriptions et Belles Lettres in 2001.

Dean's Guide has been described as 'a substantial addition to knowledge [...] simply irreplaceable'. Elsewhere, the extraordinary effort behind Dean's scholarly contribution has also been highlighted:

‘In another environment, this book might have issued from the collaborative work of a large industrious committee: it is in fact a testament to the life-long passion of a nonagenarian, a work that should take its rightful place as a monument of national culture [...] This is truly a monumentum aere perennius for Ruth J. Dean, who devoted more than seventy years to it before her death at the age of ninety-nine. It is also a monument to her surviving collaborator, Maureen B. Boulton, and a great gift to the rest of us.’[16]

It has, since publication, become the standard reference work in Anglo Norman studies.

== Select bibliography ==
- Dean, Ruth J. 'A Fair Field Needing Folk: Anglo-Norman', PMLA, Vol. 69, No. 4 (Sep., 1954), pp. 965–978
- Editor with M. Dominica Legge. The Rule of Saint Benedict: A Norman Prose Version. Medium Aevum Monographs, 7. Oxford: Basil Blackwell, 1964.
- Dean, Ruth J.. “The fair field of Anglo-Norman: recent cultivation.” Medievalia et humanistica, n.s., vol. 3, 1972, pp. 279–297.
- Dean, Ruth J. ‘Nicholas Trevet, historian.’, in Medieval Learning and Literature: Essays presented to Richard William Hunt., ed. by J.J.G. Alexander and M.T. Gibson (Oxford: Clarendon Press, 1976), pp. 328–352.
