= Mary Stocks, Baroness Stocks =

British writer (1891–1975)

The Right Honourable The Baroness Stocks
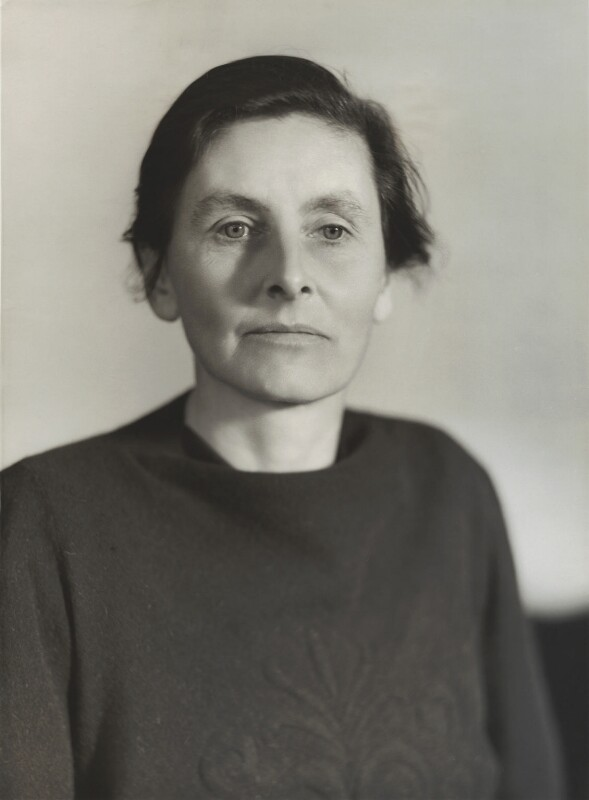
- Stocks in 1938
- Born: Mary Danvers Brinton; 25 July 1891; London, England
- Died: 6 July 1975 (aged 83); Kensington, London, England
- Occupation: Writer
- Known for: Involvement with women's suffrage, welfare state, and social work
- Spouse: John Leofric Stocks (m. 1913; died 1937)
- Children: 3
- Relatives: Tim Brinton (cousin); Baroness Brinton (cousin)

Mary Danvers Stocks, Baroness Stocks (née Brinton; 25 July 1891 – 6 July 1975) was a British writer. She was closely associated with the Strachey, the Wedgwood and the Ricardo families. Her family was deeply involved in changes in the Victorian Era and Stocks herself was deeply involved in women's suffrage, the welfare state, and other aspects of social work.

== Early and personal life ==
Stocks was born in London, the daughter of a general practitioner, Roland Danvers Brinton. Politicians Tim Brinton and Sal Brinton, Baroness Brinton are cousins of Stocks.

Her mother Constance (née Rendel) was related to Elinor Strachey (1859–1944), who married Constance's brother James Rendel, as well thereby to Philippa Strachey and her more famous brother Lytton. She attended St Paul's Girls' School. She campaigned for women's suffrage, and joined Millicent Fawcett's moderate National Union of Women's Suffrage Societies (NUWSS) which later became the National Union of Societies for Equal Citizenship (NUSEC). She attended the London School of Economics (LSE), graduating in 1913 with a first-class degree in economics.

She married the philosopher John Leofric Stocks in December 1913. He was a fellow of St John's College, Oxford. They had one son and two daughters.

== Career ==
During the First World War, Mary Stocks taught at the LSE and King's College, London, while her husband served with in France with the King's Royal Rifle Corps; he was awarded the Distinguished Service Order.

She was a member of the NUWSS committee; she campaigned for family allowances (finally granted in 1945) and for birth control; she was also an editor of the NUSEC journal Woman's Leader, supported the ordination of women priests, and equal pay for women. She also opposed restrictive women's clothing: as a matter of practicality, she did not wear a hat or make-up, preferred flat shoes, and kept her hair short. She became involved with the Workers' Educational Association.

After the war, she moved to Oxford with her husband and taught economic history at Somerville College and Lady Margaret Hall. The family moved to Manchester in 1924, where her husband became a professor of philosophy. She was a magistrate in Manchester from 1930 to 1936. The family moved again to Liverpool in 1937 where her husband was briefly vice-chancellor for 6 months.

After her husband died suddenly in 1937, Stocks moved back to London and became secretary of the London Council of Social Service. In 1939, she became Principal of Westfield College where she remained, including a period when the college was temporarily relocated to Oxford during the Second World War, until she retired in 1951.

She served on a number of official government committees, often as the only woman. In 1932-33, she served on a Royal Commission investigating the regulation of gambling.

== Politics ==
Stocks contested the London University seat at the 1945 general election as an Independent Progressive. Her opponent was the sitting MP who stood as an independent supporter of the Churchill government. She came within 149 votes of winning.

Stocks contested a seat for the Combined English Universities at the 1946 Combined English Universities by-election as an Independent candidate. The by-election was caused by the death of Eleanor Rathbone (president of the NUSEC, whose biography Stocks wrote in 1949). She was the runner-up amongst five candidates.

== Later life and death ==
Stocks obtained wider public recognition in later life, when she became a radio broadcaster and appeared frequently on Any Questions?, on quiz shows and gave religious talks.

She eventually retired to the House of Lords, having been created a life peer as Baroness Stocks, of the Royal Borough of Kensington and Chelsea on 17 January 1966, where she initially took the Labour Party whip before becoming a cross-bencher in 1974. She wrote her autobiography. She was commissioned to write a book on the first 50 years of the WEA (Workers Educational Association) which had been founded in 1903, published in 1953.

She received several honorary doctorates, including ones from Manchester University in 1955, Liverpool University in 1956, and Leeds University in 1957. She was a member of the advisory committee to the Anti-Concorde Project.

Brian Harrison recorded 2 oral history interviews with Stocks, in April and May 1974, as part of the Suffrage Interviews project, titled Oral evidence on the suffragette and suffragist movements: the Brian Harrison interviews. In them she talks about her participation in the NUWSS and reasons for joining, as well as her relationships with other prominent names in the suffrage movement, such as Christabel Pankhurst, Emmeline and Frederick Pethick-Lawrence, Philippa Strachey and Elizabeth Macadam. The collection also contains interviews with both of Stocks’ daughters, Helen Stocks and Ann Patterson, and with Rosalind Hill and Christina Barratt who worked with Stocks at Westfield College.

She died in Kensington in July 1975, shortly before her 84th birthday.

In 2017, she featured in a conference, London's Women Historians, held at the Institute of Historical Research.

== Bibliography ==
- Fifty Years in Every Street
- Eleanor Rathbone
- History of the Workers' Educational Association
- A One Hundred Years of District Nursing
- Ernest Simon of Manchester (UK)
- Unread Best-seller
- My Commonplace Book – autobiography
- The Workers Educational Association: The First Fifty Years

== See also ==
- List of Life Peerages
