= Dominica Legge =

British scholar of Anglo-Norman

Mary Dominica Legge
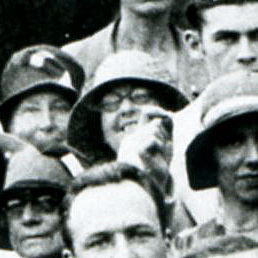
- with glasses in Truro in 1930
- Born: 26 March 1905; Bayswater, London, England
- Died: 10 March 1986 (aged 80); Oxford, Oxfordshire, England
- Education: Somerville College, Oxford

Mary Dominica Legge, FBA (26 March 1905 – 10 March 1986) was a British scholar of the Anglo-Norman language.

== Life ==
Legge was born in Bayswater in 1905. Her grandfather was Professor James Legge, and her father James Granville Legge was the Director of Education in Liverpool.

Legge received an education at Liverpool College in Huyton before attending Somerville College, Oxford where she specialised in Medieval French, and in particular the Anglo-Norman language, under the guidance of Mildred Pope. She was awarded a BLitt in 1928 for her thesis on the Lumiere as lais and thereafter became an editor for the Selden Society. In 1930 Legge attended the first International Arthurian Congress in Truro, Cornwall, where she, Henry Jenner, Eugène Vinaver, Roger Sherman Loomis and other scholars investigated Arthurian legends. Legge was appointed Mary Somerville research fellow in 1935, and in 1937 she became a founding member of the Anglo-Norman Text Society. She was also one of the first members of the Somerville College Boat Club. In 1938, Legge became assistant lecturer in French at Royal Holloway College, University of London, she was subsequently appointed assistant lecturer in French at University College, Dundee in 1942. She was then Professor of French (Anglo-Norman Studies) at the University of Edinburgh, 1968-1973 and Professor Emerita after her retirement.

Legge's reputation as a scholar was widely acknowledged by the academic community through election to various fellowships. She was elected a fellow of the Royal Historical Society in 1942, a fellow of the Society of Antiquaries of Scotland in 1958, corresponding fellow of the Medieval Academy of America in 1971, and Fellow of the British Academy (FBA) in 1974. In 1971 the French government appointed her an officer of the Ordre des Palmes académiques.

Legge has been described as "extremely generous and supportive to students and young colleagues", and she would often invite them to her small flat at 204 Dalkeith Road, Edinburgh, "the walls of which were covered with pictures mostly of late nineteenth- and early twentieth-century artists, including George du Maurier and J. B. Yeats; there they would be offered tea or coffee and warned to be careful with the cups because 'Oscar Wilde drank from them'."

In her retirement, Legge continued to be academically active, attending conferences and continuing to undertake research.

Legge died in Oxford on 10 December 1986.

== Selected works ==
- Anglo-Norman letters and petitions from All Souls. Ms. 182, Oxford 1941
- Le Roman de Balain. A prose romance of the thirteenth century With an introduction by Eugène Vinaver, Manchester 1942
- Anglo-Norman in the cloisters. The influence of the orders upon Anglo-Norman literature, Edinburgh 1950
- Anglo-Norman Literature and its Background (Oxford, 1963)
- with Ruth J. Dean) The Rule of St. Benedict. A Norman prose version, Oxford 1964
- The significance of Anglo-Norman. Inaugural lecture, Edinburgh 1969
- "William the Marshal and Arthur of Brittany", Historical Research, volume 55, 1982
