= Henry Strauss, 1st Baron Conesford =

British lawyer and politician

The Right Honourable The Lord Conesford QC
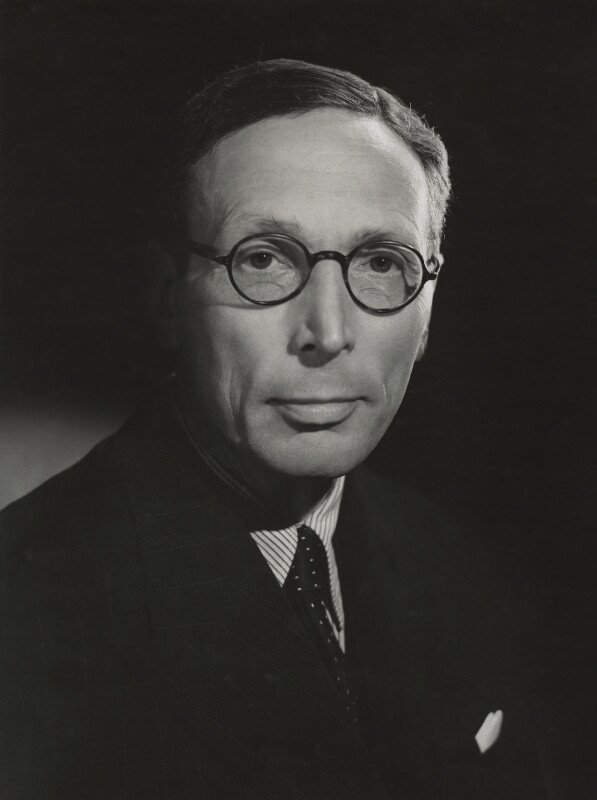
- Lord Conesford

Member of Parliament for Norwich South
- In office 23 February 1950 – 6 May 1955
- Preceded by: New constituency
- Succeeded by: Geoffrey Rippon

Member of Parliament for Combined English Universities with Kenneth Lindsay
- In office 18 March 1946 – 3 February 1950
- Preceded by: Eleanor Rathbone and Kenneth Lindsay
- Succeeded by: Constituency abolished

Member of Parliament for Norwich with Geoffrey Shakespeare
- In office 14 November 1935 – 15 June 1945
- Preceded by: George Hartland and Geoffrey Shakespeare
- Succeeded by: John Paton and Lady Noel-Buxton

Personal details
- Born: 24 June 1892 Kensington, London, England
- Died: 28 August 1974 (aged 82)
- Party: Conservative
- Spouse: Anne Sadelbia Mary (m. 1927)
- Education: Rugby School
- Alma mater: Christ Church, Oxford

Henry George Strauss, 1st Baron Conesford, QC (24 June 1892 – 28 August 1974) was a British lawyer and a Conservative politician.

== Background and education ==
He was born at 19 Pembridge Gardens, Kensington, London, on 24 June 1892. He was the only son of Alphonse Henry Strauss, general merchant, and his wife, Hedwig Aschrott. He was educated at Rugby and Christ Church, Oxford, and was called to the Bar, Inner Temple, in 1919. He briefly served during World War I, but was discharged because of health problems and continued working in Whitehall.

== Political career ==
Strauss sat as Member of Parliament for Norwich between 1935 and 1945, for the Combined English Universities between 1946 and 1950 and for Norwich South between 1950 and 1955. He was Parliamentary Private Secretary (PPS) to the Attorney General, Sir Donald Somervell, between 1936 and 1942 and a government member as Parliamentary Secretary to the Ministry of Works between March and December 1942 and as Parliamentary Secretary to the Ministry of Town and Country Planning between 1942 and 1945, when he resigned from the government in protest at Churchill's treatment of Poland at the Yalta agreement. He was once again a government member as Parliamentary Secretary to the Board of Trade under Churchill between 1951 and 1955. The latter year he was raised to the peerage as Baron Conesford, of Chelsea in the County of London.

In 1946 he published the book Trade Unions and the Law connected with treatment of Poland by Yalta agreements. From 1964 - 1970 he was the Chairman of the Association of Independent Unionist Peers. He also was the President of the Architectural club.

Lord Conesford became a Queen's Counsel (QC) in 1964 and a Bencher of the Inner Temple in 1969. He was also a member of the governors of Norwich High School for Girls and a vice-president of the Girls' Day School Trust. He was well known for his speeches in which he complained about the improper usages of the English language, especially in the United States, as can be seen in a Time magazine article from 1957.

== Personal life ==
Lord Conesford married Anne Sadelbia Mary, daughter of Bowyer Nichols, in 1927. He died in August 1974, aged 82, when the barony became extinct.

Parliament of the United Kingdom
Preceded by George Hartland; Geoffrey Shakespeare	Member of Parliament for Norwich; 1935–1945; With: Geoffrey Shakespeare	Succeeded by John Paton; Lady Noel-Buxton
Preceded by Eleanor Rathbone; Kenneth Lindsay	Member of Parliament for Combined English Universities; 1946–1950; With: Kenneth Lindsay	Constituency abolished
New constituency	Member of Parliament for Norwich South; 1950–1955	Succeeded by Geoffrey Rippon
Preceded by George Hicks	Parliamentary Secretary to the Ministry of Works; 1942	Office renamed
New title	Parliamentary Secretary to the Ministry of Town and Country Planning; 1942–1945	Succeeded by Arthur Jenkins
Preceded by Hervey Rhodes	Parliamentary Secretary to the Board of Trade; 1951–1955	Succeeded by Donald Kaberry
Peerage of the United Kingdom
New creation	Baron Conesford; 1955–1974	extinct
