= Edith Marvin =

British inspector of schools

- Born: 29 July 1872; Attington, England
- Died: 20 May 1958 (aged 85); Berkhamsted, England
- Education: Somerville College, Oxford
- Occupation: Inspector of schools

Edith Mary Marvin, born Edith Mary Deverell (29 July 1872 – 20 May 1958) was a British inspector of schools.

== Life ==
Marvin was born in Attington, near Tetsworth, in 1872. Her parents, Mary Seymour and Alfred Deverell JP, were Congregationalists. Her father was a farmer and he also sold coal. She was educated at home until she attended a private school in Weston-super-Mare. In 1892, she gained access to Somerville College, Oxford where she graduated in Modern History, but did not receive a degree because she was a woman. While she was there in 1894 she was one of the seven founding members of the "Associated Prigs". This was the unofficial name of the discussion group that met on Sundays evenings. The first meeting was in her room. They never agreed a name or leader but the group would keep notes and the links established were valuable after they left Somerville. Other founder members were Mildred Pope and Eleanor Rathbone and other early members were Margery Fry and Hilda Oakeley. Marvin left Somerville in 1895 and took an MA from Trinity College Dublin.

Arthur Lyon Bowley, who was later known for his British economic statistics, began this study in the 1890s with work on trade and on wages and income. His 1900 publication Wages in the United Kingdom in the Nineteenth Century was created using the unpaid assistance of Melvin when she was a researcher at the London School of Economics from 1896 to 1898. She then returned to her alma mater to still work as a researcher.

In 1900 she began her career in school inspection as a "woman sub-inspector" employed by the Board of Education. She was looking at girls schools and infant schools and she was unimpressed by the conditions she found firstly in Liverpool and then later in London. In April 1901 she was made a junior inspector together with several other women. She argued that Britain should follow the French model and require children to run or march during their morning break. She ceased to be inspector in 1904, but she carried through her ideas within the National Union of Women Workers. She argued that teachers needed to trained in physiology. She argued that the health of children could also her improved by appointing more female school inspectors and female school managers. Marvin belonged to the committee which presented the Women Graduate Suffrage Petition to the Liberal Prime Minister Henry Campbell-Bannerman in May 1906.

Marvin died in Berkhamsted in 1958.

== Private life ==
She married Francis Sydney Marvin at Tetsworth parish church on 25 June 1904. He was a leading member of the English Positivists. Her new husband proposed a Positivist wedding ceremony conducted by Frederic Harrison but she objected when she realised that it included a poor attitude to gender equality. Their three sons included John Deverell Marvin who became a financial journalist.
