= Combined English Universities =

Parliamentary constituency in the United Kingdom, 1918–1950

- Former university constituency for the House of Commons

1918–1950
- Seats: 2

Combined English Universities was a university constituency represented in the United Kingdom Parliament (from 1918 until 1950). It was formed by enfranchising and combining all the English universities, except for Cambridge, Oxford and London which were already separately represented. The constituency effectively represented the red brick universities and Durham University with two members of parliament.

== Boundaries ==
This university constituency was created by the Representation of the People Act 1918 and abolished in 1950 by the Representation of the People Act 1948.

The original proposal of the Speaker's Conference, which considered electoral reform before the 1918 legislation was prepared, was to combine all the English and Welsh universities except for Oxford and Cambridge into a three-member constituency. However, during consideration of the legislation, it was agreed that London University alone should continue to return one member. The University of Wales was also given its own seat. The other universities, which were still to be combined, had their proposed representation reduced to two members.

Combined English Universities was not a physical area. Its electorate consisted of the graduates of the universities included in the seat.

The universities represented by this constituency were Birmingham, Bristol, Durham, Leeds, Liverpool, Manchester, Reading (from August 1928) and Sheffield.

The constituency returned two members of Parliament, elected at general elections by the single transferable vote method of proportional representation. However, the first past the post system was used in by-elections.

== Members of Parliament ==
This is a list of people who were elected to represent these English universities in the Parliament of the United Kingdom between 1918 and 1950. The elections were not held on the polling dates for general elections in the territorial constituencies. The university constituency elections were held over five days, not on the ordinary polling date, so that plural voting graduates could vote in their place of residence and then visit their university to participate in its election.

- Constituency created (1918)

Election	First member	First party	Second member	Second party
1918	H. A. L. Fisher	Coalition Liberal	Sir Martin Conway	Coalition Conservative
1922	H. A. L. Fisher	National Liberal	Sir Martin Conway	Conservative
1923	H. A. L. Fisher	Liberal	Sir Martin Conway	Conservative
1926 by-election	Sir Alfred Hopkinson	Conservative	Sir Martin Conway	Conservative
1929	Eleanor Rathbone	Independent	Sir Martin Conway	Conservative
1931	Eleanor Rathbone	Independent	Sir Reginald Craddock	Conservative
1937 by-election	Eleanor Rathbone	Independent	Edmund Harvey	Independent Progressive
1945	Eleanor Rathbone	Independent	Kenneth Lindsay	Independent
1946 by-election	Henry Strauss	Conservative	Kenneth Lindsay	Independent
1950	University constituencies abolished			

== Elections ==
There were six contested STV elections. The MPs in 1935 were returned unopposed. By-elections, to fill a single seat, used the first past the post or relative majority electoral system.

1910s – 1920s – 1930s – 1940s –

=== Elections in the 1910s ===
General Election 1918: Combined English Universities (2 seats)
Party		Candidate	FPv%	Count		
Party		Candidate	FPv%	1	2	3
C	Liberal	H. A. L. Fisher	48.09	959		
C	Unionist	Martin Conway	15.20	303	465	777
	Labour	John A. Hobson	18.36	366	454	481
	Unionist	Herbert Williams	18.36	366	410	eliminated
Electorate: 2,357 Valid: 1,994 Quota: 665 Turnout: 84.60%
C indicates candidate endorsed by the coalition government.

=== Elections in the 1920s ===
General Election 1922: Combined English Universities (2 seats)
Party	Candidate	FPv%	Count				
Party	Candidate	FPv%	1	2	3	4	5
Unionist	Martin Conway	32.8	968	982	1,093		
National Liberal	H. A. L. Fisher	27.7	819	821	849	883	1,009
Independent	John Strong	19.4	571	575	595	611	813
Labour	Leonard Woolf	12.2	361	361	365	366	eliminated
Ind. Unionist	Wilfred Barnard Faraday	4.8	141	206	eliminated		
Ind. Unionist	Sidney C. Lawrence	3.1	90	eliminated			
Electorate: 3,967 Valid: 2,946 Quota: 983 Turnout: 74.3%

General election 1923: Combined English Universities (2 seats)
Party	Candidate	Votes	%	±%
Unionist	Martin Conway	1,711	44.1	+11.3
Liberal	H. A. L. Fisher	1,316	34.0	+5.3
Labour	Joseph John Findlay	850	21.9	+9.7
Total votes		3,877		
Quota		1,293		
Turnout		5,008	77.4	+3.1

- As two candidates achieved the quota only one count was necessary

General Election 1924: Combined English Universities (2 seats)
Party	Candidate	FPv%	Count	
Party	Candidate	FPv%	1	2
Unionist	Martin Conway	50.4	2,231	
Liberal	H. A. L. Fisher	30.1	1,333	2,064
Labour	Joseph John Findlay	19.5	861	885
Electorate: 5,655 Valid: 4,425 Quota: 1,476 Turnout: 78.2%

1926 Combined English Universities by-election
Party	Candidate	Votes	%	±%
Unionist	Alfred Hopkinson	2,343	53.9	+3.5
Liberal	Ramsay Muir	2,000	46.1	+16.0
Majority		343	7.8	N/A
Turnout		4,343	66.7	−11.5
Registered electors		6,513		
Unionist gain from Liberal		Swing		

Rathbone

Conway

General Election 1929: Combined English Universities (2 seats)
Party	Candidate	FPv%	Count	
Party	Candidate	FPv%	1	2
Unionist	Martin Conway	26.8	2,679	4,321
Independent	Eleanor Rathbone	33.3	3,331	3,394
Liberal	Robert Seymour Conway	22.3	2,231	2,281
Unionist	Amherst Selby-Bigge	17.6	1,762	eliminated
Electorate: 13,775 Valid: 10,003 Quota: 3,335 Turnout: 72.6%

=== Elections in the 1930s ===
General Election 1931: Combined English Universities (2 seats)
Party	Candidate	FPv%	Count			
Party	Candidate	FPv%	1	2	3	4
Independent	Eleanor Rathbone	37.2	5,096			
Conservative	Reginald Craddock	26.5	3,633	3,685	3,754	4,858
National Labour	William Jowitt	20.1	2,759	3,003	3,207	3,632
Conservative	Herbert Williams	12.8	1,748	1,819	1,922	eliminated
New Party	Harold Nicolson	3.4	461	623	eliminated	
Electorate: 19,109 Valid: 13,697 Quota: 4,567 Turnout: 71.7%

General election 1935: Combined English Universities (2 seats)
Party	Candidate	Votes	%	±%
Conservative	Reginald Craddock	Unopposed	N/A	N/A
Independent	Eleanor Rathbone	Unopposed	N/A	N/A

1937 Combined English Universities by-election
Party	Candidate	Votes	%	±%
Independent Progressive	Edmund Harvey	6,596	47.4	New
Conservative	Francis Oswald Lindley	4,952	35.6	N/A
Independent Liberal	Henry Britten Brackenbury	2,373	17.0	New
Majority		1,644	11.8	N/A
Turnout		13,921	48.3	N/A
Registered electors		28,808		
Independent Progressive gain from Conservative		Swing	N/A	

=== Elections in the 1940s ===
General election 1945: Combined English Universities (2 seats)
Party	Candidate	FPv%	Count				
Party	Candidate	FPv%	1	2	3	4	5
Independent Progressive	Eleanor Rathbone	53.3	11,176				
Independent	Kenneth Lindsay	9.2	1,923	3,503	3,856	4,528	5,826
Independent Labour	Stanley Wormald	15.3	3,212	3,973	4,081	4,473	4,675
National	Eric Cuthbert Arden	11.6	2,433	3,073	3,389	3,829	eliminated
Independent	John Henry Richardson	5.3	1,124	1,995	2,341	eliminated	
Independent	A.R. Foxall	5.3	1,105	1,437	eliminated		
Electorate: 41,976 Valid: 20,973 Quota: 6,992 Turnout: 50.0%

By-election 13–18 March 1946: Combined English Universities
Party	Candidate	Votes	%	±%
Conservative	Henry Strauss	5,483	30.0	New
Independent Progressive	Mary Stocks	5,124	28.0	−25.3
Independent Liberal	Ernest Simon	4,028	22.0	New
Independent Labour	Stanley Wormald	3,414	18.7	+3.4
British People's	Gerard Stephen Oddie	239	1.3	New
Majority		359	2.0	N/A
Turnout		18,288	42.1	−7.9
Registered electors		43,438		
Conservative gain from Independent		Swing		
