= Walter Francis Rice =

Lieutenant Governor of Burma (1871–1941)

Walter Francis Rice CSI (12 April 1871 – 21 March 1941) was a Scottish civil servant and British colonial administrator who served as interim Lieutenant Governor of the British Crown Colony of Burma from September 1917 to February 1918.

== Early life ==
Rice was born in Ceres, Fife, one of nine surviving children of Col. Cecil Rice of the Seaforth Highlanders, and his first wife, Frances Anne "Fanny" Napier (1848–1884), descendant of the 6th Lord Napier. His father married secondly Lady Matilda Horatia Seymour, daughter of Admiral Sir George Seymour and sister to Francis Seymour, 5th Marquess of Hertford.

He was educated at Morrison's Academy in Crieff, Perth and Kinross, before going to Balliol College, Oxford.

== Career ==
He passed the India Civil Service examination in 1890 and two years later was sent to Burma. In 1900, he served as Secretary to the Government, and in 1907 was selected Chief Secretary by Lieutenant-Governor Sir Herbert Thirkell White. He served as Lieutenant- Governor for four months while awaiting the arrival of Sir Reginald Craddock. In April 1919, he went to India to serve as Additional Secretary in the Home Department of the Government of India, and stayed on special duty there until his retirement in 1922.

He was appointed a Companion of the Order of the Star of India (CSI) in the 1910 Birthday Honours.

Preceded by Sir Spencer Harcourt Butler	Lieutenant Governor of British Crown Colony of Burma; 1917–1918	Succeeded by Sir Reginald Henry Craddock

== Personal life ==
He died in London in 1941.
