= Martin Conway, 1st Baron Conway of Allington =

British politician (1856–1937)

The Right Honourable The Lord Conway of Allington Kt FSA FRGS
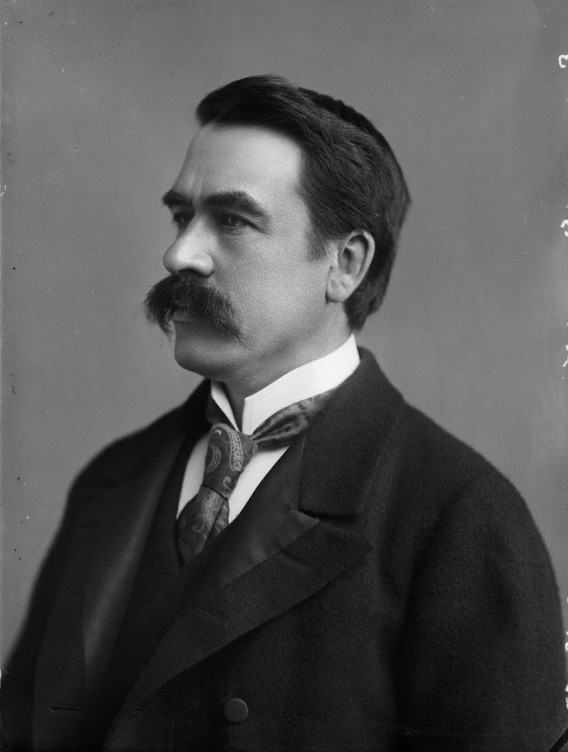
- Conway in 1895

Member of Parliament for Combined English Universities with H. A. L. Fisher (1918–1926) and Eleanor Rathbone (1926–1931)
- In office 28 December 1918 – 7 October 1931
- Preceded by: Constituency Established
- Succeeded by: Sir Reginald Craddock and Eleanor Rathbone

Personal details
- Born: 12 April 1856 Rochester, Kent, England
- Died: 19 April 1937 (aged 81) London, England
- Children: Agnes Conway
- Occupation: Art critic, politician, mountaineer

William Martin Conway, 1st Baron Conway of Allington, Kt, FSA, FRGS (12 April 1856 – 19 April 1937), known between 1895 and 1931 as Sir Martin Conway, was an English art critic, politician, cartographer and mountaineer, who made expeditions in Europe as well as in South America and Asia.

Conway occupied several university positions and from 1918 to 1931 was a representative of the Combined English Universities as a conservative member of the House of Commons.

In 1872 he took up mountain climbing and went on expeditions to Spitsbergen from 1896 to 1897 and the Andes of Bolivia in 1898. He is an author of books on art and exploration, which include Mountain Memories (1920), Art Treasures of Soviet Russia (1925), and Giorgione as a Landscape Painter (1929).

== Background and education ==
Conway was born at Rochester, England, on 12 April 1856, the son of Reverend William Conway, who later became rector of St Margaret's, Westminster. He was the youngest of three children, having two older sisters, Elizabeth Ann (1852–1916) and Martha (1854–1938). He was educated at Repton and Trinity College, Cambridge, where he studied mathematics and became a close friend of Karl Pearson. It is also at Cambridge that he met Henry Bradshaw, then a librarian, and John Ruskin, who introduced Conway to art and the Alps. He became interested in woodcuts, engraving and early printed books; his History of the Woodcutters of the Netherlands in the Fifteenth Century was published in 1884.

== Mountaineering ==
Conway was a member of the Alpine Club, of which he was president from 1902 to 1904.

In 1892, in the course of an exploring and mountaineering expedition undertaken under the auspices of the Royal Society, the Royal Geographical Society and the British Association, he made an ascent of a subsidiary summit of Baltoro Kangri (now in Gilgit-Baltistan, Pakistan), claiming a world altitude record with a height of 23,000 ft (7,010 m). However, subsequent measurements have revised his height to 22,322 ft (6,804 m).

In 1896–97, accompanied by J. W. Gregory and others, he explored the interior of Spitsbergen, the first expedition to cross the mainland of the island. The following year he explored and surveyed the Bolivian Andes, climbing "Sorata" (known today as Ancohuma, 21,086 ft / 6,427 m) and Illimani (21,122 ft / 6,438 m). He also attempted Aconcagua (22,831 ft / 6,959 m), stopping short of the summit by 50 feet; and explored Tierra del Fuego, attempting Sarmiento. At the Paris Exhibition of 1900, he received the gold medal for mountain surveys, and in 1905 won a Founder's Medal of the Royal Geographical Society for his Spitsbergen exploration.

He served as president of the Alpine Club from 1902 to 1904, and became the first president of The Alpine Ski Club at its inaugural meeting in 1908, serving until 1911. Conway Island is named after him.

In 1924, Conway evaluated evidence from the 1924 British Mountaineering Expedition and believed George Mallory and Andrew Irvine had reached the summit of Mt. Everest.

== Academic career ==
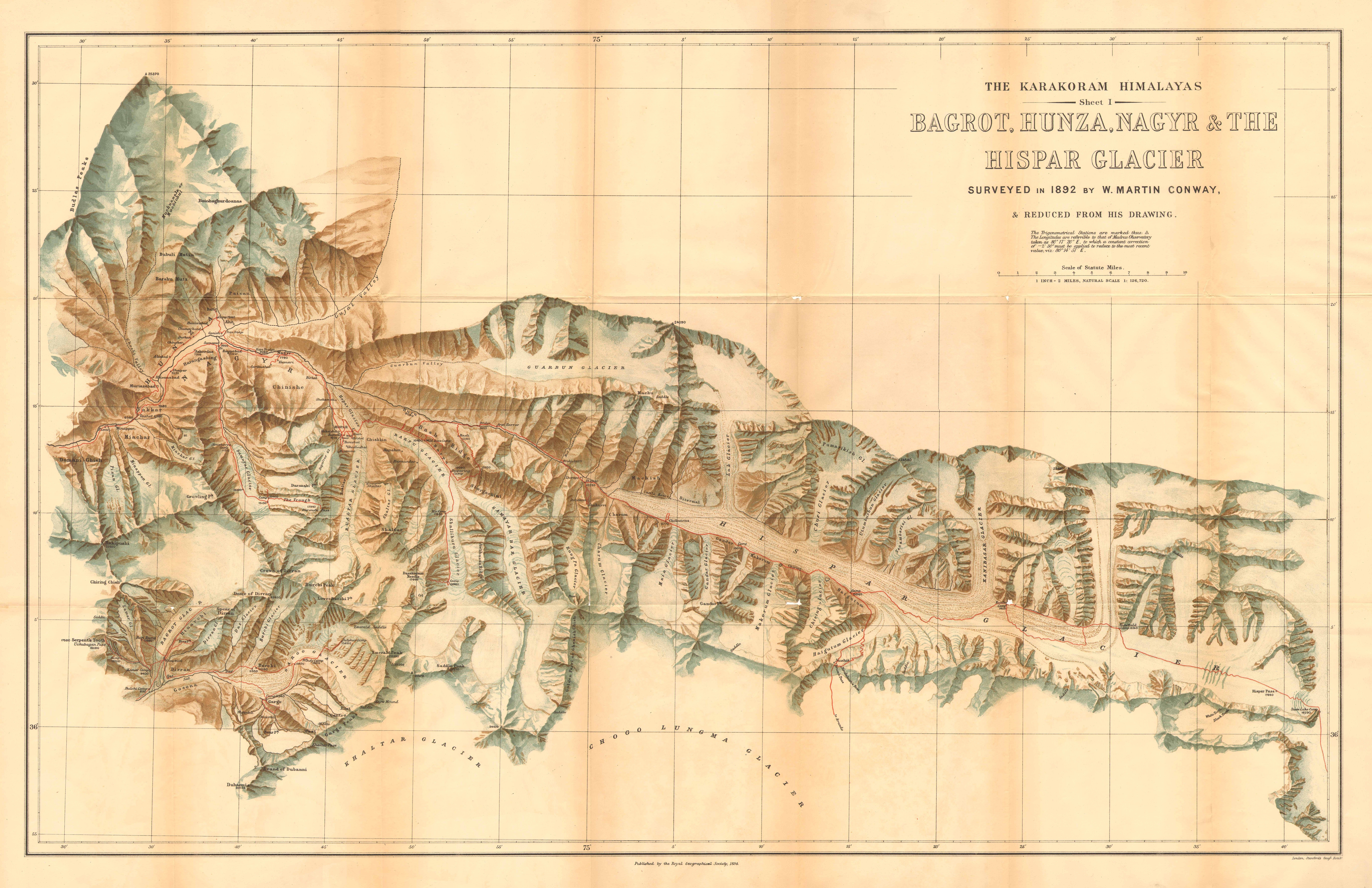
Conway's Karakoram map showing the environs of the Hispar Glacier, based on his 1892 survey

From 1884 to 1887 Conway was a Professor of Art at University College, Liverpool; and from 1901 to 1904 he was Slade Professor of Fine Art at Cambridge University. He was knighted in 1895 for his efforts in mapping 5,180 square km of the Karakoram Range in the Himalayas three years earlier.

In 1889 he published a book concerning his research on Albrecht Dürer. He was assisted in this by the polymath Lina Eckenstein who was the sister of a fellow mountaineer.

During the early 1900s, he was active within the Society of Antiquaries of London. He gave many presentations at meetings and served multiple terms on its council, once in 1916–17, and again from 1918–22 as a vice president of the society.

He also stood as president of the Kent Archaeological Society for some time in the 1920s and 1930s. He became president of the society in 1923, and announced in 1930 his wish to step down, citing declining health, although he continued as president after a request by the council. He again announced his retirement and stepped down in 1936, though he agreed to continue as a vice president.

Conway was an art collector; he began collecting in 1887. Conway was the first Director-General of the Imperial War Museum and a trustee of the National Portrait Gallery from 1922 to 1937. His photograph collection formed the basis of the Conway Library at the Courtauld Institute of Art in London. He was also responsible for the restoration of Allington Castle in Kent.

== Political career ==
Conway had been involved in politics for some time, consorting with both major parties allegedly in pursuit of a knighthood and a barony; he received both. He was mentioned as a possible Liberal candidate for Wolverhampton South in early 1900, but withdrew his candidature 'owing to domestic circumstances'. In May 1901he attended the annual general meeting of the Imperial Liberal Council, and in November 1901 was cited in The Times as being one of seven vice-presidents of the Liberal Imperialist League. In 1902 Conway was involved in a deal with Bolivian president José Manuel Pando regarding a tract of land named the Caupolican concession, which was rich in rubber. The concession was divided between Conway and American investors that were interested in the Acre region. In 1907, Conway became a director of The Inambari Para-Rubber Estates Limited, which exported latex products from the Inambari River in Peru. He was elected Unionist Member of Parliament for the Combined English Universities in 1918, serving until 1931, when he was raised to the peerage as Baron Conway of Allington, of Allington in the County of Kent, in the Dissolution Honours.

He died in London on 19 April 1937. The title became extinct on his death.

== Works ==
=== Scholarly works ===
- History of the Woodcutters of the Netherlands in the Fifteenth Century, 1884
- Early Flemish Artists, 1887
- The Literary Remains of Albrecht Dürer, 1889
- The Dawn of Art in the Ancient World, 1891, dealing with Chaldean, Assyrian and Egyptian art
- Early Tuscan Art, 1902
- The Crowd in Peace and War, 1915
- Art Treasures of Soviet Russia, 1925
- Giorgione as a Landscape Painter, 1929

=== Mountaineering and travel works ===
- Climbing and Exploration in the Karakoram-Himalayas, 1894
- The Alps from End to End, 1895 and 1900 (Also published as The Alps, 1904 and 1910)
- The First Crossing of Spitsbergen, 1897
- The Bolivian Andes, 1901
- Aconcagua and Tierra Del Fuego: A Book of Climbing, Travel and Exploration, 1902
- Early Dutch and English Voyages to Spitsbergen in the Seventeenth Century, 1904
- No Man's Land, a History of Spitsbergen from its discovery in 1596 to the beginning of the Scientific Exploration of the Country, 1906
- Mountain Memories, 1920
- Palestine and Morocco, 1923

=== Autobiography ===
- Episodes in a Varied Life, 1932
- The Sport of Collecting, 1914

Parliament of the United Kingdom
New constituency	Member of Parliament for Combined English Universities; 1918–1931; With: H. A. L. Fisher 1918–1926; Eleanor Rathbone 1926–1931	Succeeded by Sir Reginald Craddock; Eleanor Rathbone
Peerage of the United Kingdom
New creation	Baron Conway of Allington; 1931–1937	Extinct
