= Edmund Harvey (social reformer) =

British politician (1875–1955)

Member of Parliament for Leeds West
- In office 1910 – 25 November 1918
- Preceded by: Herbert Gladstone
- Succeeded by: John Murray

Member of Parliament for Dewsbury
- In office 6 December 1923 – 9 October 1924
- Preceded by: Ben Riley
- Succeeded by: Ben Riley

Member of Parliament for Combined English Universities
- In office 22 March 1937 – 15 June 1945
- Preceded by: Sir Reginald Henry Craddock, Eleanor Rathbone
- Succeeded by: Kenneth Martin Lindsay, Eleanor Rathbone

Personal details
- Born: Thomas Edmund Harvey; 4 January 1875 Leeds, England
- Died: 3 May 1955 (aged 80)
- Party: Liberal; Independent Progressive
- Spouse: Alice Irene Thompson (after 1911)
- Relations: W. F. Harvey (brother)
- Education: University of Berlin; Sorbonne
- Alma mater: Yorkshire College, Leeds; Christ Church, Oxford

Thomas Edmund Harvey (4 January 1875 – 3 May 1955), generally known as Ted or Edmund Harvey, was an English museum curator, social reformer and politician. He sat in Parliament, first as a Liberal and later as an Independent Progressive. He was also a prolific writer on Christianity and the role and history of the Society of Friends.

== Early life ==
Harvey was born in Leeds to a prominent Quaker family. He was the eldest son of William Harvey, a teacher and art collector, who made a substantial gift of paintings by Dutch and Flemish masters to the nation, as well as being a local politician, serving for 13 years on Leeds City Council. His brother was the writer William Fryer Harvey, best known for his short story The Beast with Five Fingers that was turned into a film of the same name, starring Peter Lorre.

Harvey was educated at Bootham School in York and attended Yorkshire College, Leeds and Christ Church, Oxford. He also studied at the University of Berlin and the Sorbonne in Paris, as well as at other institutions overseas. In 1900 he received his MA degree from Oxford University with First Class honours in Literae Humaniores. He later received an honorary Doctorate of Laws from Leeds University.

== Career ==
In 1900, Harvey enrolled as an assistant at the British Museum, where he worked until 1904. However, he was also deeply interested in social reform and welfare, especially the alleviation of poverty, educational and prison reform issues. He chose to pursue this work through the settlement movement, and was a resident of Toynbee Hall from 1900, Deputy Warden from July 1904 and became Warden of Toynbee Hall, 1906–1911. From 1906 to 1910 he was a member of the Central (Unemployed) Body for London, the organisation responsible for registering those unemployed men applying for unemployment relief and finding work for them.

From 1920 to 1921, he was Warden of Swarthmore Settlement in Leeds. Harvey was among a number of reformers, including R. H. Tawney and Harvey's predecessor as Warden of Toynbee Hall, Canon Samuel Augustus Barnett, who recognised that the emphasis of settlement work needed to be moved away from the simple provision of relief and help and towards a wider agenda based upon social investigation, the raising of public awareness of social problems and broader political legislation.

== Politics ==
Harvey's politics were strongly linked to his religious and social beliefs. He was elected to the London County Council for Finsbury East as a Progressive and served 1904–1907, during which time he sat on the Education Committee. He was also an elected member of Stepney Borough Council 1909–1911.

=== West Leeds ===
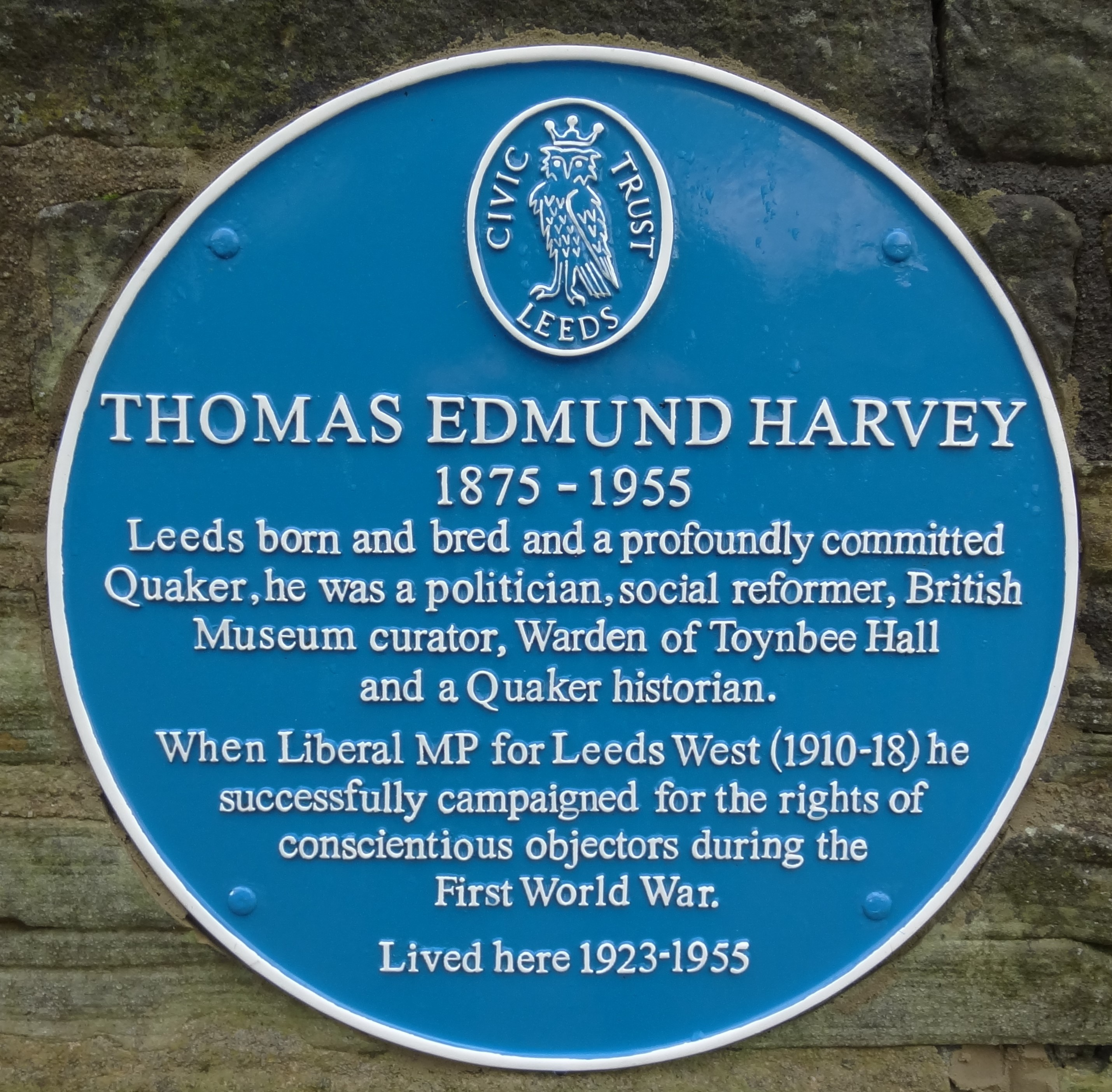
Blue plaque on his house in Headingley, Leeds

Harvey first stood for Parliament at the January 1910 United Kingdom general election, for Leeds West, holding Herbert Gladstone's old seat for the Liberals by a majority of 3,315 votes. He retained Leeds West at the December 1910 general election, increasing his majority to 4,270.

While an MP, Harvey was a member of the Standing Committee on Boy Labour in the Post Office (1910–1917). He acted as unpaid Parliamentary Private Secretary to Ellis Ellis-Griffith KC, Under-Secretary of State at the Home Office, and performed the same role for Charles Masterman, Chancellor of the Duchy of Lancaster, 1913–1914, although he resigned the post on the outbreak of the First World War.

=== Pacifism and conscientious objection ===
As a Quaker, Harvey was placed in a difficult personal position by Britain's declaration of war in August 1914. Quakers traditionally took the view that all war is incompatible with the spirit and teachings of Christ. Harvey was a pacifist and profoundly wished to keep Britain out of the war and supported those elements in the government, particularly the Foreign Secretary, Sir Edward Grey, who were working to prevent a general war. Harvey remained one of the small band of Liberals, at that time still including Norman Angell and E D Morel, who had grave doubts about the war.

Throughout the First World War and until 1920 Harvey, in the Quaker tradition, engaged personally in relief work in the war zone in France, on behalf of the War Victims’ Relief Committee of the Society of Friends. But Harvey's dilemma over support for the government, as distinct from his religious beliefs, surfaced when he and another Liberal Quaker MP, Arnold Stephenson Rowntree, helped to draft the section of the Military Service Act 1916 that provided for the possibility of conscientious objectors being required to perform work of national importance as a condition of exemption from service in the army. There was disagreement among Quakers about the sort of service, if any, which conscientious objectors should be asked to do, and Harvey and Rowntree were accused of arrogating to themselves the right to specify what objectors might do and of misrepresenting to the authorities the extent to which they could speak for Quaker opinion. He also served as a member of the Pelham Committee (formally, the Committee on Work of National Importance), the body charged in March 1916 with trying to find suitable civilian occupations for conscientious objectors prepared to undertake the work of national importance he had helped to be written into the Military Service Act.

=== Dewsbury ===
Harvey stood down from Parliament at the 1918 general election, but tried to re-enter the House of Commons in 1922, having in 1921 been selected as Liberal candidate for Dewsbury in the West Riding of Yorkshire. Dewsbury had been Sir Walter Runciman's seat up until 1918, when, as an opponent of the Coalition government of David Lloyd George, Runciman had been opposed by a Coalition Conservative who had the benefit of the government coupon. In a three-cornered contest Harvey nearly regained the seat for the Liberals in 1922, but lost to Labour candidate Ben Riley by 756 votes (3.3% of the total vote), the Conservative candidate Osbert Peake, later to be MP for Leeds North came third.

Harvey was, however, returned to Parliament for Dewsbury at the 1923 general election, when he defeated Riley in a straight fight to win by a majority of 2,256 votes. At the 1924 general election the situation was again reversed. This time Riley won the seat back, and in a three-cornered contest Harvey fell to the bottom of the poll.

=== 1929–1937 ===
Harvey did not stand for election in Dewsbury again. For the 1929 general election he returned to his old stamping ground of Leeds. On this occasion he abandoned Leeds West, where Liberal candidates had come bottom of the poll at the last three general elections, trying Leeds North instead. He was not successful, coming third in a three-way fight with his old antagonist Osbert Peake winning the seat for the Tories.

Harvey continued to support the Liberal Party, being sometime Yorkshire representative on the National Liberal Federation but he did not stand for Parliament in the general elections of 1931 or 1935.

=== MP for the Combined English Universities ===
In 1937 Harvey was chosen as a candidate in a by-election for the Combined English Universities seat. He stood as an Independent Progressive candidate, saying that contests for the university seats ought to be fought on ideas and not on party political lines. Against him were Conservative and Independent rivals, but Harvey won with a majority of 1,644 votes. He retained his links with Liberalism, however – the party leader Sir Archie Sinclair, Ramsay Muir and the Liberal Party Organisation all sent messages of congratulation to Harvey when he won the by-election. He held the Combined English Universities seat until the 1945 general election, when he stood down from Parliament for the last time, aged 70.

During his time in Parliament as an Independent, and consistent with his representation of a university seat, Harvey championed the plight of foreign academics and scientists forced by various regimes to flee as refugees.

=== Other appointments ===
Retaining his lifelong interest in social reform, Harvey was a Master of the charitable trust the Guild of St George 1934–51. Harking back to his museum work and because of his father's gift of paintings to the nation, Harvey also served as the Chairman of the National Loan Collection Trust, the body set up to co-ordinate the lending of pictures to municipal and other provincial art galleries.

Harvey served on the Humanitarian League's executive committee.

== Personal life ==
In 1911 he married Alice Irene Thompson, the daughter of the eminent physicist Professor Silvanus P. Thompson FRS.

Bust of Thomas Edmund Harvey by Marcus Harvey (sculptor), from the Brotherton Library at the University of Leeds

Harvey died at his home, Rydal House, Grosvenor Road, Leeds on 3 May 1955 aged 80 years.

=== Legacy ===
Harvey's correspondence with conscientious objectors from 1916 to 1920; Pelham Committee papers, and other correspondence are available in the Friends Library in London. Some of Harvey's family correspondence can also be seen at Leeds University Library in the collection of papers relating to the Harvey family of Leeds.

== Publications ==
- Poor Raoul and Other Fables – J M Dent & Co, London, 1905
- The Rise of the Quakers – in Nonconformity, Volume 5, 1905
- A London Boy’s Saturday – St George Press, Bournville, 1906
- A Wayfarer’s Faith; aspects of the common basis of religious life – Wells, Gardner & Co, London, 1913
- The Long Pilgrimage: Human Progress in the Light of the Christian Hope – Robert Davis, Harrogate, 1921
- Stolen Aureoles: Legends for the First Time now Collected Together – Basil Blackwell, Oxford, 1922
- Silence and Worship: A Study in Quaker Experience – Swarthmore Press, London, 1923
- The Heart of Quakerism – Friends’ Book Centre, London, 1925
- Along the Road of Prayer – Friends’ Book Centre, London, 1929
- The Lost Sacrament – Friends’ Book Centre, London, 1930
- Goodness and God – Friends’ Book Centre, London, 1931
- St Aelred of Rievaulx – H R Allenson, London,1932
- Authority and Freedom in the Experience of Quakers – Friends’ Home Service Committee, London, 1935
- The Divine Message – Woodbrooke Extension Committee, Birmingham, 1938
- The Christian Citizen and the State – Friends’ Book Centre, London, 1939
- The Christian Church and the Prisoner in English Experience – Epworth Press, London, 1941
- Songs in the Night – M T Stevens, Malvern, 1942
- Workaday Saints – Bannisdale Press, London, 1949
- Thomas Shillitoe, 1754–1836: Some hitherto unpublished particulars – Friends’ Historical Society, London, 1950

== See also ==
- List of members of London County Council 1889 - 1919

Parliament of the United Kingdom
Preceded by Herbert Gladstone	Member of Parliament for Leeds West; January 1910 – 1918	Succeeded by John Murray
Preceded by Ben Riley	Member of Parliament for Dewsbury; 1923 – 1924	Succeeded by Ben Riley
Preceded by Sir Reginald Henry Craddock; Eleanor Rathbone	Member of Parliament for Combined English Universities; 1937 – 1945; With: Eleanor Rathbone	Succeeded by Kenneth Martin Lindsay; Eleanor Rathbone
