= Reginald Craddock =

British politician (1864–1937)

Sir Reginald Henry Craddock GCIE KCSI MP
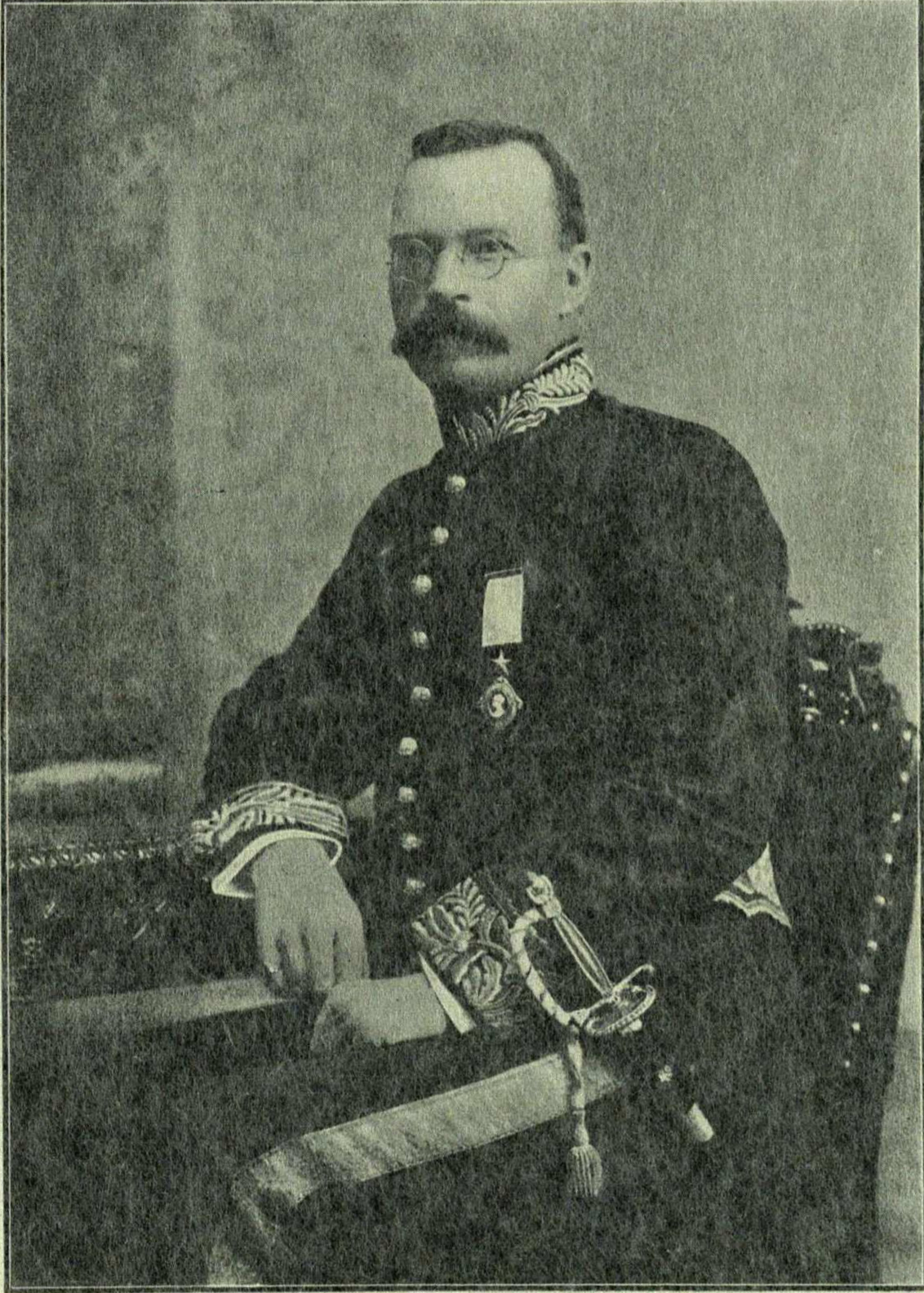

Member of Parliament
- In office 1931–1937
- Constituency: Combined English Universities

Lieutenant-governor of Burma
- In office 15 February 1918 – 21 December 1922
- Preceded by: Walter Francis Rice
- Succeeded by: Harcourt Butler

Personal details
- Born: 11 March 1864 Dharmsala, India
- Died: 10 February 1937 (aged 72) Westminster
- Party: Conservative Party (UK)
- Relations: William Craddock
- Education: Wellington College, Keble College, Oxford
- Occupation: Civil Servant; politician

Sir Reginald Henry Craddock, GCIE, KCSI (11 March 1864 – 10 February 1937) was a British colonial official and politician, who served in the Indian Civil Service and as Lieutenant-governor of Burma. He later became a Conservative Party Member of Parliament (MP) and sat on the Joint Committee on Indian Constitutional Reform as a strong opponent of Indian nationalism.

== Life ==
Craddock's father Surgeon Major William Craddock had been attached to the 1st Gurkha Rifles; he was therefore born into a family with strong links to the British Raj. He studied at the prestigious Wellington College before going on to Keble College, Oxford. He qualified for the Indian Civil Service in 1882, and two years later was sent on his first posting to the Central Provinces.

Craddock spent many years in the Central Provinces, moving steadily up the civil service ladder. He was an industrious worker and his diligence was duly recognized by the authorities. From 1893 onwards, he held the following positions in succession: Commissioner of Excise; head of the Nagpur District; Chief Secretary to the head of the Province; Commissioner of the Nagpur Division; and finally Chief Commissioner (or governor of the province) in 1907.

He was appointed a Companion of the Order of the Star of India (CSI) in the 1903 Durbar Honours, and in 1911 promoted to a Knight Commander in the order (KCSI). In 1923 he was appointed a Knight Grand Commander in the Order of the Indian Empire (GCIE).

At the 1931 general election, he was elected as Member of Parliament for the Combined English Universities, and held the seat until his death in 1937.

== Titles ==
- 1864–1902: Reginald Henry Craddock
- 1903–1911: Reginald Henry Craddock, CSI
- 1911–1923: Sir Reginald Henry Craddock, KCSI
- 1923–1937: Sir Reginald Henry Craddock, GCIE, KCSI

== Publications ==
- Craddock, R. H.; Sharpe, H. (1898). Report on the Famine in the Central Provinces, in 1896 and 1897. Vol. 1. Nagpur: Secreteriat Press – via Internet Archive.
- Craddock, R. H.; Hutcheson, G. (1898). Report on the Famine in the Central Provinces, in 1896 and 1897. Vol. 2. Nagpur: Secreteriat Press – via Internet Archive.
- Craddock, Reginald (1924). Speeches by Sir Reginald Craddock, 1917-1922. Rangoon: Supdt., Govt. Printing and Stationery, Burma – via HathiTrust.
- Craddock, Reginald (1929). The Dilemma in India (2nd ed.). London: Constable & Co. – via Internet Archive.
- Craddock, Reginald Henry (1930). "The Indian Scene: II. The Report and After". The Nineteenth Century and After. Vol. 108, no. 642. London. pp. 160–168.

Parliament of the United Kingdom
Preceded by Martin Conway and Eleanor Rathbone	Member of Parliament for Combined English Universities; 1931–1937; With: Eleanor Rathbone	Succeeded by Thomas Edmund Harvey and Eleanor Rathbone
Government offices
Preceded by John Ontario Miller	Chief Commissioner of the Central Provinces; 1907–1912	Succeeded by Sir Benjamin Robertson
Preceded by Walter Francis Rice	Lieutenant Governor of British Crown Colony of Burma; 1918–1922	Succeeded by Sir Spencer Harcourt Butler
