= 1946 Combined English Universities by-election =

UK parliamentary by-election

The 1946 Combined English Universities by-election was a parliamentary by-election held on 18 March 1946 for the British House of Commons constituency of Combined English Universities.

There was no Labour Party candidate, which did not occur again in a Great Britain by-election in the UK until the 2008 Haltemprice and Howden by-election. It was the penultimate election in a university constituency to the British Parliament and the final one to occur in England, with all university constituencies abolished in 1950.

The winning candidate vote share of 30 per cent holds the record for being the lowest in a UK by-election.

== Previous MP ==
The seat had become vacant when the constituency's independent Member of Parliament (MP), Eleanor Rathbone, died. She had been the constituency's MP since the 1929 general election.

== Result ==
The Conservative Party gained the seat.

By-Election 13–18 March 1946: Combined English Universities
Party	Candidate	Votes	%	±%
Conservative	Henry Strauss	5,483	30.0	New
Independent Progressive	Mary Stocks	5,124	28.0	−25.3
Independent Liberal	Ernest Simon	4,028	22.0	New
Independent Labour	Stanley Wormald	3,414	18.7	+3.4
British People's	Gerard Stephen Oddie	239	1.3	New
Majority		359	2.0	N/A
Turnout		18,288	42.1	−7.9
Registered electors		43,438		
Conservative gain from Independent		Swing		
