= Elizabeth Macadam =

Elizabeth Macadam (10 October 1871 – 25 October 1948) was, along with her close friend Eleanor Rathbone, a leading figure within the National Union of Women's Suffrage Societies and its successor body, the National Union of Societies for Equal Citizenship. Macadam was also an important figure in the professional development of social work.

== Early life ==
Elizabeth Macadam was born on 10 October 1871, in the village of Chryston outside Glasgow. Her father, Revd Thomas Macadam, was a minister in the Free Church of Scotland, and her mother, his wife, was Elizabeth Whyt.

Macadam spent part of her childhood in Canada. Her father served as the minister of St Andrew's Presbyterian Church in Strathroy, Ontario. He later became professor of political philosophy at Morrin College, in Quebec City.

Following the death of her mother and the retirement of her father, Elizabeth and her sister Margaret returned to Scotland as young women.

== Career ==
In the late nineteenth century, Macadam spent time in Germany where she worked in a kindergarten.

In 1898 Macadam was awarded a Pfeiffer scholarship and trained in social work at the Women's University Settlement in Southwark, London. During the four years that she spent at the settlement, Macadam helped to run an evening school for approximately hundred adolescent boys and girls.

Macadam served as the warden of the Victoria Women's Settlement in Liverpool, between 1902 and 1910. In this position, she worked alongside Eleanor Rathbone, with whom she would subsequently become close friends.

=== Development of social work ===
Macadam was a strong advocate for the professional development of social work. In 1904 the Victoria Women's Settlement in Liverpool began a training programme for social workers. This included lectures on poverty, child welfare, and civic administration. These courses were complemented by opportunities for practical work experience with municipal and voluntary associations. In 1910 Liverpool University took over the running of this programme. Macadam was the first lecturer on the methods and practice of social work. By 1914, more than 100 students were enrolled on the course.

=== First World War ===
In 1916, and at the request of the Ministry of Munitions, Macadam helped to devise training courses for welfare workers.

=== Inter-war ===
In 1919, Macadam left Liverpool permanently for London. She became secretary of the newly established Joint University Council for Social Studies. In the same year, Rathbone became president of the National Union of Societies for Equal Citizenship (NUSEC). Macadam became an NUSEC officer and was involved in editing its paper, the Woman's Leader.

Macadam also supported Rathbone in campaigning for family allowances.

== Personal life ==
At the end of the First World War, Macadam and Eleanor Rathbone bought a house together and moved to 50 Romney Street, London. The house suffered bomb damage in 1940, so the two friends moved to a flat at 5 Tufton Court, where they lived until April 1945 They moved to 26 Hampstead Lane in Highgate, where they lived together until Rathbone's sudden death in January 1946.

Following the death of Rathbone, Macadam returned to Edinburgh, where she spent the rest of her life. Macadam died of cancer on 25 October 1948.

== Bibliography ==
- 1914 - The Universities and the Training of the Social Worker
- 1921 - The Case for Equal Franchise
- 1925 - The Equipment of the Social Worker
- 1934 - The New Philanthropy
- 1945 - The Social Servant in the Making
