= Anglo-Norman Text Society =

Text publication society for Anglo-Norman literature

- Abbreviation: ANTS
- Formation: 1937
- Founder: Mildred Pope
- Founded at: Manchester
- Legal status: Active
- Fields: Medieval studies, Anglo-Norman language, Anglo-Norman literature, Textual criticism
- Presidents: Ian Short, Tony Hunt
- Hon. Secretary: Daron Burrows
- North American Treasurer: Maureen Bolton
- Website: http://www.anglo-norman-texts.net

The Anglo-Norman Text Society is a text publication society founded in 1937 by Professor Mildred K. Pope. The founding aim of the society was to promote the study of Anglo-Norman language and Anglo-Norman literature by facilitating the publication of reliable scholarly editions of a broad range of texts of literary, linguistic, historical and legal value and interest. Based in the United Kingdom, the Society draws individual and institutional members from across the world.

== Publications ==
=== Annual Texts series ===
The original series of publications launched by the Society was the Anglo-Norman Texts series, sometimes referred to as the Annual Texts series. The aim of this series was to produce an edition each year (or one volume of a multi-volume edition each year), yet while this rhythm has generally been maintained throughout the Society's history, unforeseen circumstances have on occasion led to minor delays or gaps in this schedule. The series has featured editions by some of the most renowned Anglo-Norman specialists of their time, including Mildred Pope, M. Dominica Legge, Alexander Bell, Ronald C. Johnson, Anthony J. Holden, Brian Merrilees, Ian Short, Tony Hunt, and Delbert Russell. For a list of publications in this series, see Annual Texts | Anglo-Norman Text Society

=== Plain Texts series ===
The Annual Texts series was complemented by the launch of two additional series in 1983. The first of these was the Plain Texts series, which has the goal of providing a critical text predominantly for shorter works, but without the more detailed introduction and notes provided in the Annual Texts series. Foe a list of publications in this series, see Plain Texts | Anglo-Norman Text Society

=== Occasional Publications series ===
The second series was the Occasional Publications series, which, as the name suggests, has been reserved for publications falling outside the remit of the other series. The first release in this series was a volume of essays compiled in memory of the Society's long-serving President, T. B. W. Reid. The series also features Anglo-Norman Literature: a Guide to Texts and Manuscripts by Ruth J. Dean with Maureen B. M. Boulton and Ian Short's Manual of Anglo-Norman, which builds on the final section of Pope's From Latin to Modern French, with Especial Consideration of Anglo-Norman (Manchester: Manchester University Press, 1934; revised reprints 1952 and 1956). It is also in this series that Holden, Gregory, and Crouch's edition of the History of William Marshal appeared, an account of the life and adventures of the famous William Marshal, 1st Earl of Pembroke. For a list of publications in this series, see Occasional Publications | Anglo-Norman Text Society
