= Mildred K. Pope =

English philologist (1872–1956)

Mildred Katherine Pope (28 January 1872 – 16 September 1956) was an English scholar of Anglo-Norman England. She became the first woman to hold a readership at Oxford University, where she taught at Somerville College.

== Biography ==
Mildred Pope was educated at Edgbaston High School, Birmingham. She read French at Somerville College, Oxford, and in 1893 was placed in the first-class of the Oxford University women's examination. Interested in Old French philology, as an undergraduate "she had to rely mainly on tuition by correspondence from Paget Toynbee at Cambridge". She taught at Somerville College, Oxford, first as a librarian, and from 1894 as a lecturer. She spent the 1894 summer vacation studying with Fritz Neumann at Heidelberg. In that year she was one of the seven founding members of the Associated Prigs. This was the unofficial name of the discussion group that met on Sundays evenings. They never agreed a name or leader but the group would keep notes and the links established were valuable after they left Somerville. Other founder members included Eleanor Rathbone and Edith Marvin.

In 1902-3 she spent a sabbatical year working in Paris under Gaston Paris and Paul Meyer, gaining a doctoral degree from the University of Paris in 1904, with a dissertation on Frère Angier.

Given Oxford's policy on admitting women she was not granted a degree from Oxford until after World War I. She was appointed lecturer, then university reader (in 1928—the first woman at Oxford to achieve that position), and became vice-principal of Somerville in 1929. She left Oxford for Manchester in 1934 and was later honored with emeritate. At the University of Manchester, she was appointed professor of French language and romance philology. In 1939, she became the first woman to receive an honorary doctorate from a French university, in her case the University of Bordeaux. After her death in 1956, The Oxford Magazine, in an obituary, called her one of Somerville's "oldest, most distinguished and well-loved members."

== Legacy ==
Pope taught a number of notable medievalists including Eugène Vinaver, Dominica Legge and Dorothy Sayers; the character Miss Lydgate in Sayers' Gaudy Night (1935) is based on Pope. One of her most enduring achievements was the foundation in 1937 of the Anglo-Norman Text Society, a learned society dedicated to the promotion of the study of Anglo-Norman language and literature which is still operating today. In the Society's Annual Texts series, she contributed to critical editions of La Seinte Resureccion and the Romance of Horn. Her most important publication was From Latin to Modern French, with Especial Consideration of Anglo-Norman (Manchester: Manchester University Press, 1934; revised reprints 1952 and 1956), which over seventy years after its original publication has been described as 'classic and still indispensable'.

== Works ==
- Life of the Black Prince, By Chandos Herald. Oxford: Clarendon Press, 1910. Editor, with Eleanor C. Lodge.
- From Latin to modern French, with especial consideration of Anglo-Norman; phonology and morphology, 1934
- (ed. with T. Atkinson Jenkins, J. M. Manly and Jean G. Wright) La seinte resureccion from the Paris and Canterbury mss, Oxford, Pub. for the Anglo-Norman Text Society, 1943
- The Anglo-Norman element in our vocabulary: its significance for our civilization, Manchester: Manchester University Press, 1944
- (ed.) The romance of Horn, 2 vols., Oxford: Pub. for the Anglo-Norman Text Society, 1955-64.
