= Eugène Vinaver =

Russian-born British scholar (1899–1979)

- Евгений Максимович Винавер
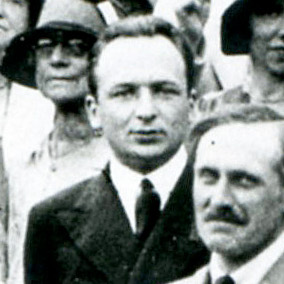
- Vinaver in 1930
- Born: Yevgeniĭ Maksimovich Vinaver; 18 June 1899; Saint Petersburg, Russia
- Died: 21 July 1979 (aged 80); Kent, England
- Spouse: Elizabeth Malet Vaudrey (m. 1939)
- Children: 1

Academic background
- Education: Oxford University
- Thesis: Le Roman de Tristan et Iseut dans l'oeuvre de Thomas Malory (1925)
- Doctoral advisor: Joseph Bédier and Alfred Jeanroy
- Other advisor: Mildred Pope

Academic work
- Discipline: Medieval literature
- Sub-discipline: Chivalric romance, Arthurian literature
- Institutions: University of Manchester
- Notable works: Le Morte d'Arthur

Eugène Vinaver (Russian: Евгений Максимович Винавер Yevgeniĭ Maksimovich Vinaver, 18 June 1899 – 21 July 1979) was a Russian-born British literary scholar who is best known today for his edition of the works of Sir Thomas Malory.

== Early life ==
Vinaver was born in Saint Petersburg, the son of Jewish-Russian lawyer, national politician, and Jewish community leader Maxim Vinaver, who emigrated to France in 1919.

Eugene Vinaver studied at the École pratique des hautes études in Paris, where he was a pupil of Joseph Bédier.

== Life in England ==
From the late 1920s, he lived in England (one of his teachers was Mildred Pope) and in 1933 he was appointed Professor of French Language and Literature at the University of Manchester. He received his doctorate from Oxford University in 1950.

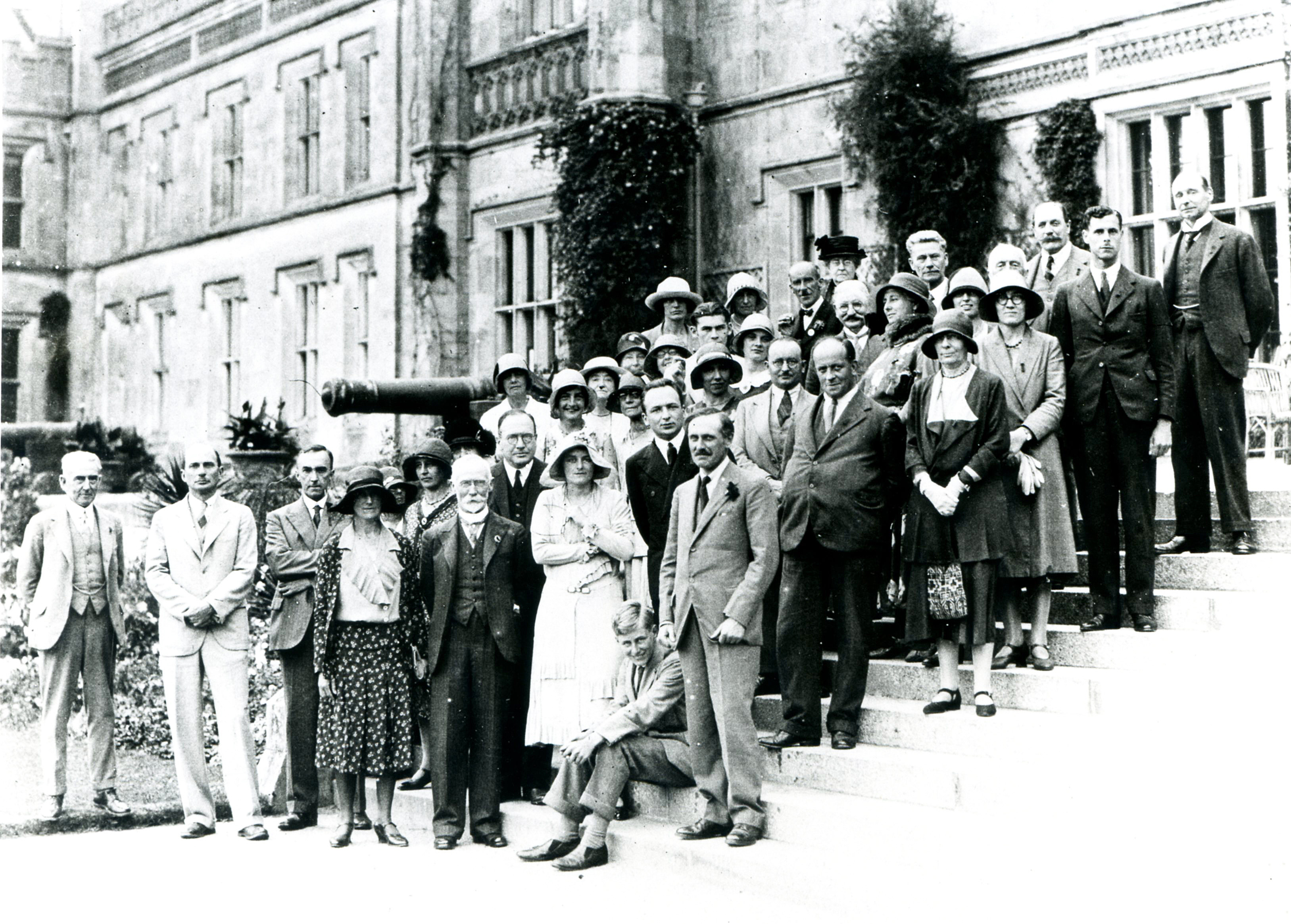
The Arthurian congress at Truro in Cornwall, 1930

In 1928, Vinaver founded in Oxford the Arthurian Society, which published two volumes under the title Arthuriana (1929, 1930). This society was renamed the Society for the Study of the Medieval Languages and Literatures. Arthuriana became Medium Aevum. In 1948, the International Arthurian Society was organized by Eugène Vinaver and Jean Frappier.

In 1947, Eugène Vinaver published a new edition of Malory's Morte d'Arthur, based on the 15th-century Winchester Manuscript which W.F. Oakeshott had discovered in the Fellows' Library at Winchester College in 1934. He noted the structural differences between the text in the manuscript and Caxton's edition of Morte d'Arthur, such as chapter headings and divisions, and wording changes.

In addition to his interest in Arthurian legend, Vinaver was also a recognised authority on Racine and Flaubert.

Vinaver was a correspondent member of the British Academy, laureate of the French Academy of Sciences, and the Medieval Academy of America, and a foreign member of Académie royale de langue et de littérature française of Belgium. He was awarded the Order of the Legion of Honor.

Vinaver died in Kent on 21 July 1979 of malignant lymphoma.

== Selected works ==
- French translation of the Russian lyrics to Lazare Saminsky's opera La Galliarde d'une Peste Joyeuse, 1924
- The Works of Sir Thomas Malory (three volumes), 1947, 1967 (second edition)
- The Works of Sir Thomas Malory (one volume), 1954
- Form and Meaning in Medieval Romance, 1966
- À la recherche d'une poétique médiévale, 1970
- The Rise of Romance, 1971
