= John Henry Richardson =

British academic

John Henry Richardson CMG (1 July 1890 – 8 June 1970) was a British academic. An economics professor at the University of Leeds who visited the Soviet Union in the early 1930s.

General Election 1945: Combined English Universities (2 seats)
Party	Candidate	FPv%	Count				
Party	Candidate	FPv%	1	2	3	4	5
Independent	Eleanor Florence Rathbone	53.3	11,176				
Independent	Kenneth Martin Lindsay	9.2	1,923	3,503	3,856	4,528	5,826
Independent Labour	Stanley Wormald	15.3	3,212	3,973	4,081	4,473	4,675
National	Eric Cuthbert Arden	11.6	2,433	3,073	3,389	3,829	eliminated
Independent	John Henry Richardson	5.3	1,124	1,995	2,341	eliminated	
Independent	A.R. Foxall	5.3	1,105	1,437	eliminated		
Electorate: 41,976 Valid: 20,973 Quota: 6,992 Turnout: 50.0%
