= Kenneth Lindsay =

British politician

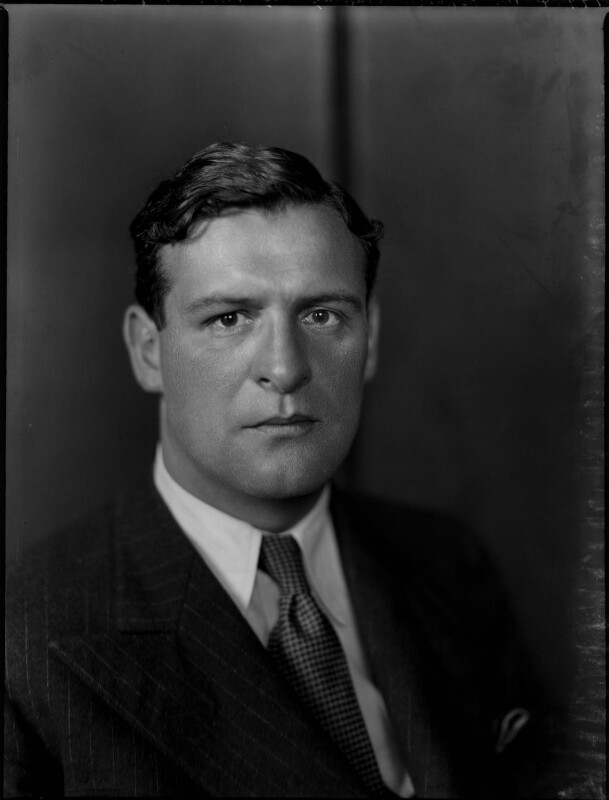

Parliamentary Secretary to the Board of Education
- In office 1937–1940
- Preceded by: Geoffrey Shakespeare
- Succeeded by: James Chuter Ede

Member of Parliament for Combined English Universities with Eleanor Rathbone 1945–1946 Henry Strauss 1946–1950
- In office 5 July 1945 – 23 February 1950
- Preceded by: Eleanor Rathbone and Edmund Harvey
- Succeeded by: Constituency abolished

Member of Parliament for Kilmarnock
- In office 2 November 1933 – 5 July 1945
- Preceded by: Craigie Aitchison
- Succeeded by: Clarice Shaw

Personal details
- Born: 16 September 1897
- Died: 4 March 1991 (aged 93)
- Party: Labour (until 1931); National Labour (1931–43); National Independent (1943–45); Independent (since 1945)

Kenneth Martin Lindsay (16 September 1897 – 4 March 1991) was a Labour Party politician from the United Kingdom who joined the breakaway National Labour group. He was the final Member of Parliament to be elected by the single transferable vote.

== Life ==
Lindsay was born in Forest Hill, south London, the son of a Stock Exchange clerk. He attended St Olave's Grammar School, Southwark, and after serving in the Honourable Artillery Company during the First World War (where he was wounded at the third battle of Ypres) studied modern history at Worcester College, Oxford. While at Oxford, Lindsay gained a blue in association football, co-founded the University Labour Club, and was President of the Oxford Union in 1921–22.

Upon coming down with a second-class degree, he was made a Barnett research fellow at Toynbee Hall and engaged in social work in the East End of London. In 1929 he moved to Whitehall, first working in the Dominions Office and then, after 1931, as the general secretary of the newly formed research organisation, Political and Economic Planning.

Yet throughout this period Lindsay had sought a political career. In 1923, standing as a Labour candidate, he was elected to Stepney Borough Council, serving until 1926. He then unsuccessfully contested the Oxford constituency at the 1924 by-election, Harrow at the 1924 general election and Worcester in 1929. When the Labour Party split in 1931 and Prime Minister Ramsay MacDonald formed a National Government with the Conservative Party, Lindsay followed MacDonald into the breakaway National Labour group.

In 1933, Craigie Aitchison, the National Labour Member of Parliament (MP) for Kilmarnock, was appointed as a judge, vacating his seat. At the resulting by-election on 2 November, Lindsay defeated the Labour candidate, and was re-elected comfortably at the 1935 general election. He held the seat until 1945, but left National Labour in 1943 and thereafter sat as a National Independent. He was Civil Lord of the Admiralty from 1935 to 1937, and Parliamentary Secretary to the Board of Education from 1937 to 1940.

He did not contest Kilmarnock at the 1945 general election, but was elected as an independent member for the Combined English Universities, holding the seat until the university constituencies were abolished for the 1950 general election.

After leaving parliament, Lindsay became an enthusiastic propagandist for the cause of European unity. In 1958 he wrote Towards a European Parliament, a book about the Council of Europe and the Consultative Assembly, and after presiding over a conference on the matter at The Hague produced another book on a similar theme, European Assemblies (1960). He was also director of the Anglo-Israel Association from 1962 to 1973.

== Bibliography ==
- Social Progress and Educational Waste (1926)
- English Education (1941)
- Towards a European Parliament (1958)
- European Assemblies: the experimental period, 1949–1959 (1960)
- The First Twenty-Five years of the Anglo-Israel Association (1973)

Parliament of the United Kingdom
Preceded by Craigie Mason Aitchison	Member of Parliament for Kilmarnock; 1933–1945	Succeeded by Clarice Marion McNab Shaw
Preceded by Eleanor Rathbone and Thomas Edmund Harvey	Member of Parliament for Combined English Universities; 1945–1950; With: Eleanor Rathbone to 1946; Henry Strauss, 1946–1950	Constituency abolished
Political offices
Preceded by Geoffrey Shakespeare	Parliamentary Secretary to the Board of Education; 1937–1940	Succeeded by James Chuter Ede
