= Eleanor Rathbone =

British independent Member of Parliament (1872–1946)

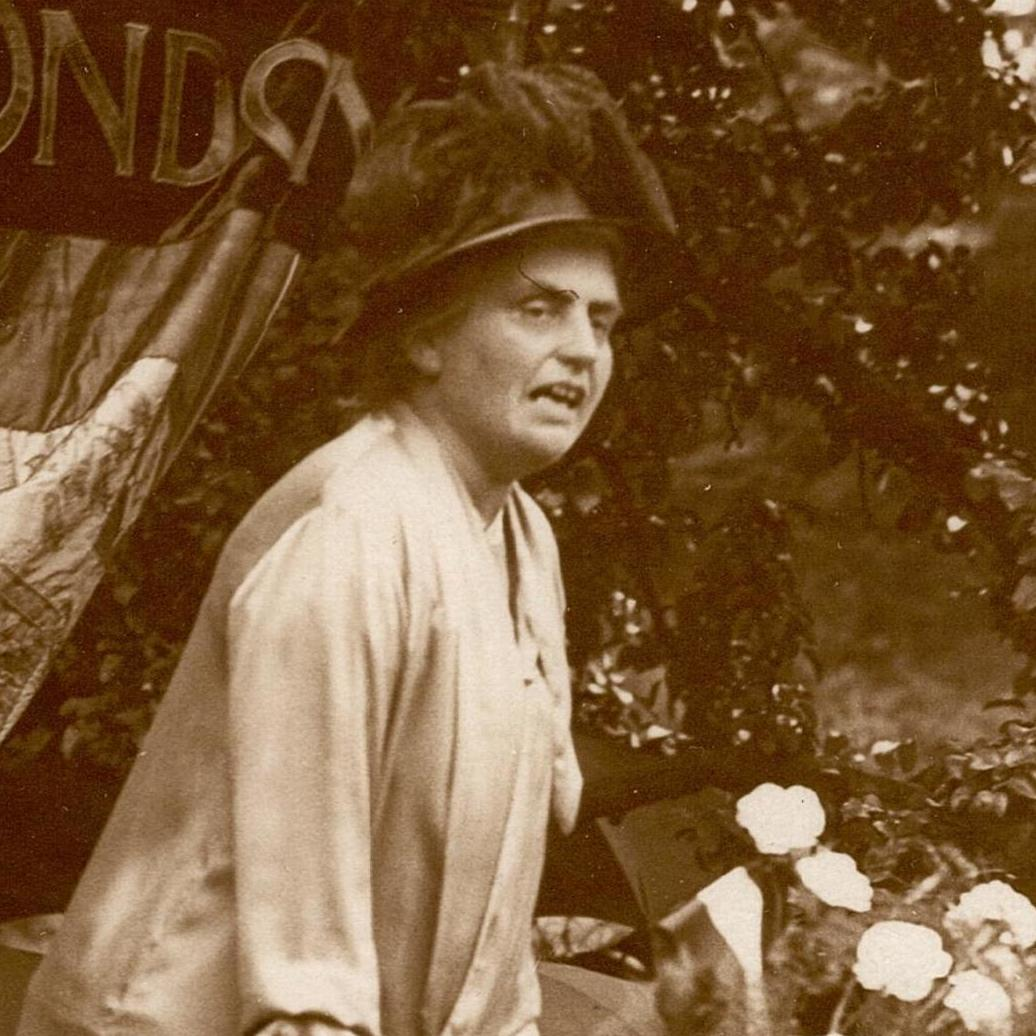

Member of Parliament for Combined English Universities with: Martin Conway 1929–1931; Reginald Henry Craddock 1931–1937; Thomas Edmund Harvey 1937–1945; Kenneth Martin Lindsay 1945–1946
- In office 30 May 1929 – 2 January 1946
- Prime Minister: Stanley Baldwin
- Preceded by: Alfred Hopkinson and Martin Conway
- Succeeded by: Henry Strauss and Kenneth Martin Lindsay

Personal details
- Born: Eleanor Florence Rathbone; 12 May 1872 London, England
- Died: 2 January 1946 (aged 73) London, England
- Party: Independent
- Parent(s): William Rathbone VI; Emily Lyle

Eleanor Florence Rathbone (12 May 1872 – 2 January 1946) was an independent British Member of Parliament (MP) and long-term campaigner for family allowance and for women's rights. She was a member of the noted Rathbone family of Liverpool.

== Early life and education ==
Rathbone was the daughter of the social reformer William Rathbone VI and his second wife, Emily Acheson Lyle. She spent her early years in Liverpool. Her family encouraged her to concentrate on social issues; the family motto was "What ought to be done, can be done."

Rathbone was educated mainly at home, tutored in Latin and Greek by feminist Janet Case, later attending Kensington High School (now Kensington Prep School), London. She went on to attend Somerville College, Oxford, against the protests of her mother, and received Classics coaching from Lucy Mary Silcox. She studied with tutors outside of Somerville, which at that time did not yet have a Classics tutor, taking Roman History with Henry Francis Pelham, Moral Philosophy with Edward Caird, and Greek History with Reginald Macan. Some of these classes were taken together with Barbara Bradby, a lifelong friend.

Rathbone was devoted to her studies, taking little part in the entertainments available to female students such as games, and engaging in limited socialising with male students. Her handwriting was reportedly so poor that she had to dictate her final exam papers to a typist, and she received a result in the Second class.

In 1894 she was one of the seven founding members of the "Associated Prigs". This was the unofficial name of a women's discussion group that met on Sundays evenings. The first meeting was in Edith Marvin's room. They never agreed a name or leader but the group would keep notes and the links established were valuable after they left Somerville. Another founder member was Mildred Pope and other early members were Margery Fry and Hilda Oakeley.

Denied an Oxford degree due to her gender, she was one of the steamboat ladies who travelled to Ireland between 1904 and 1907 to receive an ad eundem University of Dublin degree (at Trinity College Dublin).

After Oxford, Rathbone worked alongside her father to investigate social and industrial conditions in Liverpool, until he died in 1902. They also opposed the Second Boer War. In 1903 Rathbone published their Report on the results of a Special Inquiry into the conditions of Labour at the Liverpool Docks, a report that revealed the impact of erratic docker's wages on the living standards of their wives and children. In 1905 she assisted in establishing the School of Social Science at the University of Liverpool, where she lectured in public administration. Her connection with the university is still recognised by the Eleanor Rathbone building, lecture theatre and Chair of Sociology.

== Suffrage campaigner ==
Rathbone joined the Liverpool Women's Suffrage Society shortly after university and soon became a member of the executive committee of the National Union of Women's Suffrage Societies. She wrote a series of articles for suffragist magazine The Common Cause. Rathbone and other Liverpool suffrage campaigners, such as Alice Morrissey, ensured women's political and franchise groups acted co-operatively in Liverpool despite the sometimes violent sectarianism and political divisions of the community at that time. In 1913 with Nessie Stewart-Brown she co-founded the Liverpool Women Citizen's Association to promote women's involvement in political affairs and educate women in citizenship to prepare them for enfranchisement. This initiative was widely copied across the country.

When the Representation of the People Act afforded women over the age of 30 the right to vote in 1918, Rathbone was instrumental in ensuring this included a local government vote as well as parliamentary.

The following year she succeeded Millicent Garrett Fawcett as President of the National Union of Societies for Equal Citizenship (the renamed National Union of Women's Suffrage Societies) and led successful campaigns for universal women's suffrage, equal guardianship of children, divorce law reform and widow's pensions.

== Local politician and campaigner ==
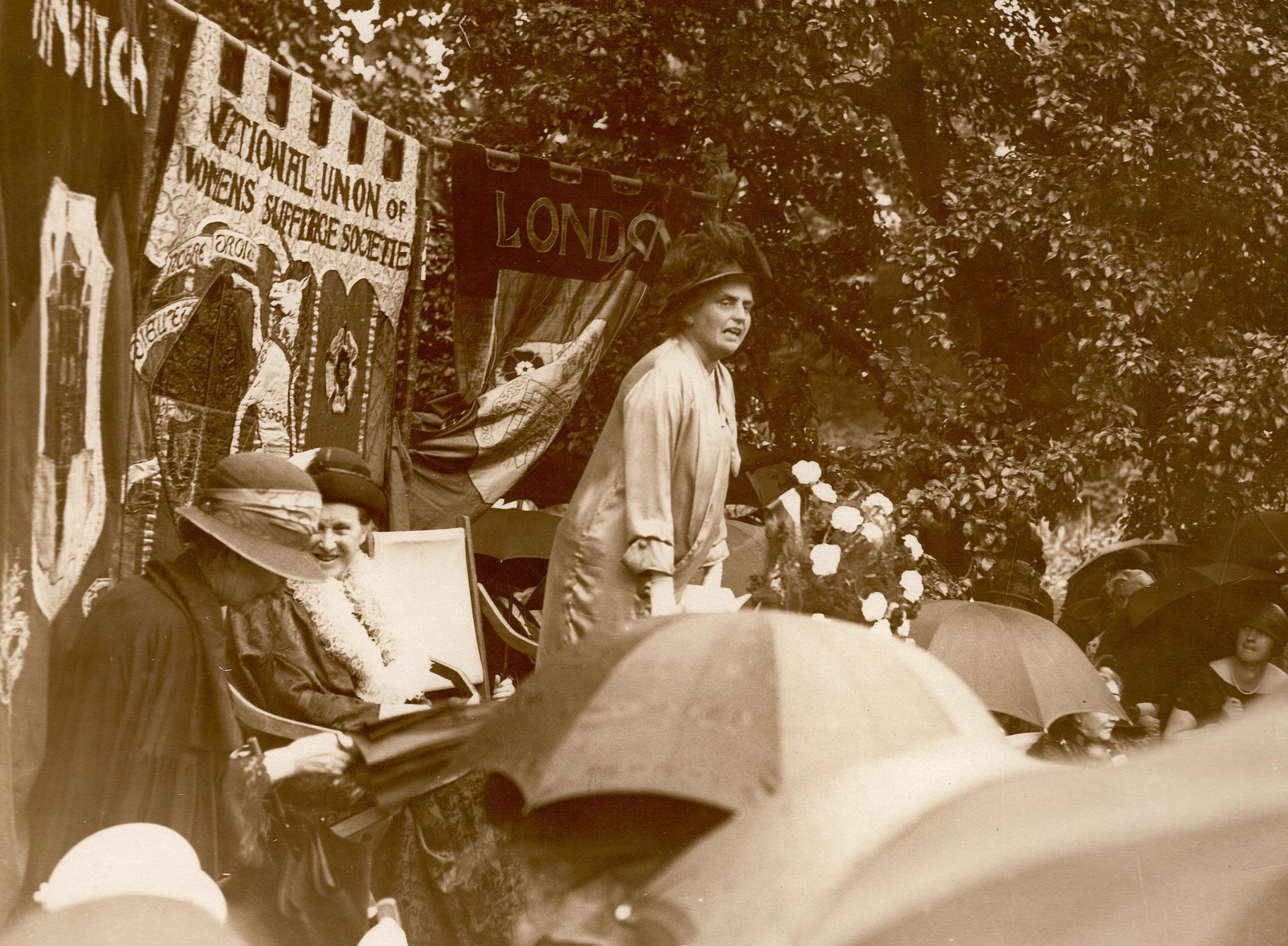
Campaigning

Rathbone was elected as an independent member of Liverpool City Council in 1910 for the seat of Granby Ward, a position she retained until 1935.

Rathbone campaigned for a number of social and political issues at the local level and was involved in establishing various groups and charitable organisations. At the outbreak of the First World War, Rathbone organised the Town Hall Soldiers' and Sailors' Families Association (today known as SSAFA, the Armed Forces charity) to support wives and dependants of soldiers. She also formed the Liverpool 1918 Club alongside Elizabeth Macadam, a luncheon club for women aiming to maintain friendships and professional contacts forged during the First World War and women's suffrage campaign. The club still meets at the Adelphi Hotel and is reputedly the oldest women's forum still meeting. In 1919, Rathbone co-founded the Liverpool Personal Service Society with social worker Dorothy Keeling. Also involved in its formation were Elizabeth Macadam and academic Frederic D'Aeth. The Personal Service Society was a social care organisation, which aimed to be "a society for any citizen in difficulty".

From 1918 onwards, Rathbone campaigned for a system of family allowances paid directly to mothers. She also opposed violent repression of rebellion in Ireland (see Irish Home Rule movement).

Rathbone campaigned for women's rights in India, although in a misguided manner. A believer that the Raj authorities were not getting to grips with Indian social issues, she used figures from the 1931 census to support her misguided claim that child marriages were not in decline and that the act had caused a significant spike in the numbers. She claimed that there had been a 50 percent increase in wives under the age of 15 and a quadrupling of wives under 5 years old since 1921, and that the lives of women were being blighted. She thought Indians incapable of helping themselves and in need of firmer instruction from British authorities, who should enforce change, rather than merely encourage it. In turn, debates such as those, based on untrustworthy information, informed opinions about Indian nationalism and the role of Britain generally in the country. Rathbone herself was confronted by Rama Rau, an Indian feminist, who said that the British were simply not well-placed to understand Indian culture and that "educated Indian women were working in every province of their country to eradicate social evils and outmoded customs and prejudices, and we refused to accept the assertion that the removal of social evils in Indian society was the responsibility of the British".

She contested the 1922 General Election as an Independent candidate at Liverpool East Toxteth against the sitting Unionist MP and was defeated.

In 1924 in the Disinherited Family, she argued that economic dependence of women was based on the practice of supporting variably-sized families with wages that were paid to men, regardless of whether the men had families or not. Later she exposed insurance regulations that reduced married women's access to unemployment benefits and health insurance.

== Westminster politician ==
Rathbone campaigned for Parliament as a feminist, stating "I am standing as a woman, not because I believe there is any antagonism between men's and women's interests but because I believe there is need in the House of Commons for more women who can represent directly the special experience and point of view of women."

In 1929 Rathbone entered parliament as an independent MP for the Combined English Universities. One of her first speeches was about what is now known as female genital mutilation in Kenya, then a British colony. During the Depression, she campaigned for cheap milk and better benefits for the children of the unemployed. In 1931 she helped to organise the defeat of a proposal to abolish the university seats in the parliament and won re-election in 1935.

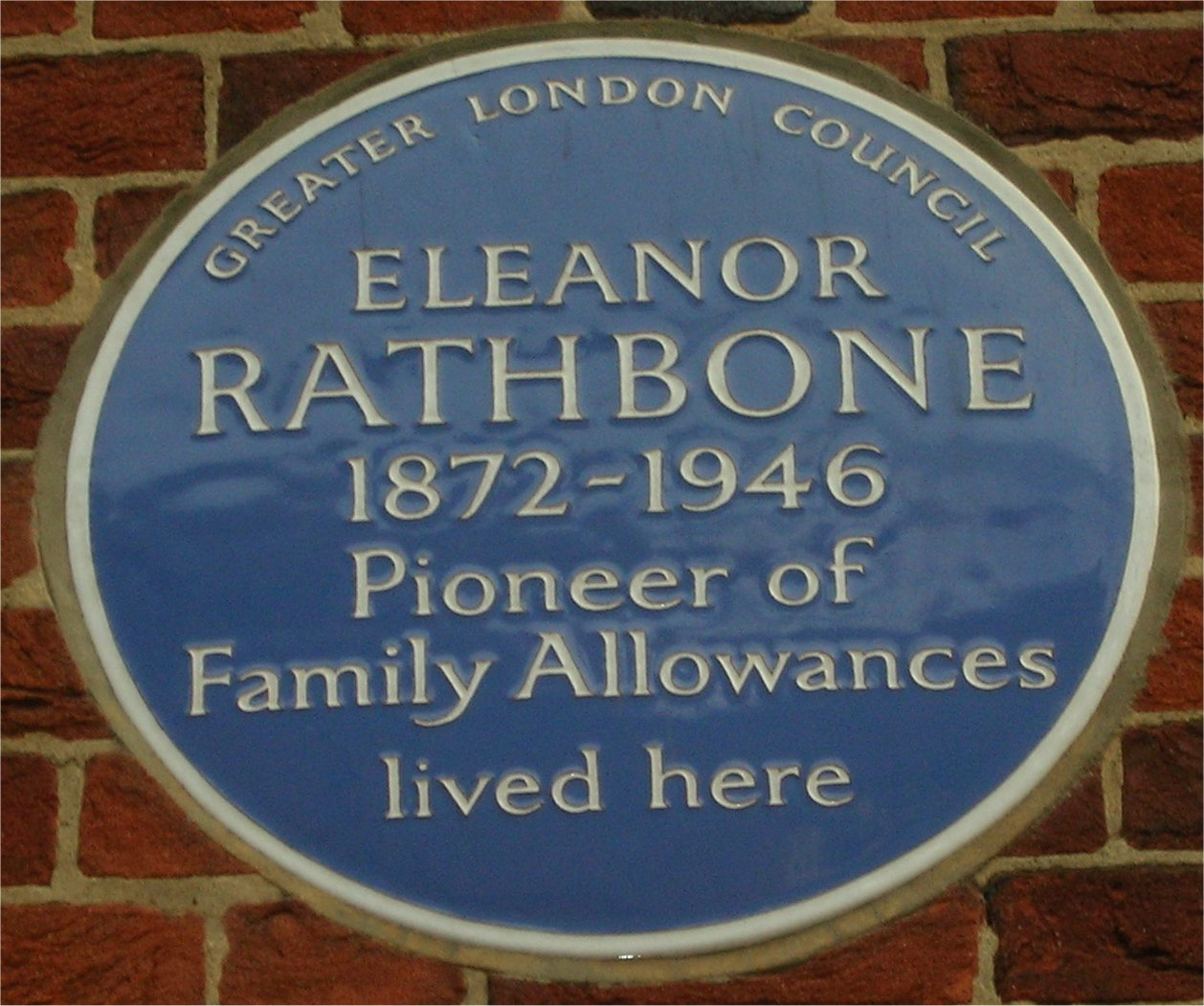
Blue plaque on her house in Tufton Street, Westminster

Rathbone realised the nature of Nazi Germany and in the 1930s joined the British Non-Sectarian Anti-Nazi Council to support human rights.

In 1934, she become the leader of the Children's Minimum Committee which was constituted after the BMA Nutrition Report to sensitise the public opinion about the "wide discrepancy" existing between "the cost of a satisfactory diet and the actual sums available to poorly paid or unemployed parents for the nourishment of their children."

When in 1931 Japan invaded Manchuria, Eleanor Rathbone thought Britain was too complacent and did not explain how Japan could have been deterred, without, like the Soviet invasion of Hungary in 1956, risking a World War.

In 1936 she began to warn about a Nazi threat to Czechoslovakia. She also favoured rearmament and argued for its necessity in the Manchester Guardian.

She became an outspoken critic of appeasement in Parliament. She denounced British complacency in Hitler's remilitarisation of the Rhineland, and the Italian conquest of Abyssinia. She supported the League of Nations' attempt to impose sanctions on Italy, although she expressed sympathy for France's opposition to the sanctions including oil, as France had no oil. She criticised when Britain, having imposed sanctions on Italy, subsequently lifted them, and was appalled when in January 1939, on a visit to Italy by Neville Chamberlain and Lord Halifax at a state banquet in Rome, Mr Chamberlain set the seal of social cordiality on the Abyssinian betrayal by raising his glass to "His Majesty the King of Italy, Emperor of Ethiopia".

In respect of the Spanish Civil War. Once she tried to hire a ship to run the blockade of Spain and remove Republicans at risk from reprisals. Her determination was such that junior ministers and civil servants of the Foreign Office would reputedly duck behind pillars when they saw her coming. She supported the points of Winston Churchill and Clement Attlee but earned the enmity of Neville Chamberlain. She observed:

I am no admirer of any dictatorship, certainly not that of Stalin, but it is only fair to recognise in the sordid history of the Non-Intervention Agreement the one bright spot was the part played by the USSR.

In 1936, Rathbone was one of several people who supported the British Provisional Committee for the Defence of Leon Trotsky, and signed a letter to the Manchester Guardian defending Trotsky's right to asylum and calling for an international inquiry into the Moscow Trials. While she advocated for gender difference, during a speech to Parliament she said that "those who expect women’s contributions to be something completely sui generis, utterly different from the contribution of men, will be disappointed."

On 30 September 1938, Rathbone denounced the just-publicised Munich Agreement. She pressured the parliament to aid the Czechoslovaks and grant entry for dissident Germans, Austrians and Jews. In late 1938 she set up the Parliamentary Committee on Refugees to take up individual cases from Spain, Czechoslovakia and Germany. During World War II she regularly chastised Osbert Peake, undersecretary at the Home Office, and in 1942 pressured the government to publicise the evidence of the Holocaust.

Eleanor Rathbone often supported unpopular causes such as German and Italian internees. At the height of the battle of Britain on 10 July 1940, she complained of the harsh treatment of internees, many of which were Germans who had fled from Germany because they were anti-Hitler. In a speech to the House of Commons on 15 October 1945, she was one of few Britons prepared to criticise the expulsion of 2,500,000 people of German origin from Czechoslovakia during the winter months of 1946 because it might create large-scale starvation. Many Germans had been anti-Nazi. Later, Eleanor Rathbone achieved limited success when the minister agreed not to allow the deportation of pregnant women or young children during the winter months.

== Personal life ==
At the end of the First World War, Rathbone and the social work campaigner Elizabeth Macadam bought a house in London together. The two friends continued to share the house until Rathbone's sudden death in January 1946.

Rathbone's studies in Classics and Philosophy, as well as her experience of social work led her to reject religion and adopt a rationalist perspective. She believed that concern for others was the foundation of ethics.

Rathbone was a first cousin once-removed of the actor Basil Rathbone. Her nephew John Rankin Rathbone was the Conservative MP for Bodmin from 1935 until his death in the Battle of Britain, 1940, when his wife Beatrice succeeded him as MP. Her great-nephew Tim Rathbone was Conservative MP for Lewes from 1974 to 1997.

Her great-niece, Jenny Rathbone, was a Labour councillor in Islington and later was the Parliamentary Candidate for the Labour Party in the South Wales constituency of Cardiff Central at the 2010 General Election. She was elected to the National Assembly for Wales as representative for Cardiff Central in the 2011 National Assembly elections.

Brian Harrison's suffrage interviews project, titled Oral evidence on the suffragette and suffragist movements: the Brian Harrison interviews, holds a number of interviews with employees of Rathbone's.

In February 1977 Harrison interviewed Marjorie Soper, who worked for Rathbone at the Family Endowment Society where she was involved in research and propaganda for family allowances which Rathbone considered an integral part of the 'new feminism'. Soper also ghost wrote articles for Rathbone.

In March 1977 Doris Cox was interviewed twice, firstly with Marjorie Soper and secondly with Vera Schaerli (the journalist, also known as Vera Craig). Cox and Soper describe Rathbone's personality, her secretarial arrangements and her home, her Parliamentary speeches and relationships with politicians. Cox and Schaerli talk about Rathbone's working and domestic arrangements with Elizabeth Macadam, and of the demands Rathbone placed on her employees and her style of working.

An August 1977 interview took place with Helga Wolff, who became an employee of Rathbone after being introduced by Erna Nelki. Wolff was a secretary for Rathbone's refugee work and speaks about the Parliamentary Committee on Refugees as well as Rathbone's secretarial arrangements in the early 1940s.

In September 1984 he interviewed Vera Schaerli again, who describes Rathbone's personality and personal relationships as well as her influence on Members of Parliament

== Legacy ==
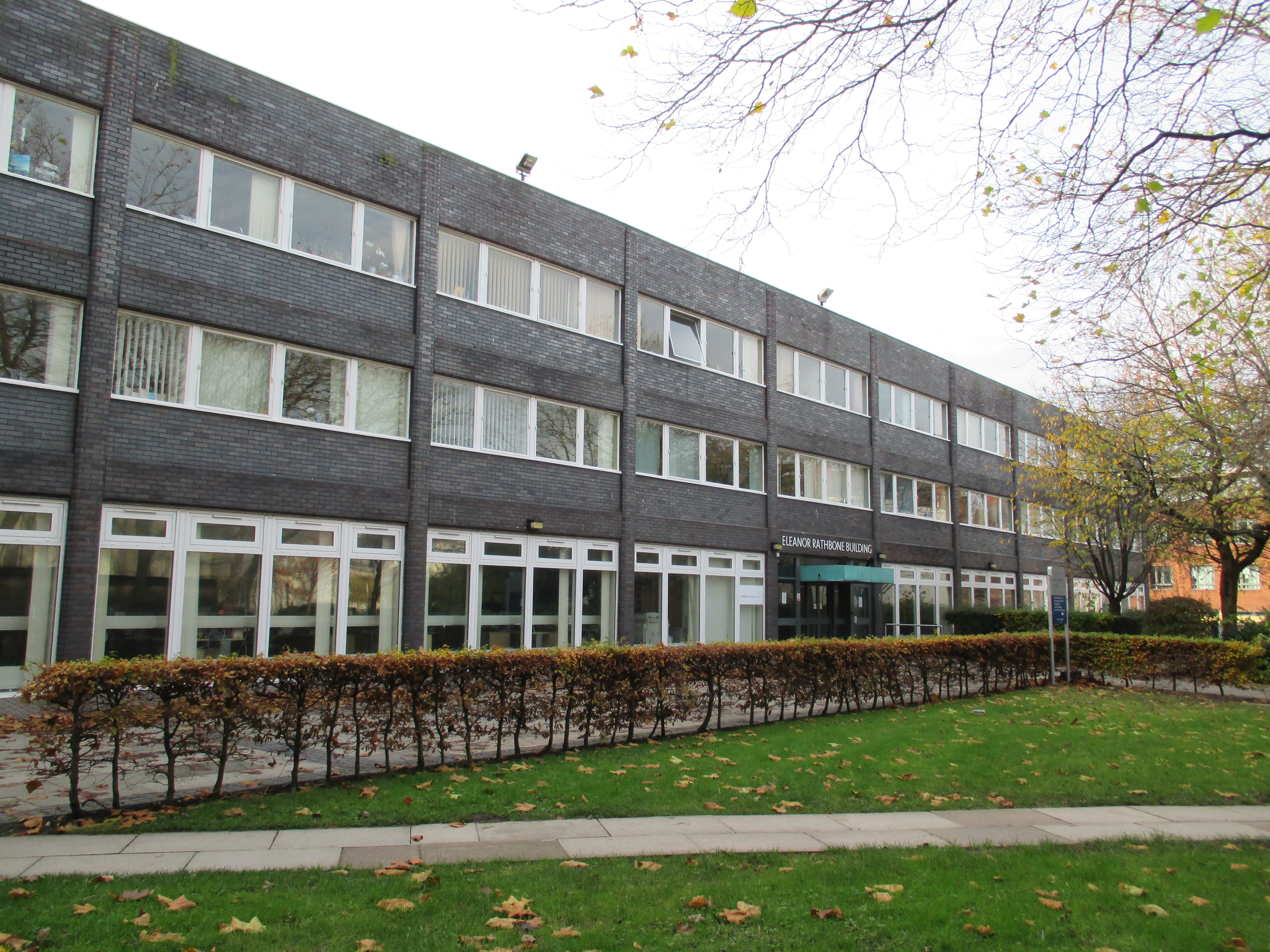
Eleanor Rathbone Building, University of Liverpool

In 1945, the year before her death, Eleanor Rathbone saw the Family Allowances Act pass into law.^{:310}

In 1986, a blue plaque was erected for her by Greater London Council at Tufton Court, Tufton Street, Westminster, London SW1P 3QH, City of Westminster, where she had lived.

In 1996, the Labour MP Frank Field led calls for a statue of Rathrone to be erected. The Liverpool Echo quoted him as saying "she was one of the country's great politicians". The same edition of the newspaper stated that Speaker Betty Boothroyd had agreed to pass on the request for a statue.

Her name and picture (and those of 58 other women's suffrage supporters) are on the plinth of the statue of Millicent Fawcett in Parliament Square, London, unveiled in 2018.

The University of Liverpool acknowledges Rathbone by way of its Eleanor Rathbone Building; the site houses the School of Law and Social Justice and the Department of Psychology, as well as the Eleanor Rathbone Theatre used for stage productions and musical performances. Edge Hill University has a hall of residence called Eleanor Rathbone in honour of her work as a social reformer.

In 2025, the Faculty of History at the University of Oxford inaugurated the Eleanor Rathbone Chair in Contemporary European History. It was named in her honour "to mark her lifelong work and engagement with issues of contemporary European politics and social inequality".

== Further Information ==
The Museum of Liverpool has on permanent display a silver casket presented to Rathbone in 1918. A plaque inside the casket is engraved: "Presented to Eleanor F. Rathbone, M.A.C.C. (Pioneer in Women's Work) with a cheque & scroll by the members of the Liverpool Society for Women's Suffrage N.U.W.S.S & other friends. To commemorate the passing of the Representation of The People Bill, 1918, and in token of their affectionate gratitude for her devoted service to the cause of women's franchise, July 8th, 1918".

== See also ==
- History of feminism
- List of suffragists and suffragettes
- Women's suffrage in the United Kingdom
- Refugees
- Rescue of Jews

Parliament of the United Kingdom
Preceded by Sir Alfred Hopkinson and Sir Martin Conway	Member of Parliament for the Combined English Universities; 1929–1946; With: Sir Martin Conway to 1931; Sir Reginald Henry Craddock 1931–1937; Thomas Edmund Harvey 1937–1945; Kenneth Martin Lindsay 1945—	Succeeded by Henry Strauss and Kenneth Martin Lindsay
