= Rudolph M. Hunter =

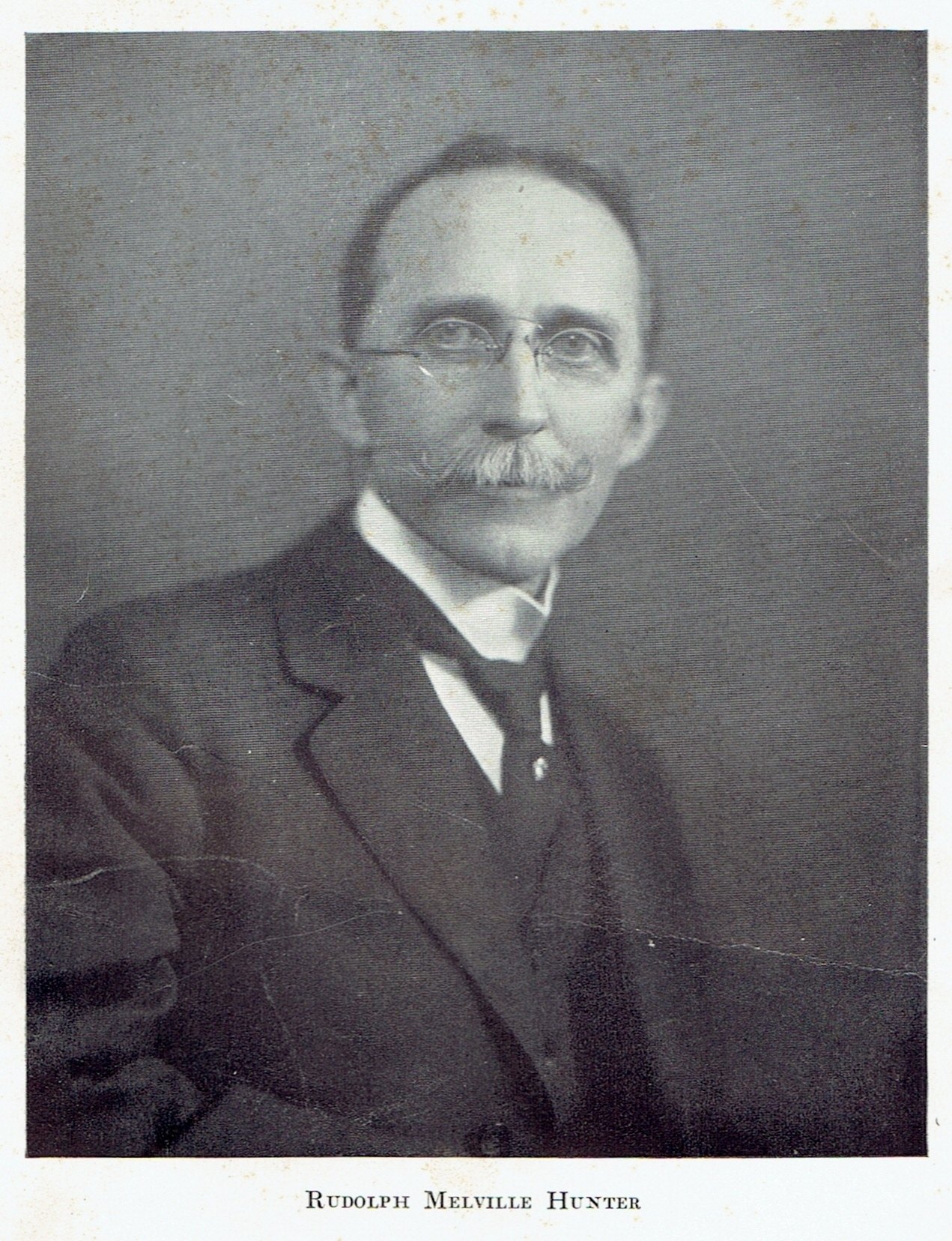
- Born: Rudolph Melville Hunter; June 20, 1856; New York City, U.S.
- Died: March 19, 1935 (aged 78); Philadelphia, Pennsylvania, U.S.
- Spouse: Emilie Phillips (m. 1879)

Signature
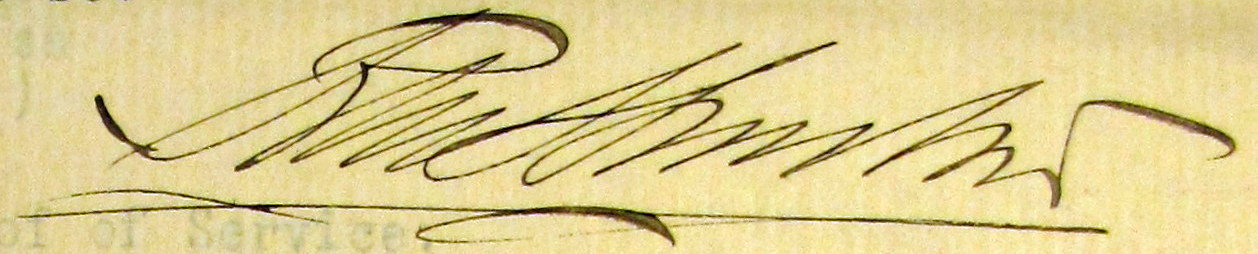

Rudolph Melville Hunter (June 20, 1856 – March 19, 1935) was an American inventor, engineer, patent attorney and entrepreneur. Hunter was granted 299 US patents, over 140 of them for electric railway apparatus. He played a key role in the development of "mixed control," long the standard method of controlling the speed of electric streetcars and locomotives. Hunter later largely abandoned his work as a practical inventor and devoted himself to a futile (despite his claims of success) quest to transmute silver and other metals into gold.

== Early life and education ==
Hunter's father, Robert, was a physician specializing in respiratory disorders. Canadian by birth, he married Sarah Barton, also Canadian, in 1846. Rudolph was born in New York City, the fifth of the couple's eight children who survived infancy.

Robert Hunter, an inventor in his own right, was granted seven US patents for marine propulsion systems (including one for a mechanical toy fish). The last of those patents (No. 150,956), issued in May 1874, was for an innovative design that he had introduced in a canal boat in 1872. Lured by a $100,000 prize, he entered the boat in a New York State-sponsored contest to design a viable steam propulsion system for use on the state's canals. Hunter's design featured two stern-mounted, vertically oriented paddlewheels that rotated in opposite directions, in order to control wake. The pitch of the wheels' blades could be adjusted to steer the boat without the use of a rudder or to move it in reverse without reversing the engine. Unfortunately, the system proved impracticable, and the boat failed to complete its trial runs.

From childhood Rudolph was strongly encouraged to invent, and one of his early inventions appears to have been inspired by his father's canal-boat work. In 1878, at age 22, he sketched a rudderless submarine equipped with two side-mounted screw propellers. The propellers could be pivoted to point backward, forward, up or down, thereby moving the vessel in any direction. He refined the design and in the 1880s tried to sell it to the US Navy and foreign governments. He failed to find a buyer, however, and he did not patent the design.

Hunter attended schools in England, France and Canada before embarking, at age 15, on his career path. In 1871 he started work as a draftsman for Frank Millward, in Cincinnati, Ohio. Millward did engineering and patent work, and Hunter, while in his employ, diligently studied engineering. In 1874 Hunter took his newfound engineering skills to Olive Foundry & Machine Shops, in Ironton, Ohio, where he designed and built machinery. By 1876 he had moved to Chicago, Illinois, in part to seek proper care (most likely from his father, who had moved there from Cincinnati) for respiratory troubles. Later that year he moved to Philadelphia, where he resumed his formal education. He studied mechanical engineering at the Polytechnic College of the State of Pennsylvania, earning a bachelor's degree in 1878. He settled permanently in Philadelphia and in October 1879 married Emilie Phillips, daughter of a Pittsburgh, Pennsylvania, physician.

== Career ==
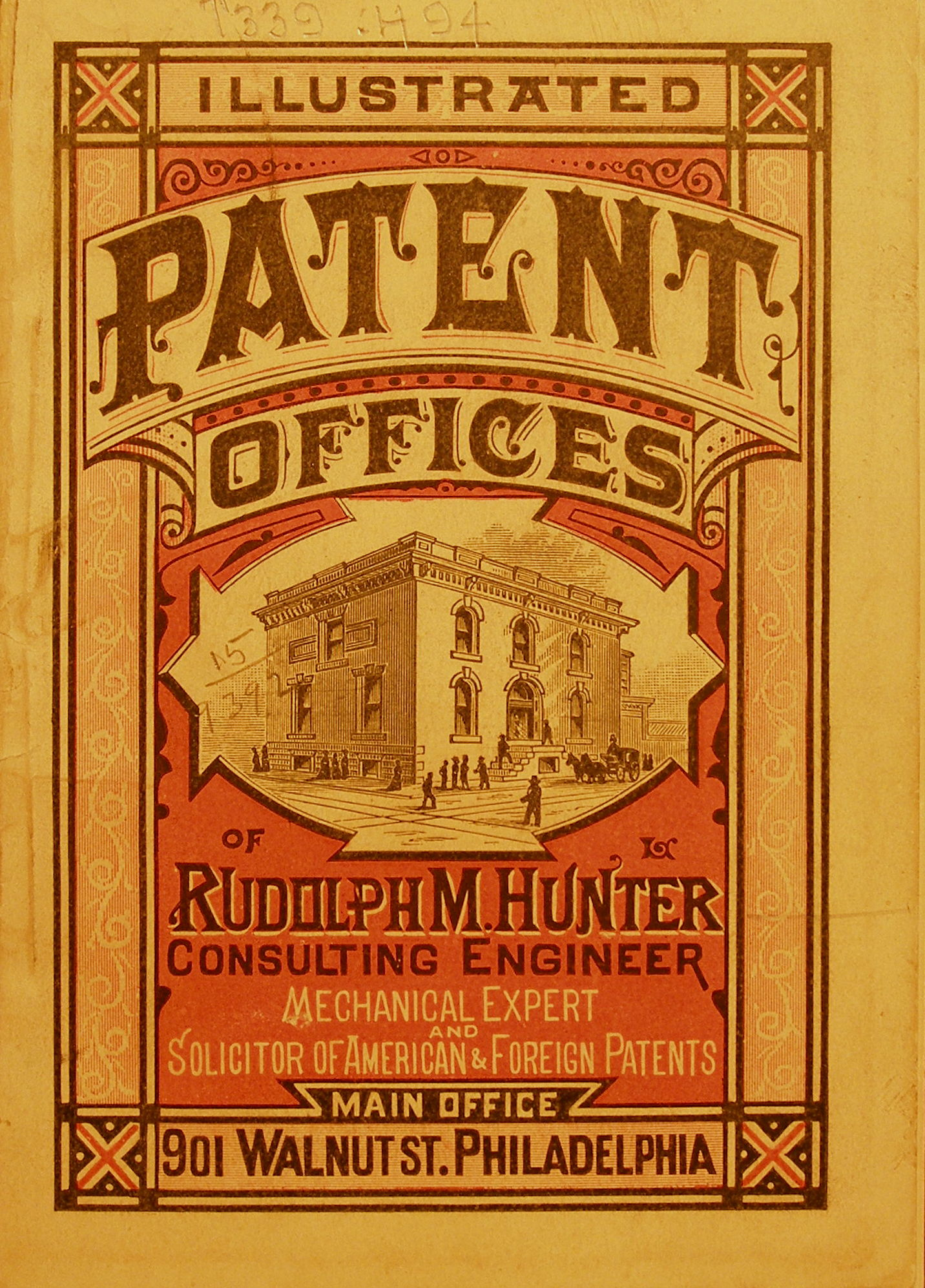
Cover of 1880 book advertising Hunter's services as a consulting engineer and patent attorney.

By late 1878 Hunter had established an office in Philadelphia to offer his services as a consulting engineer and patent attorney. In June 1879 he secured his first patent (No. 216,519), for a "process and apparatus" for making illuminating gas. He eventually held 299 US patents, 279 of them issued by 1902. He also secured seven Canadian and six British patents, all for inventions on which he also held a US patent. His inventions ranged from mechanical toys to industrial machinery, but most were for electrical devices and systems. Throughout his career as an inventor, he continued to work as a patent attorney, representing himself in numerous patent interference cases, in addition to serving outside clients.

=== Electric railways ===
Hunter's primary focus, early in his career, was on the development of electric railways. From 1881 to 1886 he struggled to secure financing to patent and commercialize his many inventions in the field. But with the formation of Electric Car Company of America (originally named Hunter Electric Co.), in 1887, he finally had the resources to build and market electric street-railway systems. Electric Car's prospects quickly dimmed, however, largely due to the success of other inventors and to the efforts of major electrical firms to develop their own street-railway businesses. In 1888 Frank J. Sprague completed the Richmond Union Passenger Railway, widely considered the first successful large-scale electric street-railway system. Sprague had close ties to Thomas Edison's organization, and in April 1889 his company became part of the newly incorporated Edison General Electric Co. Over a year earlier, Thomson-Houston Electric Co. had bought out Sprague's chief rival, Charles Van Depoele, and in August 1889 Thomson-Houston bought partial rights to Electric Car's patents, the bulk of which were Hunter's. Edison General and Thomson-Houston were locked in fierce competition, one aspect of which was costly and time-consuming patent litigation. By early 1892 both companies were eager to end the rivalry, and in April they did so, by merging. One of the merger's key benefits was to consolidate control of the Sprague, Van Depoele, and Electric Car patents (and many other patents) in the resulting corporate giant, General Electric Co.

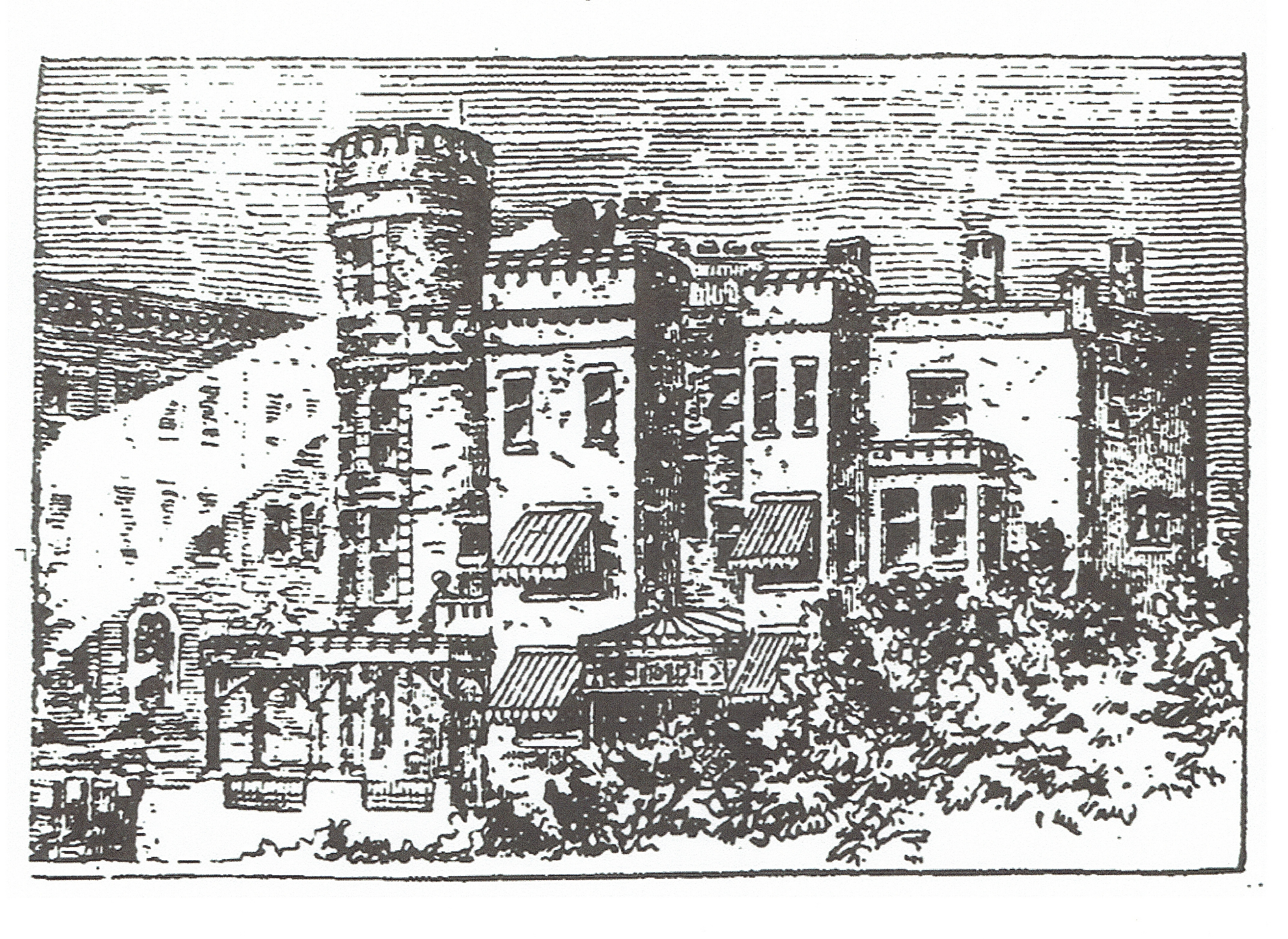
Hunter's "castle" at 3710 Chestnut St., Philadelphia.

The sale of Electric Car's patent rights, though it may have dashed any grand hopes Hunter had for the company, made him a wealthy man. In a December 1894 letter to Franklin Institute secretary William H. Wahl, Hunter intimated that the deal had netted him more than $600,000 (more than $15,000,000 in 2018 dollars). That figure is unverified and may be exaggerated, but there is little doubt that Thomson-Houston considered his patents valuable. In an 1891 publication, the company listed the 82 "most important" electric railway patents under its control. A surprising 27 of them, more than for any other inventor, were Hunter's. And it is clear that his financial situation and lifestyle improved dramatically at about the time of the sale. In December 1889, after years of living in rented quarters, he moved into a castle-like mansion he built in West Philadelphia. By 1893 he had crowned the structure with a rooftop street-railway line, which he used, he told The Philadelphia Press, to test and apply new designs.

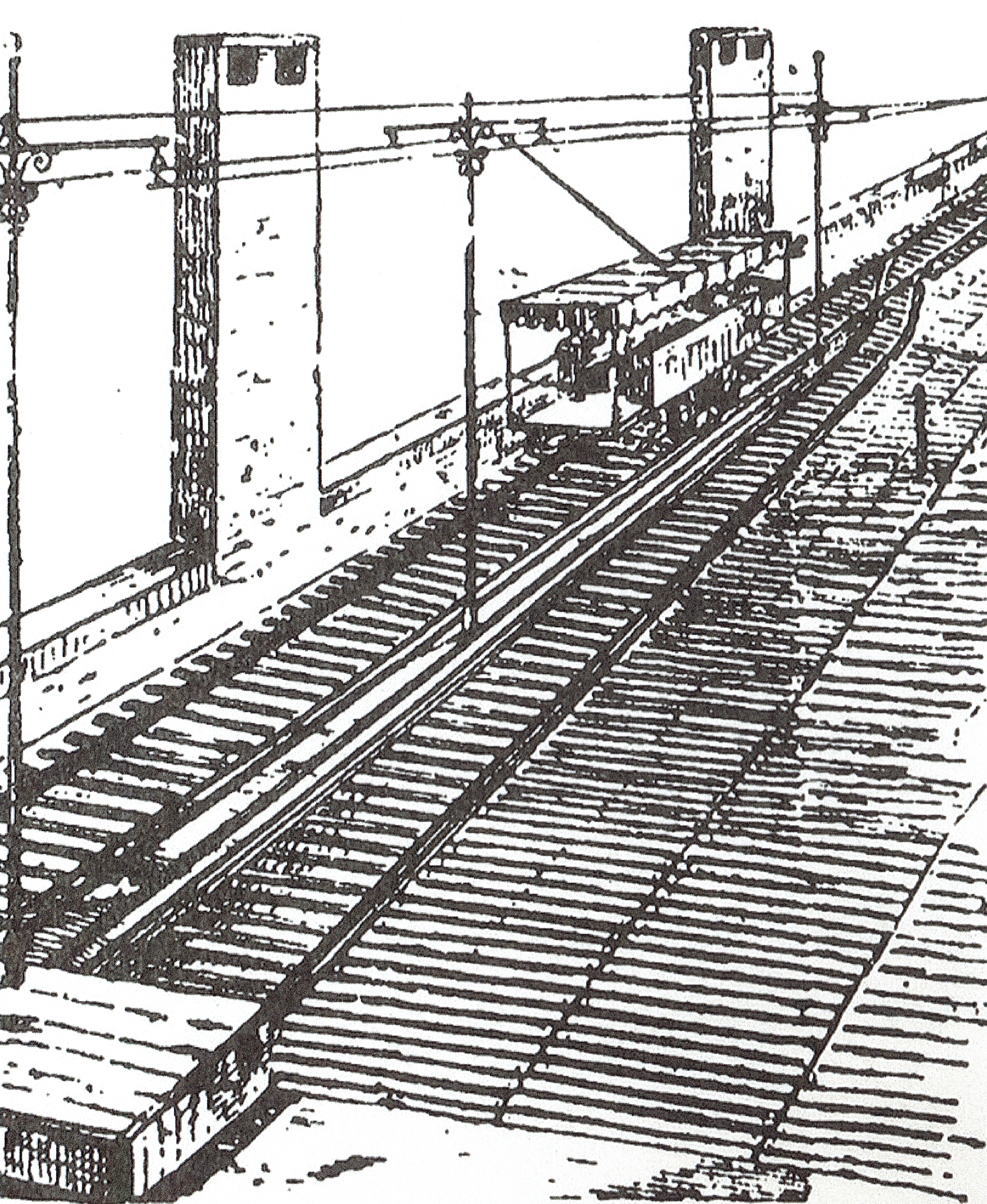
Working trolley line on the roof of Hunter's Chestnut St. home.

In 1894, hoping to gain recognition for his electric railway work, Hunter entered an annual competition conducted by the Franklin Institute's Committee on Science and the Arts. In a June 26 letter to Wahl, he audaciously claimed to have invented the "modern electric railway" virtually in its entirety. On his official entry forms, submitted a few days earlier, he was more realistic, claiming credit mainly for two of the electric street-railway's key elements: the "trolley system" (specifically, a viable underrunning trolley assembly) and the "series-multiple controller" (a speed- and torque-control switch, better known as the "series-parallel controller").

A report on Hunter's entry concluded that other inventors had received at least partial credit for the underrunning trolley and that it was up to "the courts," not the Committee on Science and the Arts, to determine priority of invention. The committee declined, therefore, to give him an award. Hunter was outraged, though the committee's decision clearly was justified. Nearly two years earlier, the US Patent Office had granted priority of invention to Van Depoele, who had prevailed against both Sprague and Hunter in a landmark interference case. Van Depoele's patent (No. 495,443), issued posthumously and assigned to Thomson-Houston, was extremely valuable and, not surprisingly, hotly contested in the courts. In a string of infringement suits brought by Thomson-Houston on GE's behalf, the courts repeatedly affirmed the patent's validity, thereby giving GE a virtual monopoly on the practical underrunning trolley.

The series-parallel controller had also been the subject of an interference battle. Hunter held a US patent (No. 385,055), issued in June 1888, for the device, but a British patent (Great Britain No. 2989 of 1881) had been granted to electrical engineer John Hopkinson over six years earlier. Hopkinson applied for a US patent in 1892, triggering an interference case. Hunter presented evidence that he had conceived his controller before Hopkinson's formal (for purposes of the case) date of invention, but Hopkinson nonetheless was granted priority of invention. Hunter, the examiner of interferences explained, had failed to show sufficient diligence in reducing his device to practice, prior to Hopkinson's date of invention. Hopkinson's British patent expired, however, before the case was resolved. That made him ineligible for a US patent (which, if issued, would have expired concurrently with his British patent), and Hunter's patent therefore remained in force.

Hunter's contribution to electric-railway motor control did not consist entirely of the series-parallel controller, however. Before the adoption of series-parallel control, rheostats were widely used to control the speed of cars. In November 1888 Electric Car's general manager, George H. Condict, secured a US patent (No. 393,323) for a switch that improved on Hunter's series-parallel design. His most important advance (though neither he nor Hunter, who acted as his patent attorney, realized it at the time) was to integrate the series-parallel and rheostatic methods in a single control mechanism. Condict's patent was among the many that Electric Car licensed to Thomson-Houston, and in 1892 (just after the Thomson-Houston—Edison General Electric merger was consummated) GE introduced a controller based largely on his design. The new device was extremely successful and, as a result, closely imitated by other companies. Thomson-Houston (on behalf of GE) and Electric Car countered with at least four suits for infringement of Condict's patent. The courts fully upheld the patent at first, but a US circuit court, in a 1901 ruling, partially invalidated it. The court found that "mixed control" (the joint use of series-parallel and rheostatic control) had been anticipated in two Hunter patents (Nos. 431,720 and 385,180). Those patents describe the use of both control methods, but not by way of a single control mechanism. The court therefore recognized the contributions of both Hunter and Condict to mixed control: Hunter for the broad method; Condict for the method’s practical implementation, using a single switch.

=== Electric power transmission ===
Hunter again entered the Franklin Institute competition, In 1896, claiming nothing less than to have invented the " 'step up and step down' transformer system of electrical distribution." He based that claim largely on patent No. 460,071, issued to him in 1891, and on drawings indicating that he had conceived such a system by 1881 and reduced a system to practice by 1884.

The Committee on Science and the Arts, in its report on Hunter's entry, noted that, as early as 1838, Joseph Henry had used transformers to step a current up to higher voltage and back down to lower voltage. Hunter had not, therefore, been first to conceive the broad method. Nor, the report added, had he been first to demonstrate the method's practical utility. Marcel Deprez and Jules Carpentier, in a French patent application dated March 1881, had described the use of a step-up and step-down system to remotely activate a platinum filament. Hunter's claimed conception date was August 1881, several months after Deprez and Carpentier had filed their application. The committee again, therefore, denied him an award.

=== Electric automobiles ===
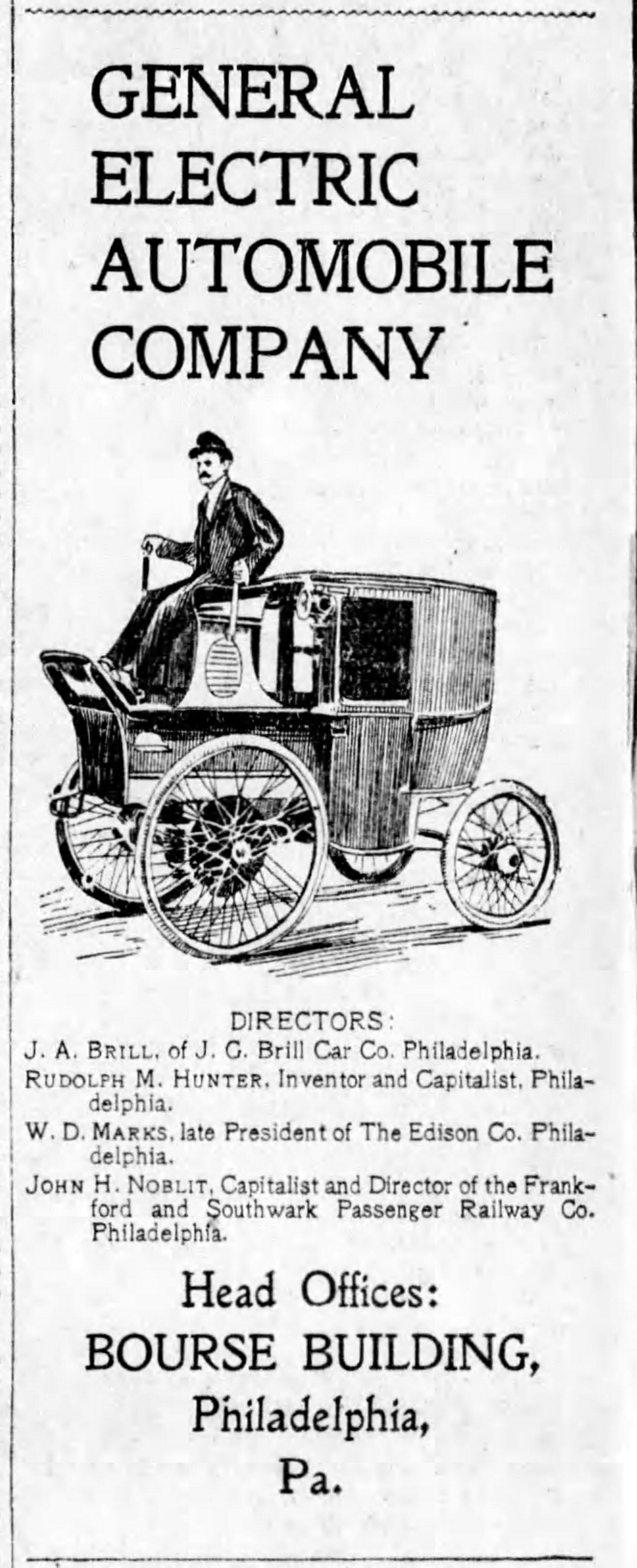
One of the new company's first ads, as it appeared in The Philadelphia Times, June 9, 1898.

In 1898 prospects for the electric automobile seemed bright, and Hunter, armed with his electric-railway expertise, joined forces with prominent Philadelphia businessmen to launch General Electric Automobile Co. The new company (which was not affiliated with GE) touted its control of 69 patents, over half of them Hunter's, that it claimed to cover virtually every element of value in battery-powered vehicles. But they were more properly electric railway patents, the rights to which Electric Car had transferred to GE Auto. Their value, for purposes of making automobiles, was therefore at least somewhat open to question.

GE Auto produced passenger and commercial vehicles but apparently had little success selling them. In an April 1900 ad in The New York Times, John Wanamaker & Co. offered two passenger models for sale. But the automaker was by then in deep financial trouble. A committee had been appointed, in late March, to seek consolidation partners or secure "adequate working capital," and by mid May the company's stock price had collapsed. The committee's efforts, and those of a second reorganization committee, failed, and in July rights to the 69 patents were sold at auction. The $29,000 sale price reportedly covered "less than half" of GE Auto's debt. There is evidence of at least one more reorganization attempt, but the company does not appear to have conducted any significant business after the sale of its patent rights.

=== Motor Trucks ===
In 1901, on the heels of GE Auto's demise, Hunter briefly turned his attention to non-electric vehicles. By the following year he had secured two patents (Nos. 670,405 and 696,143) for motor-trucks powered by gasoline engines (or other means). Both patents were assigned to Tractor Truck & General Power Co., yet another of his enterprises.

The second patent, issued in March 1902, is for a self-contained (i.e., independently operable) truck designed to tow a semi-trailer. Hunter was probably not first to conceive such a vehicle; by 1899 Cleveland, Ohio-based Winton Motor Carriage Co. had converted an automobile into a tractor designed to tow a semi-trailer. But the Winton design was not patented, and Hunter's patent appears to be the first, in the US or elsewhere, for a vehicle that embodies all the basic features of the modern semi-tractor. His key innovation was to position the driver's seat on the tractor, not the trailer (as in previous patents). In so doing, he transformed the tractor from a source of motive power and directional control (essentially, a replacement for the horse) into an independent vehicle.

=== Transmutation ===
In 1903 Hunter largely turned his back on practical invention and turned to a much more speculative pursuit, the transmutation of elements. In a flurry of newspaper articles, the first appearing in July, he announced that he had discovered a process for changing silver (and other metals) into gold. He also announced plans for a $500,000 plant capable of producing "thousands of dollars worth of gold … daily," and he established two firms, Mirabile Corp. and United States Assay and Bullion Co., to implement the venture.

Hunter's claim to have mastered transmutation, though far-fetched, was at least tenuously grounded in advanced (for the day) atomic theory. He had embraced the theory that atoms, instead of being fundamental units of matter (and therefore immutable), consist of yet smaller particles that, depending on their number (and other factors) comprise the different elements. That led him to more or less accurately describe transmutation as a process in which the atom is "divided into its component ions [subatomic particles], and the ions reassembled in new combination." He apparently failed to appreciate, however, how little he (or anyone in 1903) actually knew about the atom and subatomic phenomena. To create gold, he asserted, one needed only to deactivate the particles in silver atoms (by "de-electrifying" them), then "gather up 137,620 of them and impress upon them the proper electric charge … and set them into motion with new orbital range." But that formulation, realistic as it may have seemed to Hunter, was highly speculative and based on faulty assumptions. He had, for example, badly miscalculated the numbers of particles in atoms of silver and gold, and he had assumed all subatomic particles to be the same, except for their electric charge, which he thought could be changed at will.

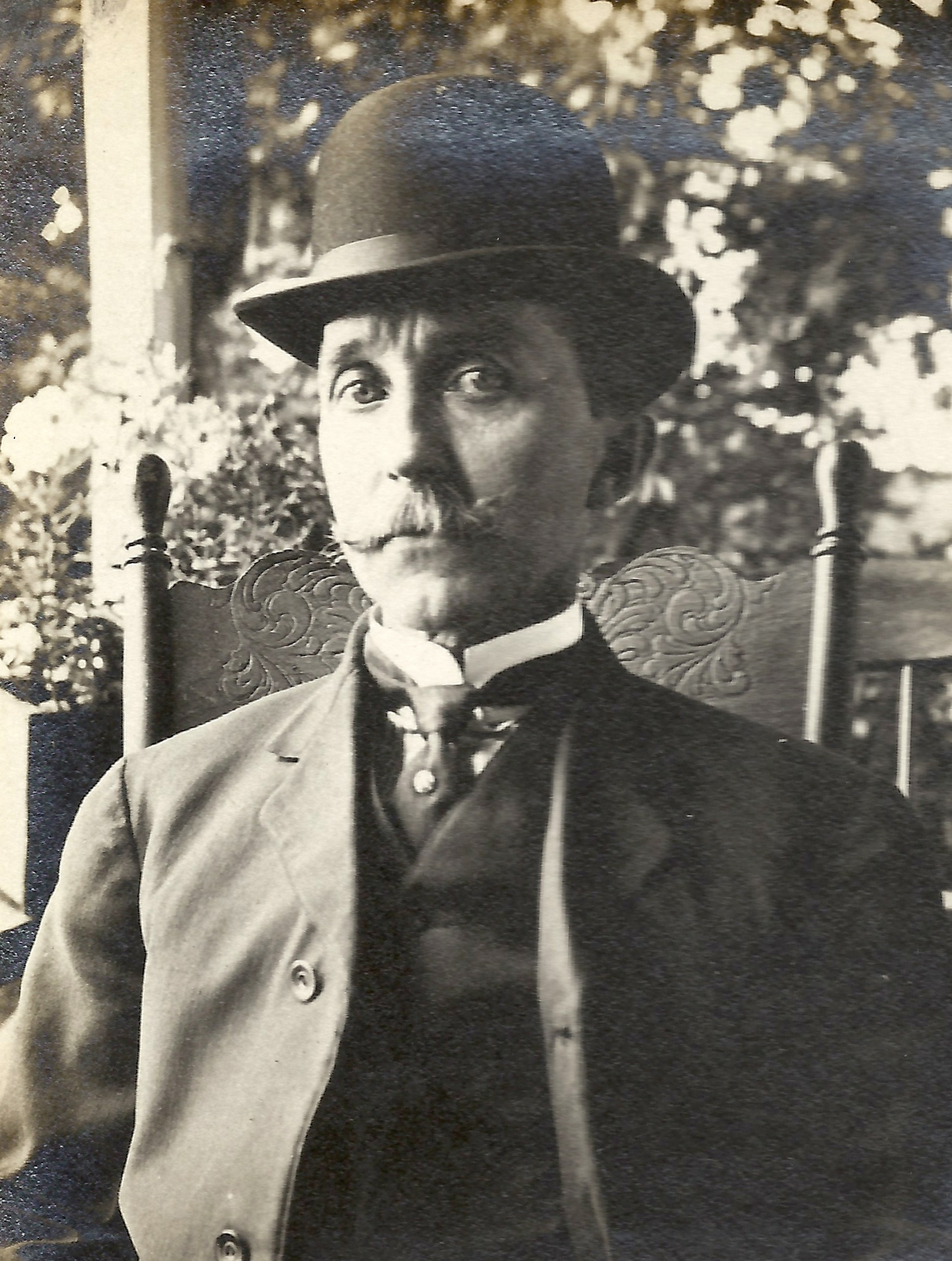
Hunter on vacation in the Thousand Islands, c. 1906.

Just as Hunter was unveiling his transmutation claims, chemists William Ramsay and Frederick Soddy reported one of the most important findings of early atomic science. Their study of radium radioactivity had revealed that radium, as it decays, transmutes into helium. Hunter, in response to that news, wrote Ramsay to tell him that he had already achieved the transmutation of silver into gold. Ramsay, intrigued, wrote Hunter "several times" and in September 1904 visited him in Philadelphia. In letters to his wife and, later, a good friend, Ramsay reported that Hunter was "no swindler" and had "based his conclusions on actual experiments." But his enthusiasm no doubt waned as he observed, for years, samples of processed silver that Hunter had sent him. Hunter claimed that gold was "growing" in the silver, but Ramsay (and others he recruited) found no evidence to support that claim.

Hunter continued to insist, however, that his process worked. In 1916 he went so far as to claim that he could make gold from "common mineral substances, even from water and stone." But the gold-manufacturing plant never materialized, and Mirabile reportedly slipped, more than once, into controversy. There are reports of two 1905 lawsuits (one filed against the company and one on its behalf), both of which state that the transmutation process was invented not by Hunter, but by one of his associates at the company (a different associate was named in each suit). It does not appear, however, that either suit resulted in a judgement or settlement. Some 11 years later, in May 1916, the Galveston Tribune reported that Hunter had earlier been obliged to purchase more than $33,000 in Mirabile stock from disenchanted investors, and that his elder son, Rudolph Harding Hunter, was currently trying to seize control of the company. There is no hard evidence, however, that Mirabile (or US Assay and Bullion) intentionally misled or defrauded investors. So it is at least possible that the gold-making venture, no matter how misguided, was legitimate. It is hard to imagine, on the other hand, how someone with Hunter's expertise and experience could have failed to realize that his process did not work, so the possibility of fraud cannot be dismissed.

== Later years ==
Even as he clung to his transmutation dreams, Hunter never fully abandoned his work as a practical engineer and inventor. He secured 20 US patents after 1902, nine of them for hydraulic equipment: nozzles, valves, and regulators. His last patented invention was a mold for reflective prism-glass; the patent (No. 1,925,096) was issued in September 1933.

Hunter died March 19, 1935, at his home in Philadelphia, having never gained the level of recognition he sought as an inventor, and having never, apparently, renounced his transmutation claims. A stroke, The New York Times reported in its obituary, "contributed to his death." His remains lie in Chelten Hills Abbey, a notable (but sadly deteriorating) art-deco mausoleum at Philadelphia’s Chelten Hills Cemetery.
