= Patrick Russell (judge) =

British judge (1926–2002)

Sir Thomas Patrick Russell PC (30 July 1926 – 28 October 2002), styled The Rt Hon Lord Justice Russell was a judge of the High Court of England and Wales and Lord Justice.

Born in 1926, one of three brothers, all educated at Urmston Grammar School and all graduates of Manchester University, one of his brothers a chemist, the other a doctor. Russell, the youngest, was called up in 1945 and served in the Intelligence Corps and the Royal Army Service Corps. He read law at Manchester University. A keen sportsman, and especially a cricketer, he captained the university's first eleven, continuing his lifelong passion for cricket.

Russell was called to the bar in 1949 and entered the chambers of Arthur Jalland in Manchester, (later Ship Canal House and subsequently Peel Court Chambers), and practised on the Northern circuit. He was prosecuting Counsel to the Post Office (1961–70), Assistant Recorder of Bolton (1963–70) and Recorder of Barrow-in-Furness (1970–71). He took silk in 1971 and was Leader of the Northern Circuit from 1978 until 1980, when he was appointed to the High Court.

Russell was presiding judge on the Northern Circuit from 1983 to 1987, when he was appointed to the Court of Appeal, where, among other high-profile cases, he sat in the libel appeals of Private Eye against Sonia Sutcliffe and of Count Nikolai Tolstoy against Lord Aldington. In 1991 he was one of five members of the Court of Appeal who abolished the immunity of a husband from prosecution for rape in the case of R v R.

Russell played cricket for Urmston Cricket club until he was in his forties. He was also chairman of Lancashire County Cricket Club from 1999 until 2001.
