= Alfred Hopkinson =

British lawyer and politician (1851–1939)

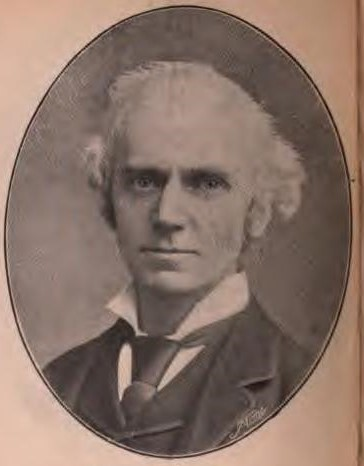
- Hopkinson in 1895
- Born: 28 June 1851; Manchester
- Died: 11 November 1939 (aged 88); Long Meadow, Bovingdon, Hertfordshire
- Education: LL.D (Glasgow)
- Alma mater: Lincoln College, Oxford
- Occupation: Mechanical engineer
- Children: John Hopkinson; Austin Hopkinson
- Relatives: John Hopkinson (brother) Edward Hopkinson (brother); Tom Hopkinson grandson Georgina Battiscombe (grand-daughter); Katharine Chorley (niece) Bertram Hopkinson (nephew); Sir Gerald Hurst (son-in-law) George Harwood (son-in-law)

Sir Alfred Hopkinson (28 June 1851 – 11 November 1939) was an English lawyer, academic and politician who was a member of parliament (MP) for two three-year periods, separated by nearly 30 years.

He was the son of John Hopkinson, a mechanical engineer, and among his brothers were John Hopkinson, a physicist and electrical engineer, and Edward Hopkinson, an electrical engineer and MP. He first stood for election to the House of Commons at the 1885 general election, when he was the unsuccessful Liberal Party candidate in Manchester East. He was unsuccessful again as a Liberal Unionist candidate at the 1892 general election, when he stood in Manchester South-West.

Hopkinson finally won a seat at the 1895 general election, when he was elected as MP for Cricklade in Wiltshire. He resigned from Parliament in February 1898, by the procedural device of accepting appointment as Steward of the Chiltern Hundreds.

He was elected to membership of the Manchester Literary and Philosophical Society the same year on 29 November 1898,

Hopkinson was vice-chancellor of the Victoria University from 1901 to 15 July 1903 and then of the Victoria University of Manchester until 1913. In December 1914, he was appointed to the Committee on Alleged German Outrages which, in May 1915, reported on German war crimes against civilians during the invasion of Belgium in the opening months of the First World War.

He received the honorary degree of Doctor of Laws (LL.D) from the University of Glasgow in June 1901. He was awarded a knighthood in 1910.

He returned to Parliament in March 1926, when he won a by-election for the Combined English Universities as a Conservative. He did not contest the 1929 general election.

A sculpture of him by John Cassidy was exhibited in Manchester in 1912. His son, Austin Hopkinson, also became a member of parliament. Another son, John, became Archdeacon of Westmorland. One of his daughters, Margaret Alice, married Sir Gerald Hurst MP and another, Ellen, married George Harwood MP. A granddaughter, Georgina Harwood, became a well-known biographer under her married name of Georgina Battiscombe.

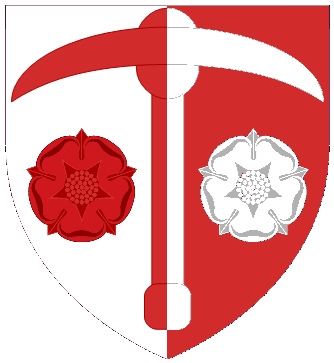
Arms, displayed at Lincoln's Inn.

Parliament of the United Kingdom
Preceded by John Husband	Member of Parliament for Cricklade; 1895 – 1898	Succeeded by Lord Edmond Fitzmaurice
Preceded by Herbert Fisher; Sir Martin Conway	Member of Parliament for the Combined English Universities; 1926 – 1929; With: Sir Martin Conway	Succeeded by Eleanor Rathbone; Sir Martin Conway
