= Baron Chorley =

Barony in the Peerage of the United Kingdom

Baron Chorley, of Kendal in the County of Westmorland, is a title in the Peerage of the United Kingdom. It was created on 16 November 1945 for the barrister, academic and Labour politician, Robert Chorley. He was Sir Ernest Cassel Professor of Commercial and Industrial Law at the University of London from 1930 to 1946 and served as a Lord-in-waiting (government whip in the House of Lords) from 1946 to 1950 in the Labour administration of Clement Attlee. The second Baron, who succeeded his father in 1978, was one of the ninety elected hereditary peers elected remain in the House of Lords after the passing of the House of Lords Act of 1999, where he sat as a cross-bencher. As of 2016 the title is held by his son.

== Barons Chorley (1945) ==
- Robert Samuel Theodore Chorley, 1st Baron Chorley (1895–1978)
- Roger Richard Edward Chorley, 2nd Baron Chorley (1930–2016)
- Nicholas Rupert Debenham Chorley, 3rd Baron Chorley (born 1966), educated at Marlborough College followed by Durham University (BSc) and Edinburgh University (MSc); Director at IT firm Hexagon Safety and Infrastructure

The heir apparent is the present holder's son Hon. Patrick Chorley (b. 2000).

== Arms ==
Coat of arms of Baron Chorley
Crest In front of two torches in saltire Or and inflamed a teazle stalked and leaved Proper. Escutcheon Per chevron Argent and Vert in chief two bluebottles Proper and in base a fountain. Supporters On either side a buzzard Proper. Motto Propositi Tenax (Tenacious of Purpose)
