= Katharine Chorley =

British writer and mountaineer

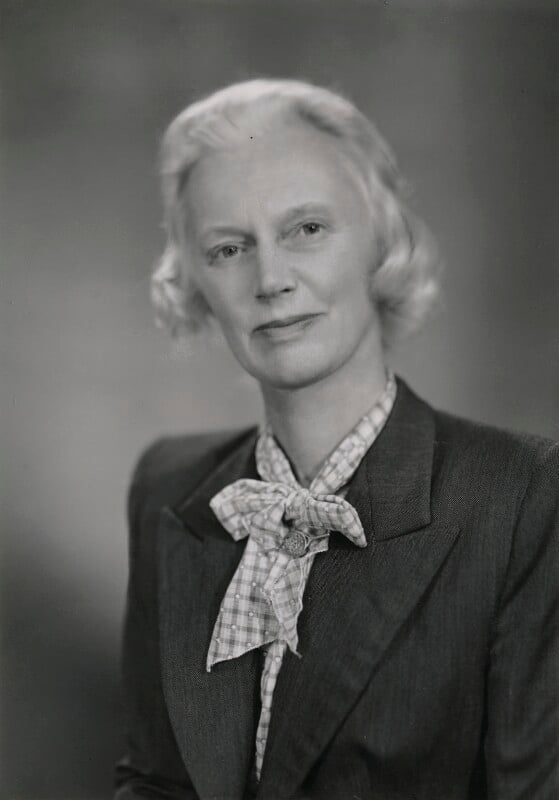
- Chorley in 1950
- Born: 15 November 1897; Timperley
- Died: 2 October 1986 (aged 88); London
- Occupations: Writer and mountaineer
- Spouse: Robert Chorley, 1st Baron Chorley
- Children: Roger Chorley, 2nd Baron Chorley
- Father: Edward Hopkinson
- Relatives: Alfred Hopkinson (uncle); John Hopkinson (uncle) Bertram Hopkinson (cousin) Austin Hopkinson (cousin) John Hopkinson (cousin)

Katharine Chorley, Lady Chorley (née Hopkinson) (1897–1986) was a British writer and mountaineer.

== Biography ==
Katharine Campbell Chorley (née Hopkinson) was born on 15 November 1897, the youngest of Edward Hopkinson's two children. She married Robert Chorley (Theo) on 15 April 1925, he was raised to the peerage in 1945, as Baron Chorley of Kendal in the County of Westmorland, and Katharine Chorley thereby became Lady Chorley. They had two sons and a daughter, the eldest son became Roger Chorley, 2nd Baron Chorley on the death of his father in January 1978. Lady Chorley died in London on 2 October 1986.

Katharine Chorley was born in Timperley but, apart from the period 1911-1914 when she attended school in Folkestone, she spent most of her childhood at the family home in Alderley Edge. During WWI she served as a member of a Voluntary Aid Detachment and once the war was over she acted as her father's secretary.

She wrote, "When I was in my twenties, I had two special ambitions. The one was to learn to write English prose, the other was to become a good mountaineer".

== Mountaineering ==
There was a long tradition of mountaineering in her family. Her father and his brothers Alfred and Charles were members of the Alpine Club, as was another brother, the physicist John Hopkinson FRS (1849–1898) who died in a mountaineering accident near Arolla in 1898 along with two of his daughters and a son. (Note: p.5, 207) During the last three decades of the 19th century her father and his brothers all climbed regularly in the Alps and they were involved in numerous significant first ascents, particularly in the Lake District. But, after her uncle's fatal accident, neither her father or his remaining brothers ever climbed seriously again. However, there were family holidays in the mountains and Katharine recalls climbing Cadair Idris at the age of 7 or 8 (Note: p.209) and being impressed by a holiday to Romsdal in 1908 (Note: p.209) (a place she returned to about 25 years later when she climbed the Romsdalshorn). At the age of 14, when she visited Switzerland on a family holiday which took in Mürren and from Zermatt, (Note: p.226-228) she had her first experience of crossing a glacier and she reached the Theodule Pass. (Note: p.209)

These modest expeditions only whetted her appetite for more serious courses, she wrote "I longed to climb, but got no encouragement at home, though secretly I think father sympathised with my aspirations". (Note: p.207) At the age of 17 she was hoping that this would be changed by the family holiday plans to stay in Argentiere during the summer of 1914 and that "somehow or another father would get round the ban on alpine climbing and see to it that I got at least a taste of snow and ice" (Note: p.263) - but Britain's entry into the Great War at the start of August prevented this. However, after the war Katherine took things into her own hands and joined the Fell and Rock Climbing Club (FRCC) and later became "one of the (FRCC) Club's most active members". It was through the FRCC that she met her future husband, in the Lake District, their honeymoon was spent in Snowdonia and subsequently most of their holidays were spent in the Lake District.

In 1953, she was elected vice-president of the FRCC, after having been editor of the FRCC Journal from 1928 to 1930 and 1943–1945. She joined the Ladies' Alpine Club in 1935 and was later elected as its president (1953–1955). She also became a member of the Alpine Club.

She continued climbing in the Alps, and even achieved the ascent of Piz Kesch in the Rhaetian Alps in her early 70s.

== Writings ==
Chorley's book Armies and the Art of Revolution was written before World War II, but was not published until 1943. It is widely cited and even in 2008 it was described as "the classic analytical comparative study". In the 1970s, it was included in the main text compiled specifically for US Army training courses. The text was still used at least until the late 1980s.

Chorley contributed to C. E. M. Joad's 1948 work The English Counties Illustrated by writing the chapters on Westmorland and Cumberland.

Other work included a biography and appraisal of the works of the poet Arthur Hugh Clough and several articles in The Month about Wordsworth.

She also wrote numerous articles in mountaineering journals, particularly those of the Fell and Rock Climbing Club and the Ladies' Alpine Club. In the 1950s, she regularly contributed to The Tablet. With Nea Morin, she translated Marc Azema's book The Conquest of Fitzroy (1957).

== Bibliography ==
- Hills and Highways (1928), J M Dent and Sons, with engravings by Margaret Pilkington
- Armies and the Art of Revolution (1943), Faber & Faber
- The English Counties Illustrated (1948) (Chorley contributed the chapters on Westmorland and Cumberland), Odhams
- Manchester Made Them, first published (1950) by Faber & Faber
- Arthur Hugh Clough: The uncommitted mind: A study of his life and poetry (1962), Clarendon Press
- The Mountaineer's Companion (1966), edited by Michael Ward (Chorley contributed the chapter "Mountains and Painters")
