= John Hopkinson (priest) =

British Anglican archdeacon

Rev. John Hopkinson
- Born: 1877; Fallowfield, Lancashire
- Died: 22 October 1957 (aged 79–80)
- Education: University College, Oxford
- Occupations: Cleric, archdeacon of Westmorland
- Children: Tom Hopkinson
- Father: Sir Alfred Hopkinson, K.C.
- Relatives: Austin Hopkinson, MP (brother); John Hopkinson (uncle); Edward Hopkinson (uncle) Bertram Hopkinson (cousin) Katharine Chorley (cousin)

John Henry Hopkinson (1877 - 22 October 1957) was Archdeacon of Westmorland from 1931 until 1944.

== Personal life and early education ==
He was a son of the lawyer and politician Sir Alfred Hopkinson, nephew of the physicist John Hopkinson and the electrical engineer Edward Hopkinson, and brother of the MP Austin Hopkinson. He was educated at Dulwich College and University College, Oxford. He married Evelyn Mary Fountaine, the daughter of a Lincolnshire vicar. Their four sons included the journalist and George Orwell biographer Tom Hopkinson and Brigadier Paul Hopkinson (1906-1991), who was the commanding officer of the 152nd (Indian) Parachute Battalion at the Battle of Shangshak.

He died on 22 October 1957.

== Career ==
He was a lecturer in Greek at Birmingham University, then warden of Hulme Hall, Manchester and a lecturer in Archaeology at the University of Manchester from 1904 to 1914, before his ordination in 1914. He served as a private in the Royal Army Medical Corps during World War I. He held incumbencies at Holy Trinity Church, Colne; Christ Church, Moss Side; St Oswald, Burneside and Christ Church, Cockermouth. He was also diocesan organiser of religious education and examining chaplain to the bishop of Carlisle from 1928 to 1944.
