= Split-Hopkinson pressure bar =

Apparatus for testing the dynamic stress-strain response of materials

The split-Hopkinson pressure bar (SHPB), named after Bertram Hopkinson, sometimes also called a Kolsky bar, is an apparatus for testing the dynamic stress–strain response of materials.

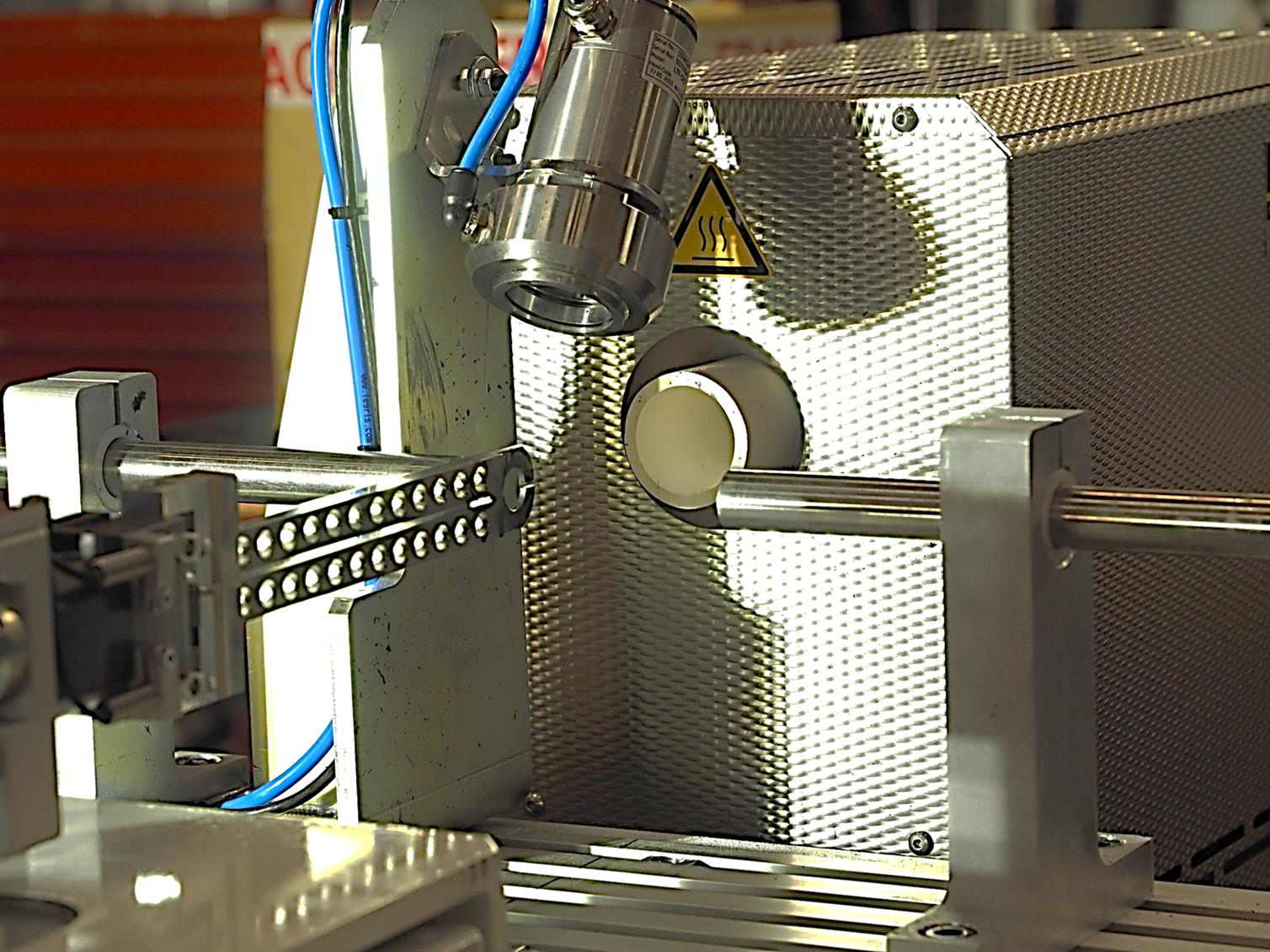
Hopkinson bars

== History ==
The Hopkinson pressure bar was first suggested by Bertram Hopkinson in 1914 as a way to measure stress pulse propagation in a metal bar. Later, in 1949 Herbert Kolsky refined Hopkinson's technique by using two Hopkinson bars in series, now known as the split-Hopkinson bar, to measure stress and strain, incorporating advancements in the cathode ray oscilloscope in conjunction with electrical condenser units to record the pressure wave propagation in the pressure bars as pioneered by Rhisiart Morgan Davies a year earlier in 1948.

Later modifications have allowed for tensile, compression, and torsion testing.

== Operation ==
Although there are various setups and techniques currently in use for the split-Hopkinson pressure bar, the underlying principles for the test and measurement are the same. The specimen is placed between the ends of two straight bars, called the incident bar and the transmitted bar. At the end of the incident bar (some distance away from the specimen, typically at the far end), a stress wave is created which propagates through the bar toward the specimen. This wave is referred to as the incident wave, and upon reaching the specimen, splits into two smaller waves. One of which, the transmitted wave, travels through the specimen and into the transmitted bar, causing plastic deformation in the specimen. The other wave, called the reflected wave, is reflected away from the specimen and travels back down the incident bar.

Most modern setups use strain gauges on the bars to measure strains caused by the waves. Assuming deformation in the specimen is uniform, the stress and strain can be calculated from the amplitudes of the incident, transmitted, and reflected waves.

== Compression testing ==
For compression testing, two symmetrical bars are situated in series, with the sample in between. The incident bar is struck by a striker bar during testing. The striker bar is fired from a gas gun. The transmitted bar collides with a momentum trap (typically a block of soft metal). Strain gauges are mounted on both the incident and transmitted bars.

== Tension testing ==
Tension testing in a Split Hopkinson pressure bar (SHPB) is more complex due to a variation of loading methods and specimen attachment to the incident and transmission bar. The first tension bar was designed and tested by Harding et al. in 1960; the design involved using a hollow weight bar that was connected to a yoke and threaded specimen inside of the weight bar. A tensile wave was created by impacting the weight bar with a ram and having the initial compression wave reflect as a tensile wave off the free end Another breakthrough in the SHPB design was done by Nichols who used a typical compression setup and threaded metallic specimens on both the incident and transmission ends, while placing a composite collar over the specimen. The specimen had a snug fit on the incident and transmission side in order to bypass an initial compression wave. Nichols' setup would create an initial compression wave by an impact in the incident end with a striker, but when the compression wave reached the specimen, the threads would not be loaded. The compression wave would ideally pass through the composite collar and then reflect off the free end in tension. The tensile wave would then pull on the specimen. The next loading method was revolutionized by Ogawa in 1984. A hollow striker was used to impact a flange that is threaded to end on an incident bar. This striker was propelled by using either a gas gun or a rotating disk. The specimen was once again attached to the incident and transmission bar via threading.

== Torsion testing ==
As with tension testing, there exist a variety of methods for specimen attachment and loading when subjecting materials to torsion on a SHPB.

One way of applying loading called the stored-torque method involves clamping the midsection of the incident bar while a torque is applied to the free end. The incident wave is created by suddenly releasing the clamp, which sends a torsion wave toward the specimen.

Another loading technique known as explosive-loading uses explosive charges on the free end of the incident bar to create the incident wave. This method is particularly sensitive to error because each charge must apply an equal impulse to the incident bar (to create pure torsion without bending) and must both detonate simultaneously. Explosive-loading is also unlikely to produce clean incident waves, which may cause uneven strain rates throughout the test. This method however has the advantage of having a very small rise time as compared to the stored-torque method.

== See also ==
- Short Course on Split Hopkinson Bar and Related Topics
- List of historic mechanical engineering landmarks
