= Austin Hopkinson =

British politician (1879–1962)

Austin Hopkinson MP JP
- Hopkinson in 1924

Member of Parliament for Mossley

Personal details
- Born: 24 June 1879 Manchester, England
- Died: 2 September 1962 (aged 83) London, England
- Party: Independent
- Parent: Alfred Hopkinson
- Relatives: John Hopkinson (brother); John Hopkinson (uncle); Edward Hopkinson (uncle) Bertram Hopkinson (cousin) Katharine Chorley (cousin)

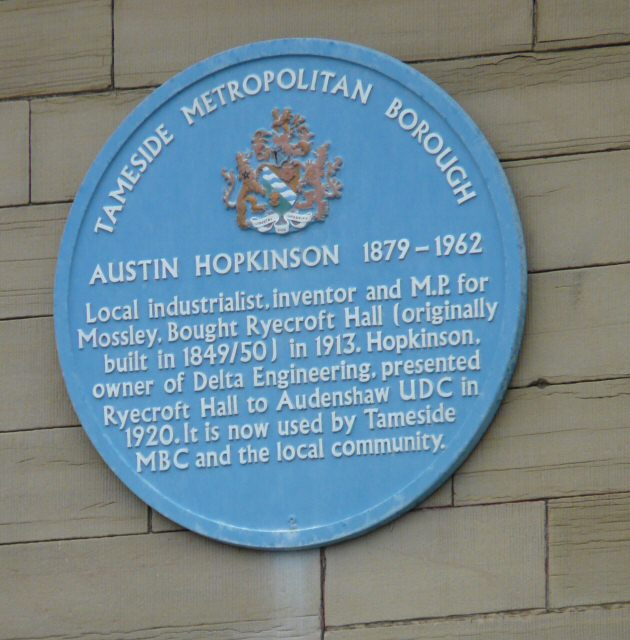
Blue plaque honouring Hopkinson at Ryecroft Hall

Austin Hopkinson JP (24 June 1879 – 2 September 1962) was a British industrialist and Member of Parliament (MP) who represented Mossley as an Independent from 1918 to 1929 and 1931 to 1945. He was also a noted benefactor to local causes, and a strong believer in noblesse oblige.

== Early life ==
Alfred Augustine Hopkinson was born in Manchester on 24 June 1879 the son of Sir Alfred Hopkinson KC who was Vice-Chancellor of the University of Manchester from 1900 to 1913 and also served as Member of Parliament for Cricklade in the 1890s and for Combined English Universities in the 1920s. Although sharing the academic approach of his father, he applied his experience more directly to the problems of industry rather than taking up posts in the universities. He became a Justice of the Peace for Lancashire.

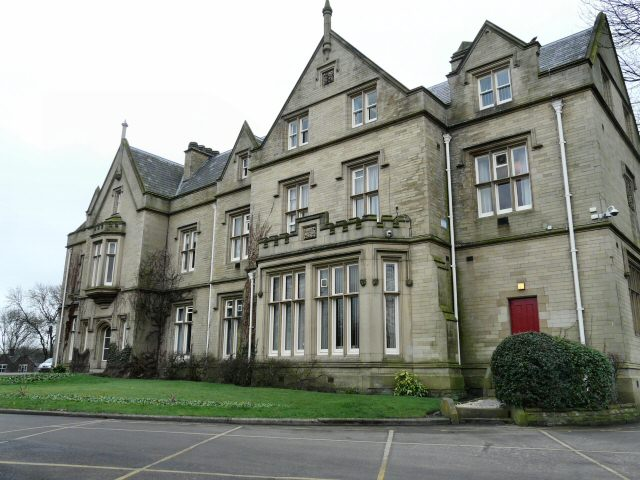
Ryecroft Hall

In 1900 Hopkinson enlisted in the Imperial Yeomanry and served in the Second Boer War as a lieutenant. On his return he founded a company, Pikrose (which bore the Audenshaw coat of arms as its company logo) at the Delta Works in Audenshaw. In 1908 he invented a revolutionary coal-cutting machine which his company made: he built a reputation as a very humane employer, and while the company was highly profitable he was uninterested in the trappings of wealth and lived frugally.

Hopkinson was elected as a councillor on Audenshaw Council from 1917 to 1934 and led the council from 1923 to 1924 and 1928–29. Long before it became fashionable, Hopkinson converted a derelict barn to a bungalow for his own home; he donated his former home of Ryecroft Hall (which he had bought in February 1913) to the people of Audenshaw and sixteen semi-detached houses on its land to Audenshaw Council (the Hall became a community centre as well as Audenshaw council's headquarters, and the houses were used for the housing of the working class). During the First World War he again enlisted and served in the Royal Dragoon Guards as a Second Lieutenant; in the later stages of the war he re-enlisted as a Trooper (the equivalent of Private) in the same unit.

== Entry to politics ==
On 11 September 1918 news was received confirming that Cpt. Hon. Oswald Cawley (Liberal MP for Prestwich) had been killed in action in Palestine on 22 August. Hopkinson was picked as a Government-supporting Liberal candidate to succeed him, although he was not a member of any party; he was returned unopposed at the by-election on 28 October. On taking his seat he wore his uniform as a Trooper of the Royal Dragoon Guards.

Hopkinson did not have time to get acquainted with the House before the end of the war pitched him into a re-election battle. Owing to boundary changes he fought the new Mossley constituency where he was adopted as a Liberal who supported David Lloyd George's governing Coalition. However, during the campaign he said that calling himself the Coalition candidate did not bind him to supporting the Coalition, and that he might oppose anything the government did. He insisted that he had merely taken the 'badge' of the Coalition for the good of the country. Hopkinson faced opposition only from the Co-operative Party and won with more than 75% of the vote.

== Political activities ==
Initially, as shown by his choice of taking his seat in uniform, Hopkinson was particularly active on military matters, calling for 'democracy under discipline' and a recognition that democratic forces were present when reconstructing the Army. He was a member of the House of Commons Army Committee in 1919, and the following year criticised the actions of Brigadier-General Dyer in the Amritsar massacre following the official report into it. Also in 1920 he criticised bureaucracy in the building of public housing, saying that he was building homes for a fraction of the price (it was in 1921 that he made his donation of Ryecroft Hall).

By the end of 1920 Hopkinson was already making a reputation for being one of the best speakers and most independent minds in the House, although he was still officially sitting as a Coalition Liberal. He became increasingly involved in industrial topics in which he was critical of the trades unions (regarding them as having devoured the liberty of the workers) and of socialism to the level of distrusting the motives of those advocating socialist policies. He was a strong supporter of free trade. Hopkinson was much in demand as a speaker because of his unorthodox views and the frank and clear way in which he expressed them.

== Independence ==
On 22 March 1922 Hopkinson wrote to The Times to suggest that ballot papers include a box in which voters could express their disapproval of all the candidates on offer. He was by now of this opinion himself: the previous month, he stopped receiving the Coalition Liberal whip, which he explained, his friends in the Liberal Party had been sending him by courtesy but which he had never considered binding. He strongly criticised as "humbug" the 1922 budget which reduced income tax without any corresponding reduction in government spending.

At the 1922 general election Hopkinson therefore found himself opposed by an official Liberal Party candidate who had been Lord Mayor of Manchester in 1921–22. However, his local connections and good works saw Hopkinson re-elected with 58% of the vote. At the 1923 election, Hopkinson's outspoken support for free trade helped him fight off a renewed attempt by the Liberal Party to regain the seat, although his majority was reduced to only 375 votes. The local Conservative Party supported him at these elections, and despite his support for free trade he backed the Baldwin government in the motion of no confidence in January 1924. Hopkinson grew personally very friendly with Baldwin.

At the Westminster Abbey by-election in March 1924, Hopkinson signed the nomination papers for Winston Churchill who had fallen out with the Liberal Party and was standing as an Independent Constitutionalist. Although Churchill failed on this occasion, it was only by 43 votes. At the 1924 general election, Hopkinson had opposition from both the Labour Party and the Liberals; he was re-elected more comfortably with Labour outpolling the Liberal candidate by more than two to one.

== Baldwin ==
In March 1926 Hopkinson had the pleasure of formally introducing his father Alfred to the House of Commons, after he won a by-election in the Combined English Universities. His father was, unlike him, elected as a Conservative, although Hopkinson was a generally reliable vote for the Conservatives in this period. After the general strike he was critical of the actions of the trade unions. However, he opposed the Baldwin government's Trades Disputes Bill which restricted union powers, on the grounds that it would hinder those trade unionists committed to reform from changing their unions, and also hinder employers who were committed to improving the liberty of their employees.

By the late 1920s, Hopkinson was expressing the hope that Stanley Baldwin would be elected as a free trader in order to save the country from David Lloyd George who had left the country open to socialism "and its twin brother, protection". He was again supported by the Conservatives in the 1929 general election, but in one of the shock results of the election, lost his seat by 5,029 votes to Herbert Gibson, the Labour candidate. Hopkinson kept up his contribution of articles expressing unorthodox thoughts to journals while out of Parliament, blaming the Wall Street crash of 1929 on an American attempt to restrict imports.

== Return to Parliament ==
At the 1931 general election Hopkinson attempted to regain his seat but found himself opposed by an official Conservative Party candidate as well as the sitting Labour MP. He declared himself a supporter of the National Government. Having unexpectedly lost in 1929, Hopkinson managed to win his seat back in an equally unexpected result. The Conservative candidate was in third place.

Hopkinson continued to support free trade and Baldwin, and in the 1935 general election the putative Conservative candidate withdrew in his favour. Baldwin wrote to Hopkinson (under the salutation "Dear Hoppy") that "You have been one of my most loyal supporters in good times and in bad when I needed friends most". Hopkinson had a straight fight with Labour and the official backing of the National government, saying that he would take the National Government whip if elected. He won by only 2,170 votes in a constituency that was suffering in the economic difficulties.

In March 1936 Hopkinson was injured in a flying accident, aviation having long been a private hobby. He was making a forced landing in bad weather near Warrington when his aeroplane overturned; fortunately it hit a hedge and did not crush him. Unluckily he suffered light injuries in a second accident the next month, at Rochester airport in Kent when his aircraft went into a spin. In March 1938 Hopkinson was hit by a car near his home, and had to recover in hospital.

== Rearmament and war ==
Hopkinson's knowledge of flying led to his strong support for rearmament especially of the Royal Air Force and on 16 November 1938 he declared that the Chamberlain government's inadequate action in that area made it impossible for him to continue to support the government, and resigned the whip. In an article he wrote shortly after, he declared that Conservative Associations should not select "crooks and half-wits" as Parliamentary candidates. However he continued to back the government on the issue of Palestine.

Hopkinson considered his warnings had been amply justified when the Second World War broke out. He re-enlisted at age 60, this time in the Royal Navy on the declaration of war, serving from 1939 to 1942. During breaks in his service he voted against Chamberlain after the Norway debate of 1940, and supported Churchill's policy of 'total war', but opposed the use of secret sessions of the House of Commons to suppress public criticism of the performance of Ministers. In 1942 a corrupted report of a speech of his was printed in the This England column of the New Statesman in which he was supposed to have declared himself an autocrat. Hopkinson sued for libel, describing the statement as a travesty. The New Statesman eventually agreed to pay 50 guineas to the RAF Benevolent Fund in damages, and Hopkinson's costs. The same erroneous report also appeared in Reynolds News and Hopkinson won £500 damages from them.

As the war was coming to an end, Hopkinson uncovered a financial scandal involving the Air Ministry and the British Overseas Airways Corporation in a speech on 19 December 1944. He opposed the outcome of the Yalta Conference which accepted a Soviet sphere of influence in eastern Europe.

== Later life ==
At the 1945 general election, Hopkinson was for the first time opposed by all three main parties. He was by then in his mid-60s and had less ability to be active in his constituency, and also his outspoken criticisms of the Labour Party were not in line with the times. Not only did he lose his seat in the election, but he came in bottom of the poll with only 8% of the vote and thereby lost his deposit, the threshold being 12.5%. Hopkinson retired from politics but lived mainly in Westminster at 61 St George's Square. A portrait of him by William Dring was exhibited at the Royal Academy Summer Exhibition of 1955.

Hopkinson never married.

Parliament of the United Kingdom
Preceded by Oswald Cawley	Member of Parliament for Prestwich; October 1918–December 1918	Constituency abolished
New constituency	Member of Parliament for Mossley; 1918–1929	Succeeded by Herbert Gibson
Preceded by Herbert Gibson	Member of Parliament for Mossley; 1931–1945	Succeeded by George Woods
