= Hopkinson effect =

Feature of ferromagnetic or ferrimagnetic materials

Thermomagnetic susceptibility curve for magnetite exhibiting a strong Hopkinson effect

The Hopkinson effect is a feature of ferromagnetic or ferrimagnetic materials, in which an increase in magnetic susceptibility is observed at temperatures between the blocking temperature and the Curie temperature of the material. The Hopkinson effect can be observed as a peak in thermomagnetic curves that immediately precedes the susceptibility drop associated with the Curie temperature. It was first observed by John Hopkinson in 1889 in a study on iron.

In single domain particles, a large Hopkinson peak results from a transient superparamagnetic particle domain state.

== See also ==
- Ferroelectricity – Property of materials which both possess and are affected by electric fields
- Curie's law – Relation of magnetization to applied magnetic field and temperature
