= John Birkinbine =

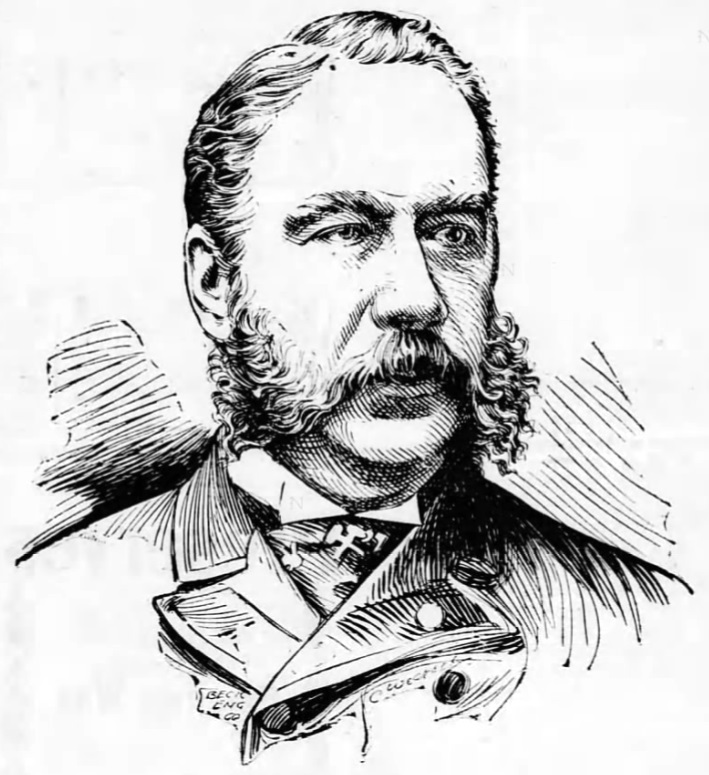
Portrait of John Birkinbine from 1899

John Birkinbine (November 16, 1844 – May 14, 1915) was an American mining engineer who worked alongside Thomas Edison during 1881 at the Edison Ore-Milling Company.

== Early life ==
Birkinbine was born November 16, 1844, in Reading, Pennsylvania, to parents Henry P M Birkinbine and Louise Yocum as their eldest son. His father was a hydraulic engineer.

He was educated in public schools and Friends' High School in Philadelphia, as well as Hill School in Pottstown, Pennsylvania, and the Polytechnic College of Pennsylvania. In 1863, he undertook 1 year of military service, although his subsequent studies were interrupted by a vision imperfection.

== Career ==
His father worked as chief engineer of Philadelphia Water Department for a decade, during which time John Birkinbine received training in field engineering and hydrographic surveys. He was associated with designing and constructing various public water supplies and later worked as a consulting engineer.

He served two terms as a president of American Institute of Mining Engineers. For a number of years during the late 19th century, he was connected with the United States Geological Survey and was regarded by the government as being "an expert on iron and manganese ores". He was called to the majority of states in America, as well as to other countries such as Canada and Maxico and examine and report upon iron ore mines, as well as to assist in designing and constructing new blast furnaces.

Around 1905, he was the Head of New State Water Supply for Pennsylvania. By 1910, he had compiled a map showing the distribution of iron ores across the United States following years of studying ore shipments and was by then described as being "one of the foremost mineralogists of the country". Among his other accomplishments included developing a scheme for utilizing the water power of Niagara Falls and devising blast furnaces for use in the Lake Superior copper region.

== Death ==
He died on May 14, 1915 of heart failure. He was survived by his widow and nine children, comprising four sons and five daughters. His funeral was held on May 17 and he was interred at Westminster cemetery.
