= Herbert Gibson (politician) =

Herbert Mellor Gibson (22 February 1896 – 27 March 1954) was a member of the British co-operative movement and a Labour politician.

Gibson was the youngest of five children, who was brought up in poverty after his mother was widowed. He first gained employment as an office boy at Manchester Town Hall, and worked for many years in local government. He studied economics and political history at the Co-operative College, Holyoake House.

At the 1929 general election he was nominated as the Labour and Co-operative candidate for the Mossley constituency and successfully unseated the sitting MP, Austin Hopkinson. His membership of parliament was short-lived, and Hopkinson regained the seat at the next election in 1931.

Gibson continued his involvement with co-operatives, becoming a director of the Co-operative Wholesale Society in 1936, at the same time leaving the employment of the local council. He subsequently held the post of chairman of the English and Scottish Joint Co-operative Society, was a director of the Manchester Ship Canal Company. He was appointed a member of the Joint Industrial Council of the Soap, Candle and Edible Fats Industries and a director of the Colonial Development Corporation. He died in March 1954 aged 58.

Parliament of the United Kingdom
Preceded by Austin Hopkinson	Member of Parliament for Mossley; 1929–1931	Succeeded by Austin Hopkinson
