= Edward Hopkinson =

British electrical engineer and politician

Dr Edward Hopkinson M.P.
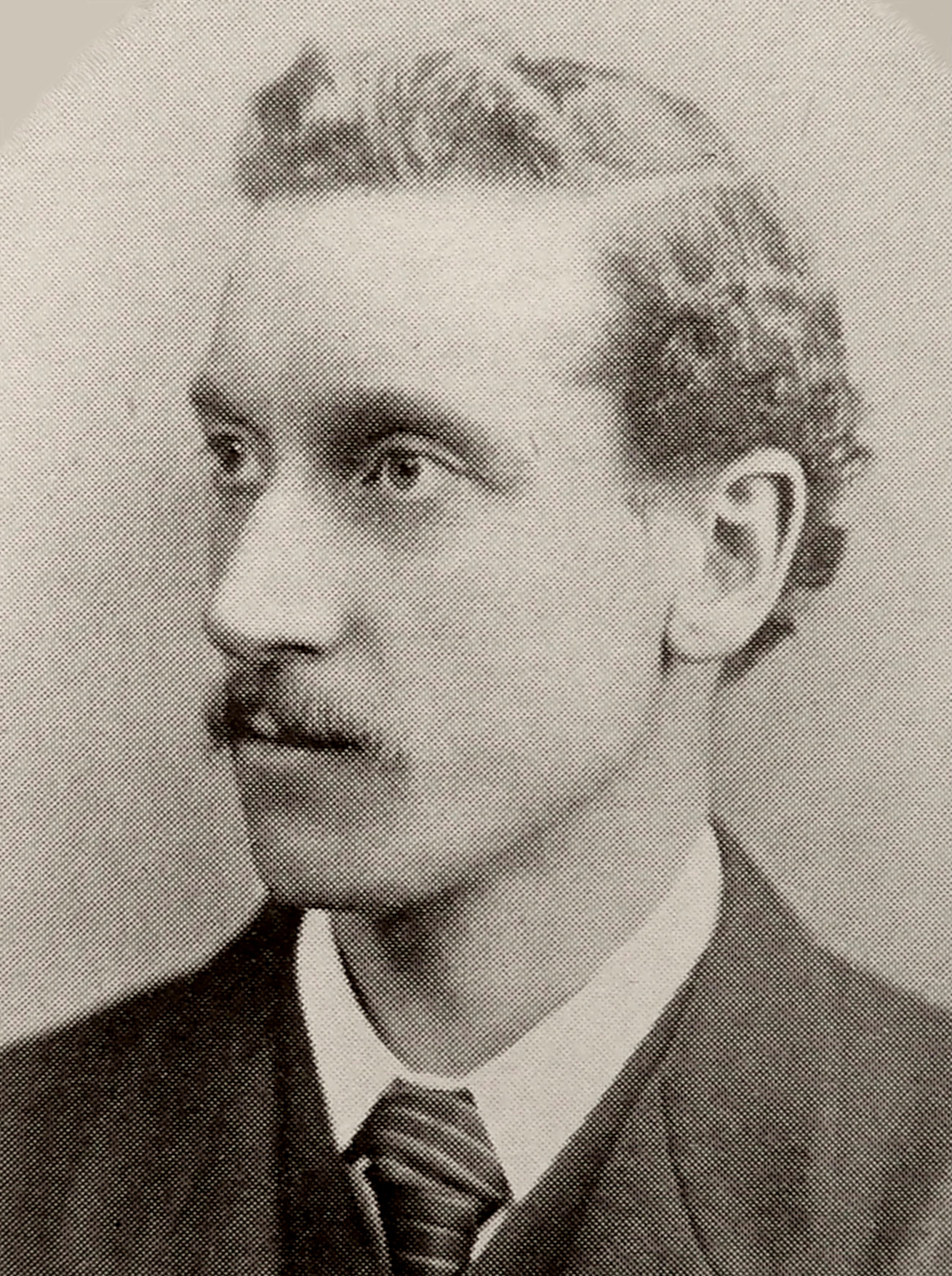
- Born: 28 May 1859; Manchester
- Died: 15 January 1922 (aged 62); Alderley Edge, Cheshire
- Education: University of Manchester, Emmanuel College, Cambridge
- Children: Katharine Chorley
- Parent(s): John Hopkinson, Mayor of Manchester
- Relatives: Alfred Hopkinson (brother); John Hopkinson (brother) Bertram Hopkinson (nephew) Austin Hopkinson (nephew) John Hopkinson (nephew) Robert Chorley (son in-law)
- Engineering career
- Discipline: Civil engineering, mechanical engineering, electrical engineering
- Institutions: Institution of Civil Engineers, Institution of Mechanical Engineers
- Employer: Mather & Platt
- Awards: Telford Medal (1888)

Edward Hopkinson (28 May 1859 – 15 January 1922) was a British civil, mechanical and electrical engineer, and Conservative politician.

== Background and education ==
Hopkinson was the fourth son of John Hopkinson, an engineer who was mayor of Manchester in 1882/83.

Hopkinson was educated at Owen's College, Manchester and Emmanuel College, Cambridge. He graduated from Cambridge in 1881 and was made a fellow of Emmanuel in 1883. In 1882 he began to study mechanical and electrical engineering under Sir William Siemens, and received a doctorate from the University of London.

Hopkinson married Minnie Campbell (1862-1936) of County Antrim, and they had two children, Edward Campbell (1889-1966) and Katharine Campbell (1897-1986). His elder brothers included the noted physicist and engineer John Hopkinson, and Sir Alfred Hopkinson, vice-chancellor of the University of Manchester, and amongst his nephews were engineer and scientist Bertram Hopkinson, and Austin Hopkinson, MP.

He was elected to membership of the Manchester Literary and Philosophical Society on 3 November 1896

Edward Hopkinson died at his residence in Alderley Edge, Cheshire in 1922, aged 62, his wife died in 1936.

== Career ==
Hopkinson was involved in a number of large pioneering electrification projects. These included the Bessbrook and Newry Tramway, the Snaefell Mountain Railway the Blackpool and Fleetwood tramways and the City and South London Railway. For a paper on his pioneering work on the Bessbrook and Newry tramway he was awarded the Telford Medal in 1888 by the Institution of Civil Engineers and for a paper on his work on the C&SLR the George Stephenson Medal in 1893 by the same society. In 1884 he joined Mather and Platt engineering company of Salford as head of the electrical engineering department, and rose to become vice-chairman of the company.

From 1916 to 1918 he was a member of the Indian Industrial Commission.

== Politics ==
In 1918 he was chosen as the Coalition Conservative candidate for the newly formed Clayton constituency of Manchester. He was elected, defeating the Labour MP, J E Sutton.

Parliament of the United Kingdom
New constituency	Member of Parliament for Manchester Clayton; 1918–1922	Succeeded by John Edward Sutton
Professional and academic associations
Preceded by Michael Longridge	President of the Institution of Mechanical Engineers; 1919	Succeeded by Matthew Henry Phineas Riall Sankey
