= Polytechnic College of Pennsylvania =

Defunct engineering school in Philadelphia, Pennsylvania, U.S.

- Type: Private
- Active: 1853–1890
- Location: Philadelphia, Pennsylvania, US

Polytechnic College of Pennsylvania was an engineering school in Philadelphia, Pennsylvania, founded in 1853. It was the eighth school of engineering in the United States and the first to offer degree programs in mechanical engineering, mining engineering, and architecture.

== History ==
Technological progress in the early nineteenth century fostered an interest in the teaching of applied science and engineering. Yale established the Sheffield Scientific School in 1846, Harvard the Lawrence Scientific School in 1847, and Dartmouth the Chandler Scientific School in 1852.

Polytechnic College of Pennsylvania was founded in 1853 by Dr. Alfred L. Kennedy, who took specific inspiration from polytechnic schools in Europe, including the Polytechnische Schule of Carlsruhe and the L'Ecole Centrale des Arts of Paris. Kennedy (1819–1896) studied civil and mining engineering as well as medicine, and graduated from the University of Pennsylvania in 1848. He pursued further study in Europe, studying physiology and physiological chemistry in Paris and Leipzig, and geology and botany in Paris. He lectured on medical chemistry at the Philadelphia College of Medicine and was elected professor there in 1849.

In 1842, he started the Philadelphia School of Chemistry, which became the Polytechnic in 1853 when it received its charter from Pennsylvania. The school was located at the corner of Market Street and West Penn Square in Philadelphia. Kennedy was made president and served until financial problems forced the school to close in 1890.

== Notable alumni ==
- Rachel Bodley, Dean, Women's Medical College of Pennsylvania
- John Birkinbine, mining engineer
- Allen Evans, partner of the architect Frank Furness
- Louis Francine, Colonel who fought in the American Civil War in the Battle of Chancellorsville and the Battle of Gettysburg, where he was wounded and subsequently died
- Rudolph Hunter, inventor, engineer and entrepreneur
- Joseph Earlston Thropp, United States Representative from Pennsylvania
- Ferdinand W. Roebling, son of John A. Roebling, businessman
- Charles G. Roebling, son of John A. Roebling, civil engineer and manufacturer
