= Rhisiart Morgan Davies =

Welsh physicist

- Born: 4 February 1903
- Died: February 1958 (aged 54–55)
- Occupation: Physicist

Rhisiart Morgan Davies (4 February 1903 – 1958) was a Welsh physicist. He was born in Corris, Gwynedd, and attended schools in Machynlleth and Dolgellau before, in 1921, winning a scholarship to study physics at the University College of Wales, Aberystwyth. After graduating first-class honours in physics in 1924, he was appointed to the research staff team in H.M. Signals School in Portsmouth, but did not remain in the position for long, instead returning to Aberystwyth to work, initially, as an assistant lecturer in the physics department, before being appointed a lecturer in 1928. Whilst there he worked on a D.Sc. (Wales) degree for important work on the measurement of dielectric and elastic constants under dynamic conditions, which he completed in 1937.

In 1938 he received a Leverhulme Research Fellowship award, enabling him to work in Cambridge, where he became one of the leading specialists in the study of 'stress waves'. He received a Ph.D. degree from Cambridge for his research on this topic (published in 1948).

He later (following World War II), returned to Aberystwyth as Professor of Physics. For a time (from 1954 to 1956) he was also a vice-principal of the college.

His writings include a series of radio lectures on modern science which he produced in the 1930s, and also a large number of articles which he contributed to scientific journals (e.g. 'Surveys in Mechanics'); of which ‘A Critical Study of the Hopkinson Pressure Bar’ (Trans. Royal Society, 1948) was probably one of the most significant.

He died, aged 55, in February 1958.

== See also ==
- Split-Hopkinson pressure bar
