= Bertram Hopkinson =

British lawyer and academic

Professor, Colonel Bertram Hopkinson F.R.S.
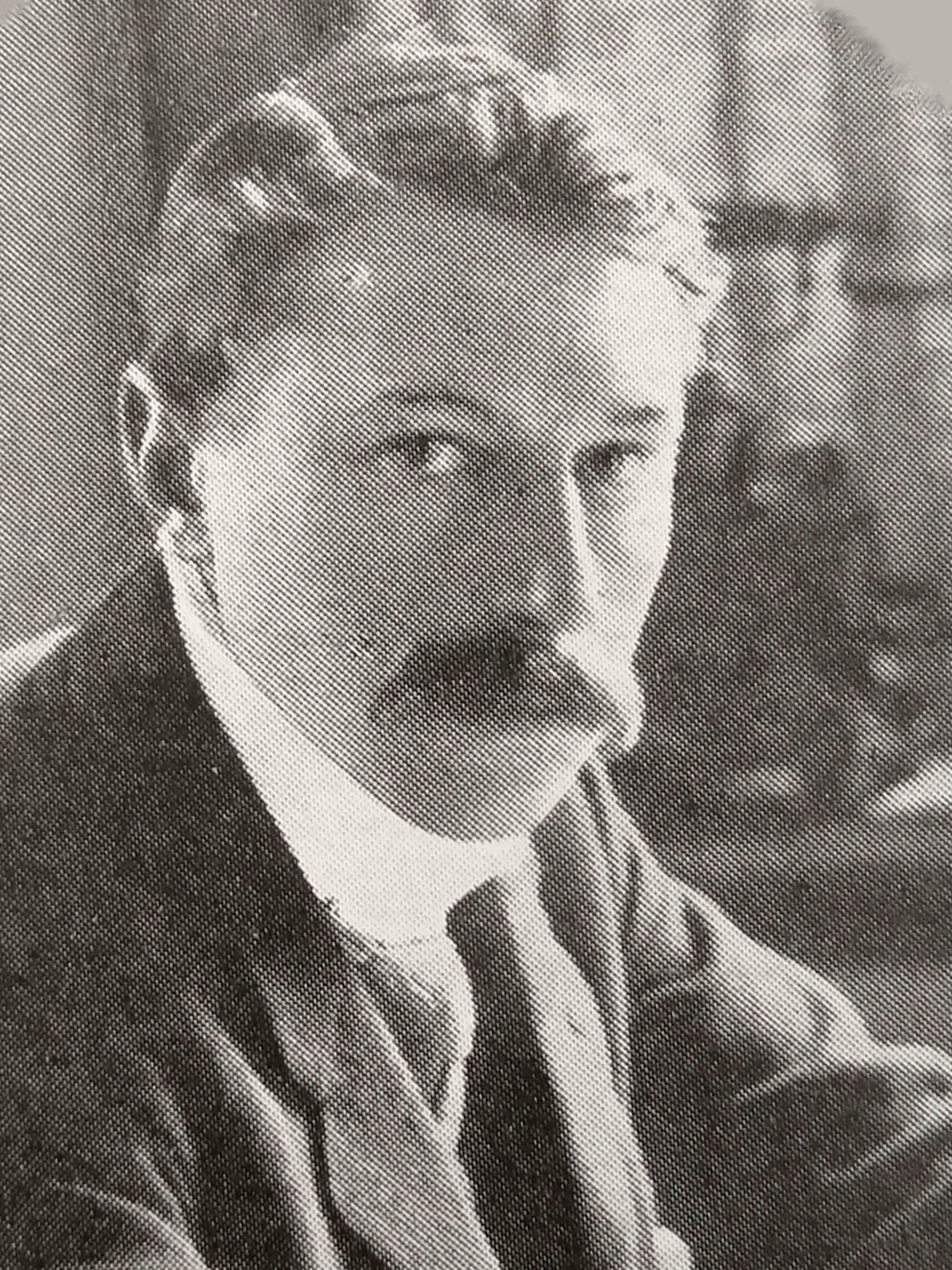
- Born: 11 January 1874; Birmingham
- Died: 26 August 1918 (aged 44); England
- Resting place: Ascension Parish Burial Ground, Cambridge
- Education: St Paul's School, London, King's College, London, Trinity College, Cambridge
- Occupations: Professor of mechanism and applied mechanics, University of Cambridge
- Parent: John Hopkinson
- Relatives: Alfred Hopkinson (uncle) Edward Hopkinson (uncle) Katharine Chorley (cousin); Austin Hopkinson (cousin) John Hopkinson (cousin)
- Engineering career
- Discipline: Civil engineering, mechanical engineering, electrical engineering, patent law
- Institutions: Institution of Civil Engineers, Institution of Mechanical Engineers
- Awards: Fellow of the Royal Society

Bertram Hopkinson CMG FRS MIEE MICE (11 January 1874 – 26 August 1918) was a British patent lawyer and Professor of Mechanism and Applied Mechanics at Cambridge University. In this position he researched flames, explosions and metallurgy and became a pioneer designer of the internal combustion engine.

== Background ==
Hopkinson was born in Birmingham, in 1874, the son of John Hopkinson, an electrical engineer. He read law at Trinity College, Cambridge, and became a lawyer after his graduation. Following the death of his father, brother and two of his sisters in a mountaineering accident in 1898, Hopkinson switched to a career in engineering instead.

== Career ==
In 1903, Hopkinson was elected to the Cambridge chair in mechanism and applied mechanics, and in 1910 he was elected a Fellow of the Royal Society. During World War I he was commissioned into the Royal Engineers, and opened a research establishment at Orford Ness where he and his team researched weapons, sights, and ammunition. In 1915, Hopkinson discovered a similarity relation between the masses of explosive charges and their effects at a given distance. The same similarity relation was discovered independently in 1925 by Karl Julius Cranz in Germany.

== Service in World War I ==
Having become an aviator after joining the army, Hopkinson died on 26 August 1918 when his Bristol Fighter crashed en route from Martlesham Heath to London. He is buried in the Parish of the Ascension Burial Ground in Cambridge, with his wife Mariana, née Siemens; they had seven daughters. At the time of his death he was serving as a Colonel in the Royal Air Force.

== See also ==
- Split-Hopkinson pressure bar

== Notes ==
=== References ===
Secondary sources

- Heyman, Jacques. "Hopkinson, Bertram (1874–1918)". Oxford Dictionary of National Biography.
- Cranz, Karl Julius (1926). Lehrbuch der Ballistik: "Innere Ballistik". Vol. 2. Berlin: Julius Springer. pp. 174 ff.
