= Georgina Battiscombe =

British biographer (1905–2006)

- Born: Esther Georgina Harwood; 21 November 1905; Mayfair, London
- Died: 26 February 2006 (aged 100)
- Education: Lady Margaret Hall, Oxford
- Occupation: Biographer
- Spouse: Christopher Battiscombe (m. 1932; died 1964)
- Children: 1
- Relatives: George Harwood (father); John Murray (stepfather); Alfred Hopkinson (maternal grandfather)
- Writing career
- Notable work: Charlotte Mary Yonge: the Story of an Uneventful Life (1943)

Georgina Battiscombe (21 November 1905 – 26 February 2006) was a British biographer, specialising mainly in lives from the Victorian era.

She was born Esther Georgina Harwood, the elder daughter of George Harwood, a former clergyman, Liberal Member of Parliament for his home town of Bolton, master cotton spinner, and an author and barrister. Her family had a political bent; her maternal grandfather, Sir Alfred Hopkinson, KC (the first Vice-Chancellor of Manchester University), three uncles, and her stepfather, John Murray (Principal of the University College of the South West of England, Exeter), all became MPs.

She was educated at St Michael's School, Oxford, and at Lady Margaret Hall, and once considered a political career herself. In 1932 she married Christopher Battiscombe (d. 1964), a lieutenant-colonel in the Grenadier Guards. For a time they lived in Zanzibar, where Colonel Battiscombe was Secretary to the Sultan. They then lived at Durham before moving to the Henry III Tower at Windsor Castle as Colonel Battiscombe became honorary secretary of the Society of the Friends of St George's from 1958 to 1960.

Her best known books were biographies of the Victorian romantic novelist Charlotte Mary Yonge (1943); Catherine Gladstone, the wife of Prime Minister William Ewart Gladstone (1956); English churchman John Keble (1963); and Alexandra of Denmark (1969). The biography of Keble was awarded the James Tait Black Memorial Prize.

One of the reasons Battiscombe wrote about Queen Alexandra was that she and Alexandra both had the same form of deafness, otosclerosis. Battiscombe was very deaf for a large part of her life, until surgery and a hearing aid corrected this. She said that her experience gave her "some understanding of Alexandra's predicament".

Battiscombe thought that many royal biographies are factually incorrect, and that "so often the unfortunate royalties do not even receive common politeness from those who write about them".

Battiscombe also wrote biographies of Christina Rossetti (1965) and Shaftesbury (1974), and her other titles include Two on Safari (1946); English Picnics (1949); Reluctant Pioneer: The Life of Elizabeth Wordsworth (1978); The Spencers of Althorp (1984); and Winter Song, a book of poems (1992).

Battiscombe became a Fellow of the Royal Society of Literature in 1964. She died in 2006, aged 100.
