= Roger Chorley, 2nd Baron Chorley =

British chartered accountant and peer

The Right Honourable The Lord Chorley
- Chorley in 2011

Member of the House of Lords
- Lord Temporal
- Hereditary peerage 22 March 1978 – 11 November 1999
- Preceded by: The 1st Baron Chorley
- Succeeded by: Seat abolished
- Elected Hereditary Peer; 15 October 2001 – 17 November 2014
- Preceded by: The 7th Earl of Carnarvon
- Succeeded by: The 9th Baron Thurlow

Personal details
- Born: Roger Richard Edward Chorley; 14 August 1930
- Died: 21 February 2016 (aged 85)
- Party: Crossbench
- Parents: 1st Baron Chorley; Katharine Chorley (née Hopkinson)
- Education: Stowe School; Gonville and Caius College
- Occupation: Chartered accountant, politician and peer

Roger Richard Edward Chorley, 2nd Baron Chorley (14 August 1930 – 21 February 2016), was a British chartered accountant and peer.

The son of the Robert Chorley, 1st Baron Chorley, Roger Chorley was educated at Stowe School, Buckinghamshire, and at Gonville and Caius College, Cambridge, where he graduated with a Bachelor of Arts in natural sciences and economics in 1953. He succeeded to his father's title in 1978.

Chorley worked for Coopers and Lybrand from 1954 to 1990, as partner from 1967 to 1989. He was a member of the Royal Commission on the Press between 1974 and 1977, and of the Ordnance Survey Review Committee in 1978 and 1979. From 1980 to 1991, he was also a board member of the Royal National Theatre, and from 1981 to 1999 of the British Council. Between 1991 and 1999, he was also the latter's deputy chairman.

Between 1985 and 1987 Chorley chaired the Committee on Handling of Geographic Information, known as the Chorley Committee. This made recommendations on the conversion of Ordnance Survey maps from paper to computer form, making more Government data available, Grid referencing and Postcode referencing of data, measures to promote the use of computerised Geographic Information Systems (GIS) and investment required in training and research and development.

Chorley was a member of the Top Salaries Review Body from 1981 to 1991, of the Ordnance Survey Advisory Board from 1982 to 1985, and of the Natural Environment Research Council 1988 to 1994. Between 1987 and 1990, he was President of the Royal Geographical Society. He was a member of The Integrated Sciences Advisory Panel.

He was one of the ninety elected hereditary peers to remain in the House of Lords after the House of Lords Act 1999. Being the runner-up in the 1999 election, he replaced the 7th Earl of Carnarvon, after the latter's death in 2001, sitting as a crossbencher. He resigned from the House under the House of Lords Reform Act 2014 on 17 November 2014.

== Mountaineering ==
Chorley's parents were both enthusiastic climbers. His father was a president of the Fell & Rock Climbing Club (1935–1937) and became vice president of the Alpine Club (UK) (1957–1958). His mother was vice president of the Fell & Rock Climbing Club in 1953 and became president of the Ladies' Alpine Club (1953–1955).

Chorley inherited their enthusiasm for mountaineering and the environment. He joined the Cambridge University Mountaineering Club when he became a student and later became the club's president (1952–1953). He was a member of the management committee of the Mount Everest Foundation (1968–1970), president of the Alpine Club (1983–1985), and patron of the British Mountaineering Council.

In 1954 he was part of a Cambridge University team, led by Alfred Tissières, which attempted to ascend Rakaposhi (7,788 metres (25,551 ft)), which at that time had never been climbed. The party included George Band, who was a member of the team that made the first ascent of Everest, and Major General Mian Hayaud Din, the Chief of General Staff of the Pakistan Army.

He went to Nepal in 1957 as part of a British team to attempt Machapuchare, which was also unclimbed. Wilfrid Noyce and A. D. M. Cox climbed to within 150 ft (46 m) of the summit. Adhering to their word of honor given to the then King Mahendra, they descended without stepping onto the summit. However, early in the expedition Chorley contracted polio and, with the assistance of Lieutenant Colonel Jimmy Roberts, the expedition leader, he left the expedition to seek medical assistance.

He was a founding member of the Mountain Heritage Trust and he donated his library of mountaineering materials to the Trust in 2013.

== Family ==
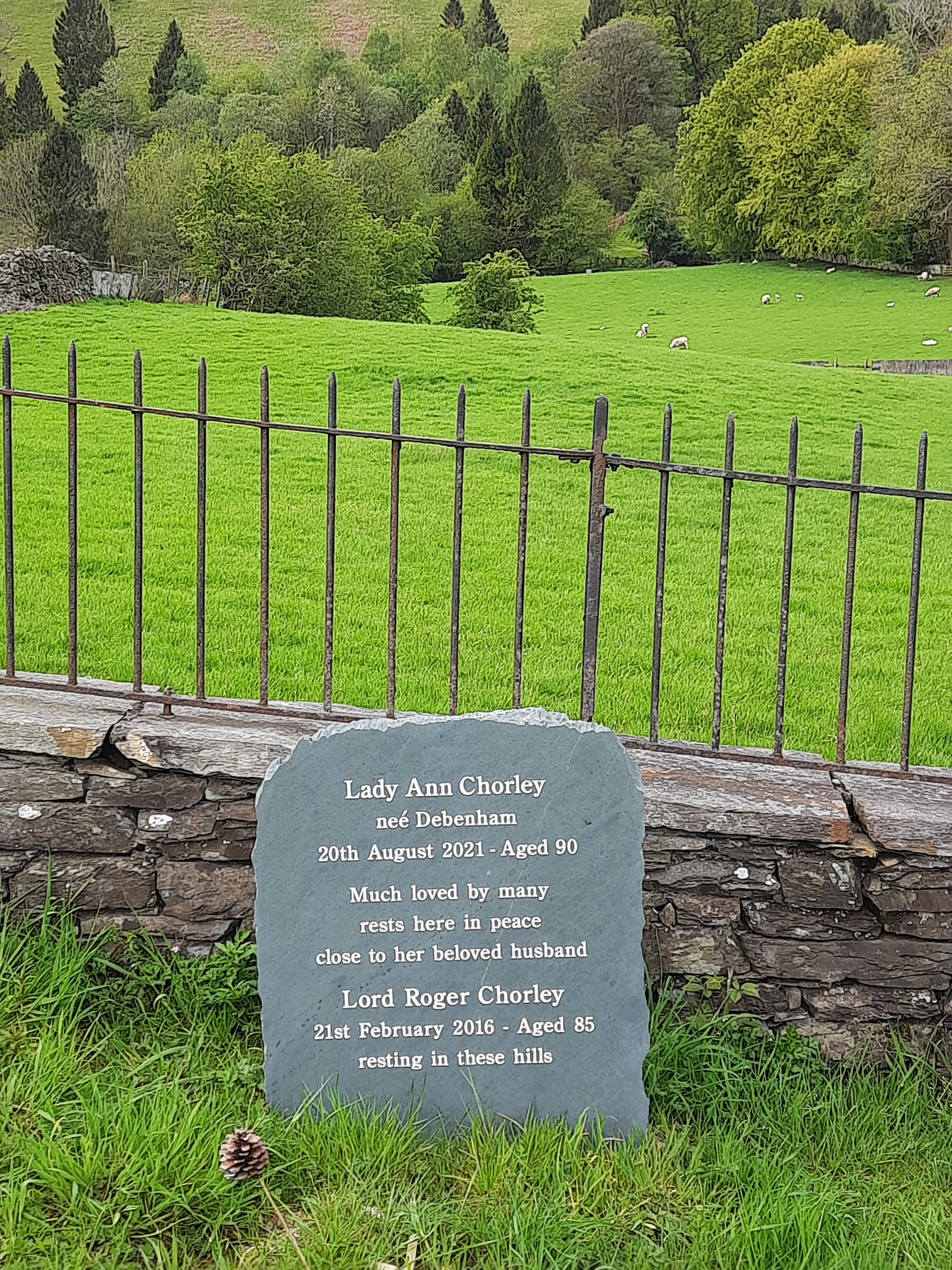
Gravestone at Hawkshead Parish Church

He married Ann Elizabeth Debenham in 1964 and they had two sons. He died on 21 February 2016 at the age of 85, and she died on 20 August 2021 at the age of 90. She is buried at St Michael and All Angels Church, Hawkshead, Cumbria, with a gravestone in the churchyard which marks their lives.

== Arms ==
Coat of arms of Roger Chorley, 2nd Baron Chorley
| Crest In front of two torches in saltire Or and inflamed a teazle stalked and leaved Proper. Escutcheon Per chevron Argent and Vert in chief two bluebottles Proper and in base a fountain. Supporters On either side a buzzard Proper. Motto Propositi Tenax (Tenacious of Purpose) |

Peerage of the United Kingdom
| Preceded by Robert Chorley | Baron Chorley; 1978–2016; Member of the House of Lords (1978–1999) | Succeeded by Nicholas Chorley |
Parliament of the United Kingdom
| Preceded by The Earl of Carnarvon | Elected hereditary peer to the House of Lords under the House of Lords Act 1999; 2001–2014 | Succeeded by The Lord Thurlow |
