= John Hopkinson =

British physicist and electrical engineer (1849–1898)

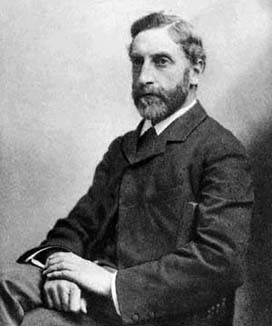
- Born: 27 July 1849; Manchester, England
- Died: 27 August 1898 (aged 49); Val d'Herens, Switzerland
- Known for: Hopkinson effect Hopkinson's law Hopkinson's test Three-phase electric power
- Children: Bertram Hopkinson (son)
- Relatives: Alfred Hopkinson (brother) Edward Hopkinson (brother) Katharine Chorley (niece); Austin Hopkinson (nephew); John Hopkinson (nephew); James Alfred Ewing (son-in-law)
- Awards: Royal Medal (1890)
- Scientific career
- Fields: physics, electrical engineering

John Hopkinson, FRS, (27 July 1849 – 27 August 1898) was a British physicist, electrical engineer, Fellow of the Royal Society and President of the IEE (now the IET) twice in 1890 and 1896. He invented the three-wire (three-phase) system for the distribution of electrical power, for which he was granted a patent in 1882. He also worked in many areas of electromagnetism and electrostatics, and in 1890 was appointed professor of electrical engineering at King's College London, where he was also director of the Siemens Laboratory.

Hopkinson's law, the magnetic counterpart to Ohm's law, is named after him.

== Life and career ==
John Hopkinson was born in Manchester, the eldest of 5 children. His father, also called John, was a mechanical engineer. He was educated at Queenwood School in Hampshire and Owens College in Manchester. He won a scholarship to Trinity College, Cambridge in 1867 and graduated in 1871 as Senior Wrangler, having placed first in the demanding Cambridge Mathematical Tripos examination. During this time, he also studied for and passed the examination for a BSc from the University of London. Hopkinson could have followed a purely academic career but instead chose engineering as his vocation. He was a Cambridge Apostle.

After working first in his father's engineering works, Hopkinson took a position in 1872 as an engineering manager in the lighthouse engineering department of Chance Brothers and Company in Smethwick. In 1877 Hopkinson was elected a Fellow of the Royal Society in recognition of his application of Maxwell's theory of electromagnetism to problems of electrostatic capacity and residual charge. In 1878 he moved to London to work as a consulting engineer, focusing particularly on developing his ideas about how to improve the design and efficiency of dynamos. Hopkinson's most important contribution was his three-wire distribution system, patented in 1882. In 1883 Hopkinson showed mathematically that it was possible to connect two alternating current dynamos in parallel-—a problem that had long bedevilled electrical engineers. He also studied magnetic permeability at high temperature, and discovered what was later called the Hopkinson peak effect.

The series-parallel method of electric motor control, for which Hopkinson was granted a British patent in 1881, would prove to be an important advance in the development of electric railways. He applied for a US patent in 1892, triggering an interference proceeding against American inventor Rudolph M Hunter, who had been granted a US patent for the method in 1888. The US Patent Office affirmed Hopkinson's claim to priority of invention, but his British patent expired before the case was resolved, rendering him ineligible for a US patent (his US patent, had one been issued, would have expired concurrently with his British patent).

Hopkinson twice held the office of President of the Institution of Electrical Engineers. During his second term, Hopkinson proposed that the Institution should make available the technical knowledge of electrical engineers for the defence of the country. In 1897, the Volunteer Corps of Electrical Engineers was formed and Hopkinson became major in command of the corps.

== Personal life and legacy ==
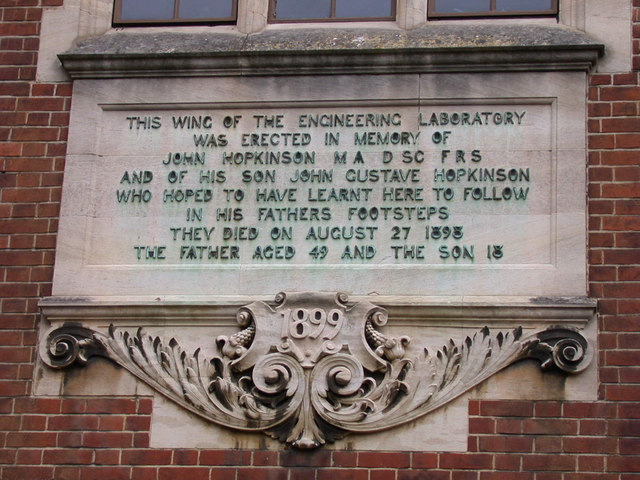
Memorial plaque at Cambridge

Hopkinson was a member of the Alpine Club from 1889 until his death but he had been an active mountaineer in the alps for some years before that. He had made a number of significant alpine ascents with his brothers, Charles and Edward, his son Bertram and daughter Alice had joined him on some of those ascents. His climbing included some first ascents and new routes undertaken without guides, a summary of his alpine activities is given in Mumm's Alpine Register.

On 27 August 1898, Hopkinson and three of his six children, John Gustave, Alice and Lina Evelyn, were killed in a mountaineering accident on the Petite Dent de Veisivi, Val d'Hérens, in the Pennine Alps, Switzerland.

As a memorial to John Hopkinson and his son, the 1899 extension to the Engineering Laboratory at the New Museums Site as part of the University of Cambridge was named after him. A plaque commemorating this adorns the upper part of the wall in Free School Lane. The Hopkinson Professorship of Applied Thermodynamics (latterly and currently the Hopkinson and Imperial Chemical Industries Professorship of Applied Thermodynamics) was created in his memory.

There is a sundial in the gardens of Newnham College, Cambridge memorialising Alice Hopkinson, from where she had recently graduated; the Lina Evelyn Hopkinson Scholarship is awarded to pupils at Wimbledon High School for excellence in English Literature.

At the Victoria University of Manchester (now part of University of Manchester Institute of Science and Technology, which is now amalgamated with the University of Manchester) the Electro-technical Laboratory (1912) in Coupland Street, Manchester was named after him.

His wife Evelyn (née Oldenburg), his two sons Bertram and Cecil (christened Rudolf), and his daughter Ellen (married James Alfred Ewing in 1912) are buried in the Ascension Parish Burial Ground, Cambridge; the rest of the family are buried at Cimetière de Territet (part of St John's English Church) at Territet, a municipality south of Montreux, Switzerland. Cecil (1891-1917) shared rooms with Lawrence Bragg whilst they were both studying at Trinity College, Cambridge and they became firm friends, he incurred a severe head wound in the 1914-19 war and died a few months after being invalided back to the UK. Bragg subsequently married Cecil's cousin Alice Hopkinson.

== See also ==
- Electric motor
- Three-phase electric power
- Polyphase system
- Rigid collectors
