= Arthur Edgar Jalland =

British politician

Arthur Edgar Jalland JP (1889 – 21 January 1958) was a British QC, judge and Liberal Party politician.

== Background ==
He was the fourth son of William Henry and Mary S. Jalland. He was educated at Manchester Grammar School and Manchester University. He married, in 1914, Elizabeth Hewitt Wainwright. They had one son, William, and one daughter, Marjorie.

== Professional career ==
He obtained an LLB from Gray's Inn in 1910. He was called to the bar in 1911. He served in the First World War with HM Forces 1915–19. He was a Lieutenant RGA (SR). He was appointed a King's Counsel in 1950. He was Chairman of the Lancashire County Quarter Sessions from 1950 to 1958. He was Recorder of Preston and Judge of Preston Borough Court of Pleas from 1950 to 1958. He was Justice of the Peace in Lancashire County and Preston Borough 1950-58.

== Political career ==
He was a member of the executive of the Lancashire, Cheshire and North-Western Liberal Federation. He was the Liberal candidate for the Knutsford Division of Cheshire at the 1929 general election. The Liberals came to within 80 votes of winning Knutsford in 1923. The Liberals experienced a mini-revival and there was a swing to the Liberals in Knutsford of 7%. However, he was unable to unseat his Unionist opponent.

General election 1929: Knutsford Electorate 52,479
| Party | Candidate | Votes | % | ±% |
|---|---|---|---|---|
| Unionist | Ernest Makins | 22,605 | 53.5 | −7.0 |
| Liberal | Arthur Edgar Jalland | 19,629 | 46.5 | +7.0 |
| Majority | | 2,976 | 7.0 | −14.0 |
| Turnout | | | 80.5 | |
| Unionist hold | | Swing | -7.0 | |

In October 1931 he was re-adopted as Liberal candidate for Knutsford to contest the 1931 General Election called by the recently formed National Government. However, his nomination did not go forward and his Conservative opponent was returned unopposed. He continued as the Liberal prospective candidate for Knutsford into 1933 before he stood down. Although he did not stand for parliament again, he continued to support the Liberal party. After the Second World War, he was still active as Honorary Secretary of the Lancashire, Cheshire and North-Western Liberal Federation.

== Marjorie Wainwright Jalland ==
His daughter Marjorie was also active in politics with the Liberal Party. In the late 1930s, she was a regular speaker at Liberal Party events in the Lancashire area. She was adopted as Liberal candidate for the Lancashire division of Mossley. She contested the 1945 general election and came third ahead of the incumbent Member of Parliament;

General election 1945: Mossley Electorate 75,697
| Party | Candidate | Votes | % | ±% |
|---|---|---|---|---|
| Labour | Rev. George Saville Woods | 27,435 | 47.5 | −0.2 |
| Conservative | Capt. G.E. Rush | 18,452 | 32.0 | n/a |
| Liberal | Marjorie Wainwright Jalland | 7,128 | 12.4 | n/a |
| Independent | Austin Hopkinson | 4,671 | 8.1 | −44.2 |
| Majority | | 8,983 | 15.5 | |
| Turnout | | 54,669 | 76.2 | |
| Labour gain from Independent | | Swing | | |
