= Robert Chorley, 1st Baron Chorley =

British legal scholar, public servant and Labour politician

The Right Honourable The Lord Chorley QC
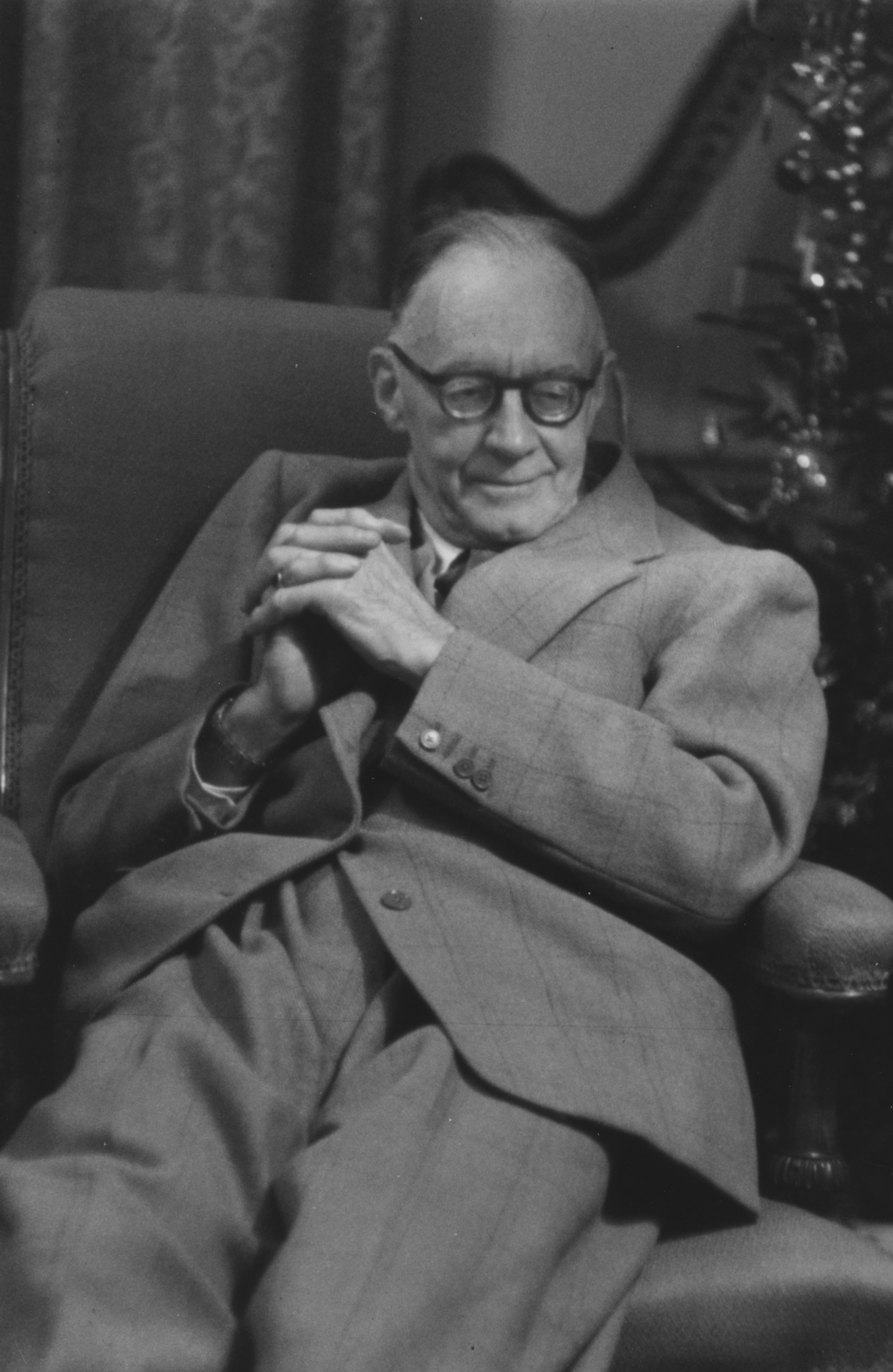

Lord-in-waiting Government Whip
- In office 11 October 1946 – 31 March 1950
- Monarch: George VI
- Prime Minister: Clement Attlee
- Preceded by: The Lord Pakenham
- Succeeded by: The Lord Burden

Member of the House of Lords Lord Temporal
- In office 16 November 1945 – 27 January 1978; Hereditary peerage
- Preceded by: Peerage created
- Succeeded by: Roger Chorley, 2nd Baron Chorley

Personal details
- Born: 29 May 1895
- Died: 27 January 1978 (aged 82)
- Party: Labour
- Spouse: Katharine Chorley (née Hopkinson)
- Education: Kendal Grammar School; Queen's College, Oxford

Robert Samuel Theodore Chorley, 1st Baron Chorley QC (29 May 1895 – 27 January 1978), was a British legal scholar, public servant and Labour politician.

Chorley was the son of Richard Fisher Chorley of Kendal, Westmorland, and his wife Annie Elizabeth (née Frost). He was educated at Kendal Grammar School and Queen's College, Oxford, and served in the Foreign Office and Ministry of Labour during the First World War. He was called to the Bar, Inner Temple, in 1920, and was a Tutor at the Law Society's School of Law from 1920 to 1924, a lecturer in Commercial Law from 1924 to 1930, Sir Ernest Cassel Professor of Commercial and Industrial Law at the University of London from 1930 to 1946 and Dean of the Faculty of Law at the University of London from 1939 to 1942. During the Second World War Chorley served as a Principal at the Home Office between 1940 and 1941, as Assistant-Secretary to the Minister of Home Security from 1941 to 1942 and as Deputy Regional Commissioner for the Civil Defence (North-West Region) from 1942 to 1944.

He stood unsuccessfully as a Labour candidate for Northwich in July 1945, but on 16 November of that year he was raised to the peerage as Baron Chorley, of Kendal in the County of Westmorland. He then served under Clement Attlee as a Lord-in-waiting (government whip) in the House of Lords between 1945 and 1950.

He was active in the Association of University Teachers, serving as president in 1947–1948 and as honorary general secretary from 1953 to 1965.

Lord Chorley married Katharine, daughter of Edward Hopkinson, in 1925. She would later contribute to C. E. M. Joad's 1948 work The English Counties Illustrated, by writing the chapters on Westmorland and Cumberland. They had two sons and a daughter. He died in January 1978, aged 82, and was succeeded in the barony by his eldest son Roger. Lady Chorley died in 1986.

In 1951, Chorley was appointed President of the Ethical Union (now Humanists UK), succeeding science writer Sir Richard Gregory and succeeded by sociologist Morris Ginsberg.

== Arms ==
Coat of arms of Robert Chorley, 1st Baron Chorley
Crest In front of two torches in saltire Or and inflamed a teazle stalked and leaved Proper. Escutcheon Per chevron Argent and Vert in chief two bluebottles Proper and in base a fountain. Supporters On either side a buzzard Proper. Motto Propositi Tenax (Tenacious of Purpose)

Peerage of the United Kingdom
New creation	Baron Chorley; 1945–1978	Succeeded by Roger Chorley
