= Mossley (constituency) =

Parliamentary constituency in the United Kingdom, 1918–1950

- Former county constituency for the House of Commons
- County: Lancashire (now Greater Manchester)

1918–1950
- Seats: One
- Created from: Gorton; Prestwich
- Replaced by: Droylsden; Ashton-under-Lyne

Mossley was a parliamentary constituency which returned one Member of Parliament (MP) to the House of Commons of the United Kingdom Parliament.

It was created at the 1918 general election as a county division of Lancashire, taking areas formerly in the Gorton and Prestwich constituencies. The area consisted of small towns which were increasingly suburban to Manchester, such as Droylsden and Failsworth (now part of Oldham borough), together with some towns then further out such as Denton, and stretching out to the edge of Saddleworth Moor to take in Mossley.

This created a mixed area which declined in social status during its existence as Manchester expanded to the east and its industrial area expanded. The electorate also increased over time, and in a boundary change in 1950 the seat was divided with the areas adjacent to Manchester forming the new Droylsden constituency while the remainder including Mossley itself formed part of Ashton-under-Lyne.

== Boundaries ==
The Borough of Mossley, the Rural District of Limehurst, and the Urban Districts of Audenshaw, Denton, Droylsden, Failsworth, and Lees.

== Members of Parliament ==
Election	Member	Party
1918	Austin Hopkinson	Coalition Liberal
Jan 1922	Austin Hopkinson	Independent
1929	Herbert Gibson	Labour
1931	Austin Hopkinson	National Independent
1945	George Woods	Labour Co-op
1950	constituency abolished	

== Election results ==
=== 1910s election results ===
General election 1918: Mossley
Party		Candidate	Votes	%
C	National Liberal	Austin Hopkinson*	16,158	75.6
	Co-operative Party	William Brown	5,227	24.4
Majority			10,931	51.2
Turnout			21,385	52.8
	National Liberal win (new seat)			
C indicates candidate endorsed by the coalition government.

* Hopkinson was not a member of any political party but was adopted by both the local Conservative and Liberal Associations, received the Coalition Coupon and saw himself as a Liberal. However, he said this did not bind him to support the coalition government or to vote with it, and that he had accepted the coupon for the good of the country.

=== 1920s election results ===
General election 1922: Mossley
Party	Candidate	Votes	%	±%
Independent	Austin Hopkinson	15,953	58.4	−17.2
Liberal	Miles Ewart Mitchell	11,376	41.6	New
Majority		4,577	16.8	−34.4
Turnout		27,329	67.5	+14.7
Independent hold		Swing		

General election 1923: Mossley
Party	Candidate	Votes	%	±%
Independent	Austin Hopkinson	11,426	50.8	−7.6
Liberal	George Jennison	11,051	49.2	+7.6
Majority		375	1.6	−15.2
Turnout		22,477	54.5	−13.0
Independent hold		Swing	-7.6	

General election 1924: Mossley
Party	Candidate	Votes	%	±%
Independent	Austin Hopkinson	15,435	49.2	−1.6
Labour Co-op	Thomas Mercer	10,769	34.3	New
Liberal	George Jennison	5,162	16.5	−32.7
Majority		4,666	14.9	+13.3
Turnout		31,366	75.3	+20.8
Independent hold		Swing		

General election 1929: Mossley
Party	Candidate	Votes	%	±%
Labour Co-op	Herbert Gibson	19,296	46.0	+11.7
Independent	Austin Hopkinson	14,267	33.9	−15.3
Liberal	Harold Housley	8,467	20.1	+3.6
Majority		5,029	12.1	N/A
Turnout		42,030	76.8	+1.5
Labour Co-op gain from Independent		Swing	+13.5	

=== 1930s election results ===
General election 1931: Mossley
Party	Candidate	Votes	%	±%
National Independent	Austin Hopkinson	17,017	36.7	+2.8
Labour Co-op	Herbert Gibson	15,587	33.5	−12.5
Conservative	Ernest Barlow	13,873	29.8	New
Majority		1,430	3.2	N/A
Turnout		46,477	84.2	+7.4
National gain from Labour Co-op		Swing	+7.6	

General election 1935: Mossley
Party	Candidate	Votes	%	±%
National Independent	Austin Hopkinson	24,569	52.3	+15.6
Labour Co-op	Herbert Gibson	22,399	47.7	+14.2
Majority		2,170	4.6	+1.4
Turnout		46,968	75.3	−8.9
National Independent hold		Swing	+0.7	

=== 1940s election results ===
General election 1945: Mossley
Party	Candidate	Votes	%	±%
Labour Co-op	George Woods	27,435	47.5	−0.2
Conservative	G.E. Rush	18,452	32.0	New
Liberal	Marjorie Jalland	7,128	12.4	New
National Independent	Austin Hopkinson	4,671	8.1	−44.2
Majority		8,983	15.5	N/A
Turnout		54,669	76.2	+0.9
Labour Co-op gain from National		Swing	+22.0	
