= 1926 Combined English Universities by-election =

UK parliamentary by-election

The 1926 Combined English Universities by-election was held on 8–12 March 1926. The by-election was held due to the resignation of the incumbent Liberal MP, H. A. L. Fisher. It was won by the Conservative candidate Alfred Hopkinson.

By-Election 8–12 March 1926: Combined English Universities
| Party | Candidate | Votes | % | ±% |
|---|---|---|---|---|
| Conservative | Alfred Hopkinson | 2,343 | 53.9 | +3.5 |
| Liberal | Ramsay Muir | 2,000 | 46.1 | +16.0 |
| Majority | | 343 | 7.8 | N/A |
| Turnout | | 4,343 | 66.7 | −11.5 |
| Registered electors | | 6,513 | | |
| Conservative gain from Liberal | | Swing | | |
