= William Henry Wahl =

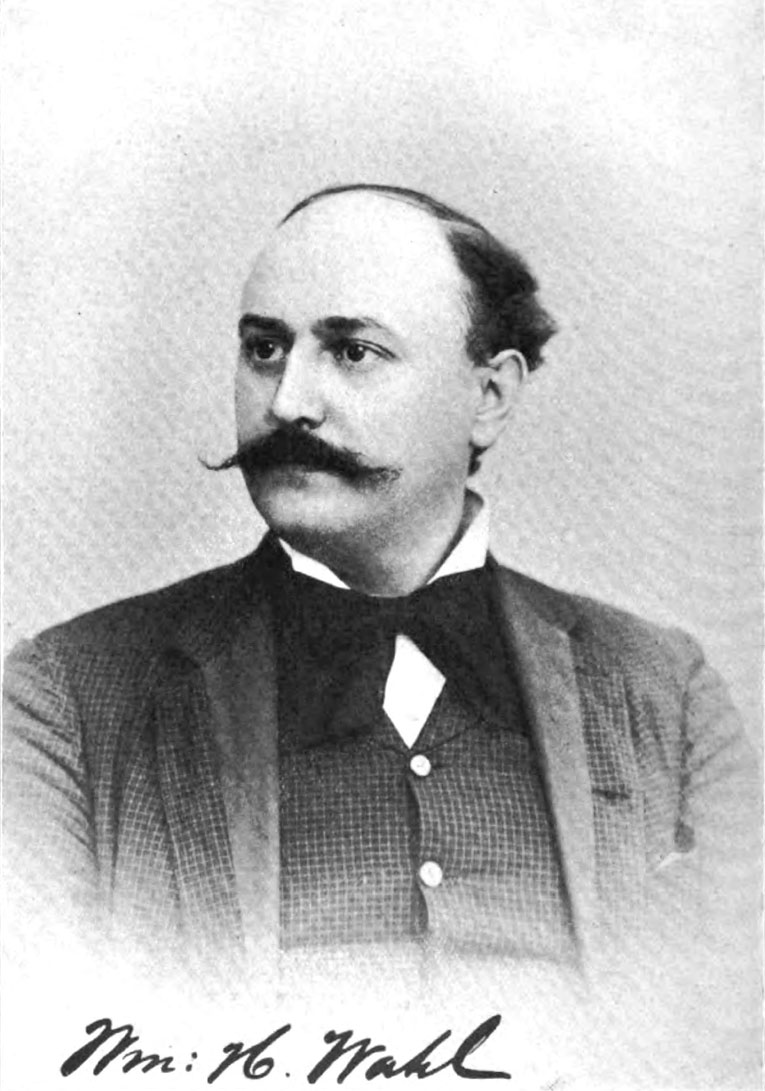
- Born: December 14, 1848; Philadelphia, U.S.
- Died: March 23, 1909 (aged 60)

William Henry Wahl (December 14, 1848 – March 23, 1909) was a American scientific editor and journalist.

== Biography ==
Wahl entered Dickinson College, Carlisle, Pennsylvania, in 1863 at the age of 15, and graduated from there in 1867. He then studied at the University of Heidelberg, from where he received his Ph.D. in 1869. He subsequently made a special study of mineralogy, geology and chemistry. During a trip home from Heidelberg, he made the acquaintance of Henry Morton, resident secretary of the Franklin Institute, who had engaged him for editorial services. Morton obtained from Wahl a series of articles on crystallography for the Journal of the Institute. When Morton left the service of the Institute in 1870, he recommended Wahl as a competent replacement, and this advice was taken. Wahl was resident secretary at the Institute and editor of its Journal 1870–74.

Wahl was instructor in physical sciences at the Philadelphia Episcopal Academy from 1871 to 1873, and then professor of physics and physical geography at the Central High School at Philadelphia from 1873 to 1874. In 1874, he was elected as a member to the American Philosophical Society. From 1873 to 1876, he was editor of the Department of Arts, Sciences and Patents of the American Exchange and Review. His abilities as a scientific journalist became recognized, and from 1876 to 1879 he was editor of the Philadelphia Polytechnic Review, then associate editor of the Engineering and Mining Journal of New York from 1878 to 1881, then an editor of the New York Manufacturer and Builder from 1880 to 1896. He resumed his former post at the Franklin Institute in 1882. During his tenure at the Franklin Institute, he built the Journal up from a reprinter of scientific information to an original source.

Among the various services rendered to the Institute by Wahl apart from his immediate function as its secretary was his organization of the several individual sections of the Institute in the various branches of the applied sciences. Under his fostering influence these sections became a principal feature of the institute's activity. Their proceedings largely supplemented those of the Institute in general and enriched the Journal with many records of original scientific research.

In 1893 he described his own investigations and development, in collaboration, of two important metallurgical processes, one for the reduction of refractory metallic oxides by means of aluminum and the other for the reduction of such oxides by means of silicon. The descriptions appeared in two articles, “A new method for the Preparation of Metallic Manganese” and “Preparation of Metallic Alloys,” printed in the Journal of the Franklin Institute. These published investigations anticipated by several years the subsequent commercial development of the art, and were increasingly utilized in the steel making industry where low carbon ferro alloys were required. Wahl's process of reducing metallic oxides was similar in principle to a method of reduction which later came largely into practical use, in which the oxide is mixed with powdered or granulated aluminum and ignited in a cold crucible, resulting in the reduction of the oxide and the production of a very high temperature for purposes of welding.

Wahl's resignation as secretary at the Franklin Institute was accepted on 13 January 1909, shortly before his death. He provided that his entire estate (estimated at $75,000) be held in trust for use and benefit of his widow during her life, and that thereafter it be held for the use and benefit of the Franklin Institute, as a memorial to his father, John H. Wahl, provided that within three years after its reversion, an equal sum be contributed from other sources, not including bequests.

== Works ==
- Galvano-plastic Manipulations (1883)
- Techno-Chemical Receipt Book, a collaborative effort (1885)
- Hand-Book of Assaying, translation from German with additions
- Preparations of Metallic Alloys (1893)
- Historical Sketch of the Franklin Institute (1894)
