= Hopkins =

Origin
- Region of origin: British Isles

Other names
- Related names: Hopkinson, Popkin

Hopkins is an English and Welsh patronymic surname derived from the personal name Hopkin and the genitive ending -s. Hopkin is itself a pet form of the name Hobb, a shortening of Robert (with alteration of the initial consonant). Notable people and characters with the surname include:

- Anna Hopkins (born 1987), Canadian actress
- Andrew Delmar Hopkins (1857–1948), American entomologist
- Sir Anthony Hopkins (born 1937), actor
- Antony Hopkins, composer
- A. G. Hopkins (Antony Gerald Hopkins), British historian
- Arthur Hopkins (disambiguation), several people
- Bernard Hopkins, professional boxer
- Bert Hopkins, Australian cricketer
- Bobb Hopkins, actor, director and founder of the National Hobo Association
- Brad Hopkins, NFL offensive lineman
- Brycen Hopkins (born 1997), American football player & son of Brad
- Budd Hopkins, artist and UFO researcher
- Cathy Hopkins, novelist
- Catrin Hopkins (born 1997), Welsh singer known as Catty
- Charles Hopkins (disambiguation), several people
- Christian Hopkins, American football player
- Claude Hopkins, musician
- Claude C. Hopkins, advertising man
- Constance Hopkins, Mayflower passenger
- C. J. Hopkins, American playwright and author
- Daeden Hopkins (born 2007), American football player
- DeAndre Hopkins (born 1992), American football player
- Dustin Hopkins, American football player
- Edward Hopkins (disambiguation), several people
- Edward John Hopkins, English organist and composer
- Elizabeth Hopkins (1731–1801), English actress
- Esek Hopkins (1718–1802), Continental Navy officer
- Esther A. Hopkins, American chemist and environmental attorney
- Ezekiel Hopkins, Bishop of Derry and Raphoe
- Frank Hopkins, U.S. cowboy
- Frank Hopkins (Royal Navy officer), Captain of HMS Ark Royal
- Frederick Gowland Hopkins, biochemist, Nobel Prize laureate
- Gail Hopkins (born 1943), American baseball player and coach
- Gareth Hopkins, New Zealand cricketer
- Gareth Hopkins (footballer), English footballer
- Gaynor Hopkins, stage name Bonnie Tyler (1951–2026), Welsh singer
- George Hopkins (disambiguation), several people
- Gerard Manley Hopkins, poet, Jesuit
- Graham Hopkins, drummer/musician
- Harold Hopkins (physicist), physicist
- Harry Hopkins, economics advisor to Franklin D. Roosevelt
- Harry Hopkins (engineer) (1912–1986), New Zealand civil engineer and professor
- Herbert Hopkins, Australian/English cricketer
- Ian Hopkins, British police chief
- Isaac S. Hopkins, professor/founder Georgia Institute of Technology
- J. Fletcher Hopkins (died 1953), American politician
- James Hopkins (disambiguation), several people
- Jeff Hopkins, footballer
- Jeffrey Hopkins, Tibetologist
- John Hopkins (disambiguation), several people
- Johns Hopkins, philanthropist
- Jon Hopkins, electronica musician
- Juliet Opie Hopkins (1818–1890), American nurse
- Katie Hopkins, British TV personality and newspaper columnist
- Keith Hopkins, historian and sociologist
- Larry J. Hopkins (1933–2021), American politician
- Lea Hopkins (born 1944), American LGBT rights activist from Missouri
- Lemuel Hopkins (1750–1801), American poet
- Lightnin' Hopkins, blues guitarist and singer
- Linda Ann Hopkins (born 1976) known as Tera Patrick, pornographic actress
- Lisa Hopkins (born 1978), American opera singer
- Livingston Hopkins "Hop" (1846–1927), American-born cartoonist in Australia
- Mark Hopkins (disambiguation), several people
- Mary Hopkins (disambiguation), several people
- Matthew Hopkins, 17th century witch-hunter
- Maudie Hopkins (1914–2008), last surviving American Civil War widow
- Mel Hopkins (1934–2010), Welsh international footballer
- Michael Hopkins (disambiguation), several people
- Milton Hopkins (biologist) (1906–1983), American botanist and textbook editor
- Milton N. Hopkins (1926–2007), farmer and ornithologist
- Milton W. Hopkins (1789–1844), American portrait painter
- Miriam Hopkins (1902–1972), American actress
- Nathan T. Hopkins, U.S. Representative from Kentucky
- Neil Hopkins (born 1977), American actor
- Nelson K. Hopkins, New York State Comptroller, 1872–1875
- Nicky Hopkins (1944–1994), English rock pianist
- Nikita Hopkins (born 1993), American actor
- Patty Hopkins (born 1942), British architect
- Paul Hopkins (baseball) (1904–2004), American baseball pitcher
- Paul Hopkins (actor) (born 1968), Canadian television, film and theatre actor
- Paul Hopkins (footballer) (born 1986), English (soccer) footballer
- Peter Hopkins, multiple people
- Prynce Hopkins (1885–1970), American psychologist, activist, and writer
- Rachel Hopkins, British Member of Parliament elected 2019
- Raymond F. Hopkins (born 1939), American political science professor and expert on food politics and food policy
- Richard Hopkins (disambiguation), several people
- Rob Hopkins (born 1968), English activist founder of Transition Towns movement
- Ron Hopkins (born 1960), American football player
- Roy M. Hopkins (1943–2006), member of the Louisiana House of Representatives
- Stephen Hopkins (disambiguation), several people
- Telma Hopkins, American singer and actress
- Thelma Hopkins (athlete) (1936–2025), Northern Irish athlete
- Tim Hopkins, jazz musician
- Tom Hopkins (footballer), English footballer
- Wes Hopkins, NFL defensive back
- William Hopkins (disambiguation), several people

== Fictional characters ==
- Jimmy Hopkins, main character of the controversial video game Bully
- Kailey Hopkins, American Girl character, "Girl of the Year" for 2003
- Gilly Hopkins, main character of The Great Gilly Hopkins
- Martin Hopkins, main character of the Pentagram series by Anthony Horowitz

== See also ==
- Hopkin
- Hopkinson
