= Hopkinson =

Hopkinson is a surname of English and Welsh origin. Notable people with the surname include:

- Abdur Rahman Slade Hopkinson (1934–1993), West Indian writer
- Alfred Hopkinson (1851–1939), British politician
- Alister Hopkinson (1941–99), New Zealand rugby union player
- Amanda Hopkinson (born 1948), British scholar and literary translator
- Austin Hopkinson (1879–1962), British politician
- Barney Hopkinson (born before 1965), British Anglican priest
- Bertram Hopkinson (1874–1918), British engineer
  - Split-Hopkinson pressure bar, an apparatus for testing the dynamic stress-strain response of materials, named after Bertram Hopkinson
- Bobby Hopkinson (born 1990), English footballer
- Carl Hopkinson (born 1981), English cricketer
- Charles Hopkinson (1869–1962), American artist
- Deborah Hopkinson (born before 2004), American writer of children's books
- Eddie Hopkinson (1935–2004), English football goalkeeper
- Edward Hopkinson (1859–1922), British politician and engineer
- Emilius Hopkinson (1869–1951), British medical doctor, ornithologist and writer
- Francis Hopkinson (1737–91), American writer and signer of the Declaration of Independence
  - Francis Hopkinson House, a historic home in Bordentown, Burlington County, New Jersey, onetime residence of Francis Hopkinson
- Fred Hopkinson (1908–after 1935), English footballer
- Frederick Hopkinson (1922–2004), British sports shooter who competed in the 1956 Summer Olympics
- George F. Hopkinson (1895–1943), British general
- Gerald Hopkinson (before 1930–after 1952), British general
- Gordon Hopkinson (born 1933), English footballer
- Greta Hopkinson (1901–93), British wood sculptor
- Harry Hopkinson (1902–79), English yodeler
- Henry Hopkinson, 1st Baron Colyton (1902–96), British diplomat and politician
- Hopkinson (MCC cricketer) (fl. 1817), English cricketer
- Ian Hopkinson (born 1950), English footballer
- John Hopkinson (1849–98), British physicist
  - Hopkinson and Imperial Chemical Industries Professor of Applied Thermodynamics, University of Cambridge, named after John Hopkinson
  - Hopkinson's law, the magnetic analogy to Ohm's law, named after John Hopkinson
- John Hopkinson (priest) (before 1904–1957), British Anglican priest
- Joseph Hopkinson (1770–1842), U.S. Representative from Pennsylvania, later a federal judge
- Mark Hopkinson (1949–92), American proxy murderer
- Mick Hopkinson (born 1942), English footballer
- Nalo Hopkinson (born 1960), Jamaican writer
- Peter Hopkinson (1920–2007), British film-maker and director
- Rusty Hopkinson (active from 1990s), Australian drummer
- Samuel Hopkinson (cricketer) (1825–87), Australian cricketer
- Samuel Hopkinson (footballer) (1903–58), English footballer
- Simon Hopkinson (born 1954), British chef and cookery writer
- Thomas Hopkinson (1709–51), American lawyer and public official
- Tom Hopkinson (1905–90), British journalist, picture magazine editor, author, and teacher
- W. C. Hopkinson (1880–1914), British intelligence agent
- William John Hopkinson (1887–1970), Canadian artist

Given name

- Francis Hopkinson Smith (1838–1915), American author, artist and engineer
- Hopkinson Smith (born 1946), American lutenist
- William Hopkinson Cox (1856–1950), American politician in Kentucky

== See also ==
- Ambrose Hopkinson House, a historic house located in Olney, Illinois
- Francis Hopkinson School, a historic school building located in the Juniata neighborhood of Philadelphia, Pennsylvania
- George Hopkinson House, a historic house located in Groveland, Massachusetts
- Grace Hopkinson Eliot Hall, a historic dormitory building on the Radcliffe Quadrangle of Harvard University
- Hopkinson Gold Medal, awarded for piano performance by the Royal College of Music
- Hopkinson v Police, a New Zealand court case relating to burning of the national flag
- Hopkinsons, an Australian bus company in Western Sydney
- Hopkin
- Hopkins (disambiguation)
