= James Hopkins =

James Hopkins may refer to:

== Politicians ==
- James G. Hopkins (1801–1860), New York politician
- James C. Hopkins (lawyer) (1819–1877), legislator, lawyer, and judge of New York and Wisconsin
- James Herron Hopkins (1832–1904), American politician
- James Scott-Hopkins (1921–1995), British Conservative Party politician

== Other ==
- James Frank Hopkins (1845–1913), Confederate Army volunteer and founder of the Sigma Nu fraternity at the VMI
- James Hopkins (footballer, born 1873) (1873–?), English association football player for Manchester United
- James Hopkins (footballer, born 1901) (1901–1943), Northern Irish association football player for Arsenal and Brighton
- James C. Hopkins (architect) (1873–1938), Massachusetts architect, partner in Kilham & Hopkins
- James C. Hopkins, Jr. (architect) (c. 1914–1998), his son, also architectural firm partner
- James I. Hopkins Jr. (1918–1951), American lieutenant colonel
- Jim Hopkins (born 1946), New Zealand TV personality
- Jimmy Hopkins, fictional character in the video game Bully
