= William Hopkinson =

William Hopkinson may refer to:

- William Hopkinson (cricketer), English cricketer
- William C. Hopkinson, Indian police officer, later an immigration inspector in Canada
- William John Hopkinson, Canadian artist
