= Hopkins (disambiguation) =

Hopkins is an English and Welsh patronymic surname.

Hopkins may also refer to:

== Places ==
=== Australia ===
- Hopkins Island, South Australia

=== Belize ===
- Hopkins, Belize

=== United States ===
- Hopkins, California was the former name of Soda Springs, Nevada County, California
- Hopkins, Michigan
- Hopkins, Minnesota
- Hopkins, Missouri
- Hopkins, South Carolina
- Hopkins County, Kentucky
- Hopkins County, Texas
- Hopkins Township, Whiteside County, Illinois
- Hopkins Township, Michigan

== Education ==
=== United States ===
- Johns Hopkins University in Baltimore, Maryland
  - Johns Hopkins Blue Jays, the school's athletic program
  - Johns Hopkins Hospital
  - Johns Hopkins School of Medicine
  - Johns Hopkins Bloomberg School of Public Health
- Hopkins School in New Haven, Connecticut
- Hopkins Academy, a public school in Hadley, Massachusetts
- Hopkins Junior High School, a public school in Fremont, California
- Hopkins Public Schools (Michigan), a school district in Michigan
- Hopkins Public Schools (Minnesota), a school district in Minnesota
  - Hopkins High School in the Hopkins Public Schools District

== Other uses ==
- Hopkins (TV series), a television documentary about doctors at Johns Hopkins Hospital
- Hopkins Architects, an international architecture practice based in London and Dubai
- Cleveland Hopkins International Airport in the U.S. state of Ohio
- Hopkins Rides Inc, an amusement ride manufacturer

== See also ==
- Justice Hopkins (disambiguation)
