= Samuel Hopkinson =

Samuel Hopkinson may refer to:

- Samuel Hopkinson (footballer)
- Samuel Hopkinson (cricketer)
