= Hopkin =

Origin
- Meaning: "son of Hob"
- Region of origin: England

Other names
- Variant forms: Hopkins, Hopkinson

Hopkin is an English language patronymic surname meaning "son of Hob", derived from the masculine given name Hob meaning "famous". There are variants including Hopkins. Hopkin is uncommon as a given name. People with the name Hopkin include:

- David Hopkin (born 1970), Scottish footballer
- Deian Hopkin (born 1944), Welsh historian and Vice-Chancellor
- Fred Hopkin (1895–1970), English footballer
- Mary Hopkin (born 1950), Welsh singer

== Given name ==
- Rhys Hopkin Morris (1888–1956), Welsh politician
