= Gerry Rosenthal =

American musician and actor

- Occupations: Musician; singer-songwriter; actor
- Years active: 1987–present
- Spouse: Megan McGrath (m. 2013)
- Children: 1
- Musical career
- Genres: Progressive rock; funk; soul; motown; disco
- Instruments: Guitar; vocals; bass; keyboard
- Member of: The Gerry Rosenthal Trio; Big Wake; Hey Bulldog; Mama Doni Band; The Jersey Joint
- Website: gerryrosenthal.com

Gerry Rosenthal is an American musician, singer-songwriter and actor. He has starred in films and short films and has guest starred in television series such as Law & Order and Celebrity Deathmatch. He is best known for providing the voice for Jimmy Hopkins, the playable character in the 2006 video game Bully, for which he was nominated for a 2006 Spike VGA Award for Best Performance by a Human Male and a 10th Annual Interactive Achievement Award for Outstanding Achievement in Character Performance - Male.

== Early life ==
Rosenthal graduated from North Plainfield High School in 1998 in North Plainfield, New Jersey, where he was active in theater programs. He attended college at Rutgers University in New Brunswick, New Jersey where he studied history and political science.

== Career ==
=== Acting ===
Rosenthal was about 6 years old when his mother took him into New York City to audition for an acting agent, which led to auditions. He acted in commercials as a child starting at the age of seven. He says that acting was something his parents essentially dragged him to do, but around the beginning of ninth grade he realized that he truly wanted to act. Rosenthal has appeared in television commercials and radio voice-overs, along with television series including Law & Order and Law & Order: Special Victims Unit, as well as the films Liberty Heights, Finding Forrester, and Wirey Spindell. Rosenthal also provided the voice for the main playable character Jimmy Hopkins in the 2006 video game Bully, from Rockstar Games. He reprised his role for new missions featured in the remastered Scholarship Edition of the game.

=== Music ===
Rosenthal's father began teaching him guitar and piano at 7 years old. Between the ages of ten and thirteen he attended the St. Thomas Choir School in New York City, a boarding school for young male choristers. He sang in five or six services a week at St. Thomas Church Fifth Avenue with the St. Thomas Choir of Men and Boys under the direction of Dr. Gerre Hancock. While at St. Thomas, Rosenthal studied piano with concert pianist Leslie Singer and music theory with composer Scott Eyerly (composer of the Opera house of Seven Gables, as well as a faculty member at The Juilliard School). He toured with the St. Thomas Choir, traveling to Austria, Italy, Vienna, and Ireland. In high school Rosenthal continued his piano studies privately with jazz pianist Paul Salamone. While earning a History degree at Rutgers University, Rosenthal attended a semester at Berklee College of Music in Boston, Massachusetts, where he studied guitar privately with John Marasco (Eartha Kitt, Al Martino) and John Thomas (Kenny Drew, Tony Scott, Roy Haynes) as well as music theory with Jim Stinnett (bass instructor for Mike Gordon of Phish) While in college he also studied guitar privately with Karl Cochran (Ace Frehley, Joe Lynn Turner.) He also played with different groups for fun in college, so within six months of moving home He was playing in about four bands in the New Brunswick, New Jersey, area. Over the years his focus gradually shifted more and more towards music, and that's how he makes his living today. He says that he still goes on acting auditions, but music is his life at this point. He is the guitarist of the music groups The Gerry Rosenthal Trio and Big Wake and is also the bassist of the music groups Hey Bulldog and The Jersey Joint.

== Personal life ==
Rosenthal grew up with two brothers, also musicians. His younger brother Hank died of a drug overdose at the age of 26 on September 30, 2017.

Rosenthal and his wife Megan McGrath became parents of their son James sometime in late 2018.

Today, Rosenthal and his family currently live in Jersey City, New Jersey. He teaches private music lessons and performs in gigs professionally. He freelances with as many different projects as possible, and performs solo and duo acoustic sets all over the area.

== Discography ==
- Big Wake (2011)
- Why We Belong - Single (2016)
- Why We Belong (2019)
- Is This the Night - Single (2019)
- First. - Single (2019)

== Filmography ==
=== Film ===
Year	Title	Role	Notes
1998	Shirtsleeves	Meehan	Short film
1998	Stepmom	—N/a	Loop group
1999	Wirey Spindell	Mike Johnson	
1999	Liberty Heights	Murray	
2000	Finding Forrester	Student Speaker	
2004	Delivery	Trainee	Short film
2017	Flatliners	—N/a	Loop group

=== Television ===
Year	Title	Role	Notes
1998	Law & Order	Randy Baxter	Episode: "Damaged"
1999–2002	Celebrity Deathmatch	Various voice roles	4 episodes
2000	Law & Order	Student # 2	Episode: "Return"
2003	Law & Order: Special Victims Unit	Paul Howley	Episode: "Mercy"
2021–2022	Angelo Rules	Schmitty, Hunter, Alonzo, Clyde (English version, voices)	4 episodes

=== Video games ===
Year	Title	Role	Notes
2006	Bully	Jimmy Hopkins	Additional scenes/missions Unused beta scene/mission Also motion-capture in Scholarship Edition
