= Charles Hopkins =

Charles Hopkins may refer to:

- Charles Alexander Hopkins (born 1940), educator and UNESCO chair
- Charles Hopkins (poet) (c. 1664–c. 1700), Anglo-Irish poet and dramatist
- Charles Gordon Hopkins (1822–1886), politician of the Hawaiian Kingdom
- Charles Ferren Hopkins (1842–1934), Union Civil War soldier and of Medal of Honor awardee
- Charles Jerome Hopkins (1836–1898), American musician
- Charles Hopkins (died 1805), first husband of Eliza Poe
- Charles F. Hopkins, Confederate Civil War leader at the Battle of St. Johns Bluff
- Charles Hopkins, mathematician known for his role in the Hopkins–Levitzki theorem

== See also ==
- Hopkins (surname)
