= George Hopkinson House =

Historic colonial house in Groveland, Massachusetts

- U.S. National Register of Historic Places
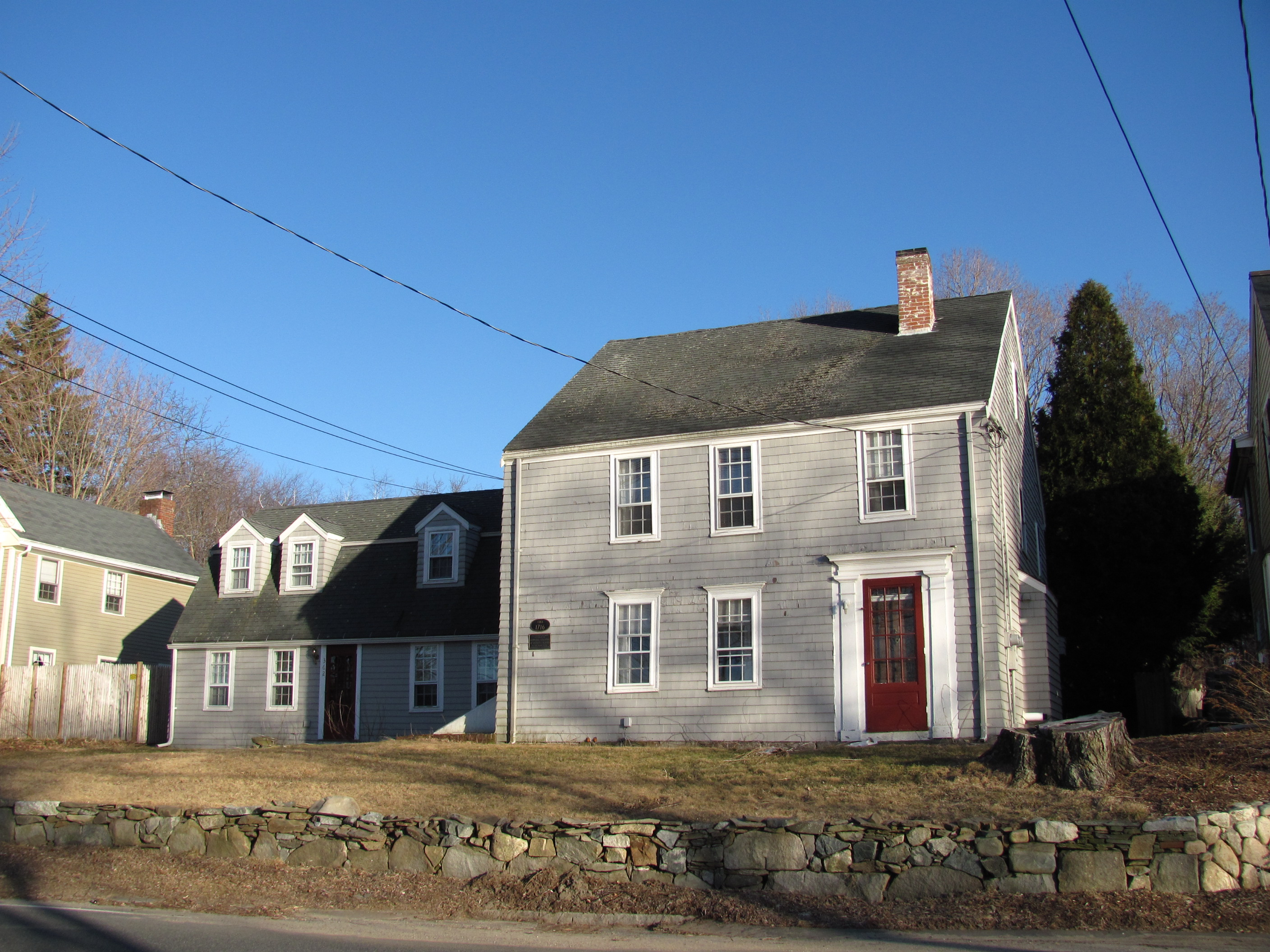
- George Hopkinson House

- Location within Massachusetts Location within the United States
- Location: 362 Main Street, Groveland, Massachusetts
- Coordinates: 42°45′34″N 71°02′09″W
- Built: 1716
- Architectural style: Colonial
- MPS: First Period Buildings of Eastern Massachusetts TR
- NRHP reference No.: 90000220
- Added to NRHP: March 9, 1990

The George Hopkinson House is a historic colonial First Period house in Groveland, Massachusetts. Built c. 1716, it is a rare surviving single cell house from the period. Most First Period houses were built in their first stage as a chimney section and a two-story section to one side, with one room on each floor, and were later extended with additional rooms on the other side of the chimney, giving colonial rooms their characteristic five bay appearance. Because this one was never extended in this way, it exhibits a three bay front, with a door in the right-side bay, in front of the chimney. A rear leanto section was added later in the 18th century, and the side ell was added in the 19th century. The house is also a rare regional instance of plank frame construction (similar to Groveland's other First Period house, the Joseph Hardy House).

The house was listed on the National Register of Historic Places in 1990.

== See also ==
- National Register of Historic Places listings in Essex County, Massachusetts
