= Judge Hopkins =

Judge Hopkins may refer to:

- James C. Hopkins (lawyer) (1819–1877), judge of the United States District Court for the Western District of Wisconsin
- Jeffery P. Hopkins (born 1960), judge of the United States District Court for the Southern District of Ohio
- Richard Joseph Hopkins (1873–1943), judge of the United States District Court for the District of Kansas
- Virginia Emerson Hopkins (born 1952), judge of the United States District Court for the Northern District of Alabama

== See also ==
- Justice Hopkins (disambiguation)
