= Bully (video game) =

2006 action-adventure video game

- NTSC cover art for PlayStation 2
- Developer: Rockstar Vancouver (Note: Scholarship Edition developed by Mad Doc Software and ported to Wii by Rockstar Toronto. Anniversary Edition developed by War Drum Studios.)
- Publisher: Rockstar Games
- Producers: Jeronimo Barrera; Steve Martin
- Designers: Mike Skupa; Sergei Kuprejanov
- Programmers: Mike Slett; Peter Grant
- Artist: Steven Olds
- Writers: Dan Houser; Jacob Krarup
- Composer: Shawn Lee
- Engine: RenderWare; Gamebryo (Scholarship Edition)
- Platforms: PlayStation 2; Wii; Xbox 360; Windows; Android; iOS
- Release: 17 October 2006: PlayStation 2; NA: 17 October 2006; EU: 25 October 2006; AU: 27 October 2006 Wii, Xbox 360; NA: 4 March 2008; PAL: 7 March 2008 Windows; WW: 21 October 2008 Android, iOS; WW: 8 December 2016
- Genre: Action-adventure
- Modes: Single-player, multiplayer (Note: Multiplayer available only for the Wii, Xbox 360, and Anniversary Edition)

Bully (released in the PAL region as Canis Canem Edit; Latin for 'dog eat dog') is a 2006 action-adventure video game developed by Rockstar Vancouver and published by Rockstar Games. Set in the fictional New England town of Bullworth, the game follows juvenile delinquent student Jimmy Hopkins, who is involuntarily enrolled at Bullworth Academy, the town's prestigious boarding school. Over the course of a school year, Jimmy attempts to rise through the ranks of the school system to end bullying, while clashing with fellow students and authority figures.

The game is played from a third-person perspective and its open world can be navigated on foot, skateboard, motor scooter, bicycle, or go-kart. Players control Jimmy as he attempts to become more popular among the school's various "cliques", in addition to attending classes and completing various side missions. The Scholarship Edition includes a two-player multiplayer mode that lets two players compete for the highest score in different classes.

Bully's expected violence and sexual content were initially controversial. The game was released on 17 October 2006 for the PlayStation 2 to positive reviews, with praise directed at its missions, narrative, characters, and soundtrack. It sold over 1.5 million copies and received multiple year-end accolades. A remastered version, subtitled Scholarship Edition, was developed by Mad Doc Software and released on 4 March 2008 for Xbox 360 and Wii, and on 21 October 2008 for Windows. Bully was re-released for the PlayStation 4, available via the PlayStation Network, on 22 March 2016. An updated version of the Scholarship Edition, titled Anniversary Edition, was developed by War Drum Studios and released for Android and iOS on 8 December 2016.

== Gameplay ==
Jimmy fighting two enemies in the schoolyard; the ring under the enemies represents their current health

Bully is an action-adventure game set in an open world environment and played from a third-person perspective. The game's single-player mode has the player control a high school student—teenage rebel, James "Jimmy" Hopkins. Throughout the story, Jimmy progresses through six chapters and through the ranks of various school groups; archetypes include Bullies, Nerds, Preppies, Greasers, Jocks and Townies. Players complete missions—linear scenarios with set objectives—to progress through the story. Missions reward the player with cash, new items, and increase/decrease the respect of certain groups. If a group holds Jimmy in high regard, they will act friendly towards him (and have the option of being hired as "bodyguards" or "muscle"); if a group despises Jimmy, they will attack him on sight. Outside of missions, the player can freely roam the game's open world, consisting of the fictional town of Bullworth, and has the ability to complete optional side missions.

When not performing missions, the player can attend classes, presented as minigames. Each course has five classes, which increase in difficulty, and passing all five will result in the player passing the course. Classes reward the player with new clothing items or abilities; for example, English allows the player to apologize to authority figures after violating rules, Chemistry allows players to create their own throwable weapons, Geography highlights special collectibles on the game's minimap, and Gym unlocks new fighting moves. Not attending classes when they are available is considered a violation of rules, unless they have been completed, in which case they become optional.

The player can use melee attacks and weapons to fight enemies. The weapons available include slingshots, bags of marbles and itching powder, stink bombs, firecrackers (including bottle rockets), baseball bats, planks of wood, and spud guns. Jimmy can run, jump, swim, climb, or use vehicles to navigate the game's world. The vehicles featured in the game include a skateboard, scooters, bicycles, and go-karts. The player can also grab onto the back of a moving car while on a skateboard, but cannot drive cars themselves. Bus stops located in various locations around the town allow the player to quickly travel back to Bullworth Academy. Should the player take damage, their health meter can be fully replenished using multiple methods, such as drinking sodas, which can be obtained from vending machines or dropped by enemies, and kissing certain NPCs after interacting with them. When the player's health is entirely depleted, gameplay stops and the player respawns at the nearest medical centre.

If the player breaks rules while playing, the game's authority figures (prefects, policemen and orderlies) may respond as indicated by a "trouble" meter in the heads-up display (HUD). The levels displayed on the meter indicate the current level of severity. Authority figures will attempt to grab and subdue the player, who may fight back. The higher the severity level is, the harder will authority figures try to catch the player; at the maximum level, the player can no longer fight back, as they will be instantly "busted" should they be grabbed. If the player is busted, they respawn at the nearest police station or the school principal's office and all their weapons (excluding the slingshot, skateboard, and camera) are confiscated. If a class is in progress, the player will instead be taken to it and forced to attend (even if they have already completed it). Authority figures can subdue other students as well, should they cause trouble.

The game's multiplayer mode, exclusive to the Scholarship Edition on Wii and Xbox 360 and the Anniversary Edition, has two players compete to gain the highest score in the same minigames used for classes. One player controls Jimmy, and the other Gary Smith.

== Synopsis ==
=== Setting ===
Bully takes place in the fictitious town of Bullworth, situated in the New England region of the United States. After being expelled from seven previous schools, the game's protagonist, 15-year-old James "Jimmy" Hopkins, is sent to the town's prominent private boarding school, Bullworth Academy, for a year while his mother and her new husband go on their honeymoon. The school campus is designed in a neo-Gothic style, similar to private schools and colleges in the United Kingdom and New England, such as Fettes College in Edinburgh. The school itself is the game's primary setting, while the rest of the town is gradually unlocked as the story progresses.

Bullworth consists of four main districts: Bullworth Town, the commercial borough; Old Bullworth Vale, a suburb area where the town's mansions, beach, and funfair are located; New Coventry, a run-down, urban-poor borough consisting mainly of tenement housing; and Blue Skies Industrial Park, an industrial borough comprising factories, industrial buildings, the town docks, and a trailer park. There is also the Happy Volts Asylum, a psychiatric institute located between the Blue Skies Industrial Park and Bullworth Academy. Because the game's story spans an entire school year, Bullworth's appearance changes between chapters, most notably during the third chapter, which takes place around the Christmas season.

=== Plot ===
After being dropped off at Bullworth Academy, Jimmy Hopkins (Gerry Rosenthal) meets the principal, Dr. Crabblesnitch (Ralph Gunderman), who warns him against misbehaving. He soon befriends fellow students Gary Smith (Peter Vack) and Peter "Pete" Kowalski (Matt Bush) and works with them to assert their dominance over Bullworth's various "cliques": the Bullies, Nerds, Preppies, Greasers, and Jocks. However, an increasingly paranoid Gary eventually betrays Jimmy and pits him against Russell Northrop (Cody Melton), leader of the Bullies, in an underground fight. Jimmy defeats Russell and persuades him to stop picking on others, earning the Bullies' respect.

Over the following months, Jimmy, aided by Pete, attempts to extend his influence by taking over the other cliques. He starts with the Preppies, but just as he begins to win them over, Gary turns them against him. In response, Jimmy challenges Bif Taylor (Andrew Rannells), the Preppies' second-in-command and Bullworth's boxing champion, to a boxing match. Despite his victory, the Preppies refuse to accept Jimmy's dominance and fight him together; Jimmy defeats them, including their leader Derby Harrington (John Lavelle), and asserts his position as the new leader. Turning his attention to the Greasers, Jimmy helps their leader, Johnny Vincent (Rocco Rosanio), expose an affair between his girlfriend Lola Lombardi (Phoebe Strole) and Preppies member Gord Vendome (Drew Gehling). However, the Greasers turn on Jimmy after he is forced to make amends with the Preppies by vandalizing the Greasers' territory. After Gary tips Johnny off on Jimmy's growing closeness to Lola, Johnny lures Jimmy into an ambush at a junkyard; Jimmy defeats Johnny and makes amends with him, securing leadership of the Greasers.

To take over the Jocks, regarded as the most powerful clique, Jimmy seeks the assistance of their main rivals, the Nerds. When they refuse to help, Jimmy confronts their leader, Earnest Jones (Jesse Tendler), and earns the Nerds' respect by promising they will never be picked on again. To ruin the Jocks' reputation, Earnest has Jimmy take inappropriate pictures of the school's head cheerleader, Mandy Wiles (Elena Franklin), which are then spread across town. However, this only ends up angering the Jocks and saddening Mandy, so Jimmy defends the Nerds' hideout from a Jock attack and removes the pictures out of pity for Mandy, earning her affection. Eventually, Jimmy humiliates the Jocks by sabotaging their big football game and defeating their leader, Ted Thompson (Alexander Cendese), in a fight in front of the entire school.

Having united all cliques under his rule, Jimmy basks in his newfound glory and respect, unaware that Gary is plotting to overthrow him. Gary convinces the clique leaders to pressure Jimmy into vandalizing Bullworth's town hall, and recruits the "Townies," a group of former Bullworth students seeking revenge against the school, to play a series of dangerous pranks on the cliques. The cliques, blaming Jimmy for the pranks, turn on him. Amid these events, Jimmy befriends Townies member Zoe Taylor (Molly Fox) and helps her exact revenge on Bullworth's predatory sports teacher Mr. Burton (Michael Boyle), who had Zoe expelled for accusing him of sexual harassment. Crabblesnitch is informed of Jimmy vandalizing the town hall by Gary, who is appointed head boy while Jimmy is expelled.

Although Jimmy initially accepts his defeat, Pete encourages him not to give up. With the aid of Zoe and Russell, Jimmy storms the Townies' hangout and confronts their leader, Edgar Munsen (Jan Milewicz), explaining to him how they were both manipulated by Gary. Having earned the Townies' respect, Jimmy returns to Bullworth, learning that Gary has sparked a full-blown war between the cliques. Aided by Russell and the Townies, Jimmy finds and defeats each clique leader to restore order, then confronts Gary, who has tied up Crabblesnitch as part of his plan to "take over" the school. Jimmy chases Gary to the rooftop, where they have a fight that culminates in both boys falling through a window and into Crabblesnitch's office. After Jimmy frees him, Crabblesnitch expels Gary, fires Burton for his predatory acts, appoints Pete as head boy, and reconciles with Jimmy by readmitting him and Zoe. Outside, while his friends and teachers cheer on, Jimmy shares a kiss with Zoe.

== Development ==
Bully was developed by Rockstar Vancouver and published by Rockstar Games. Dan Houser, Rockstar's vice president of creative, devised its premise and wrote the story with Jacob Krarup, drawing on his experiences at St Paul's School, London. When developing the characters, the team aimed at recreating the state of being a child, and making it enjoyable. Parallels were made between protagonist Jimmy Hopkins and Holden Caulfield from The Catcher in the Rye. Both characters share a background of a difficult home life and being thrown out of multiple schools. Though the pompous school principal Dr. Crabblesnitch was originally introduced as the main antagonist, this role was later given to Gary Smith, a student who initially befriends Jimmy. Gary is described as a sociopath. He admits that he is a narcissist, as he considers himself smarter and better than everyone, and wants to run the school.

Bully was developed using the RenderWare engine. Rockstar announced the game in May 2005 for the PlayStation 2 and Xbox, with an original expected release date of October 2005.

=== Scholarship Edition ===
On 19 July 2007, Rockstar announced that a remaster of Bully would be released for the Wii and Xbox 360, subtitled Scholarship Edition. Rockstar New England, then called Mad Doc Software, led the development of the Xbox 360 version while Rockstar Toronto ported it to the Wii. The Wii and Xbox 360 versions were released on 4 March 2008. A Windows port was later developed by Rockstar New England and released on 21 October 2008. Bethesda Softworks published the game for PlayStation 2 and Xbox 360 in Japan on 24 July 2008.

== Reception ==
=== Critical response ===
Bully reception

Aggregate score
Aggregator	Score
Metacritic	87/100

Review scores
Publication	Score
1Up.com	A+
GameSpot	8.7/10
GamesRadar+	4.5/5
GameTrailers	8.1/10
IGN	8.9/10
X-Play	5/5

The PlayStation 2 version of Bully received "generally favorable" reviews, according to the review aggregator website Metacritic.

Robert Ashley of 1Up.com found Bully to be a fresh approach to the open-world genre because it departed from the crime stories associated with Grand Theft Auto; Bullworth in particular was deemed to be more accessible than the sprawling world of San Andreas. GameTrailers praised the town's distinctive residents and changing seasons, and welcomed the shorter journeys between objectives. IGN's Jeremy Dunham however found the repeated travel between mission locations excessive, and criticized the slow opening chapter and occasional bugs that prevented missions from progressing.

The school story was the chief attraction for GameSpot's Jeff Gerstmann, who considered its conflicts convincing without gratuitous violence and praised Jimmy's perceptive dialogue. Dunham regarded the game as an unusually successful comedy, with a poignant story and strong characterization. Hyper's Daniel Wilks also praised the script and characters. Ashley admired the memorable cast and cinematic storytelling, although occasional stiff dialogue and a disappointing ending detracted from them. For GamesRadar's Mikel Reparaz, the story remained engaging apart from Jimmy's awkward speeches after taking control of each clique.

Combat was satisfying for both Dunham and Gerstmann, although neither found it particularly challenging. Wilks found targeting less reliable: the camera could obscure opponents, while switching targets could leave Jimmy facing the wrong direction. Dunham also encountered camera problems in confined spaces and while cycling, but Gerstmann felt camera controls rarely interfered with play.

The game's variety of missions drew a mixed response. Gerstman thought they were engaging and sustained his interest, despite their brevity and low difficulty. Ashley thought the races, classroom exercises and other diversions worked well in short sessions, and that the best missions fitted the story. Dunham also enjoyed the classroom minigames, but thought the school component was underdeveloped because players had little reason to return after passing their classes. Wilks distinguished the classes from the other minigames, which he found poorly developed; he also thought stealth missions were hampered by limited mechanics and camera problems. Gerstmann found the school timetable flexible enough to undertake activities at the player's own pace, whereas Wilks complained that the accelerated clock made classes hard to reach on time and could interrupt missions when Jimmy fell asleep.

Critics were divided over the game's graphics. Gerstmann considered the graphics impressive for the ageing PlayStation 2, particularly the cutscene animation. GameTrailers also admired the character animation but criticized blurry textures, muted colours and the limited distance at which scenery was drawn. Dunham praised the art direction and detailed environments, although he found some character animation stiff.

With respect to the voice performances, Gerstmann felt the cast's voices suited their characters, and both Dunham and Wilks praised the performances. Gerstmann and Dunham also admired Shawn Lee's original score for its contribution to the atmosphere; Wilks found the music repetitive and would have preferred songs from school films and television programmes.

==== Remaster ====
Bully: Scholarship Edition reception

Aggregate score
Aggregator	Score		
Aggregator	PC	Wii	Xbox 360
Metacritic	72/100	83/100	80/100

Review scores
Publication	Score		
Publication	PC	Wii	Xbox 360
1Up.com	C−	A−	B−
GameSpot	6/10	8/10	7/10
GamesRadar+	N/A	4.5/5	N/A
GameTrailers	N/A	8/10	8/10
IGN	7.8/10	8.0/10	8.7/10
X-Play	N/A	4/5	N/A

Bully: Scholarship Edition was released on 4 March 2008 for Wii and Xbox 360, and 21 October 2008 for Windows. According to Metacritic, the Wii and Xbox 360 versions received "generally favorable reviews", while the PC version received "mixed or average reviews". IGN gave the Wii version an 8/10, while the Xbox 360 version received 8.7/10. 1UP.com gave the Wii version an A− grade and the Xbox 360 version a B− grade. The PC version, however, received mixed reviews ranging from a "Good" rating of 7.8 from IGN to a C− from 1UP.com who called it "[a] shoddy, untimely port that, inexplicably – considering its ridiculously long port time – feels like a rush job." GameSpot later rated it with a "fair" rating of 6.0, calling it "[a] lazy porting job [which] hinders Bully's classic classroom hijinks".

The Xbox 360 version of Bully: Scholarship Edition was found to be unstable on some players' consoles, resulting in glitches, crashes, and performance issues. On 20 March, a patch was released, but there were reports claiming that the problems continued or worsened. When the Windows 10 version was released in July 2015, many users reported constant crashes and errors; many of these problems were addressed by an unofficial patch released by a fan.

=== Sales ===
As of March 2008, the PlayStation 2 version of Bully had sold 1.5 million copies according to Take-Two Interactive.

=== Awards ===
- Won GameSpot's award for Best Original Music.
- Finalist for GameSpot's Game of the Year 2006.
- Nominations for "Outstanding Achievement in Character Performance - Male" (Gerry Rosenthal as Jimmy Hopkins) and "Outstanding Achievement in Character Performance - Female" (Maine Anders as Christy Martin) at the AIAS' 10th Annual Interactive Achievement Awards.
- Gaming Target – "52 Games We'll Still Be Playing From 2006" selection.
- In 2010, the game was included as one of the games in the book 1001 Video Games You Must Play Before You Die.
- Bully: Scholarship Edition was nominated for the Best Voice Acting award for an Xbox 360 game at IGN's Best of 2008 awards.
- The PlayStation 2 version of Bully received a "Platinum" sales award from the Entertainment and Leisure Software Publishers Association (ELSPA), indicating sales of at least 300,000 copies in the United Kingdom.

== Controversy ==
Bully's title and gameplay was the subject of controversy among parents and educators who noted the adult content in previous Rockstar games, including the Grand Theft Auto: San Andreas Hot Coffee minigame. Groups such as Bullying Online and Peaceaholics criticized the game for glorifying or trivializing school bullying, although they raised their objections before the game was released to the public. The player may also choose to kiss select girls and boys in the game, which the ESRB was aware of when rating the product. Classification boards generally restricted Bully to a teenage audience: the United States–based Entertainment Software Rating Board (ESRB) gave the game a T rating, the British Board of Film Classification gave it a 15 rating, the Australian Classification Board rated it M, and the New Zealand OFLC restricted it to people 13 years of age and over.

In 2007, Yahoo! Games listed it as one of the top ten most controversial games of all time.

=== Censorship ===
Bully was banned in Brazil. In April 2008, a Brazilian judge prohibited the commerce and import of the game. The decision was based on findings by the state psychology society which stated that the game would be potentially harmful to teenagers and adults. On 23 June 2016, however, the game was officially rereleased in Brazil.

While British Labour MP Keith Vaz argued that Bully be banned or reclassified as rated 18 in the UK before its publication, the game was released rated 15. Currys and PC World, both owned by DSG International, said that they did not wish to sell the game in the UK because it is "not appropriate for Currys' family-friendly image". The statement lists what Currys believes is "the explicit link between violence and children" as the reason behind the ban. Despite this decision, other high street retailers including Game, HMV, and Virgin Megastores announced intentions to stock the game.

Prior to both the ESRB's rating and the release of Bully, Jack Thompson filed a lawsuit attempting to have the game banned from store shelves in Florida. Thompson declared the game a "nuisance" and "Columbine simulator". Thompson's petition, filed with the 11th Judicial Circuit Court, asked for Wal-Mart and Take-Two Interactive to furnish him with an advance copy of Bully so he could have "an independent third party" play the game and determine if it would constitute a public nuisance in the state of Florida, in which case it could be banned. Take-Two Interactive offered to bring in a copy and let both the judge and Thompson view the game in the judge's chambers on 12 October 2006. On 13 October 2006, Judge Ronald Friedman subsequently ruled in favour of shipping the game, noting that there was no content in the game that was not already on late night television. Thompson responded to the ruling with a fiery speech directed at the judge. When given a preview build, the mainstream American media took a generally positive view of the game. Press coverage described the game as free-form, focusing on building a social network and learning new skills from classes, with strictly enforced punishments for serious misbehaviour.

=== Lawsuit ===
In July 2008, German comedian Michael "Bully" Herbig filed a lawsuit against Take-Two Interactive, citing concerns that an association with a violent video game could harm his public image. The court dismissed the claims, ruling that no trademark or personal-name rights were infringed.

== Legacy ==
=== Cancelled sequel ===
In November 2006, Michael Pachter, managing director of research for Wedbush Morgan Securities, predicted that Bully would not sell well enough over the upcoming holidays to warrant a sequel. However, when his prediction turned out to be untrue, Pachter apologized to Rockstar Games and Take-Two Interactive, calling the sequel a "possibility".

During the development of Bully: Scholarship Edition, Mad Doc Studios was acquired by Rockstar in April 2008 and renamed to Rockstar New England. As Rockstar New England, the studio finished off Bully: Scholarship Edition as well as assisted Rockstar's other studios in supporting the DLC content for Grand Theft Auto IV (2008), and in support of Red Dead Redemption (2010). Near the end of this period, Rockstar had greenlit early production on Bully 2 at Rockstar New England. Rockstar New England had created a vision for Bully 2 that aligned with Rockstar's larger direction in developing games with higher prestige, which had started with GTA IV, Red Dead Redemption and L.A. Noire (2011), incorporating new narratives and technology to make it a more character-driven game. According to former Rockstar New England employees speaking to Game Informer, the entire studio of between 50 and 80 employees had been working on Bully 2 at one point, developing it as an open-world game with a map three times the size from the original Bully and approaching the size of the world in Grand Theft Auto: Vice City (2002); while the map did not have the scale of GTA IV, the developers were planning several deep systems that would make the map feel bigger, such as having many more buildings that could be entered on the map. Rockstar New England also planned to incorporate more artificial intelligence in the game so that player choices would have more impact later in the game. Several other new technology systems were developed by the studio, which ended up in games such as Max Payne 3 (2012) and Red Dead Redemption 2 (2018).

By around 2009, Rockstar New England had developed a playable vertical slice of the game in place with working versions of these new systems which they presented to Rockstar as a project milestone. Former developers stated this had about six to eight hours of content, consistent with other Rockstar projects, and was about two to three years from a final version. Though Rockstar did not state anything directly, something had changed in the studio's attitude according to former developers, leading up to Rockstar laying off about 10% of Rockstar New England in June 2009, and in 2010 they started pulling staff working on Bully 2 onto supporting projects from other Rockstar studios, effectively cancelling further development on Bully 2.

Rumours and comments related to Bully 2 still persisted after this point. In November 2009, The Gaming Liberty interviewed musician Shawn Lee, who scored Bully, and was asked if he was scoring any more games in the near future; he responded, "Yes. It looks like I will be doing the soundtrack for Bully 2 in the not so distant future".

In November 2011, in an interview with Gamasutra, Rockstar executive Dan Houser revealed that the studio might focus on a sequel for Bully after the release of Max Payne 3. "Contrary to a lot of people, we like to take a little bit of time at the end of a game before starting a sequel, so we can wait for the excitement or disappointment and everything else of the experience to shake down and really see what we should do in the next game," he said. "So we knew that we didn't want to start doing the Bully sequel instantly at that second with Rockstar Vancouver even though it is a property that, like Max Payne, we adore and might come back to in the future. There was just no impetus to do that then. So we said, 'You can do Max Payne, and then we will see what we can do with Bully.'"

In September 2013, Dan Houser said he had many different ideas for a Bully sequel.

On 28 August 2017, concept art rumoured to be from the development of a sequel leaked online; it purported to show new characters and a run-down suburban home along with a few other bits of art; Rockstar Games did not comment.

In July 2019, a Rockstar New England ex-employee revealed that Rockstar had worked on a sequel for several months before shutting it down in 2009. He claimed to have worked on various game mechanics in the scrapped project and stated that the story would have featured Jimmy living with his mother and step-siblings in his stepfather's mansion during summer vacation.

In October 2019, Video Games Chronicle published a story based on inside sources corroborating that Rockstar had indeed worked on Bully 2 for eighteen months before cancelling it. Production of the game however began in May 2010, shortly after Red Dead Redemption was released, and eventually was discontinued sometime before the end of 2013 as the project did not get much traction in the studio. During this time, a reported small slice of a working game was built using the Rockstar Advanced Game Engine (RAGE). According to these sources, the studio had worked out some of the story but were not sure what period of time it would cover. One source confirmed the ex-employee's claims that the story began with Jimmy spending summer vacation with his mother and stepfamily. In 2025, following his departure from Rockstar, Dan Houser said he believed it was "bandwidth issues" that stalled development.

=== Fan modification ===
An unofficial online multiplayer modification of Bully, titled Bully Online, was revealed in October 2025. Developed for years by Fat Pigeon, a group of modders led by the YouTuber Swegta, it was released on 15 December 2025. One month after release, on 14 January 2026, the modification was indefinitely shuttered. The developers said the shutdown was "not something we wanted"; some journalists and fans suspected Rockstar or Take-Two had forced the decision.
