= Liberty Heights =

1999 American comedy-drama film by Barry Levinson

- Theatrical release poster
- Directed by: Barry Levinson
- Written by: Barry Levinson
- Produced by: Barry Levinson; Paula Weinstein
- Starring: Adrien Brody; Bebe Neuwirth; Joe Mantegna
- Cinematography: Christopher Doyle
- Edited by: Stu Linder
- Music by: Andrea Morricone
- Production company: Baltimore/Spring Creek Pictures
- Distributed by: Warner Bros.
- Release date: November 17, 1999 (United States)
- Running time: 127 minutes
- Language: English
- Budget: $11 million
- Box office: $3.7 million

Liberty Heights is a 1999 American comedy-drama film written and directed by Barry Levinson. The film is a semi-autobiographical account of his childhood growing up in Baltimore in the 1950s. The film portrays instances of social injustices encountered by Jewish and African-American populations.

The two sons of Nate Kurtzman are attracted to young women who happen to be on the other side of social divides of the period. Their father Nate goes to prison for running a burlesque show with Little Melvin, an African-American local drug dealer.

It is the fourth of Levinson's "Baltimore Films", set in his hometown during the 1940s, 1950s, and 1960s; the first three are Diner (1982), Tin Men (1987) and Avalon (1990).

== Plot ==
In the fall of 1954, the Kurtzmans, a Jewish family, live in Forest Park, a suburban neighborhood in northwest Baltimore. Nate, the father, runs a burlesque theater and engages in a numbers racket. His wife Ada is a homemaker. Van, the older son, attends the University of Baltimore and Ben is in his senior year in high school.

Ben meets Sylvia, an African-American girl, who begins attending his school after the district is integrated. Despite Ada's disapproval, Ben starts to develop feelings for Sylvia and introduces himself. They become close based on a mutual love for Little Richard, James Brown, jazz and black comedians. Sylvia's father, an affluent doctor, also disapproves of their relationship, in part becsuse of class issues, and forbids them to see one another.

On Halloween, Ben dresses up as Adolf Hitler, which shocks Nate and Ada, they forbid him to go out in public wearing that costume. Van and his friends head over to a party in a predominantly bourgeois, gentile section of town. He is attracted to a mysterious blonde woman. A fight between one of Van's friends and a local erupts over the guy's bigoted comments. Trey Tobelseted, one of the partygoers, drunkenly crashes his car into the house. Van leaves the party and the blonde, revealed to be Trey's girlfriend, Dubbie. He and his friends later drive around searching for her, but are unsuccessful.

Trey goes to court for the car crash. Van and his friends are there as witnesses but they find ways to avoid testifying against him, winning Trey's appreciation and friendship. After the hearing is over, Van asks Trey about the blonde woman he met. Trey realizes Van is asking about Dubbie but says nothing.

Meanwhile, Nate's burlesque theatre is in financial trouble. To boost returns on the numbers game, he adds a bonus number to increase the pay-off. Little Melvin, a local drug dealer, makes a large bet and hits the number. Unable to pay out such a big win, Nate is forced to cut Melvin in on the racket. When Nate offers Melvin the numbers business instead, Melvin claims that Nate is trying to "Jew" him out of his money, and a fight breaks out between their bodyguards.

Sylvia invites Ben to see James Brown & The Famous Flames in concert. There, Ben and his friend Sheldon are the only whites in the audience. Van and his friends head out to another party, where he again runs into Dubbie and learns she and Trey are dating.

Little Melvin spots Nate's car off of Pennsylvania Avenue in the African-American neighborhood where James Brown is performing and, after seeing Ben and his friend inside, figures that one must be Nate's son. After the concert, Melvin abducts Ben, Sylvia and their friends and holds them for ransom to force Nate to pay what he owes Melvin. Nate pays the ransom and becomes aware of Ben's forbidden relationship with Sylvia.

Van discovers Trey is having surgery after another drunken car accident. He and Dubbie visit him at a hospital in Virginia. Trey breaks up with her. On the way back to Maryland with Van, she suggests they stop in a motel. They begin to be intimate but the drunk Dubbie acts erratic, bursts into tears and vomits in the toilet. Van realizes she is emotionally disturbed and does not return his feelings.

After Annie, a popular new burlesque performer, takes her act too far, Nate and his nightclub associates are charged and booked with prostitution and racketeering.

Before leaving for prison, Nate attends Ben and Sylvia's high school graduation. She will attend Spelman College in Atlanta; Ben will attend the local University of Maryland. When they kiss each other goodbye, both families are shocked.

Ben, Sheldon and their friend Murray tear down the segregation notice from the pool entrance and enter. They remove their shirts to show all the patrons the letters "J-E-W" written on their chests and defiantly sit enjoying their last summer before college.

When Nate is sentenced to several years in prison, Van asks Trey to use his powerful father's influence to allow Nate to attend a final service at their synagogue being incarcerated. Before the service, Nate encourages his sons to finish their educations and pursue legitimate careers. At the synagogue, Nate walks out before the end of the service and blows a kiss to Ada as he leaves.

== Cast ==
- Adrien Brody as Van Kurtzman
- Ben Foster as Ben Kurtzman
- Orlando Jones as "Little Melvin"
- Bebe Neuwirth as Ada Kurtzman
- Joe Mantegna as Nate Kurtzman
- Rebekah Johnson as Sylvia
- Gerry Rosenthal as Murray
- David Krumholtz as Yussel
- Justin Chambers as Trey Tobelseted
- Carolyn Murphy as "Dubbie"
- Kevin Sussman as Alan
- Shane West as Ted
- Anthony Anderson as "Scribbles"
- Elizabeth Ann Bennett as Mary
- Carlton J. Smith as James Brown
- Richard Kline as Charlie
- Vincent Guastaferro as Pete
- James Pickens Jr. as Sylvia's Father
- Kiersten Warren as Annie
- Charley Scalies as Louie
- Katie Finneran as Mrs. Johnson
- Frania Rubinek as Grandma Rose
- Evan Neuman as Sheldon
- Cloie Wyatt Taylor as Gail
- Ellyn O'Connell as Anne Whittier
- Timothy J. Scanlin Jr. as Nick
- Jake Hoffman as "Turk"
- Joseph Patrick Abel as Lenny
- Brenda Russell as Singer
- Misha Collins as Guy
- Stacy Keibler as Extra

Liberty Heights marked the last appearance of Ralph Tabakin, who appeared in cameo roles in every Barry Levinson movie since his first, Diner. Tabakin died in 2001.

== Soundtrack ==
Two Liberty Heights soundtracks were released on January 4, 2000: one of the score by Andrea Morricone and one of the music appearing in the film.

== Reception ==
The film earned positive reviews from critics. On the review aggregator website Rotten Tomatoes, 86% of 50 critics' reviews are positive. The website's consensus reads: "A moving film with moments of humor, Liberty Heights succeeds in capturing the feel of the '50s with great performances and sensitive direction." Metacritic, which uses a weighted average, assigned the film a score of 75 out of 100, based on 31 critics, indicating "generally favorable" reviews.

Roger Ebert of the Chicago Sun-Times gave the film three and a half out of four stars and wrote that it's "an accurate memory of that time when the American melting pot, splendid as a theory, became a reality."
