= Ambrose Hopkinson House =

Historic house in Illinois, United States

- U.S. National Register of Historic Places
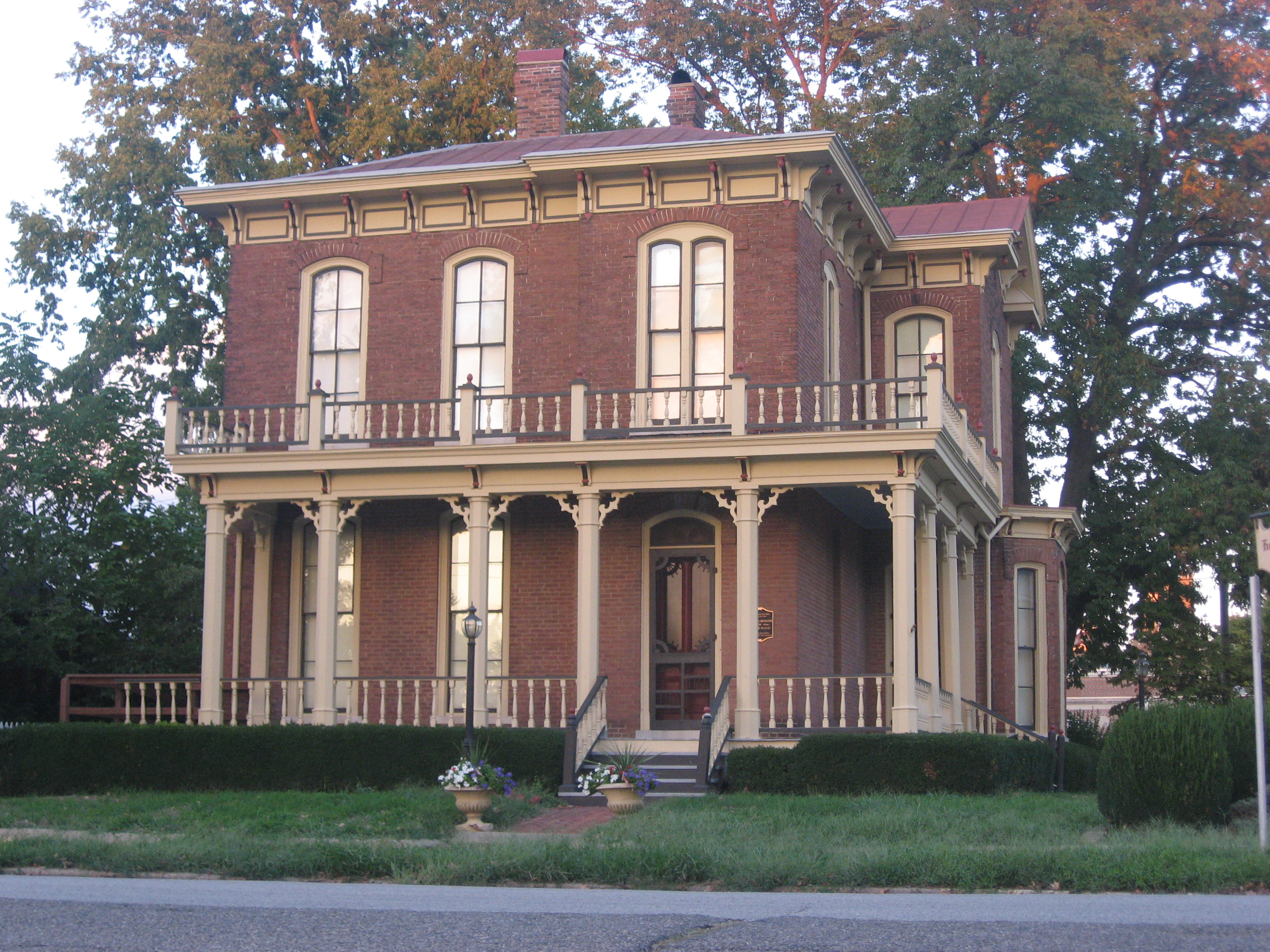
- The house's front side in 2012

- Location within Illinois Location within the United States
- Location: 122 W. Elm St., Olney, Illinois
- Coordinates: 38°43′44″N 88°5′9″W
- Area: less than one acre
- Built: 1874
- Built by: Hopkinson, Ambrose
- Architectural style: Italianate
- NRHP reference No.: 01000083
- Added to NRHP: February 9, 2001

The Ambrose Hopkinson House is a historic house located at 122 W. Elm St. in Olney, Illinois. The house was built in 1874 by owner Ambrose Hopkinson, a contractor and bricklayer who immigrated to Illinois from England. The two-story red brick house is designed in the Italianate style. The wraparound porch on the front of the house is supported by chamfered columns and has balustrades on both stories. The entrance bay projects slightly from the house; the main door is decorated with red glass panels and circular moldings. The house's cornice is composed of decorative panels separated by brackets.

The house is now a historic house museum operated by the Richland Heritage Museum Foundation, and is known as the Heritage House.

The house was added to the National Register of Historic Places on February 9, 2001.
