= Michael Hopkins =

Michael or Mike Hopkins may refer to:

== Sports ==
- Mike Hopkins (baseball) (1872–1952), baseball player
- Mike Hopkins (basketball) (born 1969), American basketball coach who played at Syracuse
- Michael Hopkins (basketball) (born 1960), American former basketball coach who played at Coastal College

== Other people ==
- Michael Hopkins (architect) (1935–2023), English architect
- Michael J. Hopkins (born 1958), American mathematician
- Michael S. Hopkins (born 1968), NASA astronaut
- Mike Hopkins (sound editor) (1959–2012), sound editor for The Lord of the Rings: The Two Towers and King Kong
- Mike Hopkins (politician) (born 1984), member of the Montana House of Representatives
