= Ian Hopkinson =

English footballer (born 1950)

Personal information
- Full name: Ian John Hopkinson
- Date of birth: 19 October 1950
- Place of birth: Newcastle upon Tyne, England
- Position: Forward

Youth career
- –: Newcastle United

Senior career*
Years	Team	Apps	(Gls)
1969–1971	Barrow	22	(1)
1971–1972	Workington	19	(7)
1972	Berwick Rangers	4	(0)
1972–1973	Darlington	9	(1)
–	North Shields		
–	Gateshead United		
- * Club domestic league appearances and goals

Ian John Hopkinson (born 19 October 1950) is an English former footballer who played as a forward in the Football League for Barrow, Workington and Darlington, and in the Scottish League for Berwick Rangers. He began his career as an apprentice with Newcastle United, and also played non-league football for North Shields and Gateshead United.
