= Bullying UK =

British charitable organization

- Formation: 1999
- Purpose: Humanitarian
- Headquarters: Harrogate, England
- Region served: United Kingdom
- Official language: English
- Director and co-founder: Liz Carnell
- Affiliations: Unite Against Bullying
- Website: bullying.co.uk
- Formerly called: Bullying Online

Bullying UK, formerly Bullying Online, is a UK charity founded in 1999 by journalist Liz Carnell and her son John. The charity's website was redesigned and relaunched in 2006 with a large amount of new information to help pupils, parents and schools deal with bullying.

== Website ==
Pupils can find help on dealing with violence and name calling, homophobia, racism, hi-tech bullying like happy slapping, text bullying by phone and abusive websites, self-harm, falling out with friends, bullying on the school bus and walk to school, body language, how to help someone being bullied and moving to a new school. There is also advice for pupils who are bullies.

Parents can find help on taking a complaint through the education system, from the classroom teacher, head teacher or principal, governors, local education authority (LEA) and Department for Education and Skills. There are sections for parents dealing with hi-tech bullying, including abusive internet website postings, racism, bullying in independent or private schools, bullying out of school, moving a child to a new school, access to pupil records, teacher bullying and legal action. A well-used part of the website is the section containing letters for parents to copy out to start a complaint to a school.

The schools' section has been expanded recently and includes advice on dealing with bullying victims, bullies and parents and ideas for school projects. There is a large section about bullying in sport. The sections include information and advice for school ancillary workers like teaching assistants, dinner ladies and school nurses.

Help is given by email through the contact section of the website and leaflets and posters are also available to schools, police forces, health trusts and youth organisations.

== Public profile ==
The charity has a high public profile, and was mentioned by Phil Willis MP in the UK Parliament as being in the vanguard of anti-bullying work. It has also been featured widely in the UK national media, particularly in newspapers like the Daily Mirror, BBC, The Times and The Independent.

The charity has been an outspoken critic of government anti-bullying work, including the taxpayers' funding of the controversial Anti-Bullying Alliance. Director Liz Carnell is a regular contributor to TV and radio debates on school bullying and also writes for the national media like the Times Educational Supplement on school bullying issues.

In January 2006, the charity launched The National Bullying Survey 2006. More than 8,000 people have completed one of four sections of the survey, for parents, pupils, teachers and older people who were bullied at school. The survey is now closed, and the results were announced in November 2006.

== Funding ==
Bullying UK provides a free service. Recent funders have included Simplyhealth, GE Money and Royal Mail. Individuals and schools are encouraged to carry out fundraising to support the charity’s work.
