= Mary Hopkins =

Mary Hopkins may refer to:

- Mary Alden Hopkins (1876–1960), American journalist, essayist, and activist
- Mary E. Hopkins (fl. 1868), married Roswell K. Colcord, Nevada governor
- Mary Ellen Hopkins (1932–2013), American quilter
- Mary Rice Hopkins, Christian children's musician
- Mary Sargent Hopkins (1847–1924), American women's health advocate and bicycle enthusiast
- Mary Hopkins Searles (1818–1891), American millionaire

== See also ==
- Mary Hopkin (born 1950), Welsh folk singer best known for singing "Those Were the Days"
- Marie Hopkins, American politician
