= Arthur Hopkins (disambiguation) =

Arthur Hopkins (1878–1950) was a Broadway theater director and producer.

Arthur Hopkins may also refer to:

- Arthur F. Hopkins (1794–1865), Justice of the Supreme Court of Alabama
- Arthur Hopkins (missionary) (1869–1943), British missionary
- Dai Hopkins (footballer, born 1902) (Arthur David Hopkins, 1902–1943), Welsh footballer
