= Gordon Hopkinson =

English former footballer

Gordan Hopkinson
Personal information
- Date of birth: 19 June 1933 (age 93)
- Place of birth: Sheffield, England
- Position: Defender

Senior career*
Years	Team	Apps	(Gls)
1957–1958	Doncaster Rovers	10	(0)
1958–1961	Bristol City	73	(1)
1961–1962	Cheltenham Town	35	(2)
1962–1966	Toronto Italia-Falcons		
1962	Toronto Ulster United		
1962–1963	New York Ukrainians		
1964–1965	Vancouver Columbus		
1965–1966	Margate	37	(0)
- * Club domestic league appearances and goals

Gordon Hopkinson (born 19 June 1933) is an English former footballer who played as a defender.

== Career ==
Hopkinson played with Beighton Miners Welfare, and in 1957, he played in the Football League Second Division with Doncaster Rovers. He made his debut for Doncaster against Fulham. The following season, he played with Bristol City F.C.and played a total of 73 matches for two seasons. In 1961, he played for Cheltenham Town F.C. in the Southern Football League. In the summer of 1962, he played abroad in the Eastern Canada Professional Soccer League with Toronto Italia.

After the conclusion of the ECPSL season, he played in the National Soccer League with Toronto Ulster United. In the winter of 1962, he played in the German-American Soccer League with New York Ukrainians. He returned to Toronto Italia for the 1963 ECPSL season and assisted in securing the ECPSL Championship after defeating Montreal Cantalia. Hopkinson re-signed with Italia for the 1964 season. In the winter of 1964, he played in the Pacific Coast Soccer League with Vancouver Columbus.

After a stint in Western Canada, he returned to Toronto Italia in 1965 for his fourth season. Throughout the season, he assisted Toronto in securing its second championship against Hamilton Primos. After a four-year stint abroad, he returned to England in late 1965 to play in the Southern League with Margate F.C. In his debut season with Margate, he appeared in 37 matches and was released after the season. He returned to his former club, Toronto Italia (renamed Toronto Italia-Falcons), for the 1966 season. In his final season with Toronto, he assisted in clinching the regular-season title.
