= Joseph Hardy House =

Historic house in Massachusetts, United States

- U.S. National Register of Historic Places
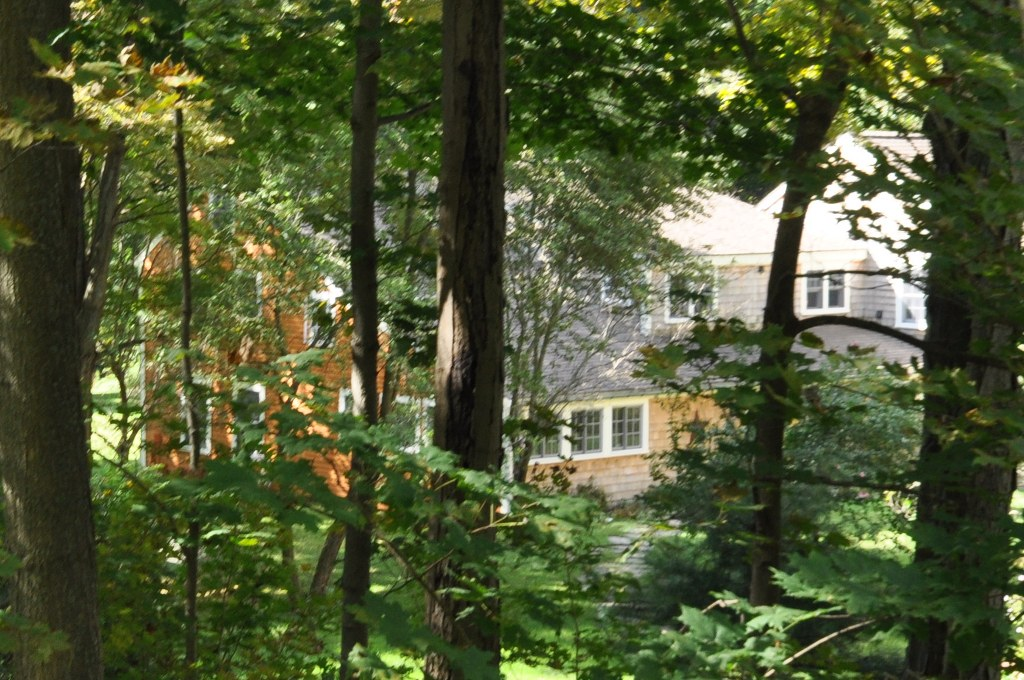

- Location within Massachusetts Location within the United States
- Location: 69 King St., Groveland, Massachusetts
- Coordinates: 42°45′30″N 71°1′23″W
- Area: 8.3 acres (3.4 ha)
- Architectural style: Colonial
- MPS: First Period Buildings of Eastern Massachusetts TR
- NRHP reference No.: 90000219
- Added to NRHP: March 9, 1990

The Joseph Hardy House is a historic late First Period house in Groveland, Massachusetts. Built about 1676 with plank frame construction, it is a relatively rare example of that form in the region. The house was listed on the National Register of Historic Places in 1990.

== Description and history ==
The Joseph Hardy House stands in a rural residential area of eastern Groveland, on the west side of King Street south of its junction with Outlook Drive. It is a 2 1/2-story timber-frame structure, with a side gable roof, central chimney, and clapboarded exterior, set back from the road and facing south. The rear roofline descends to the first floor, giving the house a classic New England saltbox profile. Its main facade is five bays wide, with small second-floor windows set close to the eave, and taller 20th-century windows on the ground floor, flanking the central entrance. The interior follows a typical center-chimney plan, with a narrow vestibule in front of the chimney and chambers to either side. The rooms have exposed beams in the First Period style, with evidence of plank framing the woodwork surrounding the chimney.

According to local history, the house was built about 1676 by Joseph Hardy, which is supported by analysis of the construction techniques used. It is a relatively infrequent instance of plank frame construction which is not usually found in the region. One half of the saltbox leanto section was added sometime later in the 18th century; the other was added early in the 20th century. The house remained in the hands of Hardy's descendants into the mid-19th century.

== See also ==
- National Register of Historic Places listings in Essex County, Massachusetts
