= William Hopkins (disambiguation) =

William Hopkins (1793–1866) was an English mathematician and geologist.

William Hopkins may also refer to:

- Bill Hopkins (Australian footballer) (born 1936), Australian rules footballer
- William Hopkins (architect) (1820–1901), architect to the Diocese of Worcester, England
- William Hopkins (Bewdley MP) (died 1647), English politician who won election to the House of Commons in 1647
- William Hopkins (Canadian politician) (1864–1935), hardware merchant and political figure in Saskatchewan, Canada
- Bill Hopkins (composer) (1943–1981), British composer, pianist and critic
- William Hopkins (footballer, born 1871) (1871-?), English footballer, played for Derby County and Ardwick
- Bill Hopkins (footballer, born 1888) (1888–1938), English footballer
- Bill Hopkins (novelist) (1928–2011), British author
- William Hopkins (speaker) (1647–1723), politician from Rhode Island
- William B. Hopkins (Virginia politician) (1922–2012), American politician
- William B. Hopkins (Maryland politician) (died 1909), American politician
- William Hersey Hopkins (1841–1919), American academic and college administrator
- William J. Hopkins (civil servant) (1910–2004), American civil servant
- William R. Hopkins (1869–1961), city manager of Cleveland, Ohio

== See also ==
- William E. Hopkin (died 1953), Welsh trade union leader
