= John Hopkins =

John Hopkins may refer to:

== Politics ==
- John Hopkins (Bristol MP), member of the English House of Commons in 1601
- John Hopkins (died 1732), English merchant, Member of Parliament (MP) for St Ives 1710–15 and Ilchester 1715–22
- John Hopkins (South Carolina politician), lieutenant governor of South Carolina, 1806-1808
- John Patrick Hopkins (1858–1918), mayor of Chicago 1893–1895
- John Rout Hopkins (1829–1897), politician of Victoria, Australia
- Sir John Hopkins, 1st Baronet (1863–1946), English Conservative Party politician, Member of Parliament (MP) for St Pancras South East 1918–23 and 1924–29
- John Marquis Hopkins (1870–1912), Australian politician

== Sports ==
- John Hopkins (cricketer) (born 1953), former Welsh cricketer
- John Hopkins (American football) (born c. 1969), American football placekicker
- John Hopkins (motorcyclist) (born 1983), American motorcycle racer

== Arts and entertainment ==
- John Hopkins (actor) (born 1974), British actor
- John Hopkins (artist), Australian artist, winner of John McCaughey Prize in 1981
- John Hopkins (composer) (born 1949), British composer
- John Hopkins (conductor) (1927–2013), British-born Australian conductor
- John Hopkins (poet) (1675–?), English poet
- John Hopkins, psalmist (see Metrical psalter)
- John Hopkins (screenwriter) (1931–1998), British film and television writer
- John Driskell Hopkins (born 1971), guitarist and vocalist for the Zac Brown Band
- John Henry Hopkins Jr. (1820–1891), Pittsburgh-born writer of the carol "We Three Kings of Orient Are"
- John Hopkins the Third, a 1921 film featuring Béla Lugosi
- John Larkin Hopkins (1819–1873), English organist
- John Hopkins (travel writer) (1938–2021), American travel writer
- John Christian Hopkins (born 1960), Narragansett journalist, author, poet and public speaker
- Jon Hopkins (born 1979), English musician and producer

== Other ==
- John Hopkins (political activist) (1937–2015), also known as "Hoppy", British activist, journalist and photographer
- John Hopkins (lawyer) (1936–2018), British academic
- John Henry Hopkins (1792–1868), Episcopal presiding bishop
- John Jay Hopkins (1893–1957), American executive; founder and president of General Dynamics
- John Hopkins (Royal Navy officer) (1834–1916), British admiral
- John Burroughs Hopkins (1742–1796), captain of the Continental Navy during the American Revolutionary War
- John Collier Frederick Hopkins (1898–1981), British mycologist
- John W. Hopkins (1953–2000), American serial killer and kidnapper
- J. W. Hopkins (1908–1989), Canadian statistician

== See also ==
- Johns Hopkins (1795–1873), American businessman and philanthropist, benefactor of
  - Johns Hopkins University
  - Johns Hopkins Hospital
  - Johns Hopkins School of Medicine
