= Mark Hopkins =

Mark Hopkins may refer to:

- Mark Hopkins (educator) (1802–1887), American educator
- Mark N. Hopkins, filmmaker
- Mark Hopkins Jr. (1813–1878), American railroad magnate
- Mark Hopkins Hotel, a luxury hotel in the Nob Hill district of San Francisco, California
