= Greta Hopkinson =

British wood sculptor

Greta Hopkinson (born Greta Karin Louise Stromeyer, 4 October 1901 – September 1993) was a British wood sculptor.

== Biography ==
Hopkinson was born in West Didsbury, Manchester. Her father, Charles Edmund Stromeyer, was a British civil engineer (expert on ship boiler design and designer of a shell-propelled grappling hook used during World War I to remove barbed wire fences), and her mother, Alma Karin Lindstein, was an acclaimed Swedish singer.

She was educated at Ladybarn House School, Withington Girls' School, Manchester, and Sandecotes School in Parkston, Dorset. She then studied Modern and Mediaeval Languages at Newnham College, Cambridge (1921–24), becoming one of its youngest female graduates. She was employed as Secretary to the Editor of the New Statesman, Clifford Dyce Sharp (1928–29), for a while.

On 8 June 1929, she married Dr. Harry Cunliffe Hopkinson (d.1965) and travelled Europe with him. After the War, they lived on the Isle of Wight before retiring to Pine Cottage, a house on the edge of the New Forest and previously the home of Gordon Jacob, the well-known British composer. Hopkinson died in Brockenhurst, Hampshire,

== Exhibitions ==
Her work appeared at the 1977 Southampton Art Gallery exhibition "Dead Wood Alive." In the early 1990s, Hopkinson's work was also exhibited in the New Forest, alongside that of Royal Academy painter Barry Peckham, whose subjects include the Solent and Hampshire.
