= Raymond F. Hopkins =

American political science professor and expert on food politics and food policy

Raymond F. Hopkins (born February 15, 1939) is an American political science professor and expert on food politics and food policy. Hopkins taught at Swarthmore College from 1967 until his retirement in 2007, where he was the Richter Professor of Political Science.

Hopkins's research interests range from international organizations, economic development, and political economy to all aspects of food politics and food policy including food supply, security, and aid as well as hunger/famine and agricultural policy.

== Biography ==
Hopkins graduated from Ohio Wesleyan University in 1960 with a Bachelor of Arts degree in philosophy. He attended Yale Divinity School and studied theology in 1961 but soon left to attend Ohio State University, where he received his Master of Arts in political science in 1963. He later returned to Yale University, where he received another Master of Arts and his Ph.D. in political science in 1968.

Hopkins taught at Swarthmore from 1967 until his retirement in 2007. He was made a full professor in 1978 and was made the Richter Professor of Political Science in 1995. Hopkins was chair of the political science department at Swarthmore from 1983 to 1984 and from 1997 to 2000, and the director of the public policy program from 1989 to 1996.

Hopkins is married, has two grown children, and lives in Swarthmore, Pennsylvania.

== Former positions and activities ==
Positions

- 2000–2001: Acting chair, Department of Political Science, Swarthmore College
- 1998–1999: Visiting scholar, Harvard University, Weatherhead Center for International Affairs
- 1989–1996: Director, Public Policy Program, Swarthmore College
- 1987–1990: Chair, Department of Political Science, Swarthmore College
- 1984–1988: Director, Food Policy Program
- 1984–1985: Visiting Research Fellow, International Food Policy Research Institute, Washington, D.C.
- 1983–1984: Acting chair, Department of Political Science, Swarthmore College
- 1982–1983: Visiting scholar, Food Research Institute, Stanford University
- 1975: Research fellow, Center for International Affairs, Harvard University
- 1974–1975: Fellow, Woodrow Wilson International Center for Scholars, Washington, D.C.
- 1973–1974: Director, Center for Social and Policy Studies
- 1971: Research associate, University of Nairobi, Kenya
- 1970–1971: Visiting research associate, Indiana University
- 1969: Research associate, summer, Harvard University, Center for International Affairs
- 1968: Visiting scholar, summer, University of Michigan
- 1965–1966: Research associate, University College, Dar es Salaam, Tanzania
- 1964: Summer, Arms Control and Disarmament Agency—Special Study on Europe directed by Karl Deutsch
- 1963: Summer, Special study of Federal Reserve System, commissioned by Hon. Wright Patman, directed by *Harvey Mansfield
- 1962: Intern, summer, Ohio Democratic Headquarters, work on Governor DiSalle's re-election campaign
- 1960–1961: Assistant pastor, Newfield Methodist Church; aide, Yale Psychiatric Institute

visiting professorships

- Visiting professor, Department of Political Science, University of Pennsylvania, 1976, 1977, 1979.
- Visiting professor of political science, Columbia University, 1980.
- Visiting professor of public and international affairs, Princeton University, 1985.
- Visiting Fulbright Distinguished Chair in International Economics, University of Tuscia, Viterbo, Italy, 1995.

Congressional testimony

- House Committee on Foreign Affairs, Subcommittee on Africa, 1986.
- House Committee on Science, Space and Technology, Subcommittee on Natural Resources, Agricultural Research and Environment, 1989.
- House Select Committee on Hunger, "Restructuring Food Aid: Time for a Change?" Hearing held in Washington, D.C., June 22, 1989, Serial No. 101-9 (Washington: U.S. Government Printing Office, 1989).
- House Committee on Foreign Affairs, Subcommittee on International Economic Policy and Trade, "Improving Food Aid: The Rationale for Reform in PL480," Washington, D.C., April 18, 1990.

Research and professional service

- Board of Editors, Simulation & Games, 1977–1980
- Board of Editors, Comparative Strategy, 1979–1987
- Board of Editors, International Political Economy Yearbook, 1984–2000

Consultancies

- U.S. State Department, 1977–78
- U.S. Agency for International Development, 1979–83, 1988–94
- World Food Programme (Rome), 1985–86, 1990–91, 1994–96
- Food and Agricultural Organization (Rome), 1983–87
- World Bank, 1988–1992
- CARE, 1979, 1993, 2000

Fellowships/grants

- National Defense Education Fellow (1961–63)
- Yale International Relations Grant
- Danforth Teaching Intern (1963–67)
- Foreign Area Fellow (1965–67)
- Social Science Research Council (1969)
- The American Philosophical Society (1971)
- National Endowment for the Humanities (1973)
- Guggenheim Fellow (1974)
- Fellow, Woodrow Wilson International Center for Scholars (1975)
- Rockefeller Fellow in International Conflict (1979)
- Heinz Endowment (1982)
- German Marshall Fund Fellow (1986)
- Pew Faculty Fellowship, Harvard (1993)
- Fulbright Fellowship (1995 – Italy: Distinguished Chair, International Economics)
- Lang Faculty Fellowship (1998–99)

Honors

- Phi Beta Kappa
- Pi Sigma Alpha
- Distinction on Ph.D. dissertation
- Executive Committee, American Political Science Association, 1992–1994
- Executive Committee, IO Section, International Studies Association, 1993–1996
