= William Hopkinson (cricketer) =

English cricketer

William Hopkinson (29 April 1835 – 25 November 1913) was an English professional cricketer who played for Kent County Cricket Club in the early 1860s.

Hopkinson was born on 29 April 1835 in Staveley, Derbyshire and played cricket for a Derbyshire team in his youth. In around 1855 he moved to Chatham in Kent to work as an engine fitter in the Royal Naval dockyard in the town. He played as a professional for Kent County Cricket Club between 1861 and 1863, making a total of 13 first-class cricket appearances, all bar one of them for the county team. Hopkinson left the Kent staff after the 1863 season and took a position as a cricket coach at Lancing College and then Westminster School.

Hopkinson died, aged 78, on 25 November 1913 in Gillingham, Kent.

== Bibliography ==
- Carlaw, Derek (2020). Kent County Cricketers, A to Z: Part One (1806–1914) (PDF). Cardiff: ACS.
