= Edward Hopkins (disambiguation) =

Edward Hopkins (1600–1657) was an English-American settler and politician.

Edward Hopkins may also refer to:

- Edward Hopkins (MP) (c. 1675–1736), Member of the Parliament of Ireland and Chief Secretary for Ireland
- Edward John Hopkins (1818–1901), English organist and composer
- Edward Nicholas Hopkins (1855–1935), Canadian farmer, manufacturer and politician
- Edward Washburn Hopkins (1857–1932), philologist
- Edward A. Hopkins (1902-1992), Australian photographer
- Ted Hopkins (1949–2023), Edward "Ted" Hopkins, Australian rules footballer
