= Stephen Hopkins =

Stephen Hopkins or Steve Hopkins may refer to:

- Stephen Hopkins (pilgrim) (c. 1581–1644), passenger on the Mayflower and one of forty-one signatories of the Mayflower Compact
- Stephen Hopkins (politician) (1707–1785), Rhode Island governor and signer of the Declaration of Independence
  - SS Stephen Hopkins, a 1942 World War II Liberty ship named for him
- Stephen T. Hopkins (1849–1892), U.S. Representative from New York
- Stephen Hopkins (director) (born 1958), Jamaican-born film and television director
- Stephen Hopkins (musician) (born 1951), also known as Steve Hopkins, former England based musician and current physicist
- Steve Hopkins (composer), music composer, producer and musician based in Los Angeles, California
- Steve Hopkins (Mississippi politician) (born 1962), member of the Mississippi House of Representatives
