= James Hopkins (footballer, born 1873) =

English footballer

James Hopkins (born 1873) was an English footballer. His regular position was as an inside right. He was born in Manchester. He played a single game for Newton Heath, the club that would later become Manchester United, against New Brighton Tower on 18 March 1899, having previously played for Berry's Association.
