= Grace Hopkinson Eliot Hall =

- Eliot Hall at Radcliffe College
- U.S. National Register of Historic Places
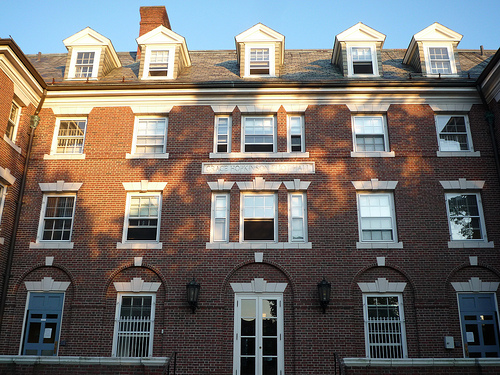
- Grace Hopkinson Eliot Hall

- Location within Massachusetts Location within the United States
- Location: 51 Shepard Street, Cambridge, Massachusetts
- Coordinates: 42°22′51.8″N 71°7′24.5″W
- Built: 1907
- Architect: A.W. Longfellow
- Architectural style: Colonial Revival
- MPS: Cambridge MRA
- NRHP reference No.: 86001280
- Added to NRHP: May 19, 1986

Grace Hopkinson Eliot Hall, often called Eliot Hall, is a historic dormitory building on the Radcliffe Quadrangle of Harvard University in Cambridge, Massachusetts. The four story neo-Georgian brick building was built in 1907 to a design by Alexander Wadsworth Longfellow Jr. It is a duplicate of Bertram Hall, which is adjacent, except some of its architectural details were simplified to reduce costs. The house is named in honor of Grace Hopkinson Eliot, the wife of Harvard President Charles W. Eliot. The building is now one of the dormitories of Cabot House.

The building was listed on the National Register of Historic Places in 1986.

== See also ==
- National Register of Historic Places listings in Cambridge, Massachusetts
