= Justice Hopkins =

Justice Hopkins may refer to:

- Arthur F. Hopkins (1794–1865), associate justice of the Supreme Court of Alabama
- Richard Joseph Hopkins (1873–1943), associate justice of the Kansas Supreme Court
- Rufus Hopkins (1727–1809), associate justice of the Rhode Island Supreme Court
- Stephen Hopkins (politician) (1707–1785), chief justice of the Rhode Island Supreme Court
- William Hopkins (Rhode Island judge) (fl. 1740s–1750s), associate justice of the Rhode Island Supreme Court

== See also ==
- Judge Hopkins (disambiguation)
