= Richard Hopkins =

Richard Hopkins may refer to:

== Politicians ==
- Richard Hopkins (died 1682) (1612–1682), English politician who sat in the House of Commons in 1660
- Richard Hopkins (died 1708) (1641–1708), English politician who sat in the House of Commons variously between 1670 and 1701
- Richard Hopkins (died 1799) (1728–1799), MP for Dartmouth, Thetford, Queenborough and Harwich
- Sir Richard Hopkins (died 1736), MP for the City of London 1724–1727

== Others ==
- Dick Hopkins (born 1951), American college football coach
- Richard Hopkins (civil servant) (1880–1955), British civil servant
- Richard Joseph Hopkins (1873–1943), United States federal judge
- Richard Hopkins (TV producer) (1964–2012), British television producer
