= Peter Hopkins =

Peter Hopkins may refer to:

- Peter Hopkins (politician) (1826–1879), American lawyer and politician
- Peter Hopkins (geographer), British geographer
