= Jimmy Hopkins =

Fictional protagonist of the video game Bully

- Bully character
- In-game screenshot of Bully depicting Jimmy Hopkins.
- First appearance: Bully (2006)
- Designed by: Ian McQue
- Voiced by: Gerry Rosenthal

James "Jimmy" Hopkins is the player character of Bully, a 2006 video game developed by Rockstar Vancouver and published by Rockstar Games. He is a 15-year-old student sent to Bullworth Academy, a boarding school, after repeated expulsions. The player guides him through conflicts with the school's rival cliques and authorities.

Co-writer Dan Houser drew on his experiences at school when developing the game's premise. Houser wanted Jimmy to look tough without making him malicious; concept artist Ian McQue designed his appearance. Gerry Rosenthal voiced Jimmy and received an Interactive Achievement Award nomination for the performance.

Reviewers praised Jimmy's dialogue and underdog characterization, although his progression through repeated fights drew criticism. Academic criticism has examined how he gains power through acts of aggression and how players interpret the motives behind his actions. His optional same-sex kisses prompted contemporary discussion of LGBT representation and the game's age rating.

== Development and characterization ==
Jimmy Hopkins is characterized as a self-reliant teenager whose frequent changes of school had taught him to adapt and stand up for himself. According to Houser, an earlier designer had struggled to settle Jimmy's appearance and was subsequently replaced by Ian McQue, who had prior experience doing character designs and concept work for the Grand Theft Auto series. McQue produced Jimmy's character design in one evening. Houser described Jimmy's look as that of an early-1980s British thug transplanted to America, and wanted Jimmy to be tough but good-hearted. Environment artist Andrew Wood recalled that the animators wanted Jimmy's school fights to feel visceral, but had to avoid making violence between children excessive.

Gerry Rosenthal provided Jimmy's voice. He recalled in an interview with the New Jersey Stage that he was not a gamer and initially regarded the role as another acting job, but was surprised by fans' continued interest years later. His performance received a nomination for Outstanding Character Performance – Male at the tenth Interactive Achievement Awards in 2007.

== Appearances ==
In Bully and its expanded Scholarship Edition, fifteen-year-old Jimmy arrives at Bullworth after being expelled from several schools; his mother and her new husband leave him there while they take a year-long honeymoon cruise. As Jimmy, players can attend classes to obtain abilities and items, or break school rules and evade the prefects. They can also choose to have Jimmy court and kiss male or female students.

The game's narrative follows Jimmy as he befriends Gary Smith and Pete Kowalski, who, like him, are unaffiliated with the school's cliques. Jimmy earns the student factions' respect by defeating their leaders, while Gary conspires against him; their rivalry ends in a confrontation at the school bell tower.

== Reception and analysis ==
=== Critical reception ===
In his review of Bully, Jeremy Dunham of IGN found Jimmy's development as he navigated Bullworth's social hierarchy unexpectedly engaging, regarding his story as one of the best of the season. Jimmy's dialogue won praise from GameSpot's Jeff Gerstmann, who in his review for Bully described the character as street-smart and perceptive about the people around him.

Writing in Official Xbox Magazine, Sam Roberts contrasted Jimmy's good-hearted underdog role with the violent protagonists of Grand Theft Auto. He praised Jimmy's strong moral compass and wanted him to succeed because his mother and headmaster underestimated him, although he found Gary more interesting. In E-Learning, Aaron Chia-Yuan Hung found the sarcastic antihero easy to identify with, but felt that his growing attachment to power and popularity eventually inspired pity and fear. Hung criticized the limited alternatives to physical self-defense and the repetitive process through which Jimmy wins each clique's support by defeating its leader. Sean Cole of Retro Gamer compared his cynical outsider status to Holden Caulfield in The Catcher in the Rye: rebellious and distrustful of authority, but fundamentally good-natured.

Jimmy's optional kisses with male students attracted attention after release. Brendan Sinclair reported that the Entertainment Software Rating Board had considered the interactions when assigning the game its Teen rating, while attorney Jack Thompson complained to the board about their inclusion. Joystiq writer Alexander Sliwinski suggested Jimmy was bisexual or experimenting, and noted that kissing boys was optional. He argued that imposing a Mature rating over the kisses would make the controversy a civil rights issue. Bonnie Ruberg, also writing for Joystiq, appreciated the casual nature in which the game allows Jimmy to kiss other boys; Wired writer Eliza Gauger endorsed Ruberg's assessment that the gaming mainstream had largely accepted them despite a few objections. Interviewed by The Advocate, Jeb Havens, then-designer at 1st Playable Productions, welcomed making the kisses optional without special publicity and considered their inclusion a risk worth taking for Rockstar. Adrienne Shaw later observed that press accounts treated such content as exceptional despite its inclusion in earlier games.

In its December 2010 feature "The 30 Characters Who Defined a Decade", Game Informer contrasted Jimmy with conventional muscular action heroes in other video games, describing him as an angry, troubled adolescent whose concerns were comparatively ordinary. The magazine commended Rockstar for creating a protagonist who departed from established video game conventions and praised Jimmy's morally ambiguous characterization, observing that despite his juvenile delinquency, he instinctively defended students more vulnerable than himself. In 2013, Larry Hester of Complex ranked Jimmy among the "coolest" LGBT video game characters.

=== School hierarchy and violence ===
Gary Smith (right) whispers to Jimmy Hopkins in promotional artwork for Bully. Peter Rauch contrasted Gary's rumor-mongering and exploitation of paranoia with Jimmy's more direct use of confrontation.

Peter Rauch described Jimmy and Gary as outsiders who pursue power differently. Jimmy forms alliances to balance the cliques, while Gary provokes feuds with his rumors. Rauch attributed Jimmy's alliances to greed, self-defense or a desire for order; Jimmy relies on Pete's strategies for humiliating rivals but is slow to appreciate his friendship. Bullworth forbids violence, yet correcting its injustices requires Jimmy to break its rules. Rauch compared Jimmy with Ralph from Lord of the Flies, but found little resemblance beyond their desire for order: Jimmy usually fights to solve problems and does not look to adults for rescue. In Rauch's reading, the ending offers a fragile peace presumably sustained by the threat of Jimmy's violence.

Hung described Jimmy as a permanent outsider to Bullworth's cliques: neither winning their approval nor wearing their clothes makes him a member. Ian Bogost argued that Jimmy's peers draw him into trouble even when players try to avoid it; the game's rules make confrontation necessary to restore justice without presenting it as noble or desirable.

=== Player agency and representation ===
Rauch argued that optional actions shape players' understanding of Jimmy, with their preconceptions becoming more influential as they depart from the scripted story. Catherine Beavis and her coauthors compared him with an unreliable narrator: players supply meanings he does not necessarily understand. They described a tension between the need to act through Jimmy to progress and the parody that distances players from him.

Clare Bradford contrasted the limited account of Jimmy's thoughts with Caulfield's first-person narration. She argued that players can project motives onto him. In the mission involving the student Eunice's stolen chocolates, the player chooses how to recover them but cannot control the subsequent kiss or Jimmy's disdainful response. Players are complicit in his treatment of Eunice but are also invited to question it, in Bradford's reading. She read the kiss as a parody of female sexuality and the fear of femininity beneath hypermasculinity, or as a reminder of girls bullied outside the game. In Bradford's reading of the "Weed Killer" mission, Jimmy's disguise as a wealthy student admits him to a privileged space; the game's preference for him over the preppies challenges class divisions. Bradford concluded that the game argues against bullying because it penalizes attacks on weaker students and rewards their defense.

Anna Everett and S. Craig Watkins contrasted Jimmy with Carl "CJ" Johnson, the protagonist of Grand Theft Auto: San Andreas. They compared CJ's gun violence with Jimmy's use of fire extinguishers to put out fires at school: CJ conforms to stereotypes of violent black men, whereas Jimmy conforms to expectations of white male moral superiority and social responsibility despite his expulsions and abandonment.
