= William John Hopkinson =

William John Hopkinson (November 25, 1887 – February 21, 1970) was a Canadian artist best known for his en plein air style landscapes.

== Biography ==
Born in London, England, W.J. Hopkinson studied art there briefly but was mostly self-taught. Hopkinson came to Canada in 1912. He exhibited with the Royal Canadian Academy, the Ontario Society of Artists and the Nova Scotia Society of Artists. Although his talent was well respected and he went on painting trips with many leading painters, Hopkinson never achieved the same level of recognition as some of his contemporaries.

Hopkinson didn't become a full-time artist until late in life, in the late 1950s when he was in his late 60s.

Hopkinson worked mainly in oils, with landscapes of forests, winter scenes, and docked boats, but many pencil sketches have also survived. He painted from the 1930s until 1970, most often in the Aurora to Haliburton area of Ontario, Canada. He also painted scenes from trips to the Canadian East Coast, Alberta and British Columbia, and Massachusetts. He also made one trip back to his home country of England, but he only painted a handful of scenes in London.

Hopkinson was known to travel into the dense bush and forests in the Haliburton area and paint en plein air oil paintings on panels using palette knives, laying on thick layers of oil paint. This technique was suited to portraying the ruggedness of the landscape around him, showing fallen trees, forests and lakes under skies coloured in dramatic shades of blues, pinks and orange.

The artist taught at the St. Croix School of Art, New Brunswick, and at several centres in Ontario.

Hopkinson was honoured by the Ontario Society of Artists by having his painting "Town House" hung at the 70th annual spring exhibition being held at The Art Gallery of Toronto in 1942.

The actor Vincent Price was an admirer of Hopkinson's artworks, including his paintings in The Vincent Price Collection sold by Simpson's department store in Toronto and Chicago in 1965. Price even penned birthday wishes to Hopkinson on his 80th birthday in which Price called himself as a "longtime admirer of your beautiful paintings.

Hopkinson held his first one-man show of paintings at the Main Branch of The North York Public Library in the autumn of 1966 and subsequently at other library branches of North York that year.

The artist was most active in art circles in the Newmarket and Aurora area, northwest of Toronto. Hopkinson was a founder of the Newmarket Art Club, and member of the Willowdale Group of Artists and the Society of Co-operative Artists, Toronto.

After his death on February 21, 1970, a retrospective exhibit and sale was held. His friend and pupil, artist Isabelle Van Zant, did a portrait for the exhibition cover.
