= Samuel Hopkinson (cricketer) =

Australian cricketer

Personal information
- Born: 1 October 1825; Thorne, West Riding of Yorkshire, England
- Died: 26 June 1887 (aged 61); Melbourne, Australia

Domestic team information
- Years: Team
- 1861–1863: Victoria
- Source: Cricinfo, 3 May 2015

Samuel Hopkinson (1 October 1825 – 26 June 1887) was an Australian cricketer. He played two first-class cricket matches for Victoria between 1861 and 1863.

== See also ==
- List of Victoria first-class cricketers
