= Cleworth =

Cleworth is a surname, and may refer to:

- Duncan Cleworth (born 1957), British swimmer
- Harold Cleworth, British automotive artist
- Max Cleworth (born 2002), British footballer
- Ralph Cleworth (1896–1975), British lawyer and politician
