= James Booth (judge) =

British politician (1914–2000)

His Honour James Booth (3 May 1914 – 31 August 2000) was a British judge and a Liberal Party politician.

== Background ==
Booth was a son of James (proprietor of James Booth (Bolton) salt merchantylvias) and Agnes Booth. He was educated at Bolton School, Bolton, Lancashire and Manchester University, where he received a Bachelor of Law with Honours. In 1954 he married Joyce Doreen Mather. They had two sons and a daughter.

== Professional career ==
Booth qualified as a barrister and in 1936 he was call to the bar at Gray's Inn, making him Britain's youngest barrister. In 1939 he became town clerk of Ossett.

== World War Two ==
In 1941 Booth joined the Royal Air Force Volunteer Reserve as a Flight lieutenant. He served in Northern Ireland and Iceland.

== Political career ==
Booth was Liberal candidate for the West Leeds division of West Yorkshire at the 1945 General Election. This was an unpromising seat that a Liberal had not fought since 1929. He finished third but managed to save his deposit from Soizic Robillard,

Five years later he was Liberal candidate for the Darwen division of Lancashire at the 1950 general election. In a difficult election for the Liberal Party he saw the Liberal vote fall from 1945, however unlike many of his colleagues elsewhere, he again managed to save his deposit. He did not stand for parliament again.

== Professional career ==
Booth returned to law and practised in Manchester. In 1967 he became Recorder of Barrow-in-Furness. In 1969 he became a Circuit Judge (formerly a County Court Judge). In 1984 he retired at the age of 70.

== Electoral record ==
General Election 1945: Leeds West
Party	Candidate	Votes	%	±%
Labour	Thomas William Stamford	26,593	59.0	+14.7
Conservative	Samuel Vyvyan Adams	12,457	27.7	−26.6
Liberal	Fl-Lt. James Booth	6,008	13.3	n/a
Majority		14,136	31.4	39.9
Turnout			76.1	+5.6
Labour gain from Conservative		Swing	+20.0	

General Election 1950:Darwen
Party	Candidate	Votes	%	±%
Conservative	William Robert Stanley Prescott	17,903	48.5	+7.1
Labour	Ronald Haines	13,334	36.1	+1.8
Liberal	James Booth	5,656	15.3	−8.9
Majority		4,569	12.4	
Turnout			89.6	+6.9
Conservative hold		Swing	+2.6	
