= Community politics =

Community politics is a movement in British politics to re-engage people with political action on a local level.

Most developed amongst the Liberal Democrats but adopted to some extent by the British Greens, other parties, and Independents. An early example cited is the victory of Liberal Michael Meadowcroft in Leeds West, a traditionally safe Labour seat, in the 1983 general election.

Community politics is based on small-scale action on local political issues. To give an example of how it works: Residents are irritated by rubbish dumped by a playing field. A 'non-community' political response would be to issue a statement calling for more resources to be allocated to deal with dumped rubbish. A 'community politics' response would be for local councillors to lead a group of people to clear the rubbish themselves, then inform the local community through a newsletter.

The result is a stronger local community who feel that their representatives are achieving something, and a better chance of even the most under-resourced local authority taking the time to stop the problem in future.

The low-budget techniques are easy to adopt. No television advertising, mass direct mailing or contacts with national newspapers are necessary.

Community politics principles can be applied to any area and by any party. The keys are local action on residents' concerns and effective communication with local residents through newsletters and face-to-face contact. Parties which espouse community politics often meet with electoral success (e.g. the Liberal Democrats' ability to break out of the third-party trap), particularly in areas which have been dominated by one political party. In Letchworth Garden City local residents, disenchanted by local politics and the local establishment, petitioned for their own town council and elected all 24 members as independents. (All the seats had been contested by the main political parties).

== National and local initiatives ==
Concern at disengagement with local politics in the UK—manifested, not least, by low turnout in local elections - has led to a series of initiatives aimed at making it easier for people to become involved in local decision-making. Their success is debatable. Notable national initiatives include changes to electoral systems to allow universal postal voting on a trial basis, and the process introduced in the Local Government Act 2000 by which the public can, via petition, call for a referendum on whether there should be a local elected mayor. National regeneration funding streams, such as New Deal for Communities, require community leadership as part of their governance arrangements. At a local level, many local authorities have established "area", "ward" or "neighbourhood" committees and such like to consider more local, community based issues, sometimes with devolved budgets. The requirement placed on each local authority in England and Wales to create a Local Strategic Partnership is also intended to facilitate greater community involvement. There is also ongoing reform of the mechanisms for public and patient involvement in health issues. The Police and Justice Act 2006 and the 2006 local government white paper include processes for "Community Calls for Action", setting out statutory mechanisms by which local residents can formally bring issues of concern to the attention of their local authority and other public sector organisations.

== See also ==
- Community organizing
- Coproduction of public services by service users and communities
- National League of Young Liberals
- Peter Hain
- Participatory Democracy
