= John Murray (Liberal politician) =

Scottish civil servant

John Murray MP
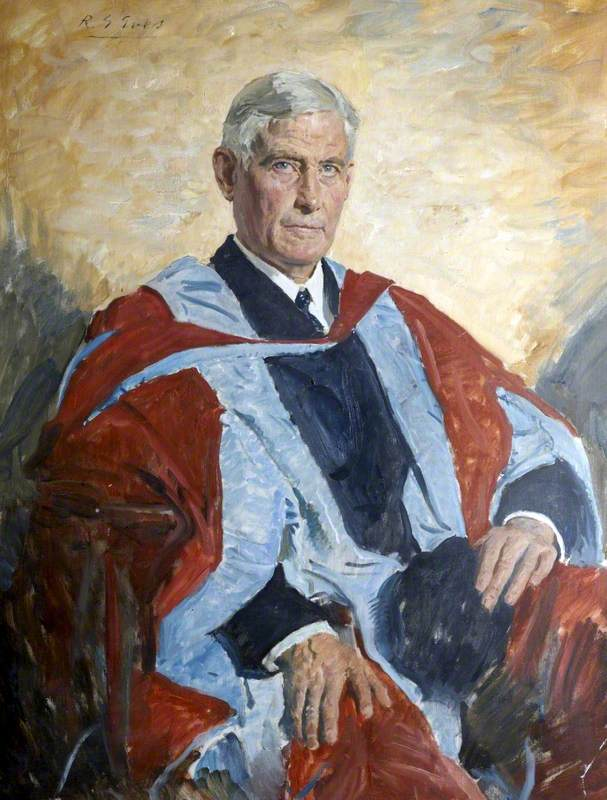
- Portrait of Murray as principal of University College of the South West of England by Reginald Eves (c.1935)
- Born: 28 February 1879; Fraserburgh, Aberdeenshire
- Died: 28 December 1964 (aged 85); London
- Education: Robert Gordon's College; University of Aberdeen (1900); Christ Church, Oxford (1905)
- Occupations: Politician; Civil servant; Academic administrator
- Political party: Liberal Party
- Spouse: Ellen Harwood (née Hopkinson)
- Relatives: Georgina Battiscombe (stepdaughter); Alfred Hopkinson (father-in-law)

Principal of University College of the South West of England
- In office 1926–1951
- Preceded by: Sir Walter Hamilton Moberly
- Succeeded by: Sir Thomas Taylor

Member of Parliament for Leeds West
- In office 1918–1923
- Preceded by: Edmund Harvey
- Succeeded by: Thomas Stamford

John Murray (28 February 1879 – 28 December 1964) was a Scottish civil servant, university administrator and Liberal Party politician.

== Family and education ==
Murray was born in Fraserburgh in Aberdeenshire, the eldest son of Francis Robert Murray, a Fraserburgh fish curer, and his wife Isabella (née Watt). He was educated at Robert Gordon's College in Aberdeen. He then attended the University of Aberdeen where he obtained an MA degree in Greek and Latin. He also studied at Christ Church, Oxford and was a Prize Fellow of Merton College, Oxford in 1905. In 1908 he was Student and Keeper of Christ Church. In 1921 he married Ellen, the widow of George Harwood formerly Liberal MP for Bolton.

== Career ==
From 1910 to 1915, Murray was Censor of Christ Church, Oxford – that is an assistant to the Dean with responsibility for undergraduate discipline. In 1915 the Ministry of Munitions was established under the leadership of David Lloyd George and Murray went to work in the Labour Regulation Department on matters of industrial relations. He also held a position as officer in charge of a section of the Board of Education which considered the grant of university awards to former servicemen. From 1920 to 1921 he was Chairman of the Central Committee established under the Profiteering Acts to investigate and report on price increases.

After his Parliamentary career, Murray entered a new area of public life. He was Principal of the University College of the South West of England from 1926 to 1951. He also served on the Consultative Committee for Independent Education. His professional interest in education led him to accept a number of governorships of schools including Bryanston School, St Martin-in-the-Fields High School for Girls and Gordonstoun School. Murray also served as a member of a committee on higher education in east Africa in 1936–7 chaired by Earl De La Warr, parliamentary under-secretary at the Colonial Office. As a committed Christian, Murray dissented from some of the committee's conclusions and wrote a minority report opposing secular education.

== Honorary degrees ==
In recognition of his public services, Murray received the honorary degrees of Doctor of Laws from Aberdeen University, and Doctor of Letters from Columbia University in New York City and Exeter University.

== Politics ==
=== West Leeds ===
==== 1918 ====
Murray was chosen as Liberal candidate for Leeds West at the 1918 general election. He was a recipient of the Coalition coupon and won easily in a four-cornered contest against Labour and Independent opponents with a majority of 6,622 votes.

==== 1922 ====
At the 1922 general election, Murray, again selected as the Liberal candidate, had a straight fight against the Labour candidate Thomas Stamford. In a much tighter contest, Murray narrowly held on to his seat by the margin of 904 votes.

==== 1923 ====
The 1923 general election saw the re-intervention of the Conservatives at West Leeds and with the anti-Labour vote effectively split, Stamford emerged as the winner for Labour over the Tories, with Murray relegated to bottom of the poll.

=== Kirkcaldy ===
For the general election of 1924, Murray switched to a seat in his native Scotland. He contested the Kirkcaldy District of Burghs constituency. However, in a straight fight with the sitting Labour MP Tom Kennedy one of the Labour whips, he trailed by a majority of 2,284 votes.

=== Ripon ===
Murray made a final effort to re-enter the House of Commons in 1925 when he was chosen to contest the Ripon by-election. This by-election was caused by the resignation of the sitting Tory MP, Edward Wood who had been selected to become Viceroy of India on the personal invitation of the King and Prime Minister Stanley Baldwin, albeit after the post had been turned down by Earl Haig amongst others. In a straight fight with the new Conservative candidate John Waller Hills, Murray was defeated by a majority of 5,011 votes.

=== Political views ===
Murray seems to have followed a well-worn path from radical opinion in his early political career to more conservative views in later life. He took a sympathetic line in Parliament towards the treatment of the unemployed and became an early supporter of family allowances, a policy he championed throughout his life. At the time of Liberal reunion in 1923, Murray stated that the "true place for Liberalism is on the left." However he later appears to have lost his faith in the role of the state. He was associated with Ernest Benn and his Society for Individual Freedom. During the Ripon by-election Murray openly disagreed with Lloyd George's plans for nationalisation of land and the coal industry.

== Death ==
Murray died in London on 28 December 1964 at the age of 85 years.

Parliament of the United Kingdom
Preceded by Thomas Edmund Harvey	Member of Parliament for Leeds West; 1918 – 1923	Succeeded by Thomas William Stamford
Academic offices
Preceded by Walter Moberly	Principal of the University College of the South West; 1926-1951	Succeeded by Thomas Taylor
