= 1949 Leeds West by-election =

UK parliamentary by-election

A by-election for the constituency of Leeds West in the United Kingdom House of Commons was held on 21 July 1949, caused by the suicide of the incumbent Labour MP Thomas Stamford. The result was a hold for the Labour Party, with their candidate Charles Pannell.

== Result ==
Leeds West by-election 1949: Leeds West
| Party | Candidate | Votes | % | ±% |
|---|---|---|---|---|
| Labour | Charles Pannell | 21,935 | 55.2 | −3.8 |
| Conservative | Bernard Mather | 17,826 | 44.8 | +17.1 |
| Majority | | 4,109 | 10.4 | −20.9 |
| Turnout | | 39,761 | | |
| Labour hold | | Swing | | |

== Previous election ==
General election 1945: Leeds West
| Party | Candidate | Votes | % | ±% |
|---|---|---|---|---|
| Labour | Thomas Stamford | 26,593 | 59.0 | +14.3 |
| Conservative | Vyvyan Adams | 12,457 | 27.7 | −26.6 |
| Liberal | J Booth | 6,008 | 13.3 | New |
| Majority | | 14,136 | 31.3 | N/A |
| Turnout | | 45,058 | 76.1 | +5.6 |
| Labour gain from Conservative | | Swing | | |
