= 1925 Ripon by-election =

UK parliamentary by-election

The 1925 Ripon by-election was a parliamentary by-election held on 5 December 1925 for the British House of Commons constituency of Ripon.

== Vacancy ==
The by-election was a consequence of the sitting MP Edward Wood – later the 3rd Viscount Halifax and the 1st Earl of Halifax – being elevated to the peerage as Baron Irwin in order to serve as Viceroy of India.

== Election history ==
Wood had served Ripon as a Conservative since 1910; he had been returned unopposed at every election since 1918.

== Candidates ==
Two candidates were nominated. The Conservative candidate was John Waller Hills, who had represented the City of Durham until he was defeated in the 1922 general election. He was opposed in the by-election by the Liberal candidate John Murray, another former MP who had lost his seat in the 1923 general election in Leeds West. Murray had subsequently fought unsuccessfully in the Kirkcaldy Burghs constituency in the 1924 general election. There was no Labour candidate.

== Main issues and campaign ==
During the campaign Murray openly disagreed with his own leader Lloyd George's plans for nationalization of land and the coal industry.

== Result ==
The Conservatives held the seat;

Ripon by-election, 1925 Electorate 37,338
Party	Candidate	Votes	%	±%
Conservative	John Waller Hills	16,433	59.0	N/A
Liberal	John Murray	11,422	41.0	New
Majority		5,011	18.0	N/A
Turnout		27,855	74.6	N/A
Conservative hold		Swing		

== Aftermath ==
Murray did not again stand for parliament, while Hills sought to defend Ripon at the following general election. The result at the following general election:

1929 general election Electorate 55,191
Party	Candidate	Votes	%	±%
Conservative	John Waller Hills	23,173	55.1	N/A
Liberal	Frederick L Boult	14,542	34.6	N/A
Labour	Arthur Godfrey	4,339	10.3	New
Majority		8,631	20.5	N/A
Turnout		42,054	76.2	N/A
Conservative hold		Swing		

Hills was to remain MP for Ripon until his death in 1939.
