= James Wilfred Cook =

English chemist

Sir James Wilfred Cook FRS FRSE
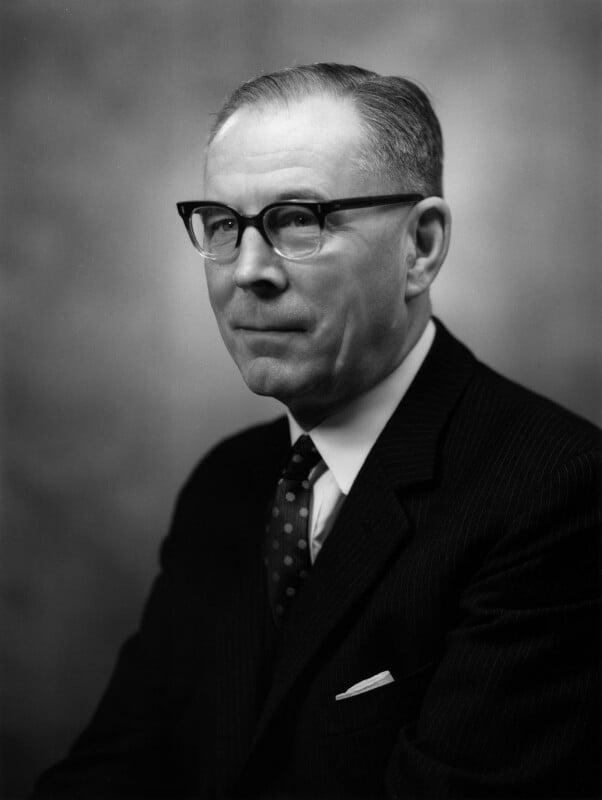
- Born: 10 December 1900; South Kensington, London
- Died: 21 October 1975 (aged 74); Budleigh Salterton, Devon
- Education: University College, London (BSc); University of London (MSc, PhD, DSc)
- Known for: Cancer research and career in university administration
- Board member of: Association of Commonwealth Universities; National Council for Technological Awards; Council for National Academic Awards
- Spouse(s): Elsie Winifred Griffith (m. 1930; died 1966) Vera Elizabeth Ford (m. 1967)
- Awards: Knight Bachelor (1963); Davy Medal (1954); Officer of the Order of Leopold (Belgium) (1937)
- Scientific career
- Fields: Pathological chemistry
- Workplaces: Sir John Cass Technical Institute; Department of Scientific and Industrial Research (Chemical Research Laboratory); The Institute of Cancer Research; University of Glasgow; University of Exeter
- Doctoral students: Geoffrey Badger

Vice-chancellor of University of East Africa
- In office 1966–1970
- Preceded by: Sir Bernard de Bunsen
- Succeeded by: post abolished

Vice-chancellor of University of Exeter ^{a}
- In office 1955–1965
- Preceded by: post established
- Succeeded by: Sir John Llewellyn

Principal of University College of the South West of England ^{a}
- In office 1954–1955
- Preceded by: Sir Thomas Taylor
- Succeeded by: post abolished

President of Royal Institute of Chemistry
- In office 1949–1951

Notes
- ^{a} University College of the South West of England received royal charter to become University of Exeter in 1955.

Sir James Wilfred Cook FRS FRSE DSc LLD (1900–1975) was an English chemist, best known for his research of organic chemistry of carcinogenic compounds. Friends knew him simply as Jim Cook.

== Early life ==
He was born in South Kensington in London on 10 December 1900, the son of Charles William Cook, a coachman, and his wife, Frances Wall. A recipient of London County Council's junior scholarship, he attended Sloane School in Chelsea, London.

== Academic career ==
In 1917, having been awarded a senior scholarship by London County Council, Cook started a Chemistry with Physics degree at University College London, where he was taught by Frederick G. Donnan, Norman Collie, as well as the Nobel laureate Sir William Bragg. As an undergraduate, he was awarded the Tufnell Scholarship as well as multiple prize certificates in Chemistry exams.

In 1920, having earned his BSc, Cook began lecturing at the Sir John Cass Technical Institute (now part of London Metropolitan University). At the same time, he registered as a graduate student at the University of London, going on to obtain an MSc (1921), a PhD (1923), and a DSc (1925). Cook's PhD thesis was on the Anthracene derivative. He lectured at Sir John Cass Technical Institute until 1928.

After leaving his lectureship, Cook briefly worked at the Chemical Research Laboratory in the Department of Scientific and Industrial Research, part of the civil service. In 1929, Ernest Kennaway invited him to work at the Royal Cancer Hospital, where he remained until 1939. Research done at the hospital suggested that tar (as found in most cigarettes) contained carcinogenic components of a similar structure to anthracene. Cook gathered pure samples of many polycyclic aromatic hydrocarbons, such as 1,2,5,6-dibenzoantracene, benzofenantrene 3.4-and 3.4-benzopyrene, and was therefore able to demonstrate for the first time that even a minute amount of pure chemical compound had carcinogenic properties. One of the doctoral students he supervised during his time at the Royal Cancer Hospital was Geoffrey Badger, who would later work with Cook as a postdoctoral researcher at University of Glasgow.

In 1939 he moved to Glasgow University as Regius Professor of Chemistry and Director of their chemical laboratories. He remained interested in carcinogenic compounds, but his focus now looked at compounds of natural origin. Central to his research was the clarification of the structure of Alkaloid Colchicine: a compound that has anti-cancer properties, but is also highly toxic. Searching for parallel but less toxic compounds, similar to colchicine, he synthesized and studied many artificially created compounds.

In 1954 Cook was appointed head of the University College of the South West of England, which in 1955 was renamed the University of Exeter, with Cook then as Vice Chancellor. He continued to collaborate on research on polycyclic aromatic compounds with carcinogenic properties, isolated from crude oil and tobacco smoke.

In 1965 he retired from the University of Exeter. Shortly afterwards his wife died, and Cook then decided to move to East Africa. In 1966 he became Vice Chancellor of the University of East Africa, which included colleges located in Kampala, Nairobi and Dar es Salaam. In 1970, the University of East Africa split to create three independent universities: Makerere University in Kampala (Uganda), the University of Nairobi (Kenya) and the University of Dar es Salaam (Tanzania).

Throughout his career, the scientific production of Cook includes about 240 articles in specialised journals.

Some of his notable committee memberships and positions throughout his career were:

- President of the Royal Institute of Chemistry, 1949–51
- University Grants Committee, 1950–54
- Committee on the Cost of the National Health Service, 1956–59
- Advisory Committee on Pesticides and Other Toxic Chemicals, 1962–66

== Honours and recognitions ==
Cook was elected to Fellowship of the Royal Society of London in 1938. He was elected as Fellow of the Royal Society of Edinburgh in 1940, with his candidacy backed by John Walton, Edward Taylor Jones, Thomas Murray MacRobert, Edward Hindle, and James Kendall. He later resigned from this fellowship in 1953.

Among the various honours, in 1954 Cook won the highly prestigious Davy Medal, awarded by the Royal Society of London. Cook was knighted by Queen Elizabeth II as part of the 1963 New Year Honours for his "services to Organic Chemistry". His international recognition includes co-winning an award from the Union for International Cancer Control with Ernest Kennaway in 1936, and being made an Officer of the Order of Leopold (Belgium) in 1937. Between 1936 and 1952, Cook was nominated for the Nobel Prize in Chemistry four times and for the Nobel Prize in Physiology or Medicine six times, though none of these nominations resulted in him winning.

Cook was made a fellow of University College London in 1950. He also received multiple honorary doctorates from universities in the UK and abroad, including:

- Dublin – DSc (1948)
- University of Rennes (1960)
- Nigeria – DSc (1961)
- Exeter – LLD (1967)
- Ulster – DSc (1970)

== Family ==
Cook married twice. Firstly, in 1930 he married Elsie Winifred Griffith, with whom he had three sons. Following her death in 1966 he remarried the following year to Vera Elizabeth Ford, a biology teacher.

In 1970 he returned to England, living in Budleigh Salterton, Devon. He died suddenly on 21 October 1975.

Academic offices
Preceded by Thomas Taylor	Principal of the University College of the South West; 1954-1955	Succeeded by Vice-Chancellor of the University of Exeter
Preceded by Principal of the University College of the South West	Vice-Chancellor of the University of Exeter; 1955-1966	Succeeded by John Llewellyn
Preceded by unknown	Vice-Chancellor of the University of East Africa; 1966-1970	Succeeded by unknown
