= Thomas Taylor (chemist) =

English chemist, academic and university administrator (1895–1953)

Sir Thomas Taylor CBE
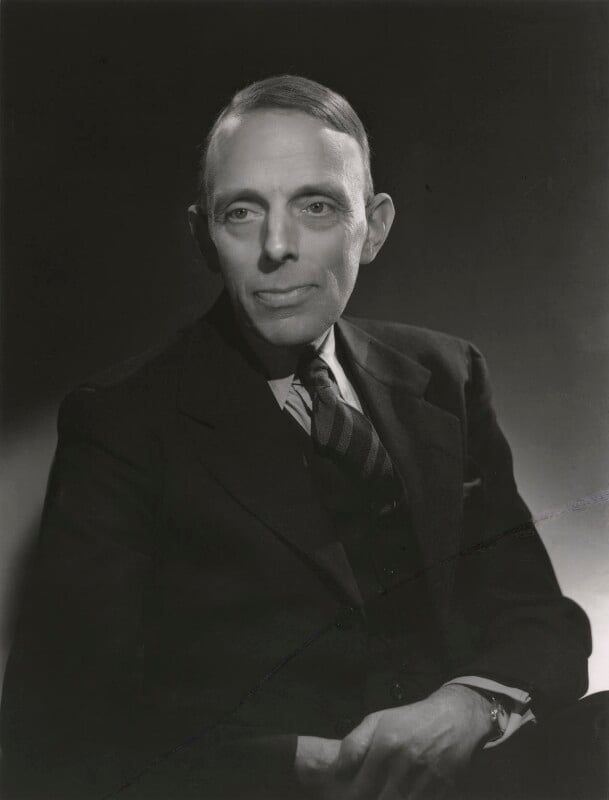
- Taylor in 1946

Principal of the University College of the South West of England
- In office 1952–1953
- Preceded by: John Murray
- Succeeded by: Sir James Cook

1st Principal of the University College of the West Indies
- In office 1946–1952
- Preceded by: First incumbent
- Succeeded by: W.W. Grave

Personal details
- Born: Thomas Weston Johns Taylor; 2 October 1895 Little Ilford, Essex, England
- Died: 29 August 1953 (aged 57) Milan, Italy
- Spouse: Rosamund Georgina (m. 1922)
- Education: City of London School
- Alma mater: Brasenose College, Oxford, (BA); Oxford University (DSc)

Military service
- Allegiance: United Kingdom
- Branch/service: British Army
- Years of service: 1915–1919; 1940–1946
- Rank: Major
- Unit: Essex Regiment; Royal Engineers
- Battles/wars: First World War; Western Front; Gallipoli Campaign; Second World War
- Scientific career
- Awards: Medal of Freedom with Bronze Palm (1948)
- Fields: Organic chemistry, Botany
- Workplaces: University of Oxford
- Academic advisors: Frederick Daniel Chattaway
- Notable students: Rosemary Murray; William Golding

Sir Thomas Weston Johns Taylor, CBE (2 October 1895 – 29 August 1953) was an English chemist, academic, and university administrator.

He was the first Principal of the University College of the West Indies, serving from 1946 to 1952, and then Principal of the University College of the South West of England (later Exeter University) from 1952 until his death in 1953. He had previously been a Fellow of Brasenose College, Oxford (1920–1946) and a lecturer in organic chemistry at the University of Oxford (1927–1946). He saw active service in the British Army during both World Wars.

== Early life and education ==
Taylor was born on 2 October 1895 in Little Ilford, Essex, England. He was educated at the City of London School, an all-boys private school in London. Having received a scholarship, he studied chemistry at Brasenose College, Oxford, where he was taught by Frederick Daniel Chattaway. His university studies were interrupted by military service during the First World War. He returned to Oxford after the war, and graduated with a first class Bachelor of Arts (BA) degree in 1920. He was later awarded a Doctor of Science (DSc) degree by the University of Oxford.

== Military service ==
=== First World War ===
On 20 April 1915, having trained with the Officers Training Corps, Taylor was commissioned into the Essex Regiment as a second lieutenant (on probation). He was assigned to the 3rd Battalion, Essex Regiment. His commission and rank were confirmed in September 1915. He saw active service on the Western Front in France, and also at Gallipoli. He was wounded twice at Gallipoli.

=== Second World War ===
When the Second World War broke out, Taylor returned to the British Army, and was commissioned as a lieutenant on 14 January 1940. On 12 January 1941, he was assigned to the Royal Engineers and promoted to war substantive captain. He served in its chemical warfare branch, and was posted to the Middle East until 1943. While a temporary major, he was mentioned in despatches "in recognition of gallant and distinguished services in the Middle East during the period November 1941 to April 1942".

In 1943, Taylor moved to the United States where he had been appointed Director of the British Central Scientific Office (BCSO) in Washington, DC. The role of the BCSO was to undertake varied scientific research in relation to the war, and to cooperate with American scientists. He undertook research as varied as insecticides, paper parachutes, and shark repellents. Then, from 1944 to the end of the war, he was assigned to South East Asia Command as Head of the Operational Research Division.

== Academic career ==
In 1920, Taylor was elected a Fellow of Brasenose College, Oxford; his alma mater. In 1927, he was additionally appointed a lecturer in organic chemistry at the University of Oxford. As a researcher he specialised in stereochemistry, but made his name as an excellent teacher. He was a demonstrator in organic chemistry at the Dyson Perrins Laboratory. Among his students at Brasenose College was William Golding, who would move from studying science to literature and later won the Nobel Prize in Literature. Among those he supervised at Dyson Perrins Laboratory was Rosemary Murray; later Dame Rosemary and Vice-Chancellor of the University of Cambridge.

In 1931, Taylor was awarded a Rhodes Travelling Fellowship, which took him to the United States and Canada. In 1938, he took a sabbatical year to go on an expedition to the Galapagos, joined by zoologist David Lack and filmmaker Richard Leacock, among others. His wife, Georgina Lloyd Taylor, accompanied him on the expedition and kept a diary of the experience. His research from the trip, Plant Pigments in the Galapagos Islands, was written up and presented to the Royal Society in 1940.

Taylor was a member of the Chemical Society and served on its council from 1936 to 1939.

Following the end of the Second World War, Taylor moved into academic administration: he had learnt during the war that he was a very capable administrator. In 1946, he was selected as the first Principal of the University College of the West Indies in Jamaica. His duties involved building up the university college, establishing it in a difficult political climate, and solidifying its finances. He was successful, and was knighted for his efforts in 1952. He left the Caribbean to return to England, where he had been appointed Principal of the University College of the South West of England (later to become the University of Exeter) in July 1952.

== Honours ==
On 23 May 1946, Taylor was appointed a Commander of the Order of the British Empire (CBE) "for services to the forces". In 1948, he was awarded a Medal of Freedom with Bronze Palm by the United States government for his work in scientific research and development. In the 1952 Queen's Birthday Honours, he was appointed a Knight Bachelor, and therefore granted the title sir, in recognition of his work as Principal of the University College of the West Indies. He was knighted by Queen Elizabeth II during a service at Buckingham Palace on 8 July 1952.

== Personal life ==
In 1922, Taylor married Rosamund Georgina Lloyd, later known as Lady Taylor. They had no children.

On 29 August 1953, Taylor died suddenly while on holiday in Milan, Italy: he was 57 years old.

== Selected works ==
=== Text books ===
- Sidgwick, Nevil; Taylor, T. W. J.; Baker, Wilson (1937). The Organic Chemistry of Nitrogen (2nd ed.). Oxford: Clarendon Press.
- Richter, Victor von; Anschütz, Richard (1939). Taylor, T. W. J.; Millidge, A. F. (eds.). Organic chemistry; or, Chemistry of the carbon compounds. Vol. II - The Alicyclic Compounds and Natural Products. Nordemann.

=== Papers in academic journals ===
- Murray, A. R.; Taylor, T. W. J. (1937). "300. The αα′-dicyclohexylsuccinic acids". J. Chem. Soc.: 1450–1453. doi:10.1039/JR9370001450. ISSN 0368-1769.
- Taylor, T. W. J.; Murray, A. R. (1938). "395. Isomeric change in certain stilbenes". Journal of the Chemical Society (Resumed): 2078. doi:10.1039/jr9380002078. ISSN 0368-1769.
- Taylor, T. W. J. (1940). "Plant Pigments in the Galapagos Islands". Proceedings of the Royal Society of London. Series B, Biological Sciences. 129 (855): 230–237. ISSN 0080-4649.
- Taylor, T. W. J. (1951). "The University College of the West Indies". Caribbean Quarterly. 2 (1): 4–15. doi:10.1080/00086495.1951.11829348. ISSN 0008-6495.

Academic offices
| Preceded by unknown | Principal of the University College of the West Indies; 1946-1952 | Succeeded by unknown |
| Preceded by John Murray | Principal of the University College of the South West; 1952-1953 | Succeeded by Sir James Cook |
