= Ken Eberts =

American painter (1943–2024)

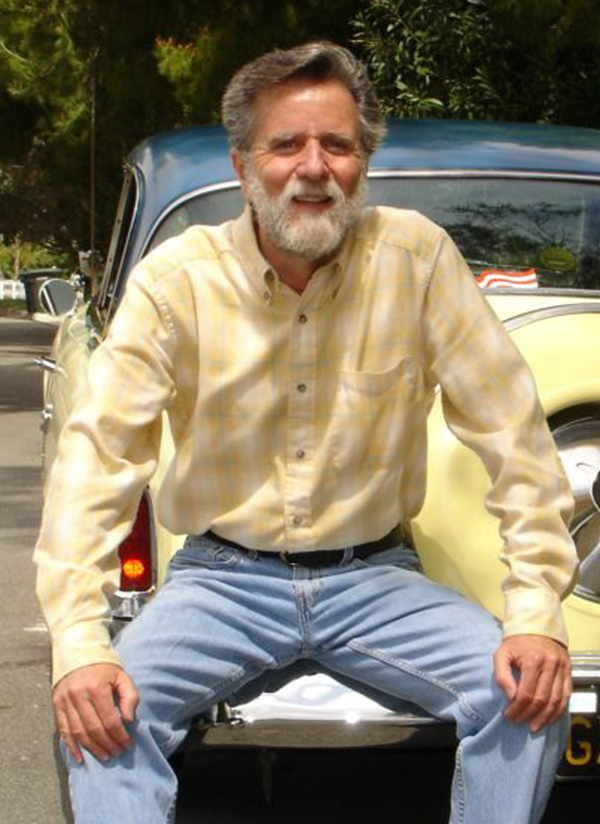
- Ken Eberts, c. 2015
- Born: July 4, 1943; New York City
- Died: August 14, 2024
- Education: Art Center College of Design (CA)
- Known for: Founder of Automotive Fine Arts Society
- Notable work: Dad's Home; California Pit Stop; Elegant Performance
- Style: Automotive art
- Elected: president of AFAS
- Website: www.autoartgallery.com

Ken Eberts (July 4, 1943 - August 14, 2024) was an American painter who had been a major contributor to the automotive art genre. He was a founding member of the Automotive Fine Arts Society (AFAS), and was its president since its inception in 1983.

More than 1200 of his original paintings hang in the homes and galleries of art collectors around the world. The best known of his works include "Dad's Home" and "California Pit Stop". Eberts has created the principal posters for seven of the Pebble Beach Concours d'Elegance. In 2003, he was named Ford Motor Company's official Centennial Artist, following Norman Rockwell who had been Ford's 50th Anniversary artist in 1953.

== Early life ==
Ken Eberts was raised in the Bronx, New York City, by his parents Charles J. Eberts and Renee Eberts, née Sternberg. By his teenage years, Eberts drew constantly. Eberts graduated from the High School of Music and Art in New York City. He was encouraged in this by his Scottish grandmother, an amateur fine artist. Eberts' favorite artists were Norman Rockwell and Andrew Wyeth, but he was also drawn to movies of the 1930s and 1940s that featured automobiles and street scenes. In college, he designed and built a full size fiberglass sports car. He graduated from the Art Center College of Design in Pasadena, California.

In 1965, Eberts was recruited by the Ford Motor Company in Dearborn, Michigan. He joined the design team responsible for the Mercury Cougar, Ford LTD and Galaxie, the 2nd generation Ford Econoline van and the Lincoln Continental Mark III. In 1966, Lockheed Aircraft hired him to join their design team for the L-1011 airliner.

== Fine art and automotive art ==
After quitting Lockheed, he gave himself 5 years to see if he could sustain himself painting. He married in 1972. Eberts's work was being shown as "Americana" at galleries and shows. He developed his technique in watercolors and gouache on smoothly textured illustration board. The unusual combination of techniques allowed him to capture the full detail of glass, chrome and leather.

In 1981, he showed his work at the Meadow Brook Concours d'Elegance. Here he met five other artists specializing in automotive subjects. They decided to start an organization to promote recognition of a new genre: "automotive art." The name of the organization became the Automotive Fine Art Society (AFAS). The organization's goal is to raise the standards of automotive art to a level of acceptance as serious fine from the perspective of collectors and critics. Since 1986, an 8000 sq. ft. exhibit area presents member works as attendees enter the Pebble Beach Concours d'Elegance. In addition to its annual presence for 30 years in Pebble Beach, the AFAS is also a mainstay presenter at the Amelia Island Concours d'Elegance in Amelia Island, Fla. AFAS has also exhibited at the Goodwood Revival and numerous museums.

=== Career awards and recognition ===
Eberts produced the show posters for the AACA National Fall Meet at Hershey, PA for 20 consecutive years, from 1996 to 2016. Eberts has created the principal posters for 7 of the Pebble Beach Concours d 'Elegance events. He has mounted over 30 one-artist shows. 50 of his paintings reside in the permanent collection of the Bank of America. Additional works are in the Petersen Automotive Museum (Los Angeles) and the Crawford Auto-Aviation Museum (Cleveland).

In 2003, Eberts was named Ford Motor Company's official Centennial Artist, following Norman Rockwell who had been Ford's 50th Anniversary artist in 1953.

In 2013, William Jeanes, former editor in chief of "Car & Driver" described Ken Eberts paintings:

"Ken's realistic, highly detailed technique creates scenes of America's past that.. somehow become a part of one's own past. His work... has a deja vu quality."

At the 2016 Pebble Beach Concours d'Elegance he won The Lincoln Motor Car company award, awarded for the most elegant artwork. His work showed the three Ford GT40s that formed the team that won 24 Hours of Le Mans in 1966.
