= John Battle (politician) =

British politician (born 1951)

The Right Honourable Sir John Battle KC*SG
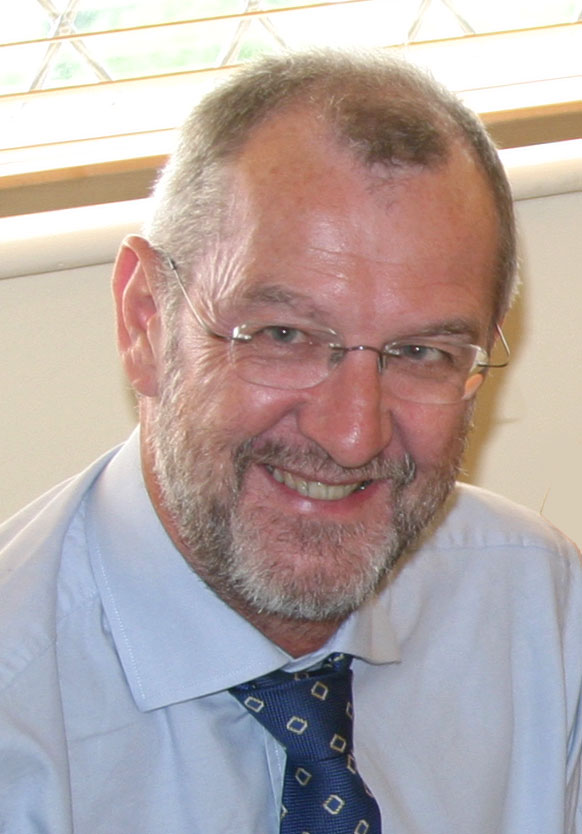
- Battle in 2005

Minister of State for Foreign and Commonwealth Affairs
- In office 28 July 1999 – 11 June 2001
- Prime Minister: Tony Blair
- Preceded by: Tony Lloyd
- Succeeded by: The Baroness Symons

Minister of State for Trade and Industry
- In office 5 May 1997 – 28 July 1999
- Prime Minister: Tony Blair
- Preceded by: Peter Fraser
- Succeeded by: Helen Liddell

Member of Parliament for Leeds West
- In office 12 June 1987 – 12 April 2010
- Preceded by: Michael Meadowcroft
- Succeeded by: Rachel Reeves

Leeds City Councillor for Hunslet Ward
- In office 1980–1991
- Preceded by: Ward created
- Succeeded by: Ian Hugill

Personal details
- Born: John Dominic Battle; 26 April 1951 (age 75) Bradford, West Riding of Yorkshire, England
- Party: Labour
- Spouse: Mary Meenan
- Children: 3
- Education: University of Leeds

Sir John Dominic Battle, KC*SG (born 26 April 1951) is a British politician who served as the Member of Parliament (MP) for Leeds West from 1987 to 2010. A member of the Labour Party, he served in government as Minister of State for Trade and Industry (1997–1999) and Minister of State for Foreign and Commonwealth Affairs (1999–2001) under Tony Blair.

== Early life ==
Sir John was born in Bradford and educated at St Paulinus' School, a primary school in Dewsbury; St Michael's College, Underley Hall 1962–1967 (a junior seminary – secondary education – for the training of priests at the Roman Catholic Archdiocese of Liverpool), and at St Joseph's College, Up Holland (1967–1972). Following a year of work, he went to the University of Leeds where he graduated with a bachelor's degree in English in 1976. From 1976 to 1979, he undertook postgraduate research.

In 1979, he began to work as a research assistant to Derek Enright, a fellow Catholic and a Member of the European Parliament. Sir John gained a seat on the City of Leeds Council in 1980. He chaired the innovative Industry and Employment Committee and later the Housing Committee.

He was chosen to contest the Conservative seat of Leeds North West at the 1983 general election. Donald Kaberry, the Conservative MP since the seat's creation in 1955, was retiring. Sir John lost to a sitting MP in Keith Hampson, whose own seat of Ripon had been abolished.

Sir John became the national coordinator for Church Action on Poverty in 1983 and in 1986, was selected to contest the seat of Leeds West, which had seen a shock result at the previous general election. Joseph Dean had been comfortably re-elected as the Labour MP for Leeds West at the 1979 general election, with a majority of over 10,000 votes. However, in 1983 he was defeated by the Liberal candidate Michael Meadowcroft against all predictions; as Leeds West had been held Labour since 1945.

== Parliamentary career ==
Against the national swing, Sir John won fairly easily and regained the Leeds West constituency for Labour. Meadowcroft only served one term in Parliament.

Within a year of entering the House of Commons, Sir John was promoted to the Opposition Whip's Office by Neil Kinnock in 1988, but resigned in protest at Labour's support for the Major ministry over the 1991 Gulf War. After the 1992 general election, he joined the frontbench of the new Labour Party leader, John Smith as a spokesman on Housing. Following Smith's death and the election of Tony Blair as Leader of the Labour Party in 1994, Sir John was moved in a reshuffle to the position of Spokesman on Science and Technology. In 1995, he was moved again; this time to the position of Spokesman on Energy.

Following the 1997 general election, Sir John entered the government becoming Minister of State at the Department of Trade and Industry with responsibility for Science, Energy and Industry, announcing the decommissioning of the nuclear power station at Dounreay in 1998. In 1999, he moved sideways to the Foreign and Commonwealth Office, but was dropped from government after the 2001 general election. Subsequently, he served on the International Development Committee. In 2002, Sir John became a Member of the Privy Council and was the Prime Minister's envoy to all the faith communities until May 2010.

== Affiliations ==
Sir John is a Fellow of Blackfriars Hall, University of Oxford, and a patron of the International Young Leaders Network and of the St Vincent de Paul Society of England and Wales. He serves as Pro-chancellor of Leeds Trinity University.

== Bramley Baths ==
Following proposals by Leeds City Council in 2011 to reduce opening hours at Bramley Baths amid wider budget cuts, John Battle became a leading figure in the community campaign to preserve the historic Edwardian swimming baths. He chaired the Friends of Bramley Baths steering group, which was established to oppose the potential closure of the facility and develop a community-led alternative for its operation.

Under Battle’s leadership, the campaign worked with local residents, volunteers and community organisations to secure the transfer of the baths from council management into community ownership. In May 2012, Leeds City Council approved a 25-year lease allowing the Friends of Bramley Baths to operate the facility as a community enterprise. The baths formally transferred to community management on 1 January 2013.

Battle subsequently served as chair of the organisation overseeing Bramley Baths for several years. During this period, the baths transitioned from operating at a financial loss to generating a surplus, expanded opening hours, and became widely cited as an example of successful community asset transfer and social enterprise management.

He stepped down as chair in 2021 after more than a decade of involvement with the organisation, which saw Bramley Baths become a secure social enterprise with shareholders and a Board of Trustees. The 'John Battle Swimming Gala' runs annually from Bramley Baths where children take part in friendly competition whilst learning to swim.

== Personal life ==
Battle's brother Jim in 2015

He married Mary Meenan in 1977, who is of Irish Catholic extraction and who was a Mathematics researcher at the University of Leeds, where they met at the University Catholic chaplaincy. They have a son (born ca. 1980) and two daughters.

His brother Jim Battle is also a politician and served as deputy leader of Manchester City Council from 2004 to 2013 and deputy Greater Manchester Police and Crime Commissioner under Tony Lloyd. His niece Rosa Battle is also a councillor.

== Honours ==
On 27 June 2009, Sir John was invested as a Knight Commander with Star of the Order of St Gregory the Great (KC*SG) by Pope Benedict XVI, in recognition of lifelong commitment and loyalty to the local Church and for Sir John's political contribution as a Member of Parliament.

Sir John was knighted in the 2022 New Year Honours for political and public service.

Parliament of the United Kingdom
Preceded by Michael Meadowcroft	Member of Parliament for Leeds West; 1987–2010	Succeeded by Rachel Reeves
