= Automotive Fine Arts Society =

The Automotive Fine Arts Society was founded in 1983 and the founding member was Ken Eberts The society was started by artists who were acknowledged to be the best in their area of expertise. AFAS members today work in many different ways that would include but not be limited to, oil paints, watercolors, acrylics, pen and ink and they participate in a multitude of art exhibitions and shows across the United States from California to Florida to legitimize and promote the car, and associated motoring objects, as worthy subjects for high quality artwork.

For over thirty years, the AFAS has exhibited annually at the world renowned Pebble Beach Concours d’Elegance. Their stand is sponsored by internationally known brands such as the Lincoln Motor Company who have been sponsors for twenty years. Kumar Galhotra, President, Lincoln Motor Company is quoted as saying “AFAS artists represent the pinnacle of taste and quality".

== Members ==
- Jack Juratovic
- Harold Cleworth
- Ken Eberts
