= Charles Pannell, Baron Pannell =

British Labour Party politician

The Right Honourable The Lord Pannell PC

Minister of Public Buildings and Works
- In office 16 October 1964 – 6 April 1966
- Monarch: Elizabeth II
- Prime Minister: Harold Wilson
- Preceded by: Geoffrey Rippon
- Succeeded by: Reg Prentice

Member of Parliament for Leeds West
- In office 21 July 1949 – 8 February 1974
- Preceded by: Thomas Stamford
- Succeeded by: Joseph Dean

Personal details
- Born: 10 September 1902
- Died: 23 March 1980 (aged 77)
- Party: Labour

Thomas Charles Pannell, Baron Pannell, PC (10 September 1902 – 23 March 1980) was a British Labour Party politician.

He entered local politics in the outer London suburbs: he was a member of Walthamstow Borough Council from 1929 to 1936 and of Erith Borough Council from 1938 to 1955, and served as Mayor of Erith in 1945–46. He also sat on Kent County Council, where he was deputy leader of the Labour group from 1946 to 1949.

He was elected member of parliament for Leeds West at a 1949 by-election, and served until his retirement at the February 1974 general election.

Pannell served as Minister of Public Building and Works in the first Wilson government, 1964–66. He once served as a pairing whip for future Conservative leader Margaret Thatcher and was among the first to tip her as a future Prime Minister.

On 21 June 1974 he was created a life peer, taking the title Baron Pannell, of the City of Leeds.

Parliament of the United Kingdom
Preceded by Thomas William Stamford	Member of Parliament for Leeds West; 1949 – 1974	Succeeded by Joseph Dean
Political offices
Preceded by Geoffrey Rippon	Minister of Public Buildings and Works; 1964–1966	Succeeded by Reg Prentice
