= Ralph Cleworth =

Ralph Cleworth QC (31 October 1896 – 22 October 1975), was a British lawyer and Liberal Party politician.

== Background ==
Cleworth was born the son of Rev. William Enoch Cleworth. He was educated at Wheelwright Grammar School for Boys, Dewsbury and Christ's College, Cambridge. In 1928 he married Eleanore Greenwood. They had one son.

== Professional career ==
Cleworth received a Call to the bar in 1924. He worked as a barrister on the North-Eastearn Circuit. He became a Queens Counsel in 1947.

== Political career ==
In 1927 Cleworth was Liberal candidate for Armley & Wortley in the Leeds County Borough elections. He was in a three-party contest with Labour and Conservative. He came third polling 15% of the vote. In 1929 he was Liberal candidate for the Leeds West division of Yorkshire at the UK General Election. Leeds West was a Labour/Unionist marginal that Labour had won in 1923 and 1924. Cleworth's prospects were not good and he finished a distant third as expected. He did not stand for parliament again.

=== Electoral record ===
General Election 1929: Leeds West
Party	Candidate	Votes	%	±%
Labour	Thomas William Stamford	18,765	41.9	
Unionist	George William Martin	18,129	40.8	
Liberal	Ralph Cleworth	7,892	17.6	
Majority		636	1.1	
Turnout		44,786		
Labour hold		Swing		
