= Michael Meadowcroft =

British politician (1942–2026)

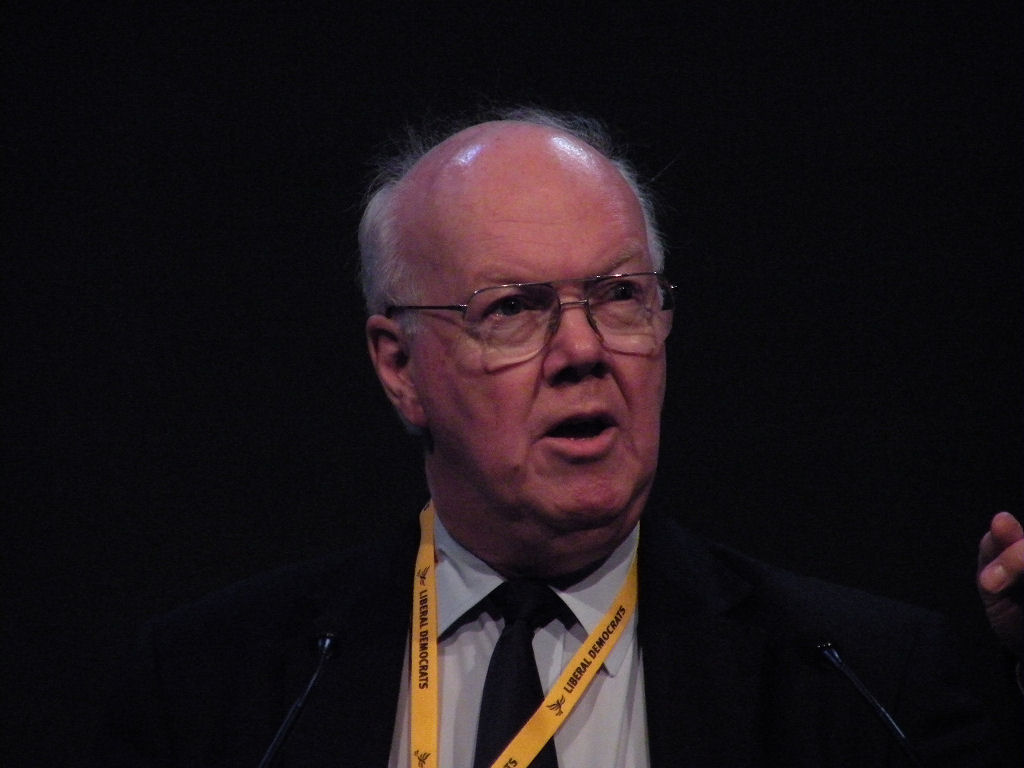

Leader of the Liberal Party
- In office 13 March 1989 – 2002
- Preceded by: Party refounded
- Succeeded by: Mike Oborski

Member of Parliament for Leeds West
- In office 9 June 1983 – 18 May 1987
- Preceded by: Joseph Dean
- Succeeded by: John Battle

Leeds City Councillor for Armley Ward Armley & Castleton (1973–1980)
- In office 1973–1983
- Preceded by: New ward
- Succeeded by: Sandy Melville

Leeds City Councillor for Castleton Ward
- In office 1968–1973
- Preceded by: Ward created
- Succeeded by: Ward abolished

Personal details
- Born: 6 March 1942 Halifax, West Yorkshire, England
- Died: 1 June 2026 (aged 84)
- Party: Liberal (1962–1988); SLD (1988–1989); 'Continuing' Liberal (1989–2007); Liberal Democrats (2007–2026)

Michael James Meadowcroft (6 March 1942 – 1 June 2026) was a British author, politician and political affairs consultant. He served as the Member of Parliament (MP) for Leeds West from 1983 to 1987.

== Early life ==
Meadowcroft was born in Halifax, West Riding, and grew up in Southport, Lancashire. He was educated at King George V Grammar School in Southport. His parents supported the Labour Party. In 1958, he left school to work as a bank clerk, and joined the Liberal Party. He became Chairman of the Merseyside Region of the National League of Young Liberals in 1961.

== Early political career ==
Between 1962 and 1967, Meadowcroft worked for the Liberal Party and became the party's Local Government Officer.

In 1968, he was elected as a Liberal member of Leeds City Council and served until 1983. Meadowcroft also led the Liberal Group on the council for a large part of his time as a city councillor. He also served as a member of West Yorkshire Metropolitan County Council from 1973 to 1976 and again from 1981 to 1983.

He held many roles within the party, including the chair of the Liberal Party Assembly committee responsible for organising the party's conferences. He also authored a number of influential pamphlets championing liberal philosophy and the principles of community politics.

== Member of Parliament ==
Meadowcroft stood unsuccessfully in Leeds West for the Liberals in the general elections of February 1974 and October 1974 before winning in 1983, when he defeated Labour MP Joseph Dean. This victory was a shock result and has been attributed to an early form of community politics, focusing on local problems.

Before being elected, he had already been known as an opponent of the SDP–Liberal Alliance given differing policies between the two parties. By the time of his election, the term "Meadowcroft Tendency" (a play on Labour's Militant Tendency) was being used for those in the Liberal Party who favoured alliances with the Campaign for Nuclear Disarmament and civil rights groups above the SDP. He wrote in an opinion piece in October 1986 that "my seniors in the party suspect that some of my opinions are quite unorthodox: indeed, are positively heretical".

In a reshuffle of July 1985, Meadowcroft was appointed the head of the Liberals' by-election unit. In 1986, he was the Liberal Party's spokesman on community relations and opposed the introduction of visas for Commonwealth migrants.

Meadowcroft was amongst those in the Liberal Party who criticised leader David Steel's compromises with the SDP over defence policy and favoured nuclear disarmament. He favoured a European defence policy, independent of both the United States and the Soviet Union, and without nuclear weapons. After publishing a paper on defence, together with Archy Kirkwood and Simon Hughes, named Across the divide, shortly before the Liberal Assembly voted for an amendment to Steel's defence strategy that required a non-nuclear system, he was jeered by other Liberal MPs and Peers at the 1986 Assembly, and accused of violating collective responsibility for the Liberal front bench. Meadowcroft said that they had been assured that the Alliance's joint report on defence would not be published around the same time as their paper and that this promise had not been kept.

He later served as party spokesman on local government and on housing, in particular highlighting the problems of rising housing costs in the south-east of England.

Meadowcroft was defeated in the 1987 general election by Labour candidate John Battle. Some suggested that his approach had been less suited to parliamentary than to municipal politics.

== Post-Parliamentary career ==
Meadowcroft was a trustee of the Community Development Trust from 1986 to 1996 and chaired the Electoral Reform Society from 1989 to 1993. He was a member of the society's governing council.

He was on the team to discuss the Liberal Party's merger with the Social Democratic Party in 1988. He was the first of several Liberals to walk out of the negotiations, citing the commitment to NATO in the constitutional preamble for the merged party. He argued for a "No" vote to the merger at the special Liberal Assembly in Blackpool, but the vote went in favour of merger by 2099 votes to 385, with 23 abstentions. He briefly stayed with the Social and Liberal Democrats (the name was later shortened to the 'Liberal Democrats') to support Alan Beith's candidacy for leader. After Beith was defeated by Paddy Ashdown, Meadowcroft became a co-founder and the first leader of the continuing Liberal Party, which attracted some liberals disillusioned with the political and financial problems of the Social and Liberal Democrats.

Returning to local politics, he unsuccessfully stood to be elected once again to Leeds City Council, contesting the Bramley ward in the 1990 and 1991 elections.

Meadowcroft stood against John Battle again in Leeds West in 1992 as the Liberal Party candidate. He finished in fourth place of six candidates, with 3,980 votes (8.3%), behind Battle, Paul Bartlett of the Conservative Party and Liberal Democrat candidate Viscount Morpeth.

On 5 October 2007, it was announced that Meadowcroft had joined the Liberal Democrats, citing the party's opposition to the Iraq War, its rejection of the identity cards policy and their commitment to a united Europe. He defended the Conservative–Liberal Democrat coalition agreement in 2010, saying that Labour had refused to negotiate with them, and that the deal with the Conservatives won concessions on electoral reform and civil liberties.

Meadowcroft was one of the few senior Liberal Democrats to defend Bradford East MP David Ward, who was expelled from the party in 2017 over comments critical of Israel and Zionism.

== IICSA investigation into Cyril Smith ==
As Chair of the Liberal Party's Assembly between 1977 and 1981, Meadowcroft was questioned by the Independent Inquiry into Child Sexual Abuse, in relation to the Liberal MP Cyril Smith, who was arrested several times for sexual abuse but never charged. In his response to a request from the Inquiry under Rule 9 of the Inquiry Rules 2006, Meadowcroft asserted that he had no personal knowledge of the Lancashire Constabulary investigation into Cyril Smith or what the Liberal Party may have known about it. Taking into account the comments by Meadowcroft and other senior Liberals from the period, the Inquiry concluded, "The idea that the Liberal Party in Westminster knew nothing about the allegations concerning Cyril Smith at or after the time he was selected as PPC for Rochdale is highly unlikely."

Meadowcroft was also interviewed as part of the programme The Paedophile MP: How Cyril Smith Got Away With It, in Channel 4's Dispatches series (12 September 2013), in which he said that he had heard that Cyril Smith liked boys but considered these "symptomatic of the unpleasant gossip that permeated Westminster".

In 2015, Meadowcroft was interviewed by Greater Manchester Police on his knowledge of Cyril Smith. He disclosed that, after the Dispatches programme of September 2013, he was e-mailed by a Jill Pratt about how she had reported allegations against Cyril Smith to the Liberal Party's leadership in 1970.

== Political philosophy and views ==
A biography by Mark Smulian described Meadowcroft as "the main, indeed very nearly the only, philosopher of applied Liberalism within the old Liberal Party from the late 1960s onwards". He published a large number of books and pamphlets on his views. He regularly argued for the importance of political philosophy and that the members of the Liberal Democrats require more conviction in their beliefs.

In a 1984 interview with the newspaper Leeds Student, Meadowcroft described himself as "an anarchist at heart, but constitutionalist by conviction". His views on foreign policy at the time were described as "exceedingly radical" for a Liberal, as he opposed the deployment of troops to Northern Ireland, the Falklands War and membership of NATO. In an earlier (1979) interview with a Christian magazine, Meadowcroft advocated a United Ireland. Meadowcroft was a member of the world citizenship movement and supported a democratically constituted world government. He supported open borders in principle, but wrote of border controls in 2001, "their removal overnight in a single operation would provoke immigration to Britain at an artificially high level".

Whilst a member of the post-1988 Liberal Party, he authored two editions of Focus on Freedom: the case for the Liberal Party, which explained the philosophy behind the party's manifesto. Political positions outlined in the book include support for the following:

- The Single Transferable Vote electoral system but opposition to the party list system.
- The UK's withdrawal from NATO and the establishment in turn of a European Security Force to contribute to missions of the United Nations. Meadowcroft stated that Liberals opposed both the Gulf War and the Kosovo War.
- Support for an independent State of Palestine and an independent Kurdistan.
- Membership of the European Union, including membership of Schengen, but with reform of the democratic deficit.
- Opposition to CCTV.
- Preventive healthcare.
- Legalisation of all drugs.
- A ban on private education.
- Nationalisation of the water industry.
- Opposition to identity cards, including a refusal to carry any cards that might be introduced.

== Death ==
Meadowcroft died after a short illness on 1 June 2026, aged 84.

== Works ==
- Meadowcroft, Michael (1972). Success in local government. London: Liberal Publication Department for the Unservile State Group.
- Meadowcroft, Michael (1976). The bluffer's guide to politics : research and reference for councillors and community activists. Manchester: North West Community Newspapers Ltd..
- Meadowcroft, Michael (1979). Liberal values for a new decade. Liberal Publication Department.
- Meadowcroft, Michael; Marquand, David (1981). Liberalism and social democracy. London: Liberal Publication Department.
- Bee, Elizabeth; Meadowcroft, Michael (1998). Faugères : a guide to the appellation (1 ed.). Leeds: Beecroft Publications.
- Meadowcroft, Michael (1997). Focus on freedom: the case for the Liberal Party (1 ed.). Southport: Liberal Party.
- Meadowcroft, Michael (2001). Focus on freedom: the case for the Liberal Party (PDF) (2 ed.). Southport: Liberal Party. ISBN 978-1-898415-09-1.
- Meadowcroft, Michael (2001). New democracies : underpinned or undermined. John Stuart Mill Institute.
- Bee, Elizabeth; Meadowcroft, Michael (2005). Faugères : a guide to the appellation (2 ed.). Leeds: Beecroft Publications.
- Meadowcroft, Michael (2009). Diversity in danger : pluralism and policy development. Leeds: Beecroft Publications.
- Meadowcroft, Michael (2010). The politics of electoral reform (1 ed.). Leeds: Beecroft Publications.
- Meadowcroft, Michael (2016). The politics of electoral reform (2 ed.). Leeds: Beecroft Publications.
- Bee, Elizabeth; MacFadyen, Ian; Meadowcroft, Michael, eds. (2015). The Leeds Yellow Book 2015 : essays on a Liberal future for Leeds. Leeds: Beecroft Publications.
- Bee, Elizabeth; MacFadyen, Ian; Meadowcroft, Michael, eds. (2018). The Leeds Yellow Book 2018 : essays on a Liberal future for Leeds. Leeds: Beecroft Publications.
- Bee, Elizabeth; MacFadyen, Ian; Meadowcroft, Michael; Hussain, Kamran, eds. (2019). The Yorkshire Yellow Book 2019 : essays on a Liberal future for Yorkshire and the Humber. Leeds: Beecroft Publications.

Parliament of the United Kingdom
Preceded by Joseph Dean	Member of Parliament for Leeds West; 1983–1987	Succeeded by John Battle
Party political offices
Preceded by New position	President of the Liberal Party (1989); 1989–2005	Succeeded by Mike Oborski
