= Harold Cleworth =

English automotive artist

Harold James Cleworth is an English automotive artist.

== Personal life ==
Cleworth was born in Leigh, Lancashire, in the late 1930s, the son of a bus driver he was born into a family of two brothers and two sisters. He studied at Manchester College of Art graduating in 1967 with a degree in graphic art. He first worked in London where he illustrated album covers for Decca Records. In 1972, Cleworth moved to San Francisco, and began his automobile painting career in earnest. AutoWeek dubbed him "the painter laureate of the car".

== Work ==
His work was exhibited at the Petersen Automotive Museum in Los Angeles in 2006. He is a member of the Automotive Fine Arts Society.
