= John Hills (politician) =

British politician (1867–1938)

The Right Honourable Major John Hills PC
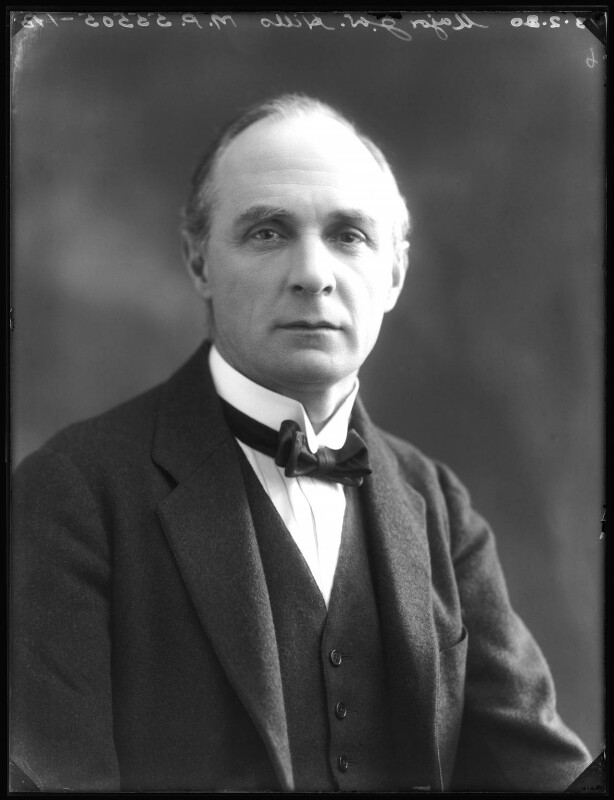

Personal details
- Born: John Waller Hills; 1867
- Died: 24 December 1938 (aged 70–71)
- Party: Liberal Unionist Party (Former)

Military service
- Allegiance: United Kingdom

Major John Waller Hills PC (1867 – 24 December 1938) was a British Liberal Unionist and Conservative politician and author.

The second son of Herbert Augustus and Anna Hills of High Head Castle, Cumberland, Hills was educated at Eton and Balliol College, Oxford. In 1897 he married Stella Duckworth, step-daughter of Leslie Stephen. Three months into the marriage, Stella was taken ill with peritonitis, and died. Nevertheless, Hills retained a close connection with his wife's family after her death, including her half-sisters Virginia Woolf and Vanessa Bell. Woolf professed to dislike him, comparing his appearance to that of "an excellent highly polished well seasoned brown boot."

During World War I he served as a captain in the 4th Battalion of the Durham Light Infantry. He was promoted to the rank of Major in October 1915 and Acting Lieutenant-Colonel of the 20th Battalion in July 1916. He was wounded in September 1916, and mentioned in dispatches.

He was Liberal Unionist Member of Parliament (MP) for City of Durham from 1906 to 1918 and for the successor Durham City Division from 1918 to 1922, and Conservative member for Ripon from December 1925, following his victory in the by-election. He held ministerial office as Financial Secretary to the Treasury from 1922 to 1923.

In 1923, he was appointed by the government to the board of what would become Imperial Airways.

He was appointed a Privy Counsellor in 1929. He was due to be conferred a baronetcy in the 1939 New Year Honours but died before he could receive it. His five-year-old son Andrew Ashton Waller Hills was created a baronet, of Hills Court in the County of Kent, in his stead, whilst his wife was granted the style, title and place of the widow of a baronet. She was also active in politics, but for the Liberal party, standing for parliament at Hendon North in 1959. Hills's son Sir Andrew Hills, 1st Baronet, died in February 1955, aged 21, when the title became extinct.

Hills was also a notable fly fishing historian and author, with published works including:

- A History of Fly Fishing for Trout, 1921
- A Summer on the Test, 1930
- The Dorado, 1932
- River Keeper: The Life of William James Lunn, 1934
- My Sporting Life, 1936

== Sources ==
- Who Was Who

Parliament of the United Kingdom
Preceded by Arthur Elliot	Member of Parliament for City of Durham; 1906–1922	Succeeded by Joshua Ritson
Preceded by Edward Wood	Member of Parliament for Ripon; 1925–1938	Succeeded by Christopher York
Political offices
Preceded by Hilton Young	Financial Secretary to the Treasury; 1922–1923	Succeeded by Archibald Boyd-Carpenter
