= Leeds West =

Parliamentary constituency in the United Kingdom (1885–2024)

- Former borough constituency for the House of Commons
- 2010–2024 boundary of Leeds West in West Yorkshire

- Location of West Yorkshire within England
- County: West Yorkshire (West Riding of Yorkshire until 1974)
- Electorate: 67,727 (December 2019)

1885–2024
- Seats: One
- Created from: Leeds
- Replaced by: Leeds South West and Morley, & Leeds West and Pudsey

Leeds West was a borough constituency covering the western part of the city of Leeds, West Yorkshire which was represented in the House of Commons of the Parliament of the United Kingdom. It elected one Member of Parliament (MP) by the first-past-the-post system of election. With the exception of the Parliament of 1983–87, the seat was held by Labour from 1945 until its abolition.

The seat was abolished for the 2024 general election and replaced primarily by Leeds West and Pudsey.

== Boundaries ==
Map of boundaries 2010–2024

1885–1918: The Municipal Borough of Leeds wards of Armley and Wortley, Holbeck, and New Wortley, and part of Bramley ward.

1918–1950: The County Borough of Leeds wards of Armley and Wortley, and Bramley, and part of New Wortley ward.

1950–1951: The County Borough of Leeds wards of Bramley, Farnley and Wortley, and Upper Armley.

1951–1955: The County Borough of Leeds wards of Armley, Bramley, Stanningley, and Wortley.

1955–1974: The County Borough of Leeds wards of Armley, Bramley, Stanningley, Wellington, and Wortley.

1974–1983: The County Borough wards of Armley and Castleton, Bramley, Stanningley, and Wortley.

1980–1983: The City of Leeds wards of Armley, Bramley, and Wortley.

1983–2010: The City of Leeds wards of Armley, Bramley, Kirkstall, and Wortley.

2010–2024: The City of Leeds wards of Armley, Bramley and Stanningley, Farnley and Wortley, and Kirkstall. Unusually for a Parliamentary seat, the boundaries did not correspond exactly to the wards' boundaries. The seat included small areas of the wards for Calverley and Farsley, and Morley North, but also excluded a very small area of Farnley and Wortley, which fell under Leeds Central.

== History ==
The constituency was created in 1885 by the Redistribution of Seats Act 1885, and was first used in the general election of that year. Leeds had previously been represented by two MPs (1832–1868) and three MPs (1868–1885). From 1885 it was represented by five single-member constituencies: Leeds Central, Leeds East, Leeds North, Leeds South and Leeds West. The constituencies of Morley, Otley and Pudsey were also created in 1885.

=== Abolition ===
Further to the completion of the 2023 Periodic Review of Westminster constituencies, the seat was abolished for the 2024 general election, with its contents distributed to three new constituencies:

- Armley, Bramley and Stanningley to Leeds West and Pudsey
- Farnley and Wortley to Leeds South West and Morley
- Kirkstall to Leeds Central and Headingley

== Members of Parliament ==
Leeds prior to 1885

Year	Member	Party
1885	Herbert Gladstone	Liberal
1910	Edmund Harvey	Liberal
1918	John Murray	Coalition Liberal
1922	John Murray	Liberal
1923	Thomas Stamford	Labour
1931	Vyvyan Adams	Conservative
1945	Thomas Stamford	Labour
1949	Charles Pannell	Labour
1974	Joe Dean	Labour
1983	Michael Meadowcroft	Liberal
1987	John Battle	Labour
2010	Rachel Reeves	Labour
2024	Constituency abolished	

== Election results 1885–2024 ==
=== Elections in the 1880s ===
H. Gladstone

General election 1885: Leeds West
Party	Candidate	Votes	%	±%
Liberal	Herbert Gladstone	6,130	61.7	
Conservative	William Wheelhouse	3,804	38.3	
Majority		2,326	23.4	
Turnout		9,934	82.4	
Registered electors		12,058		
Liberal win (new seat)				

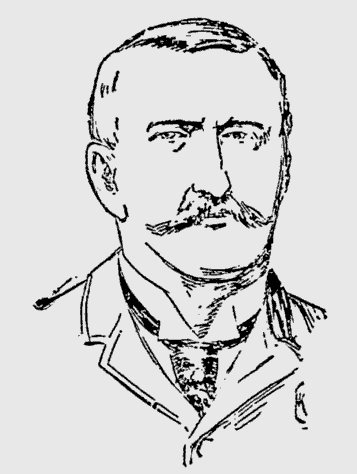
Charles Williams

General election 1886: Leeds West
Party	Candidate	Votes	%	±%
Liberal	Herbert Gladstone	5,226	63.8	+2.1
Conservative	Charles Williams	2,970	36.2	−2.1
Majority		2,256	27.6	+4.2
Turnout		8,196	68.0	−14.4
Registered electors		12,058		
Liberal hold		Swing	+1.6	

=== Elections in the 1890s ===
General election 1892: Leeds West
Party	Candidate	Votes	%	±%
Liberal	Herbert Gladstone	5,974	51.5	−12.3
Conservative	Arthur Greenwood	5,621	48.5	+12.3
Majority		353	3.0	−24.6
Turnout		11,595	85.8	+17.8
Registered electors		13,510		
Liberal hold		Swing	-12.3	

By-election 16 Mar 1894: Leeds West
Party	Candidate	Votes	%	±%
Liberal	Herbert Gladstone	Unopposed		
Liberal hold				

Gladstone is appointed First Commissioner of Works, requiring a by-election.

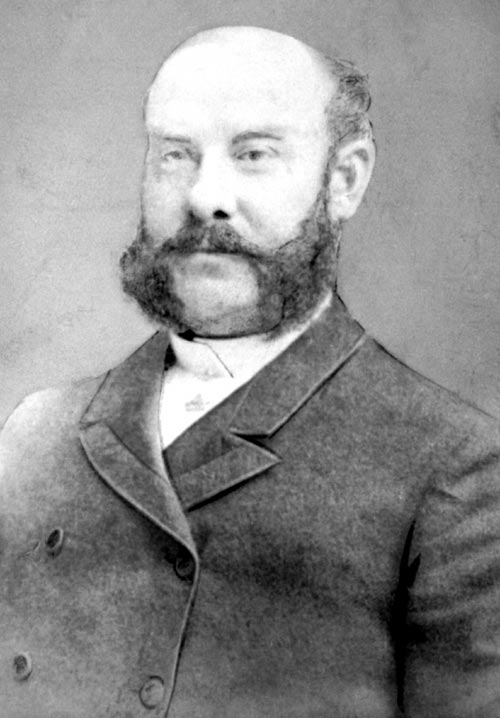
J.T. North

General election 1895: Leeds West
Party	Candidate	Votes	%	±%
Liberal	Herbert Gladstone	6,314	50.4	−1.1
Conservative	John Thomas North	6,218	49.6	+1.1
Majority		96	0.8	−2.2
Turnout		12,532	87.3	+1.5
Registered electors		14,358		
Liberal hold		Swing	-1.1	

=== Elections in the 1900s ===
General election 1900: Leeds West
Party	Candidate	Votes	%	±%
Liberal	Herbert Gladstone	7,043	51.9	+1.5
Liberal Unionist	Walter Harding	6,522	48.1	−1.5
Majority		521	3.8	+3.0
Turnout		13,565	80.4	−6.9
Registered electors		16,867		
Liberal hold		Swing	+1.5	

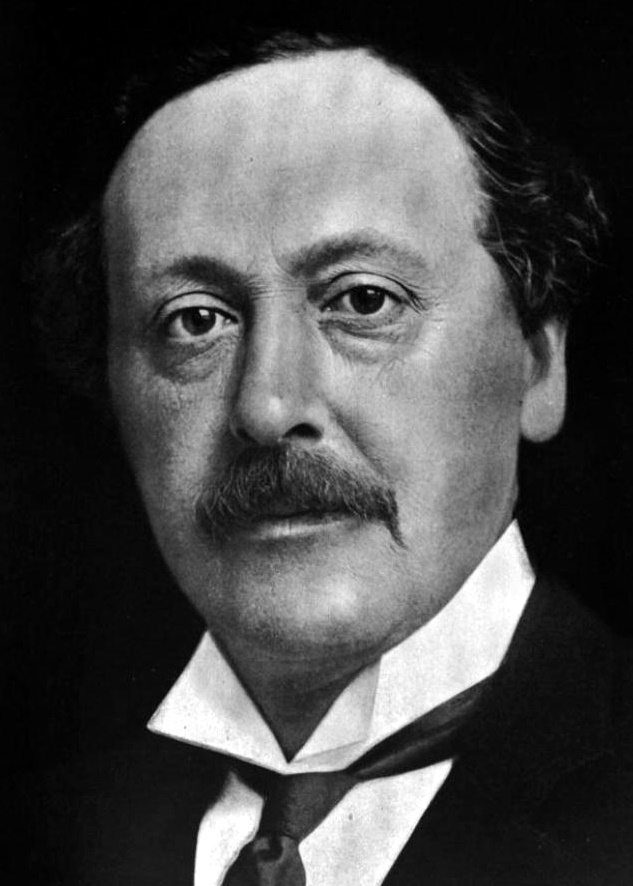
H. Gladstone

General election 1906: Leeds West
Party	Candidate	Votes	%	±%
Liberal	Herbert Gladstone	9,258	66.6	+14.7
Conservative	Samuel Samuel	4,650	33.4	−14.7
Majority		4,608	33.2	+29.4
Turnout		13,908	75.1	−5.3
Registered electors		18,518		
Liberal hold		Swing	+14.7	

=== Elections in the 1910s ===
Edmund Harvey

General election January 1910: Leeds West
Party	Candidate	Votes	%	±%
Liberal	Edmund Harvey	9,969	60.0	−6.6
Conservative	Samuel Samuel	6,654	40.0	+6.6
Majority		3,315	20.0	−13.2
Turnout		16,623	88.1	+13.0
Liberal hold		Swing	-6.6	

General election December 1910: Leeds West
Party	Candidate	Votes	%	±%
Liberal	Edmund Harvey	8,715	66.2	+6.2
Conservative	George Jones	4,445	33.8	−6.2
Majority		4,270	32.4	+12.4
Turnout		13,160	69.7	−18.4
Liberal hold		Swing	+6.2	

General Election 1914–15:

Another General Election was required to take place before the end of 1915. The political parties had been making preparations for an election to take place and by July 1914, the following candidates had been selected;

- Liberal: Edmund Harvey
- Unionist:

General election 1918: Leeds West
Party		Candidate	Votes	%	±%
C	Liberal	John Murray	12,642	61.9	−4.3
	Labour	John Arnott	6,020	29.5	New
	Independent	Joseph Henry Chapman*	1,138	5.6	New
	Independent Liberal	David Thomas Barnes	619	3.0	New
Majority			6,622	32.4	0.0
Turnout			20,419	52.7	−17.0
Registered electors			38,766		
	Liberal hold		Swing	N/A	
C indicates candidate endorsed by the coalition government.

* Chapman was supported by the three local branches of National Association of Discharged Sailors and Soldiers, National Federation of Discharged and Demobilized Sailors and Soldiers and Comrades of the Great War.

=== Elections in the 1920s ===
General election 1922: Leeds West
Party	Candidate	Votes	%	±%
Liberal	John Murray	13,391	51.7	−10.2
Labour	Thomas Stamford	12,487	48.3	+18.8
Majority		904	3.4	−29.0
Turnout		25,878	67.6	+14.9
Registered electors		38,259		
Liberal hold		Swing	−14.5	

General election 1923: Leeds West
Party	Candidate	Votes	%	±%
Labour	Thomas Stamford	11,434	40.7	−7.6
Unionist	Alexander Frederick Gordon Renton	9,432	33.6	New
Liberal	John Murray	7,200	25.7	−26.0
Majority		2,002	7.1	N/A
Turnout		28,066	71.6	+4.0
Registered electors		39,175		
Labour gain from Liberal		Swing	+9.2	

General election 1924: Leeds West
Party	Candidate	Votes	%	±%
Labour	Thomas Stamford	13,057	42.5	+1.8
Unionist	Alexander Frederick Gordon Renton	13,054	42.5	+8.9
Liberal	Herbert Brown	4,597	15.0	−10.7
Majority		3	0.0	−7.1
Turnout		30,708	77.5	+5.9
Registered electors		39,644		
Labour hold		Swing	−3.6	

General election 1929: Leeds West
Party	Candidate	Votes	%	±%
Labour	Thomas Stamford	18,765	47.2	+4.7
Unionist	George William Martin	13,129	33.0	−9.5
Liberal	Ralph Cleworth	7,894	19.8	+4.8
Majority		5,636	14.2	+14.2
Turnout		39,788	79.4	+1.9
Registered electors		50,107		
Labour hold		Swing	+7.1	

=== Elections in the 1930s ===
General election 1931: Leeds West
Party	Candidate	Votes	%	±%
Conservative	Vyvyan Adams	24,701	63.25	
Labour	Thomas Stamford	14,354	36.75	
Majority		10,347	26.50	N/A
Turnout		39,055	76.72	
Conservative gain from Labour		Swing		

General election 1935: Leeds West
Party	Candidate	Votes	%	±%
Conservative	Vyvyan Adams	20,545	54.27	
Labour	Thomas Stamford	17,311	45.73	
Majority		3,234	8.54	
Turnout		37,856	70.46	
Conservative hold		Swing		

=== Elections in the 1940s ===
General election 1945: Leeds West
Party	Candidate	Votes	%	±%
Labour	Thomas Stamford	26,593	59.0	+14.3
Conservative	Vyvyan Adams	12,457	27.7	−26.6
Liberal	James Booth	6,008	13.3	New
Majority		14,136	31.3	N/A
Turnout		45,058	76.1	+5.6
Labour gain from Conservative		Swing		

Leeds West by-election 1949
Party	Candidate	Votes	%	±%
Labour	Charles Pannell	21,935	55.2	−3.8
Conservative	Bernard Mather	17,826	44.8	+17.1
Majority		4,109	10.4	−21.0
Turnout		39,761		
Labour hold		Swing		

=== Elections in the 1950s ===
General election 1950: Leeds West
Party	Candidate	Votes	%	±%
Labour	Charles Pannell	21,339	51.58	
Conservative	Bertrand Mather	16,824	40.67	
Liberal	Cecil Rhodes	3,209	7.76	
Majority		4,515	10.91	
Turnout		41,372	86.42	
Labour hold		Swing		

General election 1951: Leeds West
Party	Candidate	Votes	%	±%
Labour	Charles Pannell	22,357	54.11	
Conservative	Bertrand Mather	18,957	45.89	
Majority		3,400	8.22	
Turnout		41,314	85.92	
Labour hold		Swing		

General election 1955: Leeds West
Party	Candidate	Votes	%	±%
Labour	Charles Pannell	24,576	52.75	
Conservative	Joseph Hiley	18,312	39.31	
Liberal	Harold Hudson	3,699	7.94	New
Majority		6,264	13.44	
Turnout		46,587	77.38	
Labour hold		Swing		

General election 1959: Leeds West
Party	Candidate	Votes	%	±%
Labour	Charles Pannell	25,878	54.87	
Conservative	David Crouch	21,285	45.13	
Majority		4,593	9.74	
Turnout		47,163	78.25	
Labour hold		Swing		

=== Elections in the 1960s ===
General election 1964: Leeds West
Party	Candidate	Votes	%	±%
Labour	Charles Pannell	22,968	50.53	
Conservative	Michael Glover	15,697	34.54	
Liberal	Denis Pedder	6,787	14.93	New
Majority		7,271	15.99	
Turnout		45,452	74.54	
Labour hold		Swing		

General election 1966: Leeds West
Party	Candidate	Votes	%	±%
Labour	Charles Pannell	24,391	56.28	
Conservative	Michael Glover	13,883	32.04	
Liberal	Denis Pedder	5,062	11.68	
Majority		10,508	24.24	
Turnout		43,336	72.02	
Labour hold		Swing		

=== Elections in the 1970s ===
General election 1970: Leeds West
Party	Candidate	Votes	%	±%
Labour	Charles Pannell	21,618	51.83	
Conservative	Alexander Leitch	14,749	35.36	
Liberal	Patricia Armitage	5,341	12.81	
Majority		6,869	16.47	
Turnout		41,708	65.69	
Labour hold		Swing		

General election February 1974: Leeds West
Party	Candidate	Votes	%	±%
Labour	Joseph Dean	19,436	42.13	
Liberal	Michael Meadowcroft	15,451	33.49	
Conservative	D. Hall	11,246	24.38	
Majority		3,985	8.64	
Turnout		46,133	77.03	
Labour hold		Swing		

General election October 1974: Leeds West
Party	Candidate	Votes	%	±%
Labour	Joseph Dean	20,669	49.64	
Liberal	Michael Meadowcroft	13,062	31.37	
Conservative	D. Hall	7,907	18.99	
Majority		7,607	18.27	
Turnout		41,638	68.93	
Labour hold		Swing		

General election 1979: Leeds West
Party	Candidate	Votes	%	±%
Labour	Joseph Dean	21,290	49.38	
Conservative	H. Simmonds	11,626	26.96	
Liberal	C. Greenfield	9,734	22.58	
National Front	J. Duckenfield	466	1.08	New
Majority		9,664	22.42	
Turnout		43,116	73.33	
Labour hold		Swing		

=== Elections in the 1980s ===
General election 1983: Leeds West
Party	Candidate	Votes	%	±%
Liberal	Michael Meadowcroft	17,908	38.4	
Labour	Joseph Dean	15,860	34.0	
Conservative	Jocelyn Keeble	12,515	26.9	
BNP	A. Braithwaite	334	0.7	New
Majority		2,048	4.4	N/A
Turnout		46,617	69.0	
Liberal gain from Labour		Swing		

General election 1987: Leeds West
Party	Candidate	Votes	%	±%
Labour	John Battle	21,032	43.2	+9.2
Liberal	Michael Meadowcroft	16,340	33.6	−4.8
Conservative	Philip Allott	11,276	23.2	−3.7
Majority		4,692	9.6	N/A
Turnout		48,648	73.3	+4.3
Labour gain from Liberal		Swing	+7.0	

=== Elections in the 1990s ===
General election 1992: Leeds West
Party	Candidate	Votes	%	±%
Labour	John Battle	26,310	55.1	+11.9
Conservative	Paul Bartlett	12,482	26.2	+3.0
Liberal Democrats	George Howard	4,252	8.9	−24.7
Liberal	Michael Meadowcroft	3,980	8.3	New
Green	Alison M. Mander	569	1.2	New
National Front	Robert I. Tenney	132	0.3	New
Majority		13,828	29.0	+19.4
Turnout		47,725	71.2	−2.1
Labour hold		Swing	+4.5	

General election 1997: Leeds West
Party	Candidate	Votes	%	±%
Labour	John Battle	26,819	66.7	+11.6
Conservative	John Whelan	7,048	17.5	−8.7
Liberal Democrats	Nigel Amor	3,622	9.0	+0.1
Referendum	Bill Finley	1,210	3.0	0.0
Green	David Blackburn	896	2.2	+1.0
Liberal	Noel Nowosielski	625	1.6	−6.7
Majority		19,771	49.2	+20.2
Turnout		40,220	62.9	−8,2
Labour hold		Swing		

=== Elections in the 2000s ===
General election 2001: Leeds West
Party	Candidate	Votes	%	±%
Labour	John Battle	19,943	62.1	−4.6
Conservative	Kris Hopkins	5,008	15.6	−1.9
Liberal Democrats	Darren Finlay	3,350	10.4	+1.4
Green	David Blackburn	2,573	8.0	+5.8
UKIP	Bill Finley	758	2.4	New
Liberal	Noel Nowosielski	462	1.4	−0.2
Majority		14,935	46.5	−2.7
Turnout		32,094	50.0	−12.7
Labour hold		Swing		

General election 2005: Leeds West
Party	Candidate	Votes	%	±%
Labour	John Battle	18,704	55.5	−6.6
Liberal Democrats	Darren Finlay	5,894	17.5	+7.1
Conservative	Tim Metcalfe	4,807	14.3	−1.3
Green	David Blackburn	2,519	7.5	−0.5
BNP	Julie Day	1,166	3.5	New
UKIP	David Sewards	628	1.9	−0.5
Majority		12,810	38.0	−8.5
Turnout		33,719	53.6	+3.6
Labour hold		Swing		

=== Elections in the 2010s ===
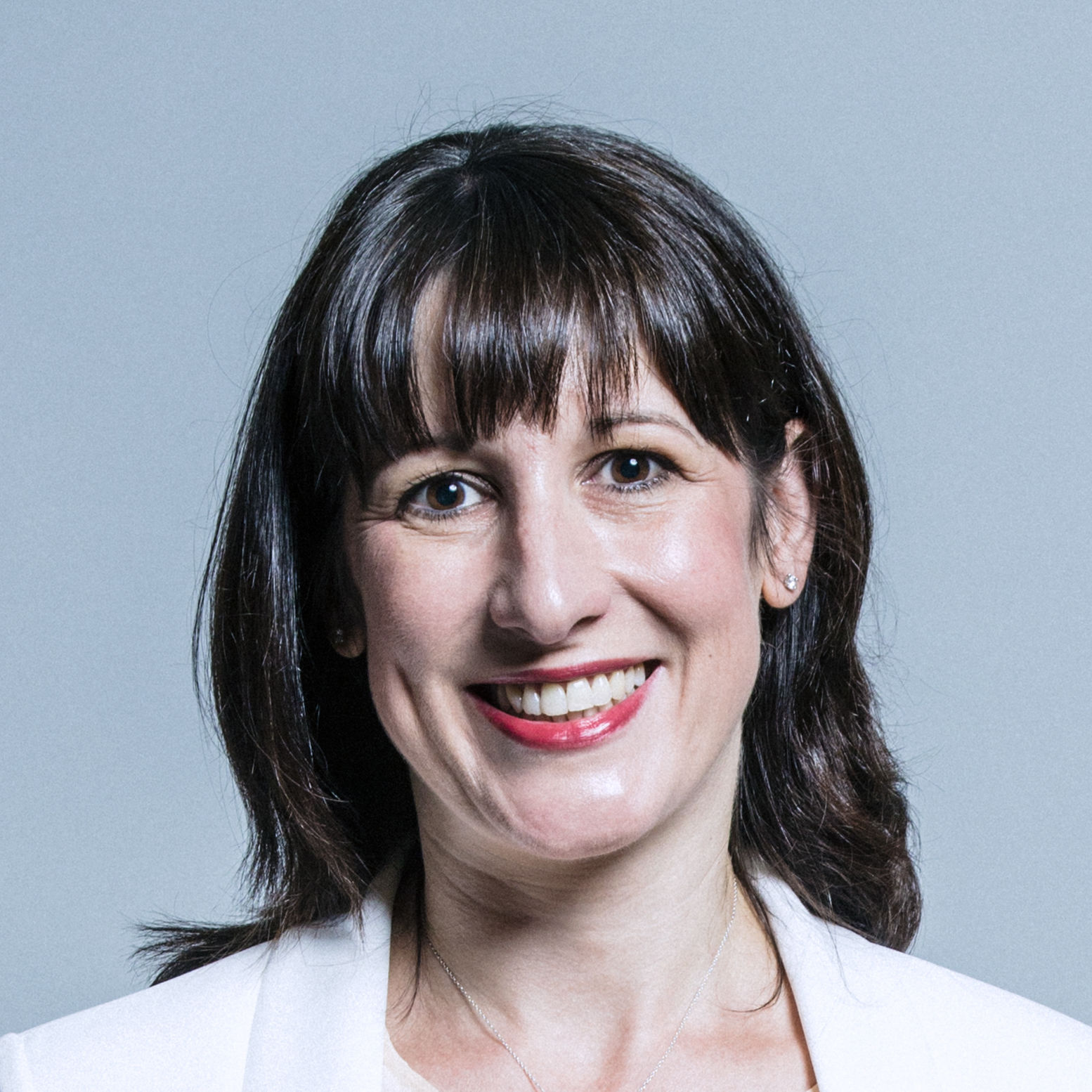
Rachel Reeves, Member of Parliament for Leeds West since 2010

General election 2010: Leeds West
Party	Candidate	Votes	%	±%
Labour	Rachel Reeves	16,389	42.3	−13.9
Liberal Democrats	Ruth Coleman	9,373	24.2	+6.8
Conservative	Joe Marjoram	7,641	19.7	+5.6
BNP	Joanna Beverley	2,377	6.1	+2.8
Green	David Blackburn	1,832	4.7	−2.5
UKIP	Jeff Miles	1,140	2.9	+1.1
Majority		7,016	18.1	−20.7
Turnout		38,752	57.5	+4.7
Labour hold		Swing	−10.3	

General election 2015: Leeds West
Party	Candidate	Votes	%	±%
Labour	Rachel Reeves	18,456	48.0	+5.7
Conservative	Alex Pierre-Traves	7,729	20.1	+0.4
UKIP	Anne Murgatroyd	7,104	18.5	+15.6
Green	Andrew Pointon	3,217	8.4	+3.7
Liberal Democrats	Laura Coyle	1,495	3.9	−20.3
CISTA	Matthew West	217	0.6	New
TUSC	Ben Mayor	205	0.5	New
Majority		10,727	27.9	+9.8
Turnout		38,423	59.2	+1.7
Labour hold		Swing	+2.65	

General election 2017: Leeds West
Party	Candidate	Votes	%	±%
Labour	Rachel Reeves	27,013	63.9	+15.9
Conservative	Zoë Metcalfe	11,048	26.2	+6.1
UKIP	Mark Thackray	1,815	4.3	−14.2
Green	Andrew Pointon	1,023	2.4	−6.0
Liberal Democrats	Alisdair McGregor	905	2.2	−1.7
Yorkshire	Ed Jones	378	0.9	New
Alliance for Green Socialism	Mike Davies	37	0.1	New
Majority		15,965	37.7	+9.8
Turnout		42,301	62.1	+2.9
Labour hold		Swing	+5.0	

General election 2019: Leeds West
Party	Candidate	Votes	%	±%
Labour	Rachel Reeves	22,186	55.1	−8.8
Conservative	Mark Dormer	11,622	28.9	+2.7
Brexit Party	Philip Mars	2,685	6.7	New
Liberal Democrats	Dan Walker	1,787	4.4	+2.2
Green	Victoria Smith	1,274	3.2	+0.8
Yorkshire	Ian Cowling	650	1.6	+0.7
SDP	Daniel Whetstone	46	0.1	New
Alliance for Green Socialism	Mike Davies	31	0.1	0.0
Majority		10,564	26.2	−11.5
Turnout		40,281	59.5	−2.6
Labour hold		Swing	-5.8	

== See also ==
- List of parliamentary constituencies in West Yorkshire
