= Thomas Stamford =

British politician

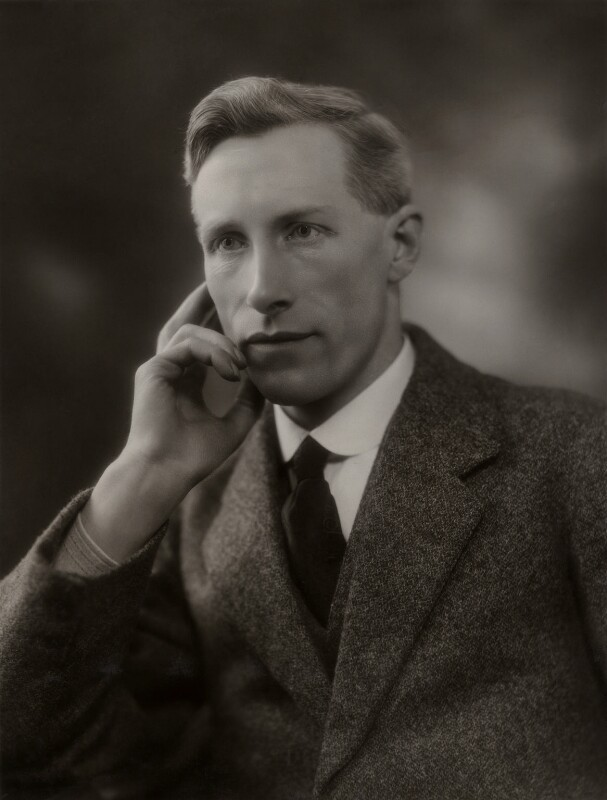
Stamford in 1924

Thomas William Stamford (20 December 1882 – 30 May 1949) was a British politician. He was Labour Member of Parliament (MP) for Leeds West from 1923 to 1931, and from 1945 to his suicide in 1949.

Parliament of the United Kingdom
Preceded by John Murray	Member of Parliament for Leeds West; 1923 – 1931	Succeeded by Vyvyan Adams
Preceded by Vyvyan Adams	Member of Parliament for Leeds West; 1945 – 1949	Succeeded by Charles Pannell
Party political offices
Preceded by Ben Riley	Yorkshire Division representative on the Independent Labour Party National Administrative Council; 1926–1930	Succeeded by Percy Williams
