= Vyvyan Adams =

British Conservative Party politician (1900–51)

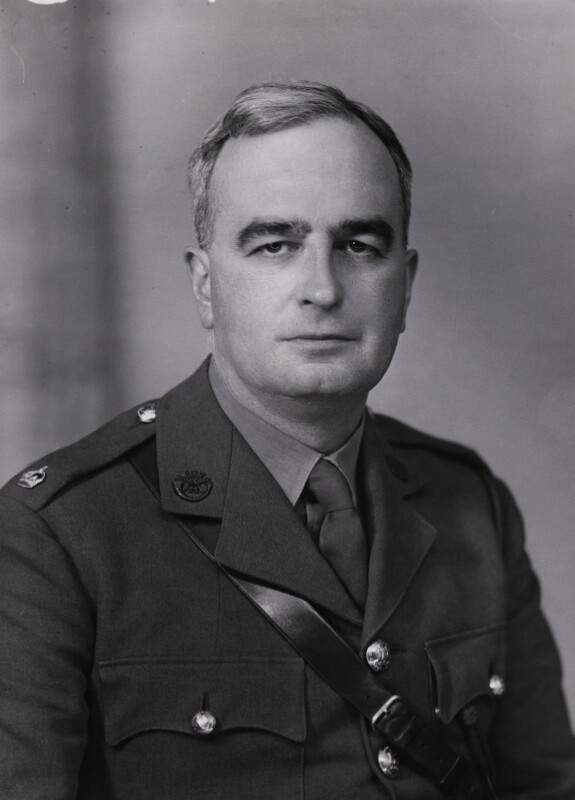
- Adams in 1945

Member of Parliament for Leeds West
- In office 27 October 1931 – 15 June 1945
- Preceded by: Tom Stamford
- Succeeded by: Tom Stamford

Personal details
- Born: 22 April 1900
- Died: 13 August 1951 (aged 51)
- Party: Conservative

Samuel Vyvyan Trerice Adams (22 April 1900 – 13 August 1951), known as Vyvyan Adams, was a British Conservative Party politician. He was the Member of Parliament (MP) for Leeds West from 1931 to 1945, when he was defeated by the swing to Labour. He stood unsuccessfully in the Fulham East constituency in 1950. He had been adopted for the safe Conservative seat of Darwen early in 1951, but died later that year.

His Times obituary was headed Intellectual Honesty and Independence. He was opposed to appeasement of Mussolini (in Abyssinia) and Hitler, and was one of the few Conservative MPs (with Leo Amery, Duff Cooper, Anthony Eden, Harold Nicolson and Winston Churchill) to oppose the Munich agreement with Hitler in 1938. He was opposed to the death penalty.

== Personal life ==
He was educated at King's College School, Cambridge, Haileybury, and King's College, Cambridge (MA). He married Mary Campin in 1925, who would later work as a television producer and program director. He was a barrister and a Major in the Duke of Cornwall's Light Infantry of the British Army in World War II.

In 1951, he drowned while swimming at Gunwalloe Church Cove near Helston, Cornwall, a place noted for strong currents. Their daughter Sally (then 14) helped her mother but was unable to save her father.

== Publications ==
He wrote several books, the first three under the pseudonym Watchman:

- Right Honourable Gentlemen (1939)
- What of the Night? (1940)
- Churchill: Architect of Victory (1940)
- A Letter to a Young Politician (1946)
- The British Co-operative Movement (1948)

== References and sources ==
Sources

- Leigh Rayment’s Historical List of Constituencies
- Who Was Who (1951)
- The Times (London): 1951; Obituary, 15 August p. 6 & news item, 14 August p6.

Parliament of the United Kingdom
| Preceded by Tom Stamford | Member of Parliament for Leeds West; 1931–1945 | Succeeded by Tom Stamford |
